= Tulip poppy =

Tulip poppy is a common name for several plants and may refer to:

- Hunnemannia fumariifolia, native to Mexico
- Papaver glaucum, native to western Asia and widely cultivated as an ornamental
