= P. arenarium =

P. arenarium may refer to:

- Pholisma arenarium, species of flowering plant in the borage family
- Papaver arenarium, species of flowering plant in the family Papaveraceae
