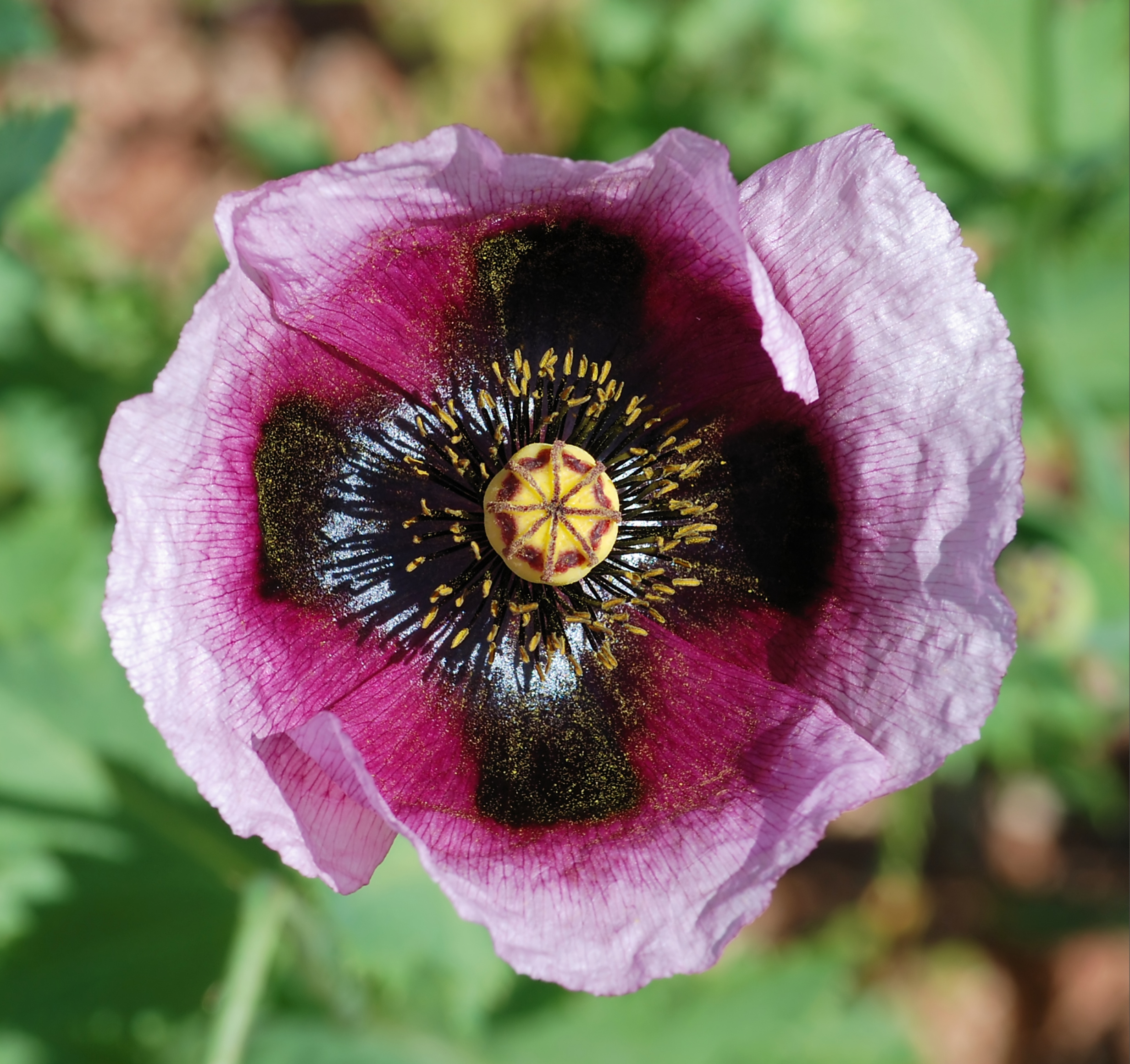
- Close-up on a flower of Papaver setigerum

Scientific classification
- Kingdom: Plantae
- Clade: Embryophytes
- Clade: Tracheophytes
- Clade: Spermatophytes
- Clade: Angiosperms
- Clade: Eudicots
- Order: Ranunculales
- Family: Papaveraceae
- Genus: Papaver
- Species: P. setigerum

Binomial name
- Papaver setigerum DC.

Synonyms
- Papaver somniferum var. setigerum (DC.) Boiss.; Papaver somniferum subsp. setigerum (DC.) L. Corb.

= Papaver setigerum =

Species of flowering plant in the poppy family

Papaver setigerum, common name poppy of Troy or dwarf breadseed poppy, is a herbaceous annual plant of the family Papaveraceae.

This plant is closely related to and sometimes treated as a subspecies of opium poppy (Papaver somniferum). In fact it produces a very small amount of morphine alkaloids. However, P. somniferum is diploid (n=11) and P. setigerum is tetraploid (n=22) with twice the number of chromosomes. So it cannot be considered the wild ancestral species of the opium poppy.

== Etymology ==
The genus name is derived from the Latin word papaverum meaning “poppy”, while the specific name setigerum derives the Latin "saetiger" meaning “bristly” for the short bristle on the top of the lobes of its leaves.

== Description ==
Papaver setigerum reaches on average 20–80 centimetres (7.9–31.5 in) in height. The stem is erect and the leaves are simple, oblong, the lower ones are sessile, deeply lobed and toothed, the higher ones shortly pedunculated.

The flowers at the apex of the stem are hermaphroditic, actinomorphic ("star shaped", "radial"), 4 to 10 cm in diameter. The corolla forms a cup with four pink-purple petals, with a dark purple blotch at the base. It has several stamens with dark filaments holding yellow anthers. Flowering occurs from May through June in the northern hemisphere. The fruits are glabrous capsules 2 to 3 cm long, dehiscent along the holes located under the apical disc. The kidney-shaped seeds are about 1 mm wide.

== Distribution ==
This plant grows wild in the Mediterranean region, especially in southwestern Europe (Portugal, Spain, France, Italy, Greece) and in North Africa. It occurs in south-eastern Australia as a garden escapee.

== Habitat ==
This plant grows in pastures and fields, at an average altitude of 0–600 metres (0–1,969 ft) above sea level.

== Gallery ==
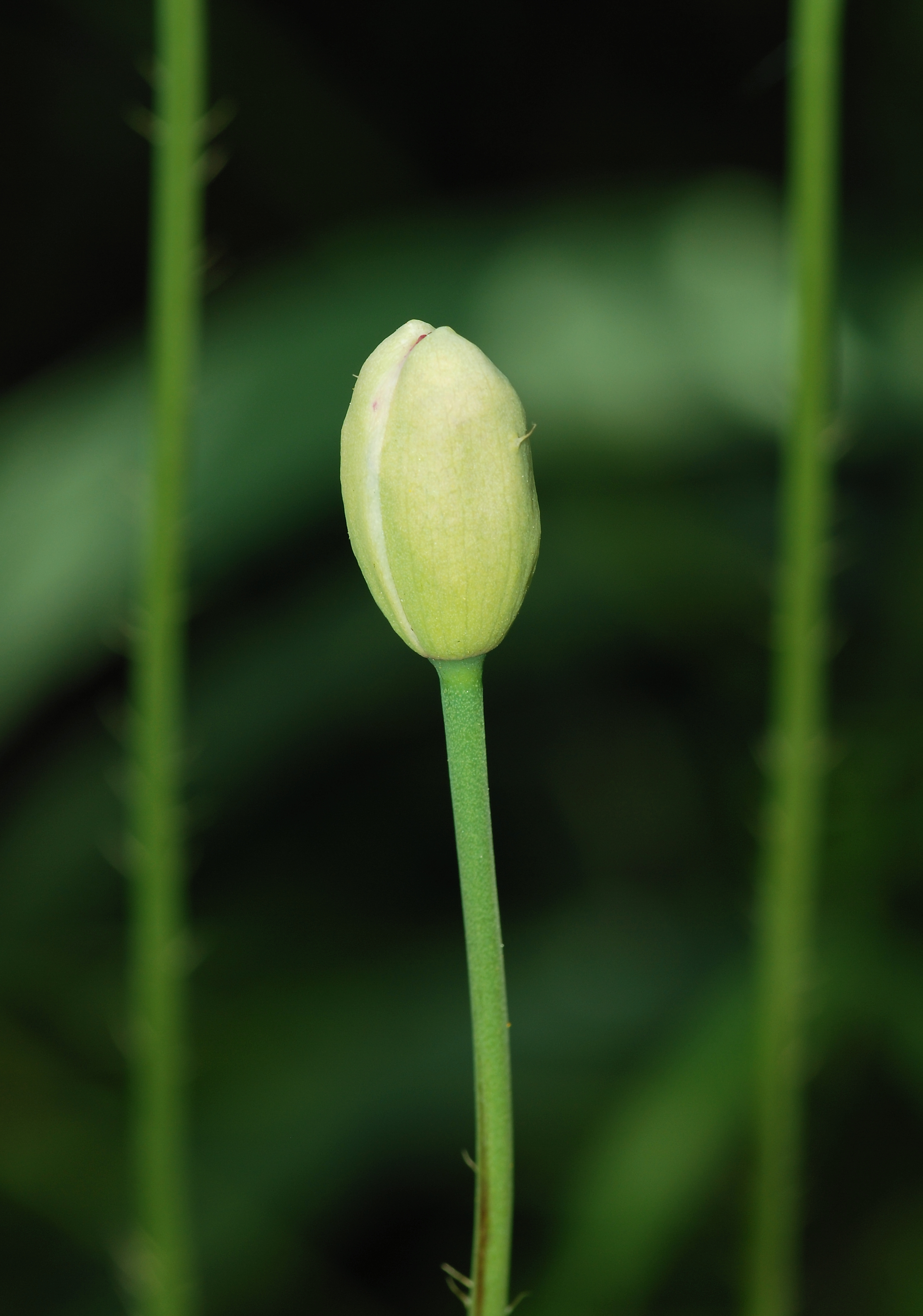
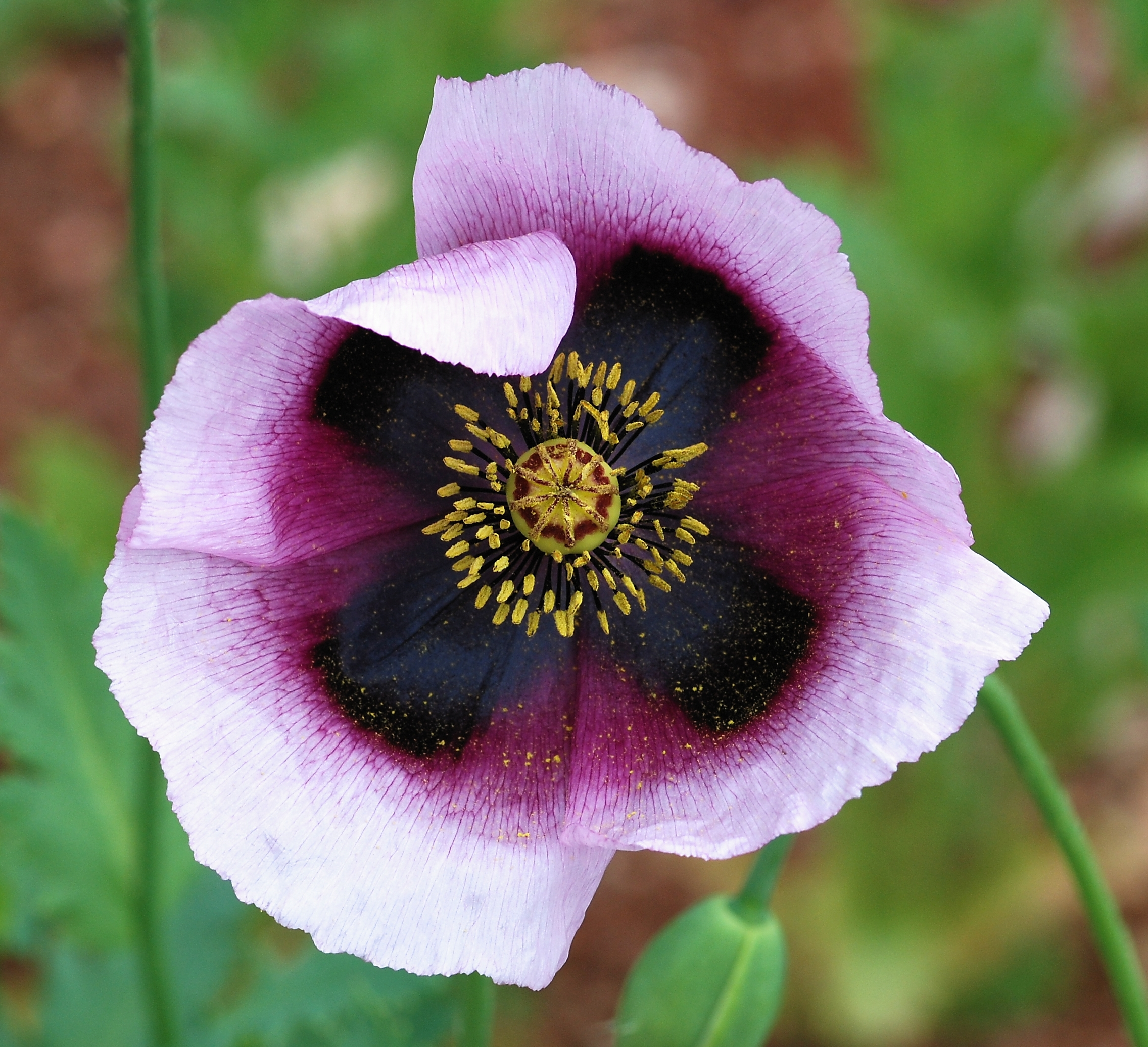
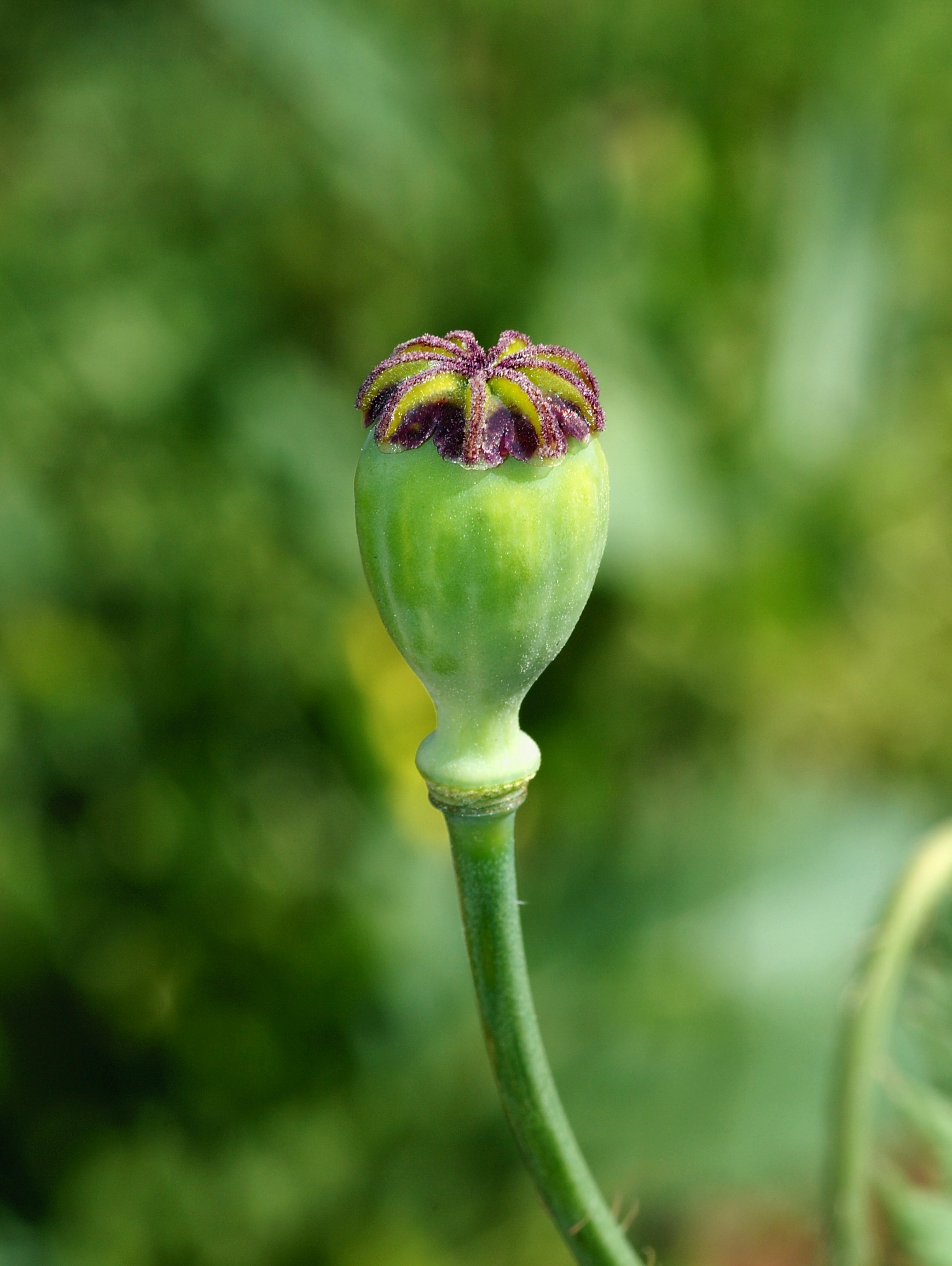
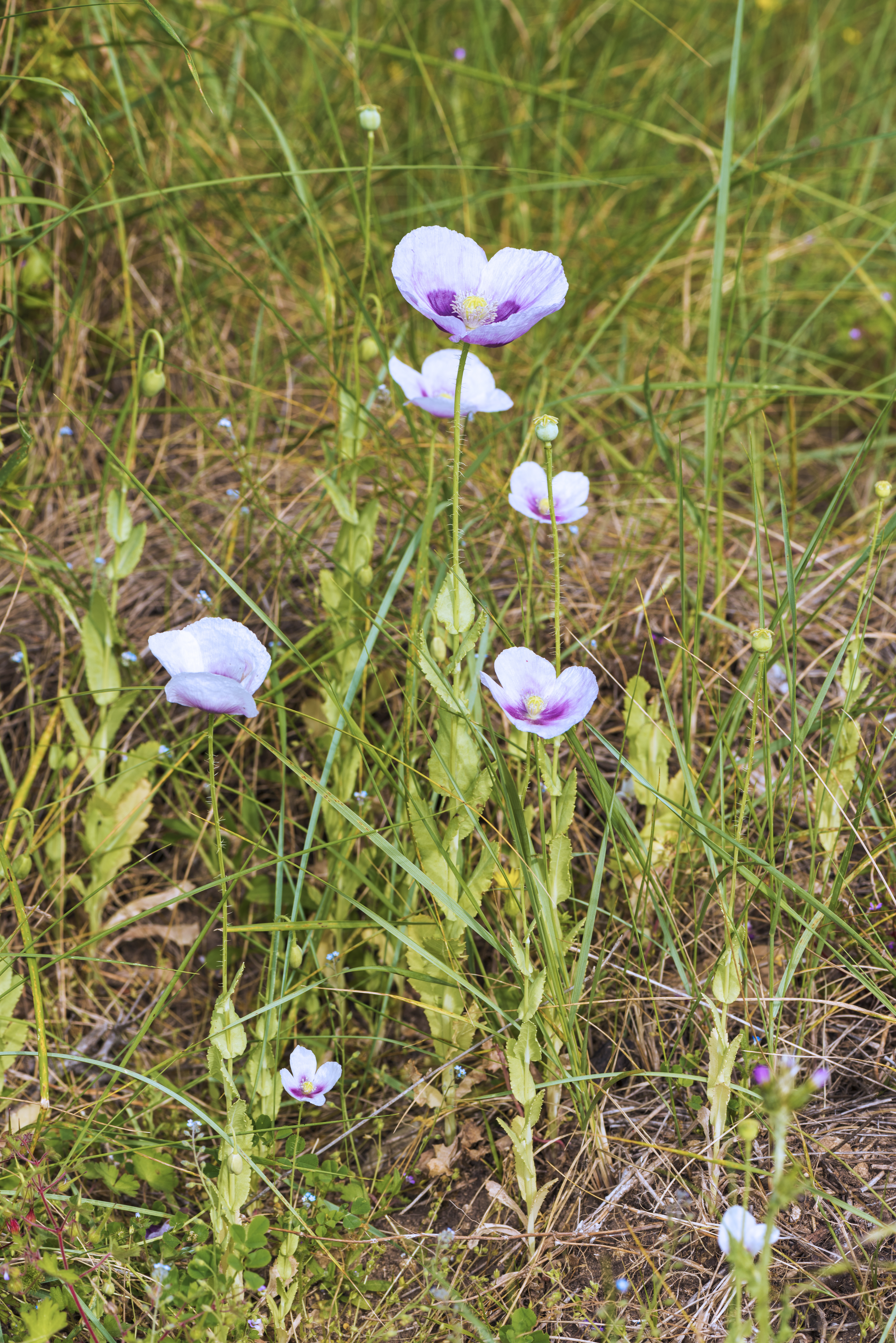
Papaver setigerum, plants with flowers in Aude, France

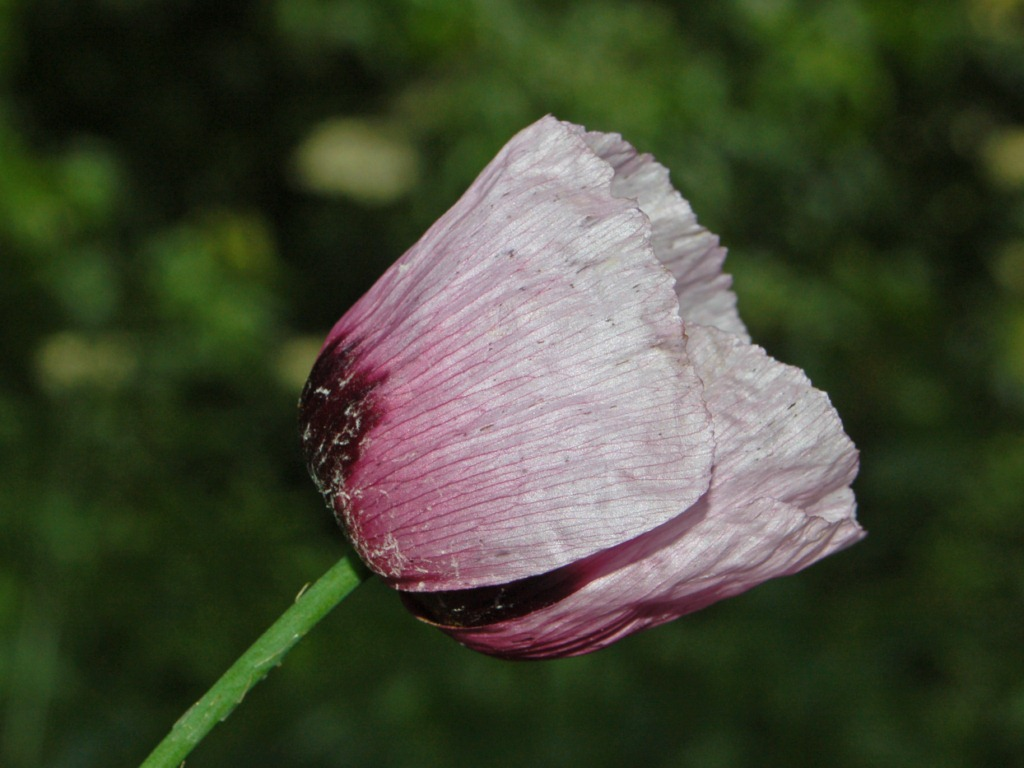
Flower of Papaver setigerum, lateral view

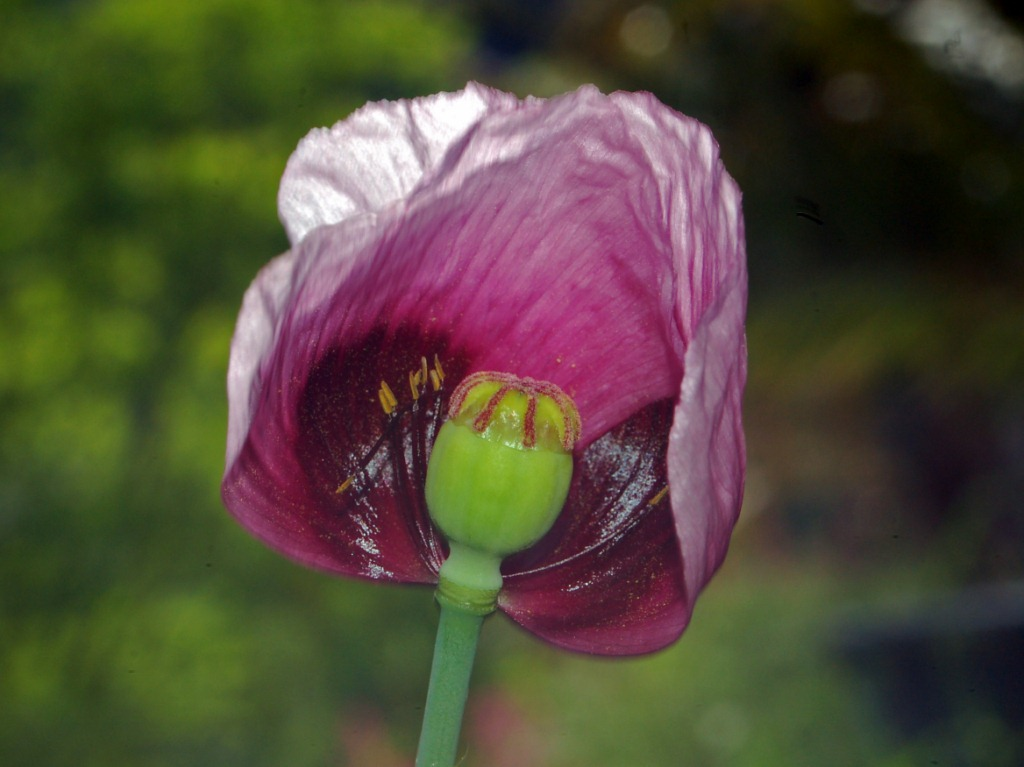
Flower of Papaver setigerum, inside view

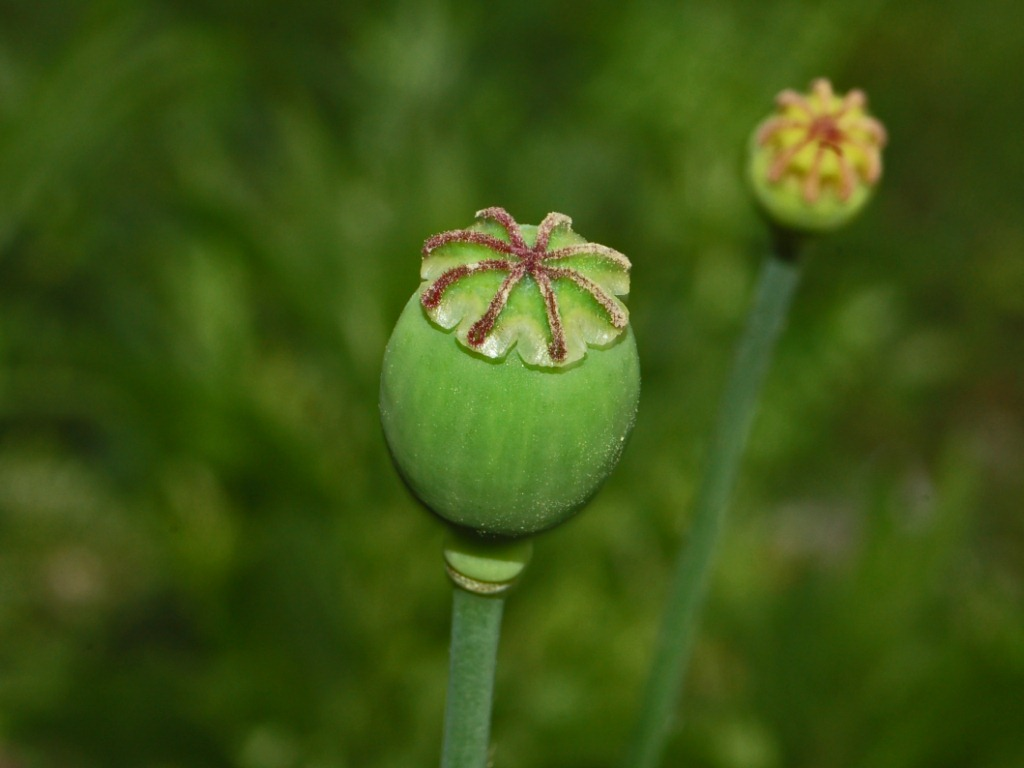
Fruit of Papaver setigerum

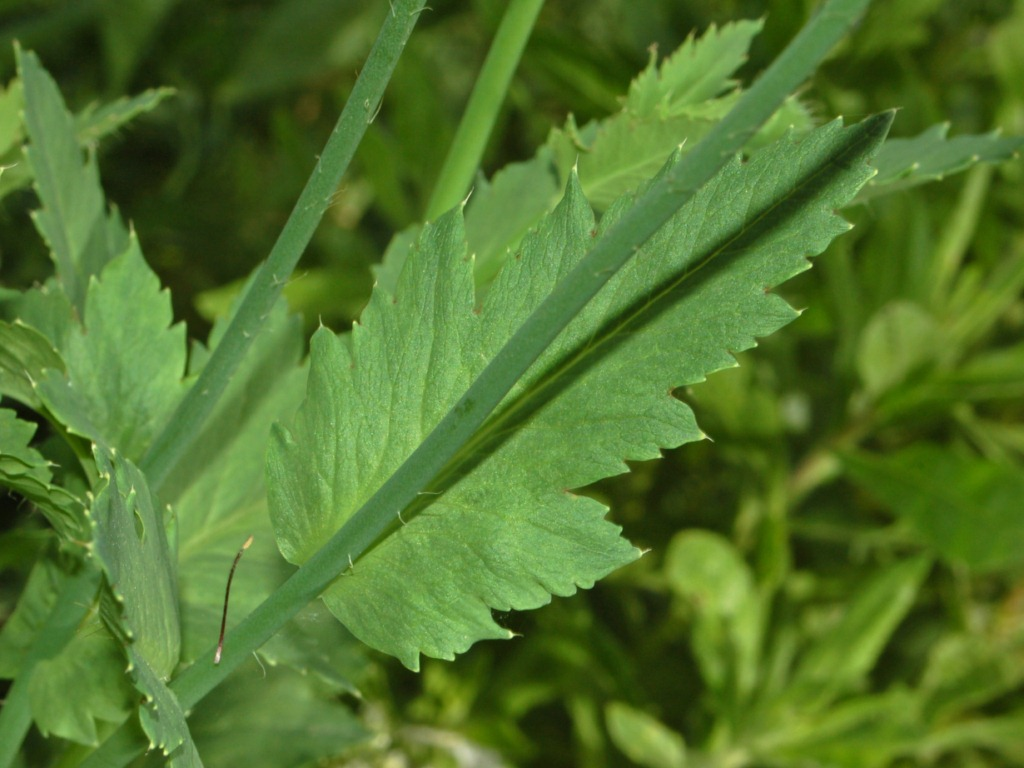
Leaf of Papaver setigerum
