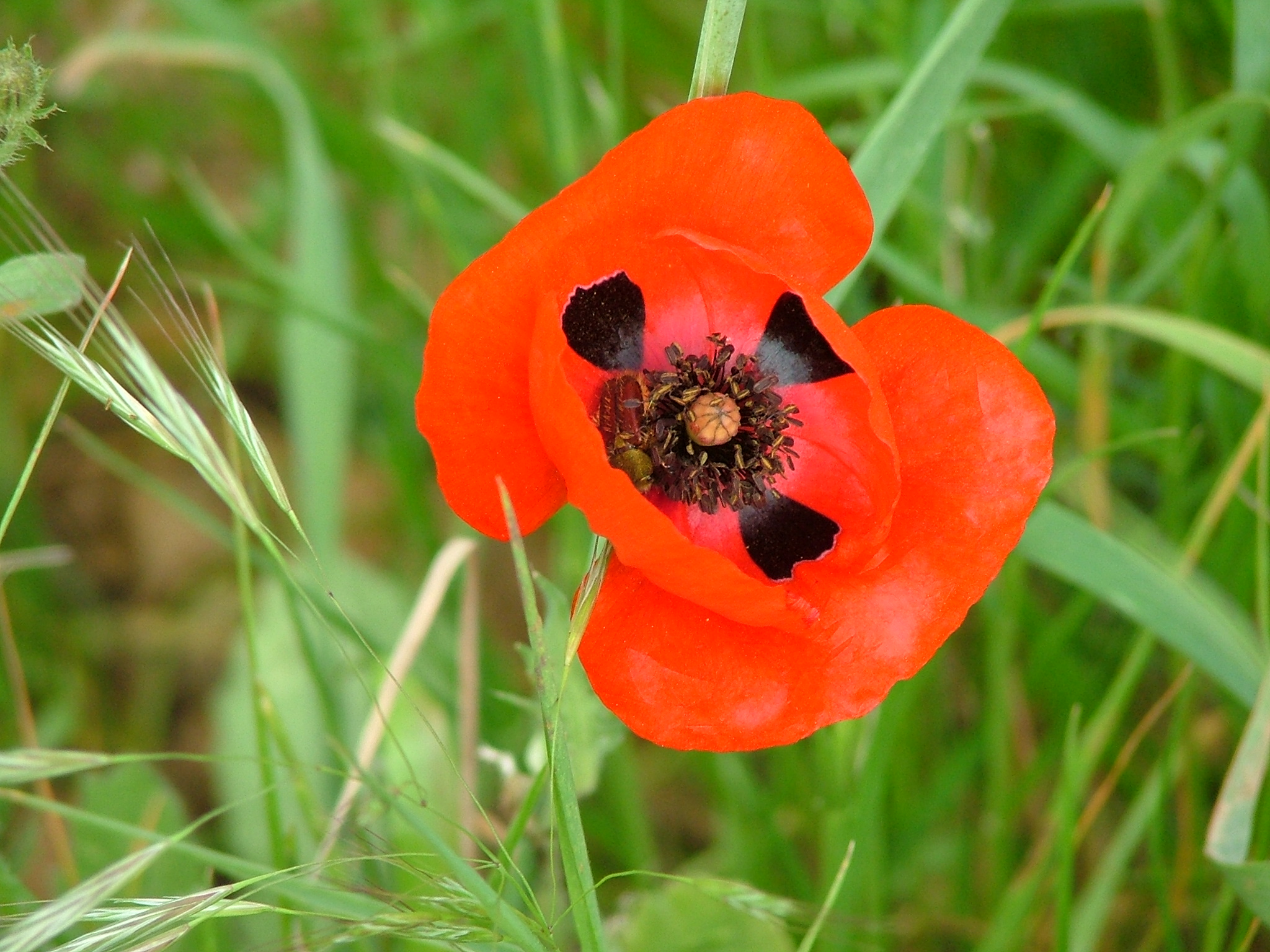

Scientific classification
- Kingdom: Plantae
- Clade: Tracheophytes
- Clade: Angiosperms
- Clade: Eudicots
- Order: Ranunculales
- Family: Papaveraceae
- Genus: Papaver
- Species: P. umbonatum

Binomial name
- Papaver umbonatum Boiss.

Synonyms
- Papaver stylatum Boiss. & Balansa; Papaver subpiriforme Fedde; Papaver syriacum Boiss. & Blanche

= Papaver umbonatum =

Species of flowering plant in the poppy family

Papaver umbonatum is a species of flowering plant in the family Papaveraceae. This species is also known more commonly as bossed or Semitic poppy. It is often misidentified as Papaver rhoeas (corn poppy, common in Europe), since they are very similar in form and appearance. Its native range includes the rocky plains of Turkey, Syria, Lebanon, Israel, and the Palestinian Territories.

== In the Levant ==
Papaver umbonatum grows throughout the Levant, from Turkey to the Palestine region. Papaver umbonatum has a hairy and bristly stem, and an unpleasant smell. The flower is pollinated by beetles from the Glaphyridae family, which are unique among insects in their ability to detect red color. Contrary to popular belief, the poppy is not a protected plant in Israel.

== Gallery ==
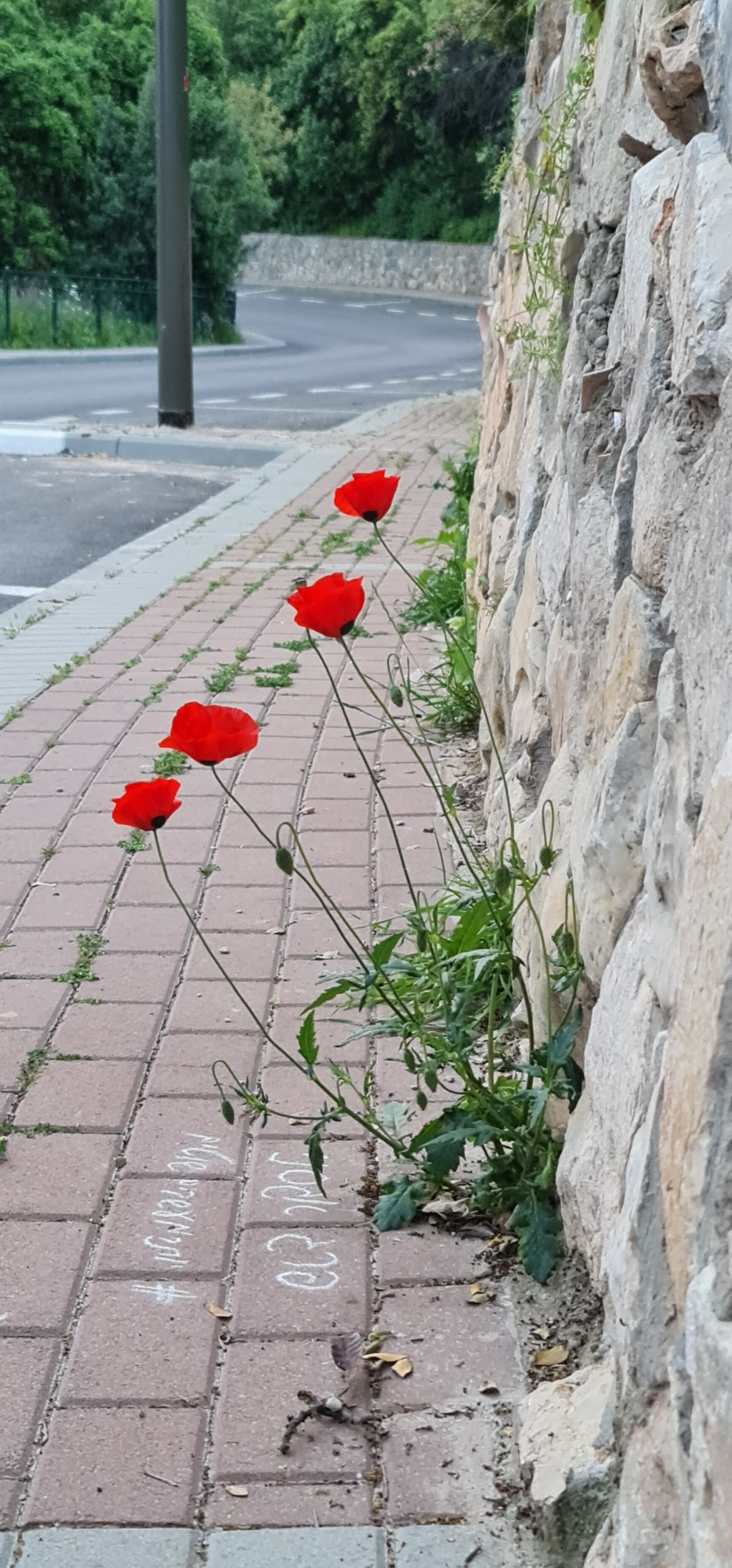
Papaver umbonatum growing on a sidewalk on a street in the city Nesher, Israel

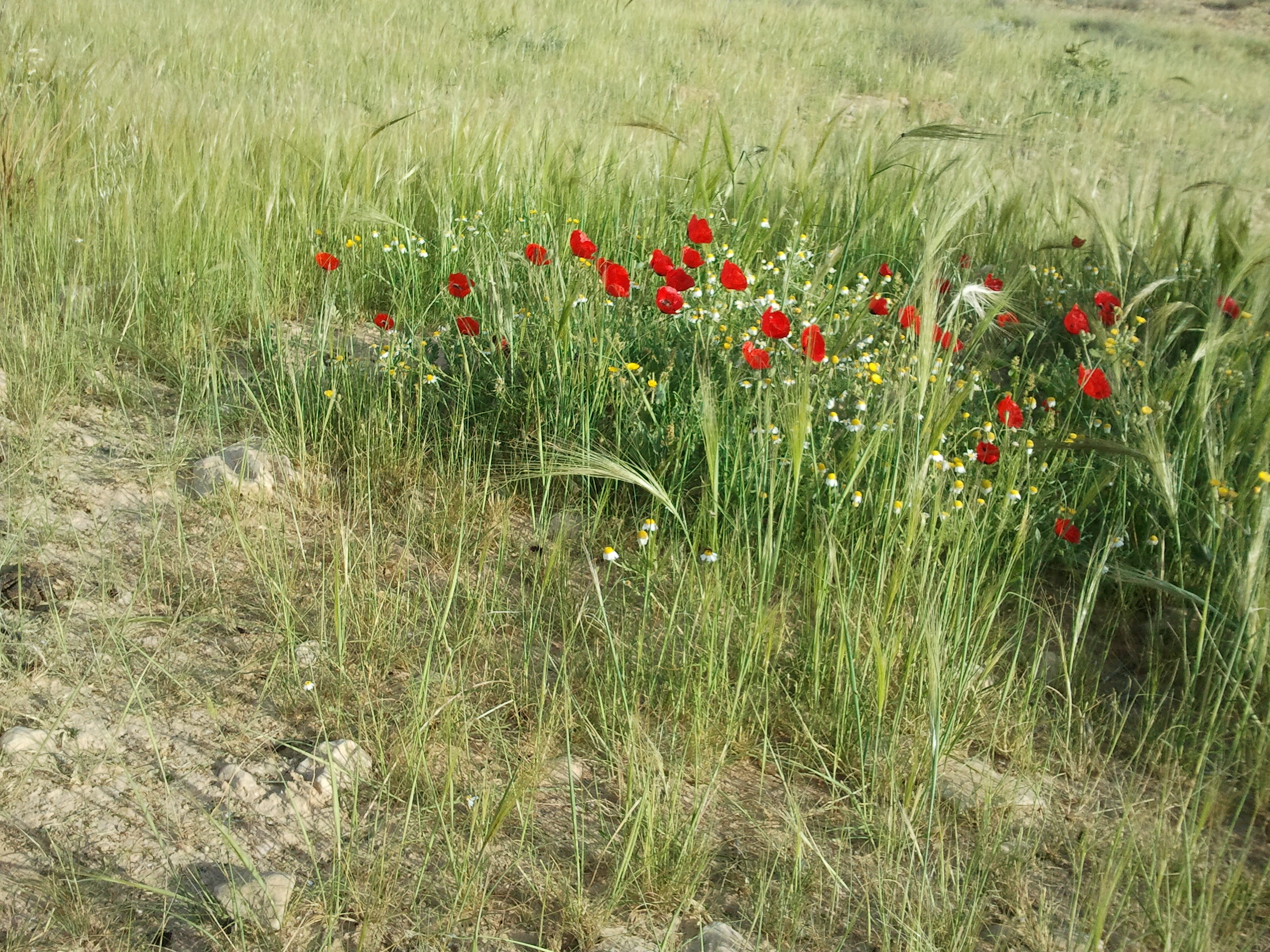
Papaver in Beer Sheva trail

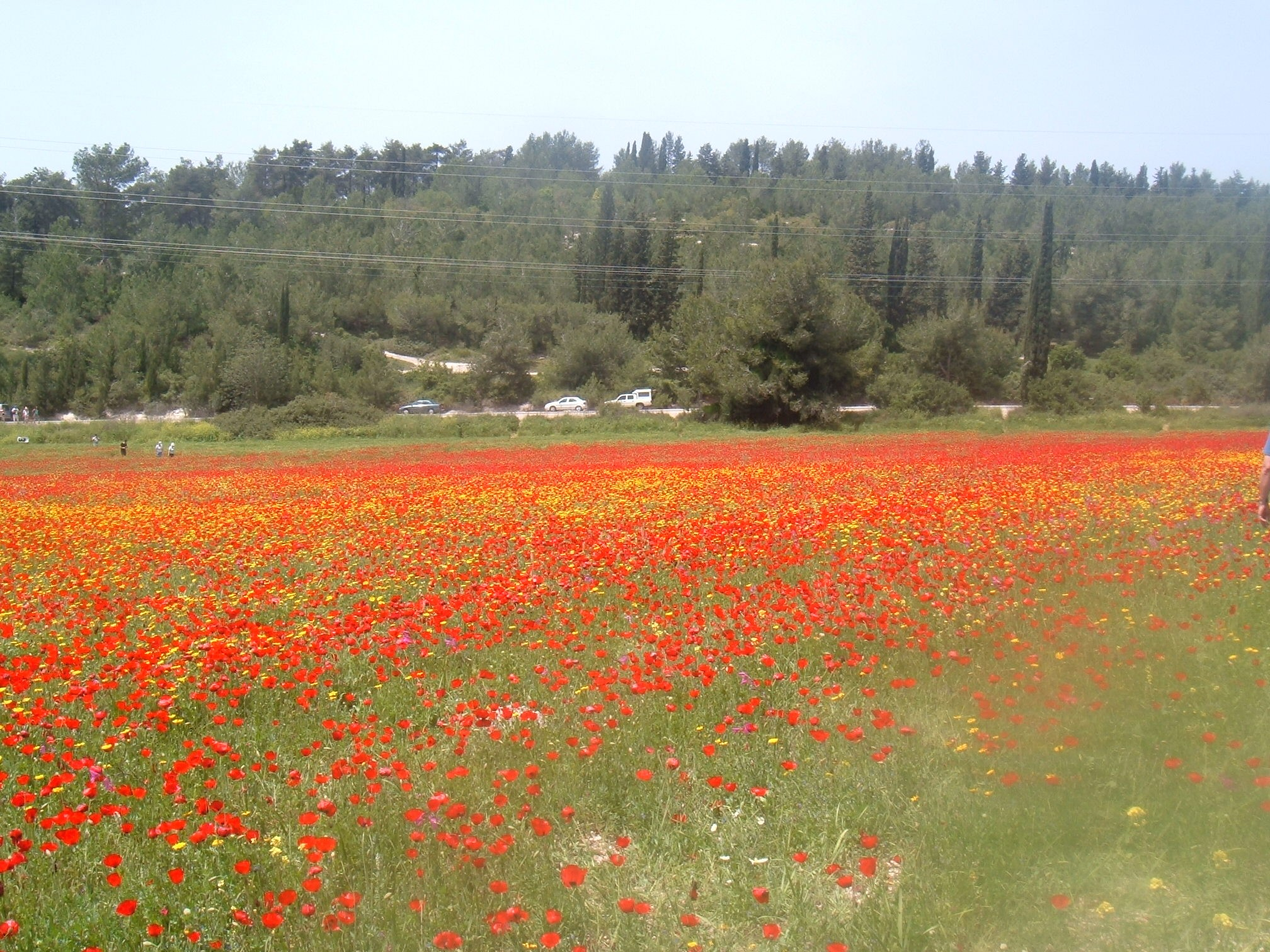
Papaver subpiriforme (synonym P. umbonatum) natural appearance on a meadow or field near Ein Hashofet, Israel

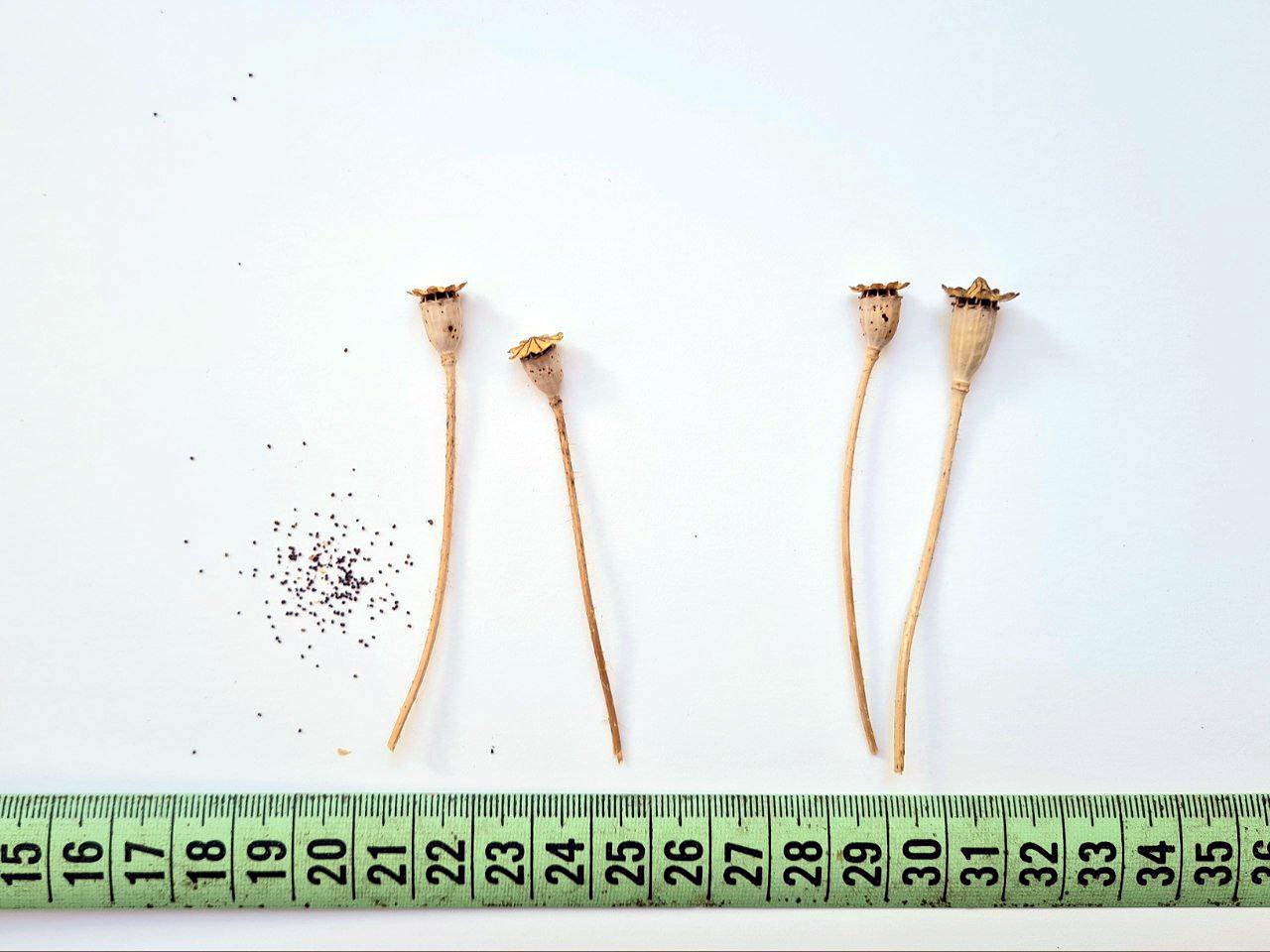
Fruits and seeds of Papaver umbonatum
