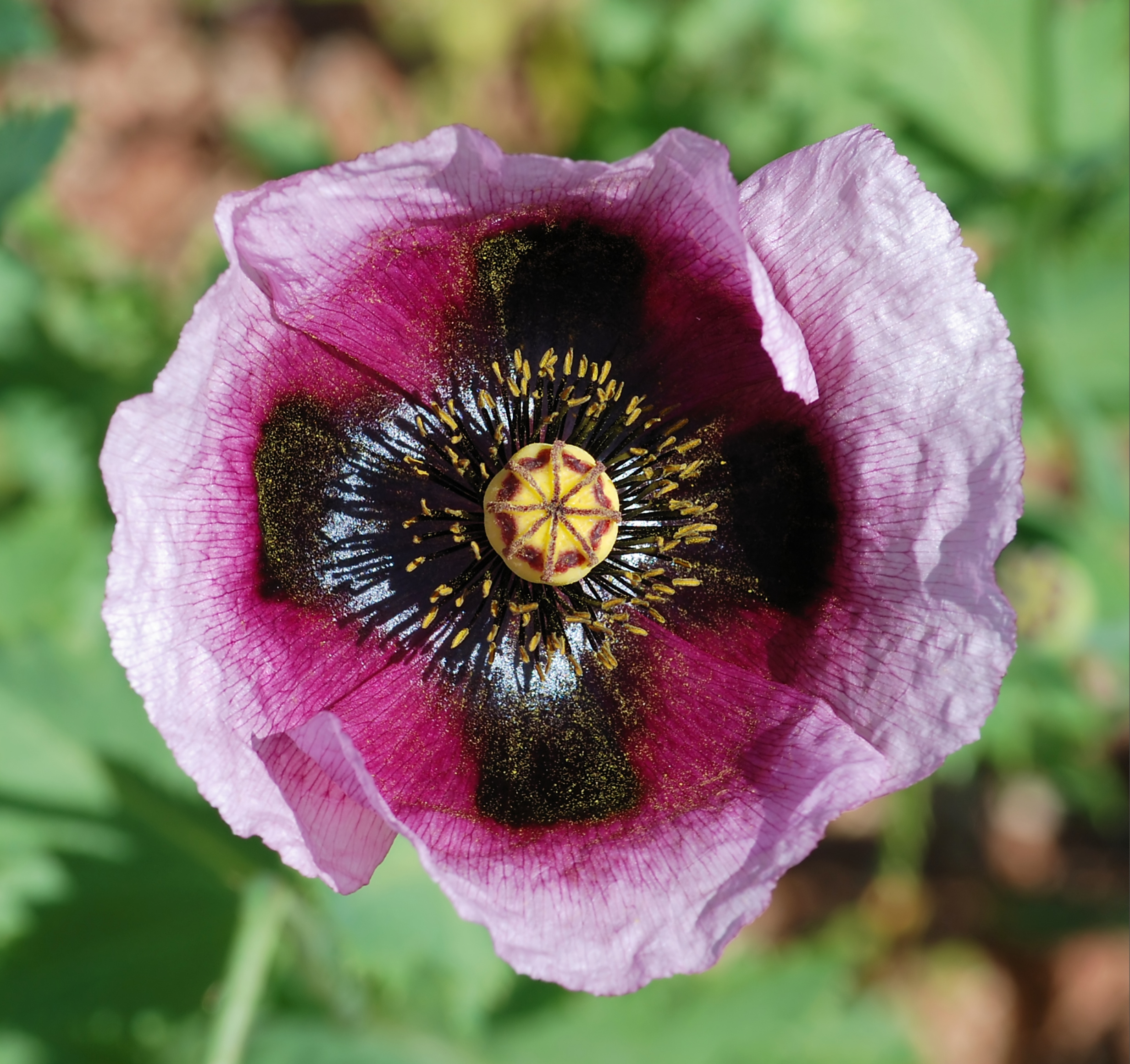
- Papaver setigerum

Scientific classification
- Kingdom: Plantae
- Clade: Embryophytes
- Clade: Tracheophytes
- Clade: Spermatophytes
- Clade: Angiosperms
- Clade: Eudicots
- Order: Ranunculales
- Family: Papaveraceae
- Subfamily: Papaveroideae
- Tribe: Papavereae
- Genus: Papaver; L.

Type species
- Papaver somniferum L.

= Papaver =

Genus of flowering plants in the poppy family

Papaver /pəˈpeɪvər/ is a genus of 70–100 species of frost-tolerant annuals, biennials, and perennials native to temperate and cold regions of Eurasia, Africa and North America. It is the type genus of the poppy family, Papaveraceae.

== Description ==
The flowers have two sepals that fall off as the bud opens, and four (or up to six) petals in red, pink, orange, yellow, or lilac. There are many stamens in several whorls around a compound pistil, which results from the fusion of carpels. The stigmas are visible on top of the capsule, and the number of stigmas corresponds to the number of fused carpels.

The ovary later develops into a dehiscing capsule, capped by the dried stigmas. The opened capsule scatters its numerous, tiny seeds as air movement shakes it, due to the long stem.

The typical Papaver gynoecium is superior (the flower is hypogynous) with a globular ovary. The style is characteristically absent for the type species opium poppy, and several others, although those with a style do exist. The sessile plate-like stigmata lies on top of the ovary. Pollen-receptive surfaces. The characteristic fruit type of Papaver is the unilocular capsule. The stigmatic disc rests on top of the capsule, and beneath it are dehiscent pores or valves.

== Taxonomy ==
Divided into a number of sections by Kiger (1973, 1985), the following are lectotypified with their lectotype species. Subsequent cladistic classification by Carolan et al. (2006) suggested Papaver was not monophyletic.

- Clade 1. P. sect. Meconella, Meconopsis
- Clade 2. P. sect. Carinatae, P. sect. Meconidium, P. sect. Oxytona, P. sect. Papaver, P. sect. Pilosa, P. sect. Pseudopilosa, P. cambrica, P. sect. Californicum, P. sect. Horrida and P. sect. Rhoeadium
- Clade 3. P. sect. Argemonidium, Roemeria refracta

The following are lectotypified with their lectotype species:

- P. sect. Carinatae (P. macrostomum Boiss. & Huet)
- P. sect. Oxytona (P. orientale L.)
- P. sect. Macrantha (P. orientale L.) - superfluous
- P. sect. Calomecon (Calomecon orientale)

== Phylogeny of Papaver and related genera ==
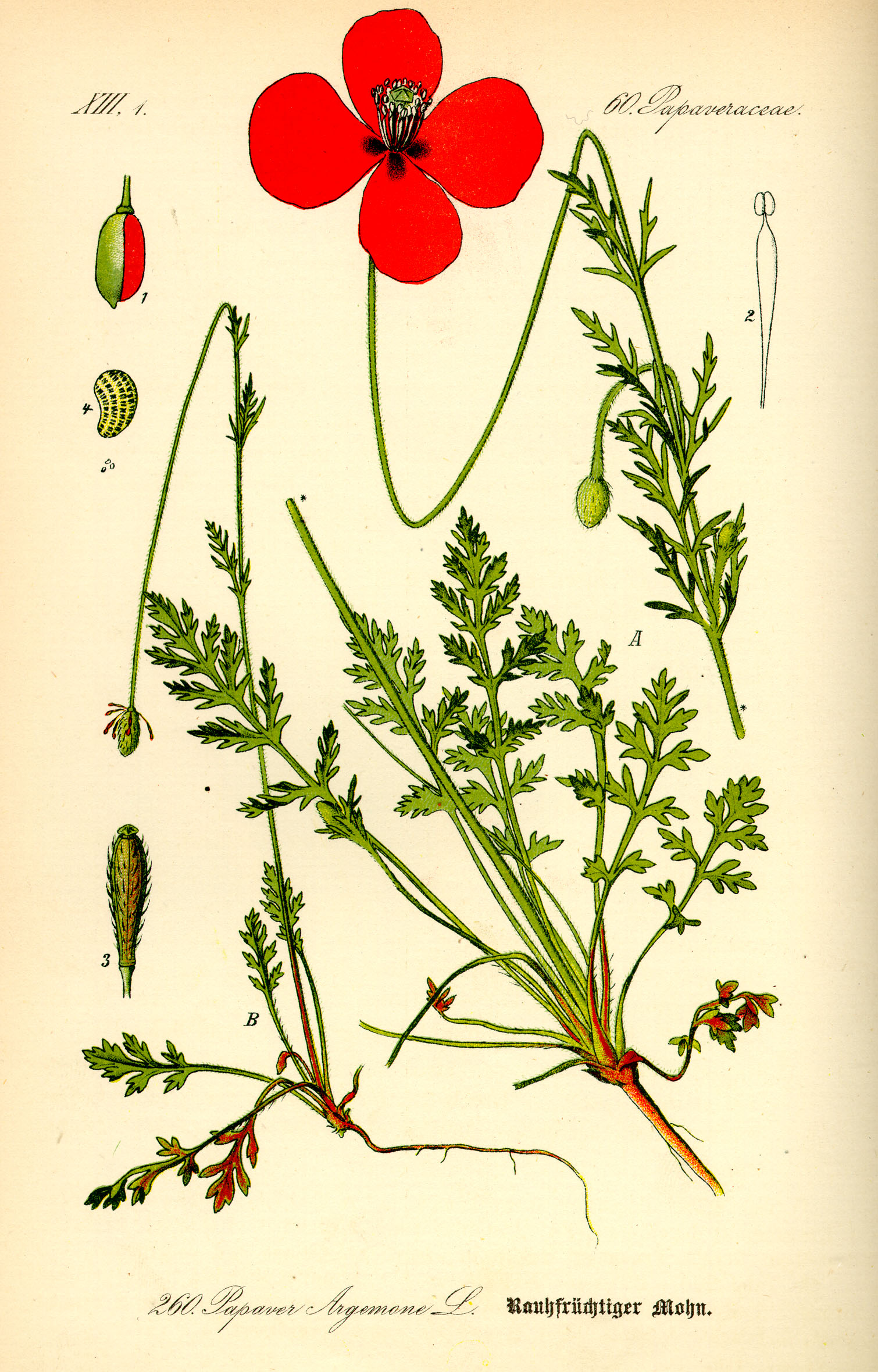
Illustration of Papaver argemone

Papaver sect. Argemonidium includes four annual, half-rosette species, P. argemone, P. pavonium, P. apulum, and P. hybridum (Kadereit 1986a). Papaver apulum, P. argemone and P. pavonium occur allopatrically from the Adriatic Sea to the Himalayan range. P. hybridum is distributed widely from the Himalayas to Macaronesian Islands. These species are easily distinguished in petal and capsule characters, but are clearly closely related according to molecular analysis. Argemonidium is a sister group to all other Papaver sections, with characteristic indels. Morphological characters also support this distinction, including the presence of an apical plug in the capsules, long internodes above the basal leaf rosette, bristly capsules and polyporate pollen grains. Carolan et al. (2006) supported Kadereit et al. (1997)'s suggestions that Argemonidium and Roemeria are in fact sister taxa. They share some morphological characters that distinguish them from Papaver, including polyporate pollen grains, and long internodes superior the basal leaf rosette. Previous taxonomies of the Old World clade did include the close relationship between Argemonidium and Roemeria, nor Argemonidium's distinctness from Papaver s.s. Carolan suggest Argemonidium be elevated to genus status, with Roemeria a sub-genus.

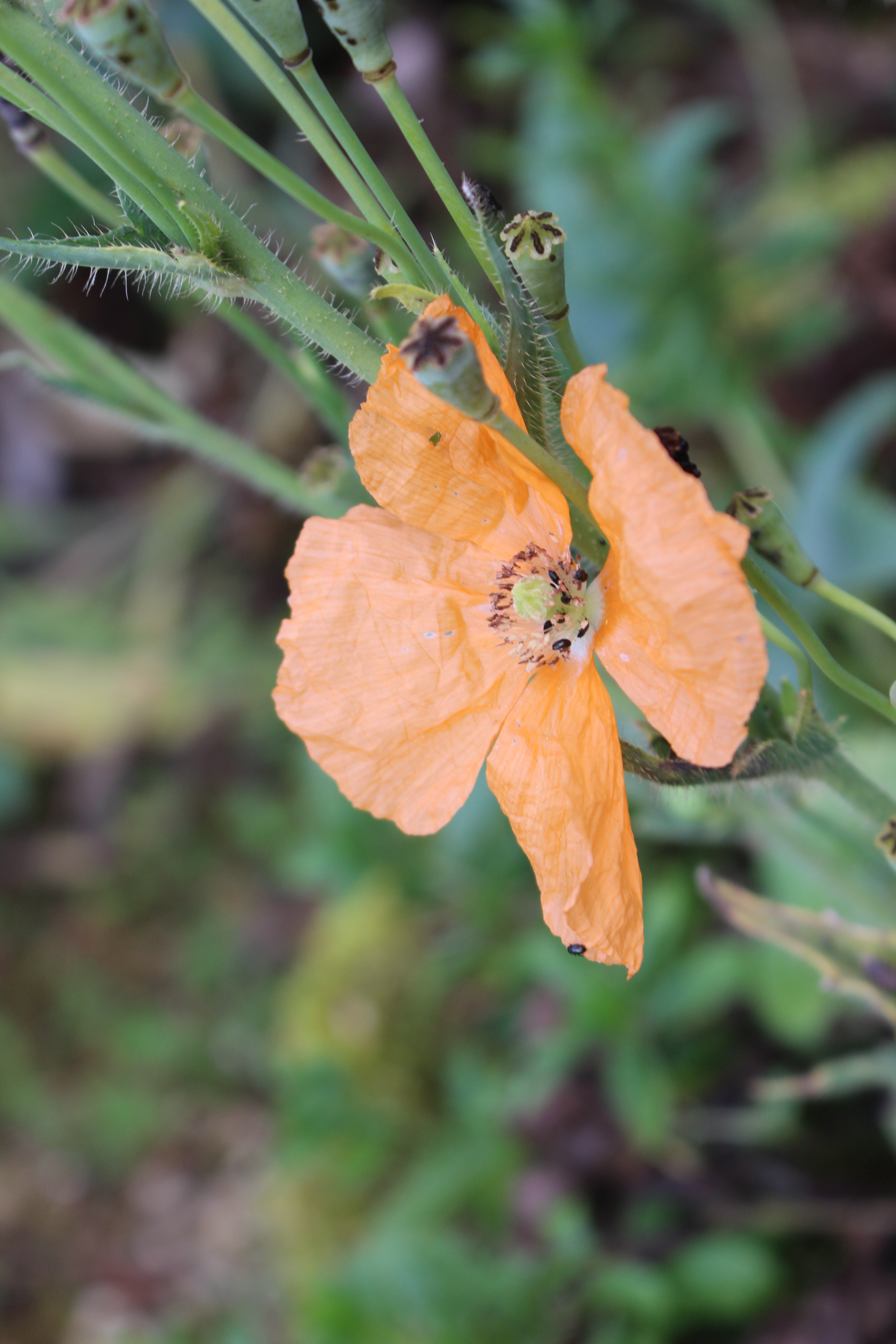
Papaver spicatum

Papaver sect. Meconella is widely distributed, with populations spanning central, inner and eastern Asia, Siberia, Scandinavia, northern Greenland, Canada, the Rocky Mountains, and regions of Europe. It has been distinguished from other Papaver sections morphologically by its bristly, valvate capsules, pinnatisect leaves, pale stamen, and white, orange or yellow corolla. Older taxonomies divided Meconella into two groups based on degree of leaf dissection (finely dissected leaves vs. broad leaf lobes). Kadereit (1990) and Kadereit and Sytsma (1992) regarded finely dissected leaves as a derived character, and suggested that Meconella formed a group with Argemonidium as sister to other Papaver sects. Bittkau and Kadereit (2002) demonstrated that for P. alpinum s.l. broad leaf lobes were ancestral. Carolan et al. (2006) resolved Meconopsis as sister to sect. Meconella, forming a sister clade to the rest of Papaver, excluding Argemonidium. Meconella possesses a sessile stigmatic disc, similar to the typical discs of Papaver sect. Papaver., yet differences in the disc and other morphological characters have led to suggestions that this feature may not be homologous. The results of the Carolan et al. (2006) analysis present a major problem to previous taxonomy of the genera Meconopsis, and Papaver. As several species of Meconopsis (excluding M. cambrica) and P. Meconella resolved as a monophyletic group, sister to other Papaver sects., either Meconella must be elevated to genus status, or combined with the Asian species of Meconopsis, as a subgenus of Papaver.

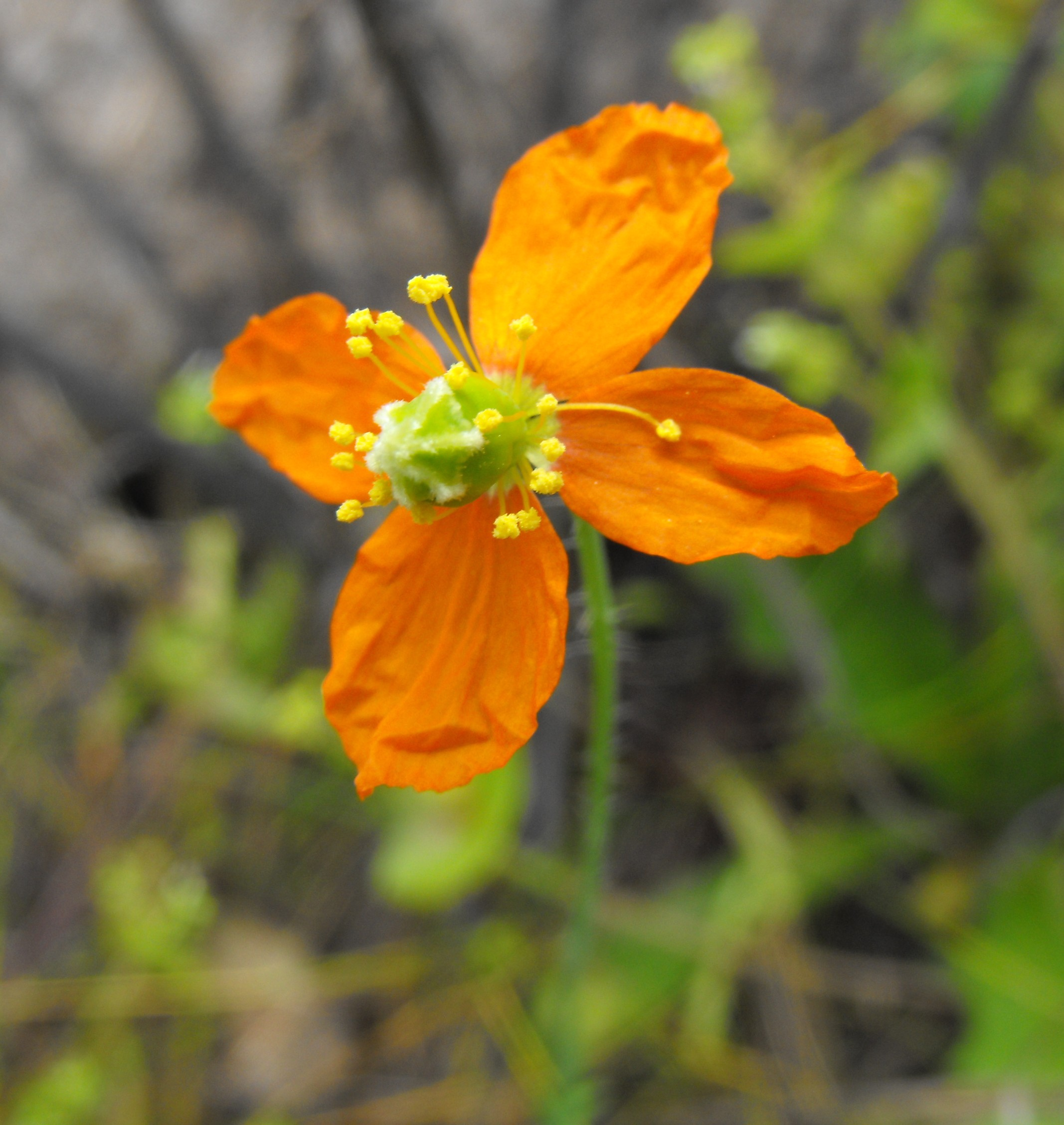
The fire poppy, Papaver californicum, is placed in a section, Papaver sect. Californicum, on its own.

Papaver sects. Californicum and Horrida have unique geographic distributions in relation to the rest of the genus. Horrida is represented by a single species Papaver aculeatum of, an annual flower native to South Africa. The capsule is glabrous narrow, long and poricidal. The vegetative parts are covered with setae, and the growth form is a rosette with rarely branching axes, and narrowly elliptical incised leaves. P. sect. californicum, is also represented by a single annual species, of the same name. As the name implies, it is native to western North America, and is characterized by a slender, ribbed, glabrous capsule, a racemose inflorescence, yellow anthers and filaments, and valvate capsule dehiscece. Previous morphological-based taxonomies of these species have led to unreliable groupings. Horrida and Pilosa have racemose inflorescences, pale filiform filaments and long capsules with flat stigmatic discs, while P. californicum and sect. Meconidium share valvate capsule dehiscence and pale filaments, but geographically these species are distinct, and do not follow molecular evidence. Commonality among these features is therefore hypothesized to be a result of convergence. In Carolan et al.'s (2006) combined ITS, trnL-F trees, both Horrida and Californicum attach to basal nodes within the main clade Papaver. Kadereit et al. (1997) postulated that Stylomecon heterophylla arose from within Papaver and should not be relegated as a separate genus. S. heterophylla and P. californicum are both native to southwestern North America, and share habitats. They are also morphologically similar, sharing glabrous buds, bright orange corollas, and yellow anthers. Their capsules are different, with S. heterophylla possessing a distinct style that is reminiscent of those in many Meconopsis species. However, Carolan et al.'s (2006) analysis strongly supports a monophyletic group for S. heterophylla and P. californicum, sister to the core Papaver sects, with Horrida, basal to that grouping. They recommended that both sects. Californicum and Horrida be elevated to "subgenera" within Papaver. The authors reject the genus status of Stylomecon.

Meconopsis is composed of mostly Asian dwelling species, and a single European representative, M. cambrica. Kadereit et al. (1997) first provided evidence that this relationship is not monophyletic. Carolan et al. (2006) confirmed the separation of M. cambrica from the rest of Meconopsis. In fact, it forms a well-supported sister-group to the core sections of Papaver, excluding Argemonidium, Californicum, Horrida and Meconella.

The core sections of Papaver s.s. form a well-supported clade, consisting of Pseudopilosa, Pilosa, Papaver, Carinatae, Meconidium, Oxytona, and Rhoeadium. Pseudopilosa spp. have a subscapose growth habit, and their distribution includes south-western Asia, northern Africa and southern Spain. There are some leaves on the lower part of the flower axis carrying a single flower. Carolan et al.'s (2006) analysis placed Pseudopilosa as sister to the remaining Papaver s.s. sections. Pilosa is a single species, P. pilosum, found mostly in western Turkey Sects. Pilosa and Pseudopilosa are separated based on morphological and chemical differences.

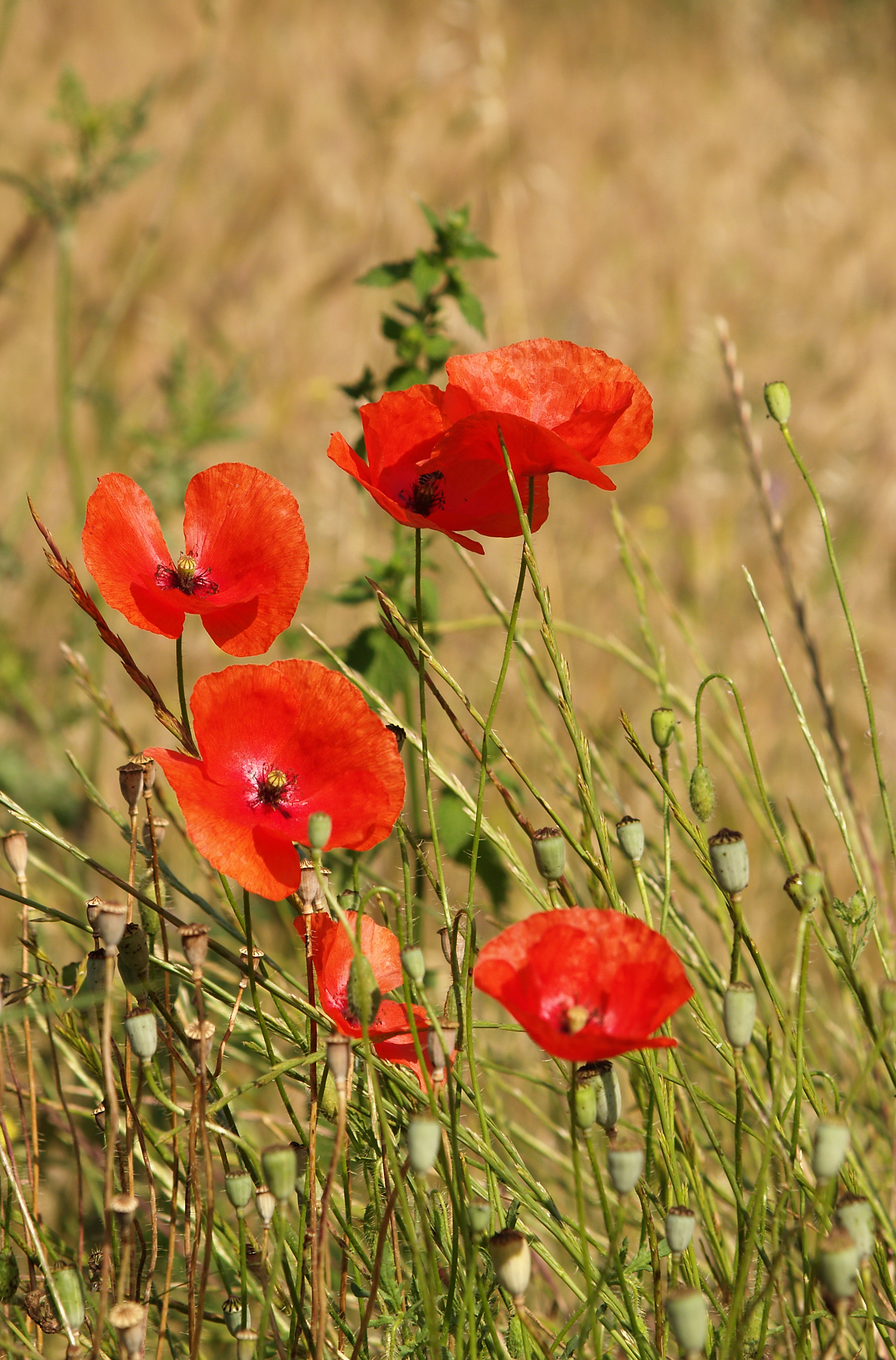
Papaver rhoeas, a common poppy across Europe

The monophyly of Carinatae, Papaver and Rhoeadium is questionable based on current molecular evidence. Papaver sect. Rhoeadium comprises seventeen annual species. Carolan et al. (2006) use three representative species, P. commutatum, P. dubium, and P. rhoeas for their genetic analysis. The geographic center of Rhoeadium's diversity is in south-western Asia and the Aegean area. They have poricidal capsules and usually dark filaments. This section is morphologically diverse however, leading Kadereit (1989) to recognize three distinct groups. The first comprises species with tetraploid and hexaploid genomes, with long capsules. The second group contains diploid species and diverse morphologies. The third group consists of diploid species and uniform morphologies. Carolan et al. (2006) showed some incongruences between their trnL-F and ITS maximum parsimony trees, showing weak support for Kadereit's (1989) groupings. Further analyses with more species and more samples will be necessary to resolve the phylogeny at this level.

Papaver has traditionally been characterized by the absence of a stigma, and the presence of a sessile stigmatic disc. Carolan et al. (2006) demonstrated that several species with this trait however are closely related to taxa possessing a style e.g. S. heterophylla and P. californicum, and P. sect. Meconella and Asian Meconopsis. This evidence, in combination with morphological differences among the discs suggests convergent evolutionary pathways. Papaver has long been considered the most derived clade within Papaveroideae, due to the belief that the stigmatic disc was an apomorphous characteristic. Sections Meconella and Californicum exhibit valvate dehiscence, and their basal position within Papaver suggest this may be an ancestral form. Its presence in Meconidium, however, suggests it is also a synapomorphy within that group.

Note: Meconella (not to be confused with the genus Meconella) has an alpine and circumpolar arctic distribution and includes some of the most northerly-growing vascular land plants.

== Species ==
As of 2025 according to Plants of the World Online there are 68 accepted species in the genus.

- Papaver acrochaetum
- Papaver aculeatum – South African poppy
- Papaver alberti
- Papaver albiflorum
- Papaver arachnoideum
- Papaver arenarium
- Papaver armeniacum
- Papaver atlanticum
- Papaver bipinnatum
- Papaver bracteatum
- Papaver cambricum
- Papaver carmeli
- Papaver chelidoniifolium
- Papaver clavatum
- Papaver commutatum
- Papaver confine
- Papaver crassifolium
- Papaver curviscapum
- Papaver cyprium
- Papaver decaisnei
- Papaver dubium – long-headed poppy, blindeyes
- Papaver glabrum
- Papaver glaucum – tulip poppy, Turkish red poppy
- Papaver gorgoneum
- Papaver gorovanicum
- Papaver gracile
- Papaver halophilum
- Papaver heterophyllum
- Papaver holophyllum
- Papaver humile
- Papaver kachroianum
- Papaver laevigatum
- Papaver lateritium
- Papaver lecoqii – Yellow-juiced Poppy
- Papaver libanoticum
- Papaver macrostomum
- Papaver maculosum
- Papaver mairei
- Papaver malviflorum
- Papaver maschukense
- Papaver oreophilum
- Papaver orientale
- Papaver pamporicum
- Papaver paphium
- Papaver pasquieri
- Papaver persicum
- Papaver pilosum
- Papaver pinnatifidum
- Papaver piptostigma
- Papaver postii
- Papaver purpureomarginatum
- Papaver rechingeri
- Papaver rhoeas – common poppy, corn poppy, annual poppy, Flanders poppy, Shirley poppy
- Papaver roseolum
- Papaver rupifragum – Atlas poppy, Moroccan poppy, Spanish poppy
- Papaver schelkovnikovii
- Papaver setiferum – Oriental poppy
- Papaver sheperdii
- Papaver somniferum – Opium poppy, breadseed poppy (Type species)
- Papaver stewartianum
- Papaver talyshense
- Papaver tenuifolium
- Papaver tichomirovii
- Papaver umbonatum – Semitic poppy, Israeli poppy
- Papaver yildirimlii
- Papaver zangesurum

Many species that were classified in Papaver have been moved to other names. Species previously placed here include:

- Meconopsis quintuplinervia (Papaver quintuplinervium)
- Oreomecon alpina (Papaver alpinum, including the synonyms Papaver aurantiacum, Papaver burseri, Papaver degenii, and Papaver sendtneri)
- Oreomecon crocea (Papaver croceum)
- Oreomecon dahliana (Papaver dahlianum)
- Oreomecon lapponica (Papaver lapponicum)
- Oreomecon nudicaulis (Papaver nudicaule)
- Oreomecon pygmaea (Papaver pygmaeum)
- Oreomecon radicata (Papaver radicatum)
- Roemeria argemone (Papaver argemone)
- Roemeria sicula (Papaver hybridum)

== History and uses ==
Poppies have been grown as ornamental plants since 5000 BC in Mesopotamia. They were found in Egyptian tombs. In Greek mythology, the poppy was associated with Demeter, goddess of fertility and agriculture. The origin of the cultural symbol was probably Minoan Crete, because a figurine known as the "poppy goddess" was found at a Minoan sanctuary in Crete.

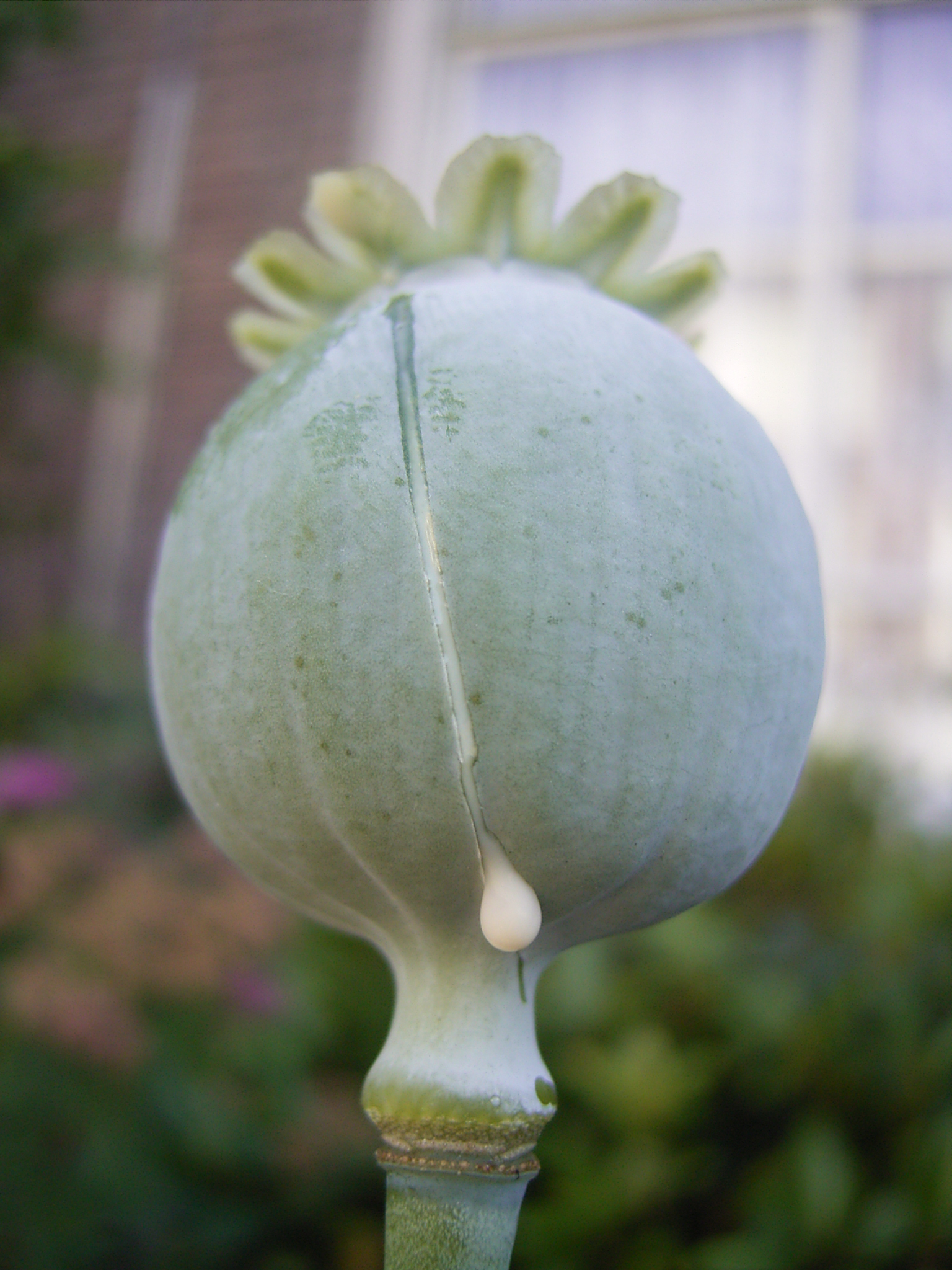
The seed-heads of Papaver somniferum are slit to release the latex, which contains various alkaloids.

In the course of history, poppies have always been attributed important medicinal properties. The stems contain a milky latex that may cause skin irritation, and the latex in the opium poppy (Papaver somniferum) contains several narcotic alkaloids, including morphine and codeine. The alkaloid rhoeadine, derived from the flowers of the corn poppy (Papaver rhoeas), is used as a mild sedative. Poppy seeds are used in baking and cooking, and poppyseed oil is used in cooking and pharmaceuticals, and as a radiocontrast agent.

The ancient Greeks portrayed Hypnos, Nyx and Thanatos, the gods of sleep, night and death, with the symbol of the poppy. The earliest written record appeared in the eighth century BC. Early Greek accounts seem to indicate the plant was used for euthanasia; on some Greek islands, women used it in old age to shorten the time left until natural death. Hippocrates (460–377 BC) was one of the first to emphasize the medicinal uses of the poppy and outline several methods of preparation. He described poppy juice as narcotic, hypnotic, and cathartic. He also recognized the plant's uses as food, particularly the seeds. By the first century AD, Dioskorides wrote down the first poppy taxonomy. He distinguished between several different kinds, the first of which was the "cultivated" or "garden" poppies. He further distinguished two types within this category, ones with black and others with white seeds. Both had elongated capsules and the black-seeded variety was involuted. Historians speculate this variety was Papaver somniferum. Other species were in use, as well. Dioskorides named the "flowering" poppy as a type with strong hypnotic properties. This is believed to be Papaver hybridum. Finally, the "wild" poppy he described is believed to be Papaver orientale. Pliny the Elder, a Roman historian, later mentioned an "intermediate" type between the wild and cultivated poppy, likely Papaver rhoeas. He wrote about medical applications of the plant; the leaves and capsules were boiled in water to create juice, pressed and rubbed to create tablets, and the dried latex was used to form opium. These products were used in much the same way they are in many cultures today, to promote sleep and to relieve indigestion and respiratory problems.

A century later, Galen wrote even more extensively about the diverse applications of various poppy products. He wrote that opium was the strongest known drug for dulling the senses and for inducing sleep. He wrote about its use to treat a variety of ailments, including eye and lung inflammation.

The First (1839–1842) and Second Opium Wars (1856–1860) between China and Great Britain resulted from attempts by successive Chinese emperors to suppress increasing imports of opium into the country. In the first half of the 19th century, poppy seed oil was an important food crop, but large-scale production did not begin until Europe began to manufacture morphine in the mid-19th century. While 800–1000 tons of Indian opium are processed legally each year, this represents only an estimated 5% of total opium production worldwide; the majority is produced illegally. The first factory specializing in dry capsule processing was built in 1928.

Today, morphine and codeine are common alkaloids found in several poppy varieties, and are important drugs for much of the world. Australia, Turkey and India are the most important producers of poppy for medicinal use, while the US, the UK, France, Australia and Hungary are the largest processors. In the United States, opium is illegal, as is possession or cultivation of the flower itself. However, the law is seldom enforced when poppies are grown for culinary or ornamental use. The Opium Poppy Control Act Of 1942 led to the "Poppy Rebellion", and a battle between California farmers and the federal government. Today, the law and its enforcement remain vague and controversial, even inciting episodes between gardeners and "the poppy police".

They are also sold as cut flowers in flower arrangements, especially the Iceland poppy.
