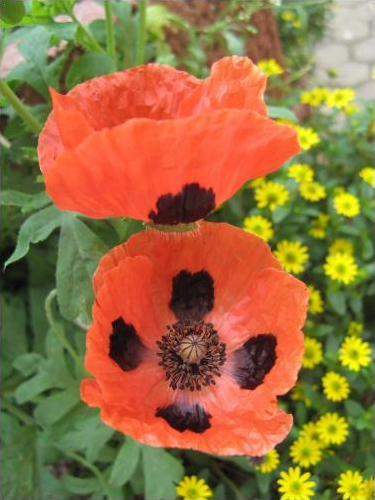

Scientific classification
- Kingdom: Plantae
- Clade: Tracheophytes
- Clade: Angiosperms
- Clade: Eudicots
- Order: Ranunculales
- Family: Papaveraceae
- Genus: Papaver
- Species: P. commutatum

Binomial name
- Papaver commutatum Fisch. & C.A.Mey.

= Papaver commutatum =

Species of plant

Papaver commutatum, the Caucasian scarlet poppy, is a species of flowering plant in the family Papaveraceae native to northern Turkey, northwestern Iran and the Caucasus. It is an erect annual growing to 45 cm (18 in) tall by 15 cm (6 in) wide, with hairy stalks and leaves. The flower is bowl-shaped and about 8 cm (3 in) in diameter, bright red with prominent black blotches at the bases of the petals, and is borne in early summer. The flowers are followed by spherical seed heads.

The Latin specific epithet commutatum means “changed”, referring to a change of name from another species.

The cultivar P. commutatum 'Ladybird' is a popular and easy garden annual for a sunny position in a moist, fertile spot. It bears many flowers on each plant and blooms from late spring to early summer. It is frequently a feature of cultivated wildflower meadows. It has gained the Royal Horticultural Society's Award of Garden Merit, as has the species.

The main alkaloid of this species is isocorydine.
