= Papaver libanoticum =

Scientific classification
- Kingdom: Plantae
- Clade: Tracheophytes
- Clade: Angiosperms
- Clade: Eudicots
- Order: Ranunculales
- Family: Papaveraceae
- Genus: Papaver
- Species: P. libanoticum

Binomial name
- Papaver libanoticum Boiss.

Synonyms
- Papaver armeniacum var. libanoticum (Boiss.) Kuntze

Species of flowering plant

Papaver libanoticum, the Lebanon poppy, is a perennial flowering plant in the family Papaveraceae. Endemic to the high-altitude mountainous zones of the Lebanon, Syria and southern Turkey, the species is of significant interest to botanical and pharmacological researchers due to its distinct morphological features and its potent alkaloid profile.

== Description ==
Papaver libanoticum is a small perennial herb, growing to heights between 5 and 30 cm. The leaves form a basal rosette and are elongate, pinnately divided, and covered with dense silky-white hairs. Solitary flowers are borne on slender, hairy stems. The flowers have four wrinkled petals, pale orange to orange-red in colour. The center contains light-colored stamens with pale anthers. The plant exudes yellow-orange latex when damaged. The capsule is narrow, glabrous and blue-black, with four stigmatic rays.

== Distribution and habitat ==
The species is native to the high-alpine rocky environments of the Eastern Mediterranean. Its primary distribution includes: Lebanon: Specifically found along the slopes of the Mount Lebanon range, the Makmel mountain block, and near the Cedars of God; Syria, with populations recorded in the sub-alpine zones of Mount Hermon (Jabal al-Shaykh); and Southern Turkey, in highly localized pockets of the Taurus Mountains. Papaver libanoticum is strictly a high-altitude specialist, thriving primarily on scree slopes, gravelly ledges, and limestone fissures at elevations ranging between 2,000 and 2,650 meters above sea level.

== Phytochemical and pharmacological research ==
=== Analgesic activity ===
In an animal study, an ethanolic extract of P. libanoticum produced dose-dependent responses in tail-flick and hot-plate assays. The reported effect was greatest three hours after administration and remained detectable for up to 24 hours. Naloxone reduced the observed analgesic response, which the authors interpreted as evidence of opioid-receptor involvement.

=== Isolated alkaloids ===
Alkaloids reported from P. libanoticum include dehydroremerine, roemerine, berberine, alborine, remrefidine and mecambrine.

=== Cytotoxic activity ===
Extracts and isolated compounds from P. libanoticum have been tested for cytotoxicity in vitro against MCF-7 breast-cancer and HCT116 colorectal-cancer cell lines.

== See also ==
- Flora of Lebanon
