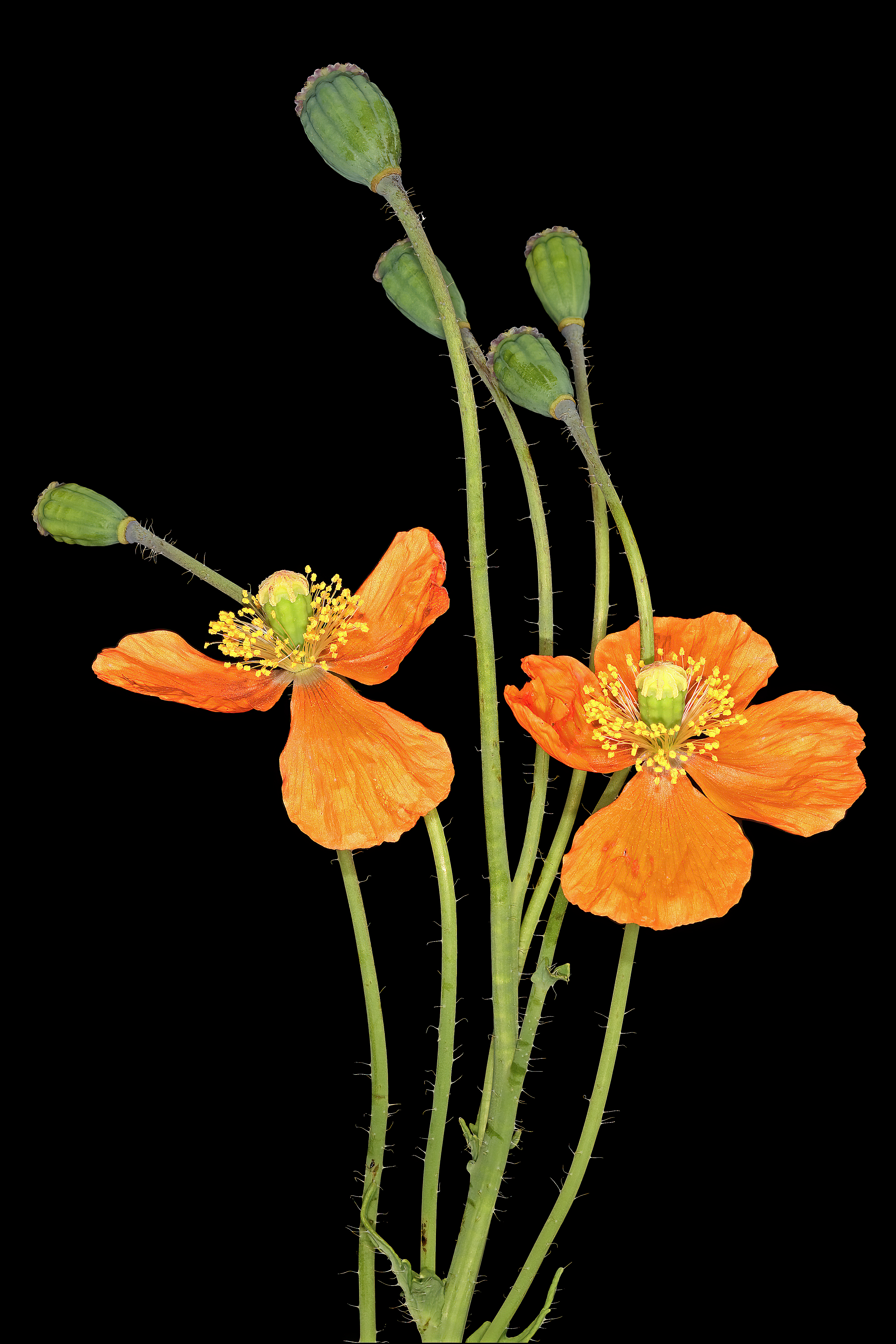
- Flowers and seed capsules
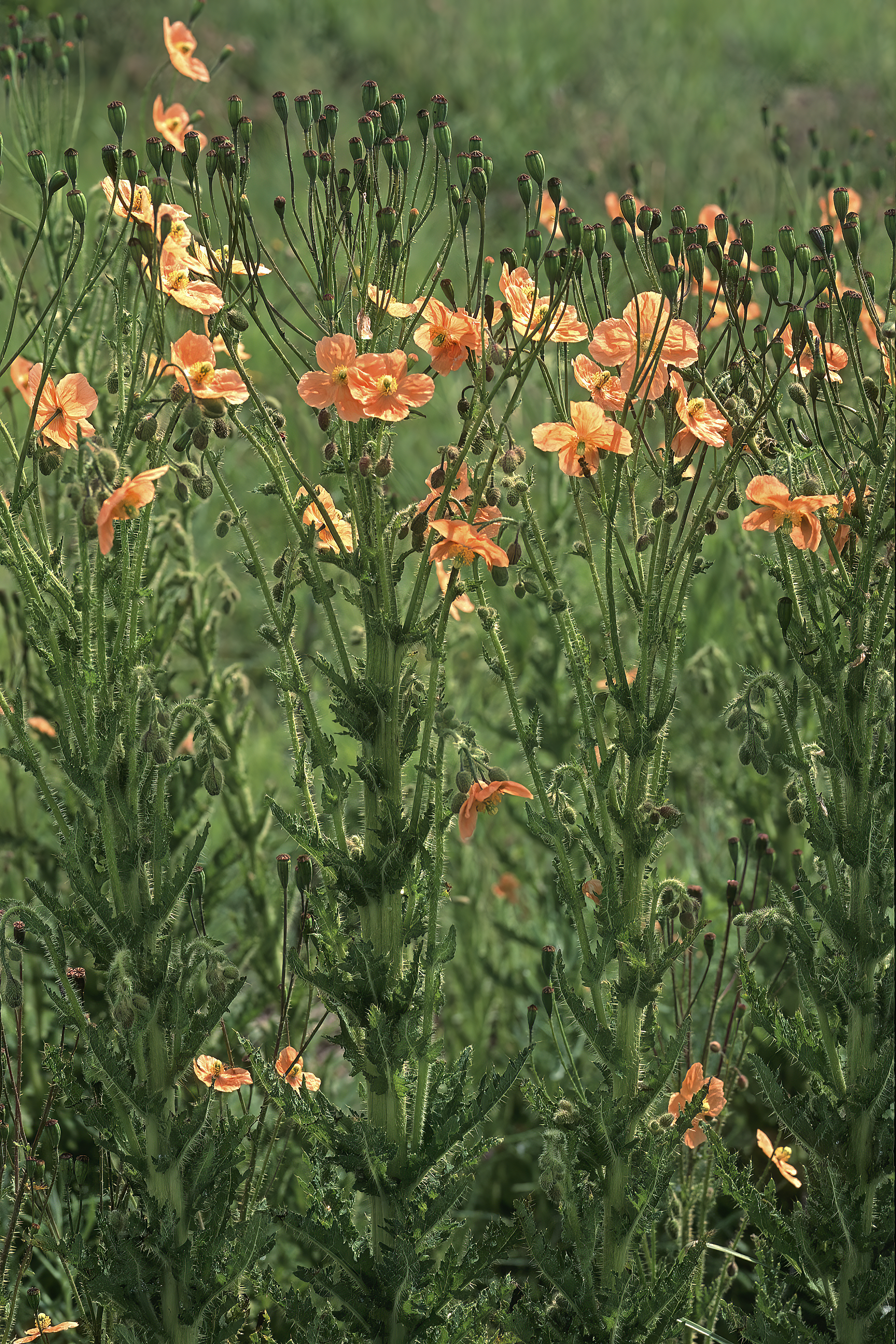
- Habit

Scientific classification
- Kingdom: Plantae
- Clade: Tracheophytes
- Clade: Angiosperms
- Clade: Eudicots
- Order: Ranunculales
- Family: Papaveraceae
- Genus: Papaver
- Species: P. aculeatum

Binomial name
- Papaver aculeatum Thunb.

Synonyms
- Papaver aculeatum var. pusillum F.Muell.; Papaver gariepinum Burch. ex DC.; Papaver horridum DC.; Papaver multiflorum Burm.f.; Papaver nudum Burm.f.

= Papaver aculeatum =

Species of plant

Papaver aculeatum, the bristle poppy, orange poppy or South African poppy, is a species of flowering plant in the family Papaveraceae. It is native to Namibia, South Africa, and Lesotho, and has been introduced to eastern and southern Australia. It is the only species of poppy native to the Southern Hemisphere. An upright annual reaching 1.8 m (6 ft), it is found growing in a wide variety of habitats and soil types
