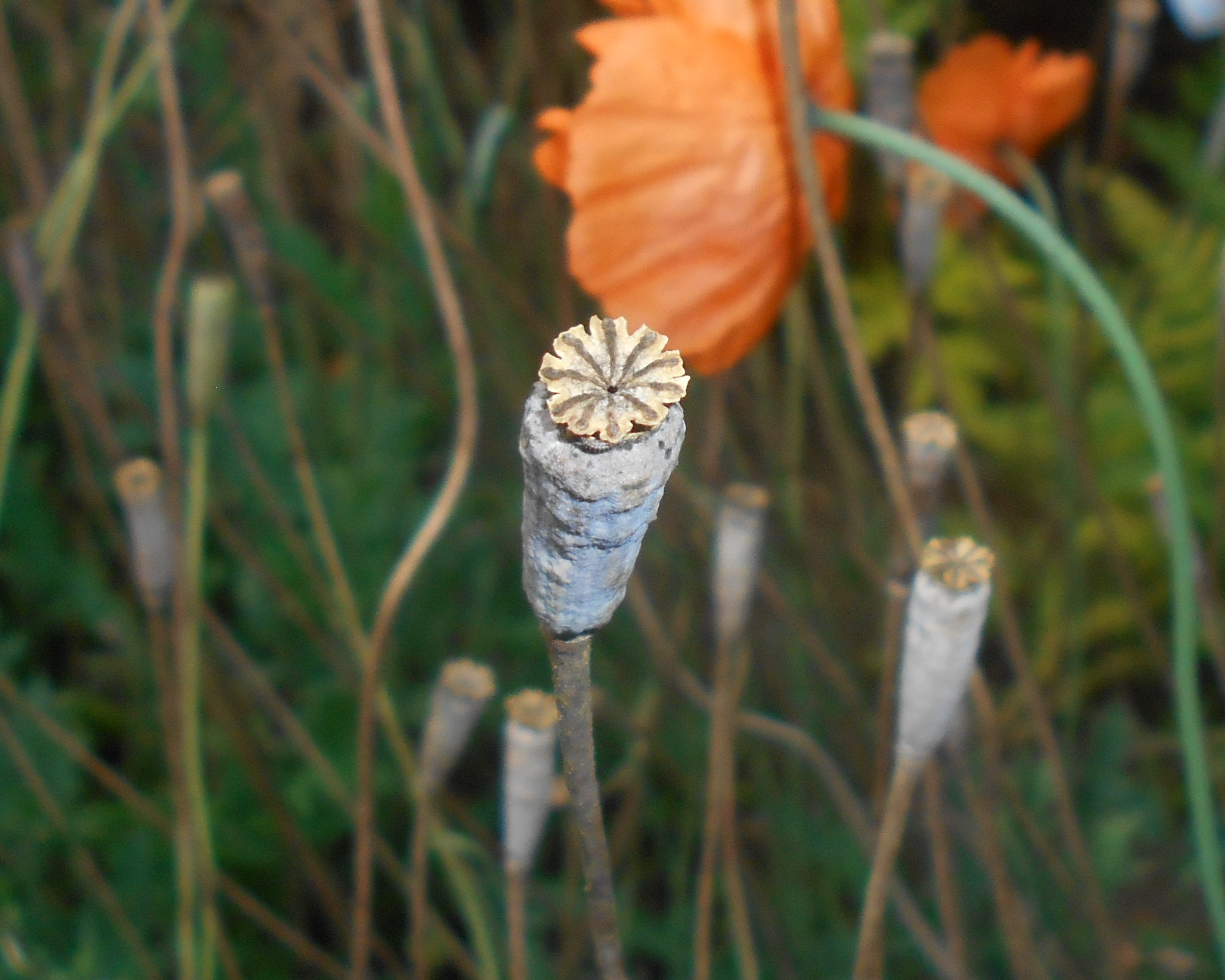
- Papaver rupifragum

Scientific classification
- Kingdom: Plantae
- Clade: Tracheophytes
- Clade: Angiosperms
- Clade: Eudicots
- Order: Ranunculales
- Family: Papaveraceae
- Genus: Papaver
- Species: P. rupifragum

Binomial name
- Papaver rupifragum Boiss. & Reut.

= Papaver rupifragum =

Species of flowering plant in the poppy family

Papaver rupifragum is a species of flowering plant in the poppy family, Papaveraceae. It is native to Morocco and Spain.
