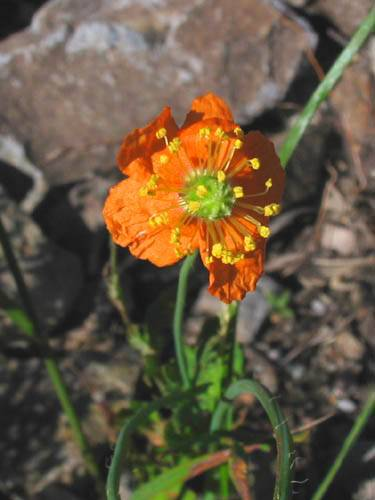

Scientific classification
- Kingdom: Plantae
- Clade: Tracheophytes
- Clade: Angiosperms
- Clade: Eudicots
- Order: Ranunculales
- Family: Papaveraceae
- Genus: Papaver
- Section: Papaver sect. Californicum; Kadereit
- Species: P. californicum

Binomial name
- Papaver californicum A.Gray

= Papaver californicum =

Species of flowering plant

Papaver californicum is a species of poppy known by the common names fire poppy and western poppy.

It is endemic to California, where it is found in Central Western California and Southwestern California. It grows in chaparral, oak woodlands, and other habitats, often in places that have recently burned.

== Description ==
Papaver californicum is an annual herb that grows a hairy to hairless stem which may exceed half a meter in height.

The flower atop the mostly naked stem usually has four petals one or two centimeters long that are orange in color with green bases. Petals of the similar wind poppy (Stylomecon heterophylla) have purple bases.

The flowers last only a few days at most. The seeds, once scattered, can lie dormant for years; smoke acts as a trigger for them to germinate.

== Taxonomy ==
Papaver californicum is the only species in the section Papaver sect. Californicum.

== See also ==
- California chaparral and woodlands
- Flora of the California chaparral and woodlands
