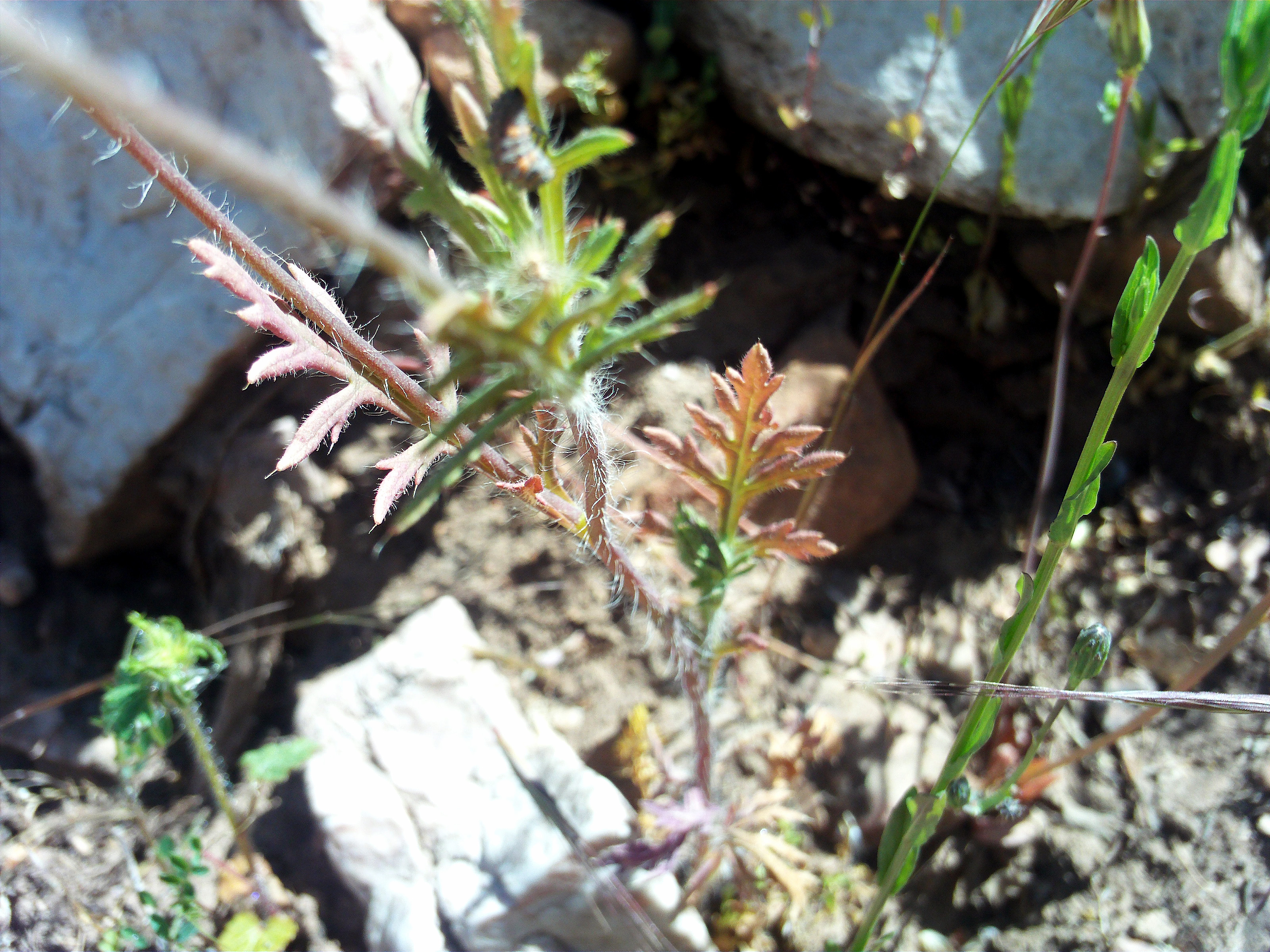

Scientific classification
- Kingdom: Plantae
- Clade: Tracheophytes
- Clade: Angiosperms
- Clade: Eudicots
- Order: Ranunculales
- Family: Papaveraceae
- Genus: Papaver
- Species: P. pinnatifidum

Binomial name
- Papaver pinnatifidum Moris

Synonyms
- Papaver rhoeas subsp. pinnatifidum

= Papaver pinnatifidum =

Species of plant

Papaver pinnatifidum is a species of plant in the family Papaveraceae.

== Sources ==
This article incorporates text from a free content work. Licensed under CC0 (license statement/permission). Text taken from Papaver pinnatifidum. Encyclopedia of Life.
