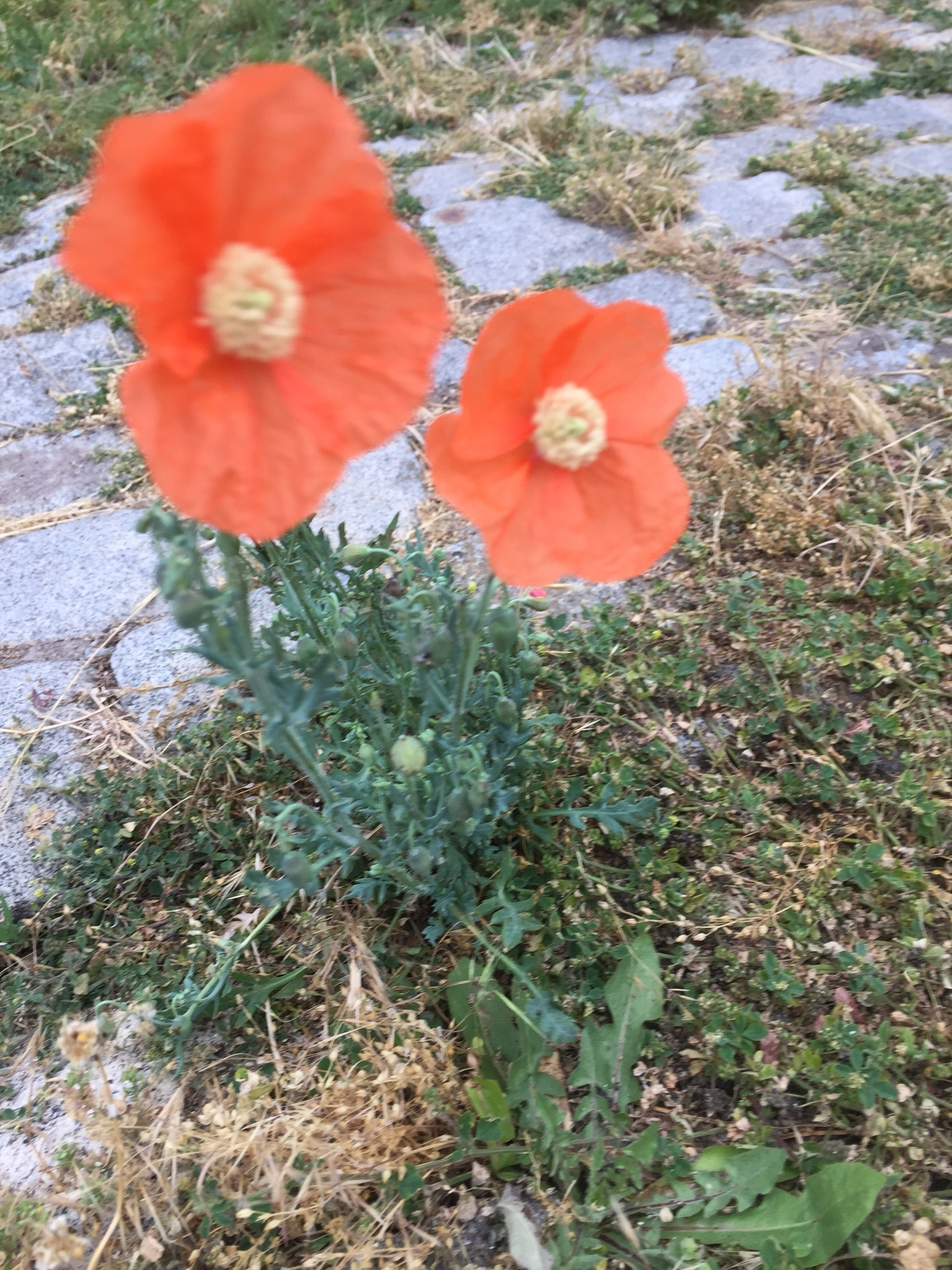
- In bloom

Scientific classification
- Kingdom: Plantae
- Clade: Embryophytes
- Clade: Tracheophytes
- Clade: Spermatophytes
- Clade: Angiosperms
- Clade: Eudicots
- Order: Ranunculales
- Family: Papaveraceae
- Genus: Papaver
- Species: P. armeniacum

Binomial name
- Papaver armeniacum (L.) DC.

Synonyms
- List: Argemone armeniaca L.; Papaver caucasicum M.Bieb.; Papaver cylindricum Cullen; Papaver floribundum Desf.; Papaver fugax Poir.; Papaver hispidum Desf. ex Elkan; Papaver hyoscyamifolium Boiss. & Hausskn.; Papaver ramosissimum Elkan; Papaver ramosissimum Fedde; Papaver roopianum Bordz. ex Sosn.; Papaver sjunicicum M.V.Agab.; Papaver tauricum Elkan; Papaver triniifolium Boiss.; Papaver urbanianum Fedde; Papaver virgatum Sm.

= Papaver armeniacum =

Species of flowering plant

Papaver armeniacum, the Armenian poppy, is a species of flowering plant in the family Papaveraceae, native to the Caucasus region. It produces the benzylisoquinoline alkaloid armepavine (6 7 methoxy 1 (4' hydroxy benzyl) 1234 tetrahydro isoquinoline).

== Subtaxa ==
The following subspecies are accepted:

- Papaver armeniacum subsp. armeniacum
- Papaver armeniacum subsp. microstigmum (Boiss.) Kadereit
- Papaver armeniacum subsp. pilgerianum (Fedde) Kadereit
