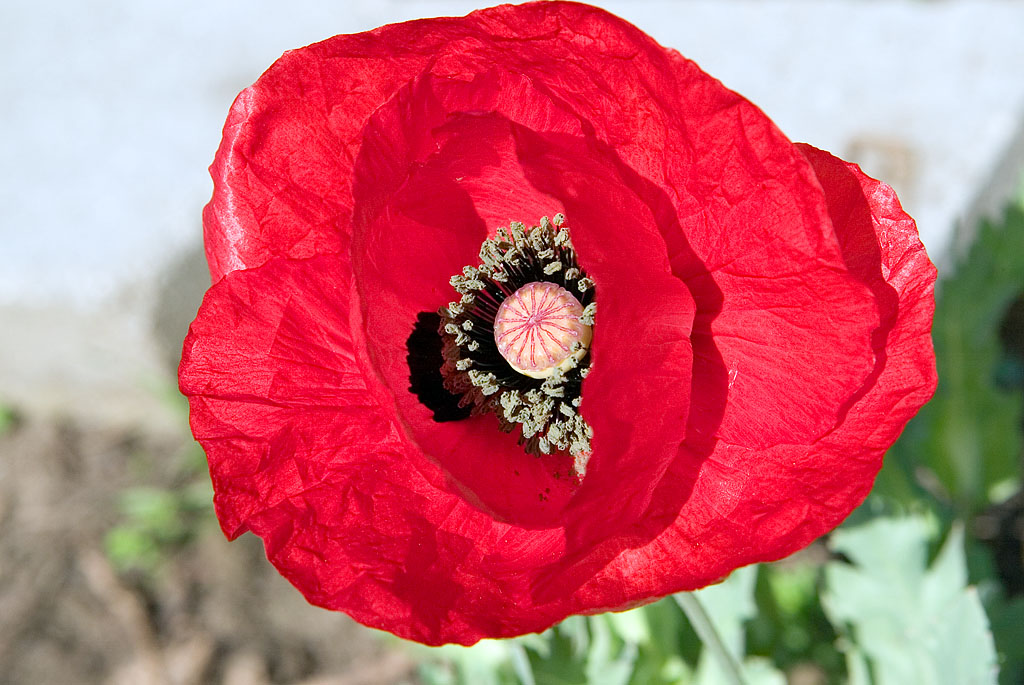

Scientific classification
- Kingdom: Plantae
- Clade: Embryophytes
- Clade: Tracheophytes
- Clade: Spermatophytes
- Clade: Angiosperms
- Clade: Eudicots
- Order: Ranunculales
- Family: Papaveraceae
- Genus: Papaver
- Species: P. glaucum

Binomial name
- Papaver glaucum Boiss. & Hausskn. ex Boiss.

= Papaver glaucum =

Species of flowering plant in the poppy family

Papaver glaucum, the tulip poppy, Turkish tulip or Turkish red poppy, is a poppy found in the region of Anatolia.

== Features ==
Growing to a height of 90 centimetres (35 in), this poppy withstands the droughts of non-Arab Middle East. The flowers are of rich red colours, with black spots in the centre. The thin petals may be crispy. The flowers bloom to a diameter of 10 cm (3.9 in). The inner petals stick up, which resembles a tulip. Looks similar to the corn rose poppy Papaver rhoeas and the Greek red poppy Papaver dubium. The distinct characteristics is the black centre which emphasises the tulip-shaped petals surrounding it.

== Growing ==
As for all poppies, best time to be sown is late autumn or early spring. The snow of winter helps "challenge" the poppies to grow good rooting systems, which results in a strong plant. Spacing for plants should be at the minimum of 30 cm (12 in) because the roots do not grow deep, and after just a few centimetres they start growing horizontally. The disadvantage of their roots is that poppies do not do well being transplanted. Caution must be taken when transplanting from peat pots. Another problem with the roots of any type of poppy is that the roots will rot if they do not have proper drainage. One should not over water, and to prevent complications one must use a spray bottle when Papaver plants are maturing.

== Chemical composition ==
The Turkish tulip contains the alkaloids morphine, codeine and thebaine. Nevertheless, its blossom and foliage are only used for ornamental purposes; the alkaloidal content of the narcotics stated are relatively low, thus uneconomic to extract opiates.
