= Papaver gorgoneum =

Conservation status
- Critically Endangered (IUCN 3.1)

Scientific classification
- Kingdom: Plantae
- Clade: Embryophytes
- Clade: Tracheophytes
- Clade: Spermatophytes
- Clade: Angiosperms
- Clade: Eudicots
- Order: Ranunculales
- Family: Papaveraceae
- Genus: Papaver
- Species: P. gorgoneum

Binomial name
- Papaver gorgoneum Cout.

Synonyms
- Papaver gorgoneum subsp. gorgoneum; Papaver gorgoneum subsp. theresias

Species of flowering plant in the poppy family

Papaver gorgoneum is a species of flowering plant of the family Papaveraceae. The species is endemic to Cape Verde. It is listed as critically endangered by the IUCN.

== Distribution and ecology ==
Papaver gorgoneum is restricted to the islands of Santo Antão, São Nicolau and Fogo. It grows in humid and sub-humid zones, mainly between 800 and 1,400 m (2,600 and 4,600 ft) elevation.
