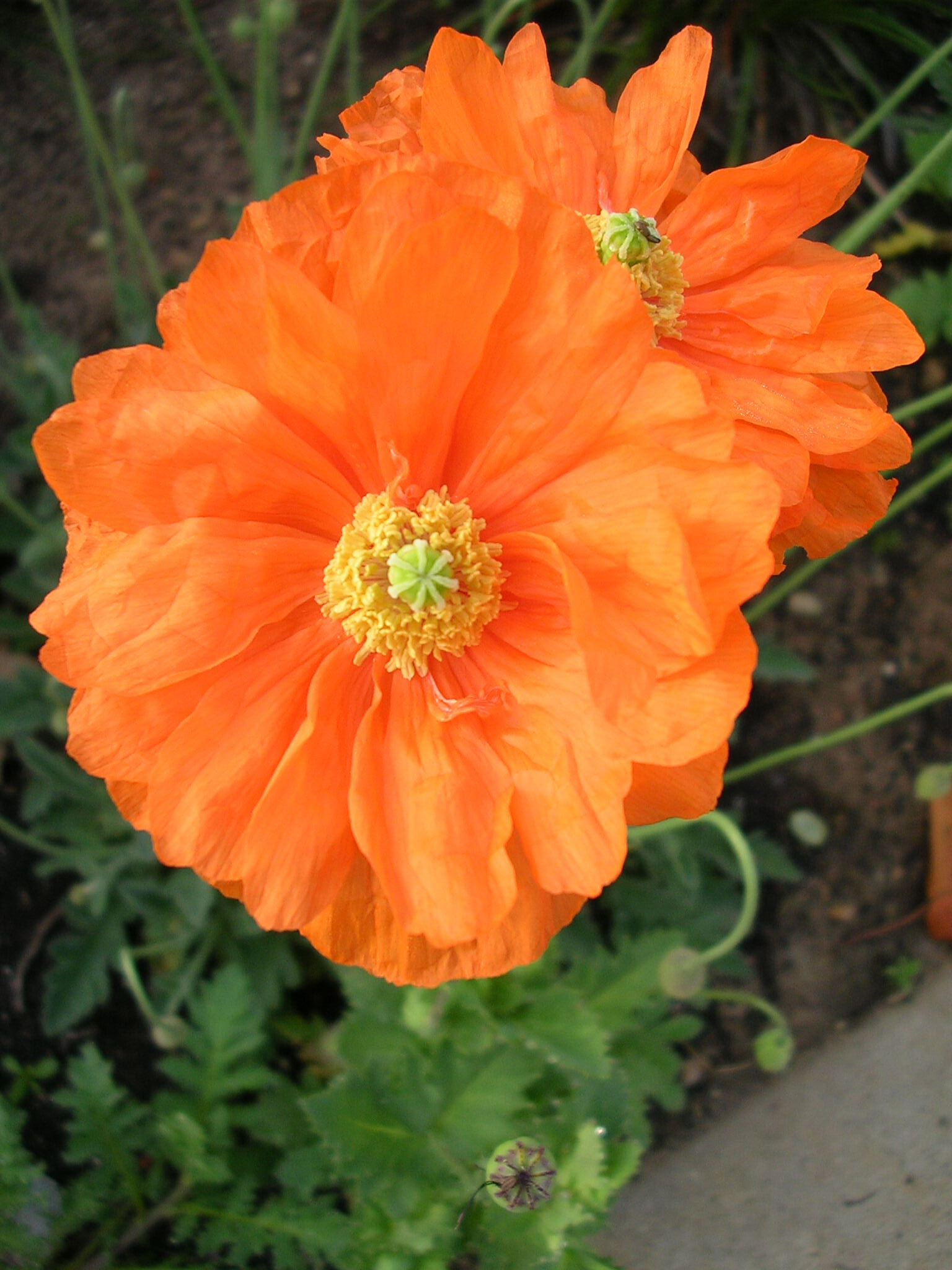
- The cultivar 'Flore Pleno'

Scientific classification
- Kingdom: Plantae
- Clade: Embryophytes
- Clade: Tracheophytes
- Clade: Spermatophytes
- Clade: Angiosperms
- Clade: Eudicots
- Order: Ranunculales
- Family: Papaveraceae
- Genus: Papaver
- Species: P. atlanticum

Binomial name
- Papaver atlanticum (Ball) Coss.

Synonyms
- Papaver rupifragum var. atlanticum Ball; Papaver rupifragum subsp. atlanticum (Ball) Maire

= Papaver atlanticum =

Species of flowering plant in the poppy family

Papaver atlanticum, also known as the Moroccan poppy, Spanish poppy, and Atlas poppy, is a species of poppy.

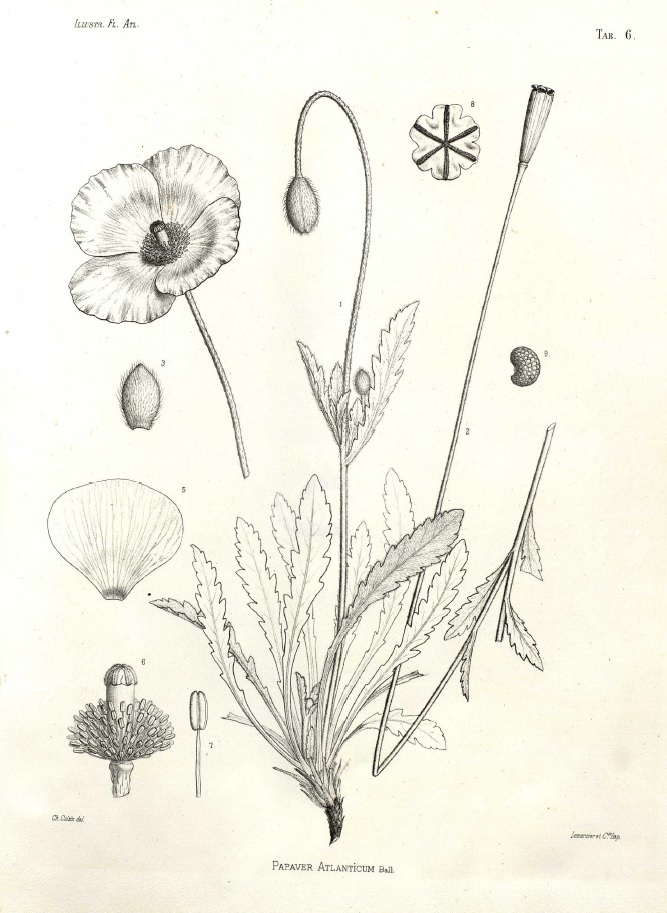
Illustration showing details of the plant.

It is a perennial plant with basal rosettes of bluish leaves and pale orange flowers on long, wiry stems.
