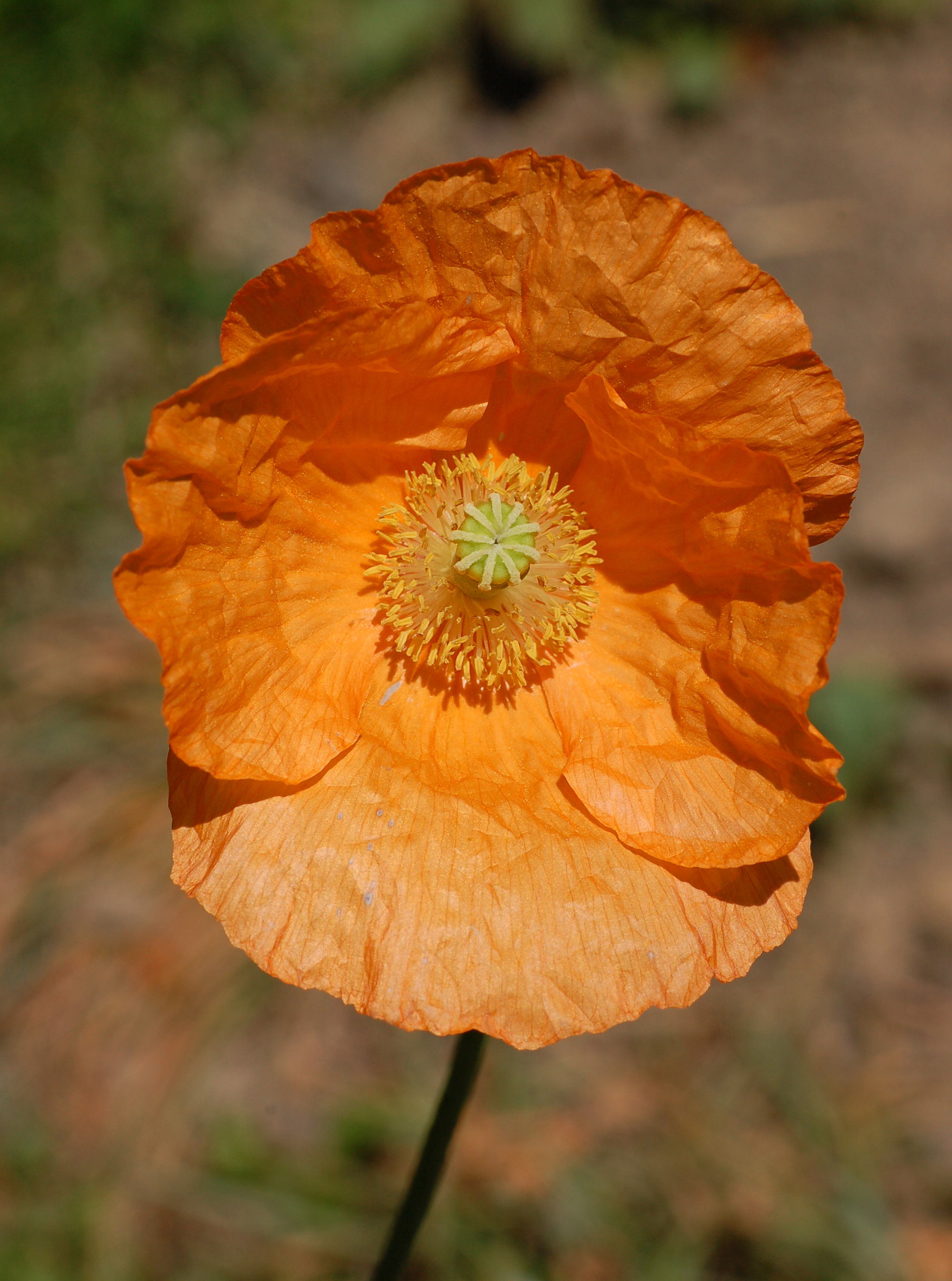

Scientific classification
- Kingdom: Plantae
- Clade: Embryophytes
- Clade: Tracheophytes
- Clade: Spermatophytes
- Clade: Angiosperms
- Clade: Eudicots
- Order: Ranunculales
- Family: Papaveraceae
- Genus: Papaver
- Species: P. lateritium

Binomial name
- Papaver lateritium K.Koch

Synonyms
- Papaver orientale var. lateritiumz (K.Koch) Kuntze

= Papaver lateritium =

Species of flowering plant in the poppy family

Papaver lateritium, the Armenian poppy, is a species of flowering plant in the family Papaveraceae. It is endemic to Armenian Highlands, Georgia and North Eastern Turkey (Black Sea mountains).

== Description ==
Mostly basal leaves, lanceolate, coarsely-toothed to pinnately-lobed, leaves and stems hairy; solitary flowers, bright brick red, sometimes apricot, 4.5–6 cm (1.8–2.4 in) across, orange-yellow anthers; sepals covered in long yellowish hairs; fruit capsule club-shaped, broadest below stigmatic disk; stoloniferous perennial; up to 50 cm (20 in); stems unbranched.
