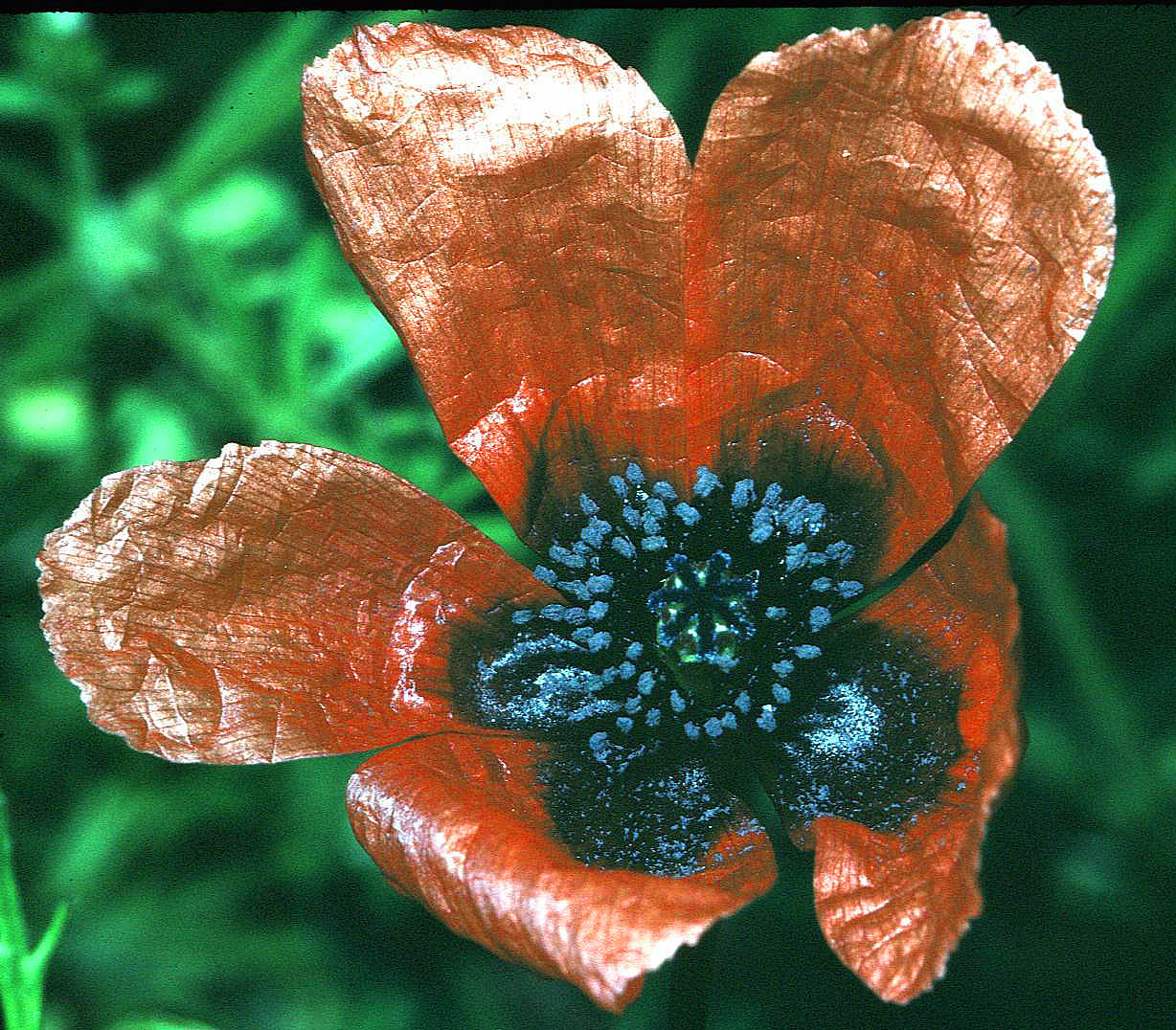

Scientific classification
- Kingdom: Plantae
- Clade: Embryophytes
- Clade: Tracheophytes
- Clade: Spermatophytes
- Clade: Angiosperms
- Clade: Eudicots
- Order: Ranunculales
- Family: Papaveraceae
- Genus: Papaver
- Species: P. arenarium

Binomial name
- Papaver arenarium M.Bieb.

Synonyms
- Papaver caucasicum J.Henning

= Papaver arenarium =

Species of flowering plant

Papaver arenarium is a species of flowering plant in the family Papaveraceae, native to the Caucasus and Caspian regions. It and Papaver bracteatum deviate from the usual morphine-producing pathway typically used by other members of Papaver, with, for example, P. arenarium producing N-demethylcodeine at the step that P. somniferum produces morphine.
