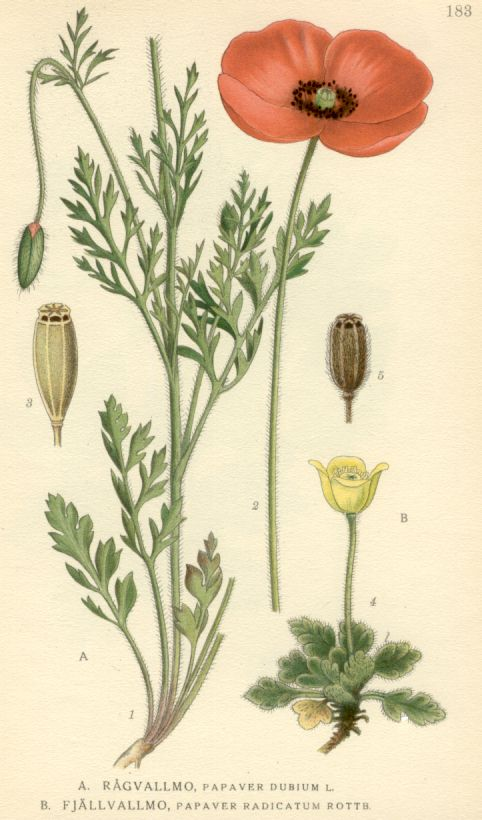
- Papaver dubium and P. radicatum

Scientific classification
- Kingdom: Plantae
- Clade: Tracheophytes
- Clade: Angiosperms
- Clade: Eudicots
- Order: Ranunculales
- Family: Papaveraceae
- Genus: Papaver
- Species: P. dubium

Binomial name
- Papaver dubium L.

= Papaver dubium =

Species of flowering plant in the poppy family

Papaver dubium is a species of poppy known by the common names long-headed poppy and blindeyes. It is an annual species which prefers sandy soils without lime. It is native to Europe, North Africa and south-western Asia and widespread as an introduction in America and elsewhere. It thrives in lowlands, and its seeds can be very long-lasting.

== Description ==
Papaver dubium is a variable annual, growing to about 60 cm (24 in) in height. It generally flowers in late spring to mid-summer. The flower is large (30–70 mm) and showy, with four petals that are lighter red than in the similar Papaver rhoeas, and most commonly without a black spot at the base. The flower stem is usually covered with coarse hairs that are closely appressed to the surface, helping to distinguish it from P. rhoeas in which the hairs are more usually patent, held at right angles to the stem. The capsules are hairless, elongated to more than twice as tall as they are wide, tapering slightly at the tip, with a stigma generally less wide than the capsule. The plant exudes white to yellowish latex when the tissues are broken. The species can form a long-lived soil seed bank that can germinate when the soil is disturbed.

A nearly black-flowering hybrid with Papaver rhoeas, known as Evelina, was bred in Italy in the late 1990s but does not appear to be available commercially.

== Uses ==
Due to its strong alkaloid flavor, it can be used to dissuade grazing by herbivores. In Turkey, its flower has traditionally been used in the management of coughs and colds. Chemicals which are extracted from the species include diethyl ether, chloroform, acetone, ethanol extract, and petroleum ether. Unlike other species of Papaver, in particular Papaver somniferum, it is not used as a spice, nor in the production of opiates.

== Gallery ==
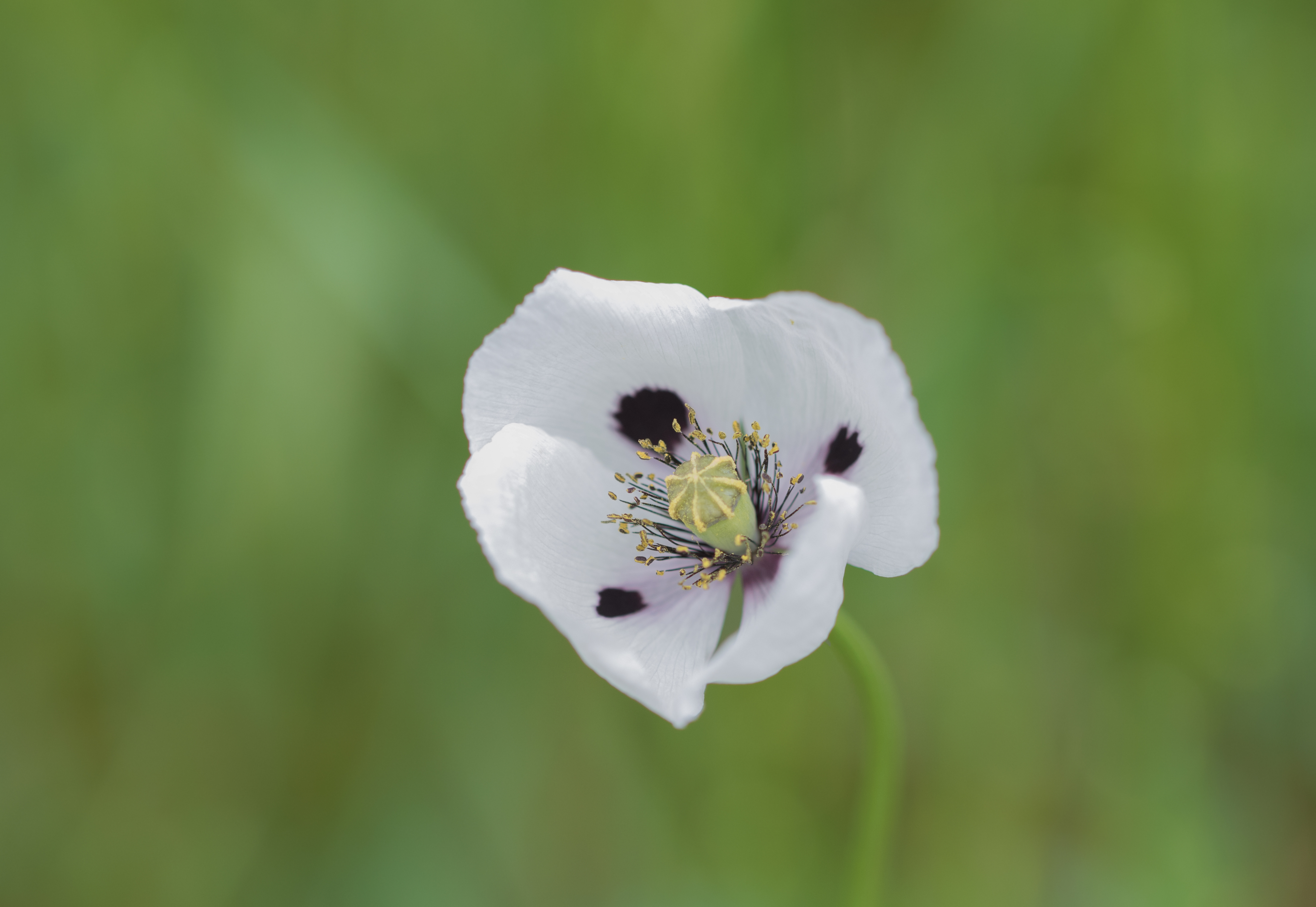
White-flower variety

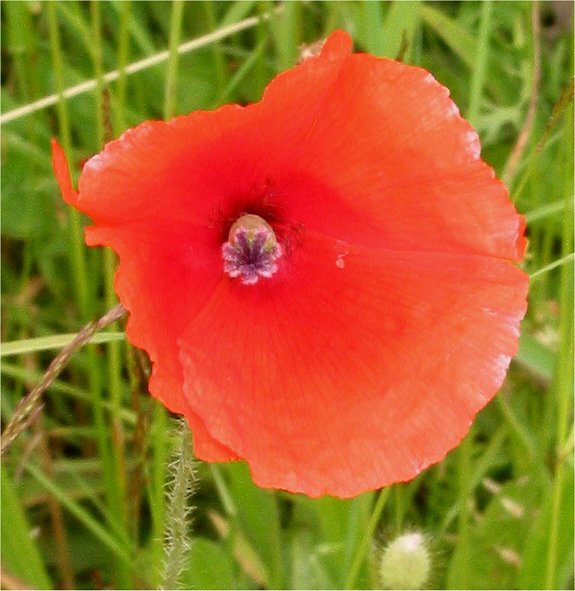
Flower

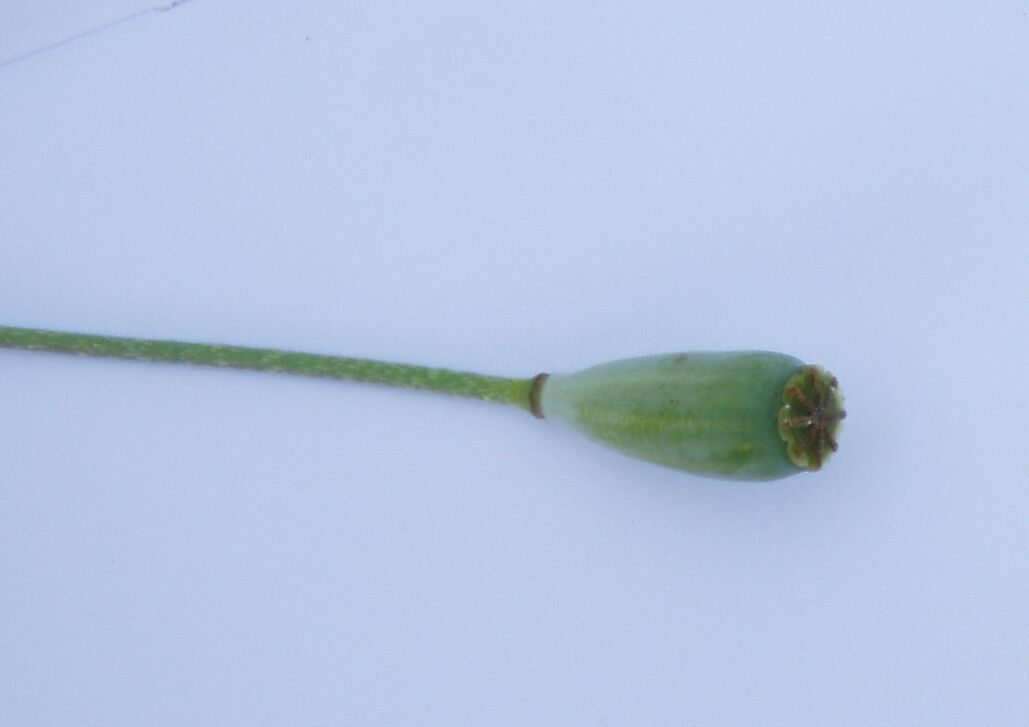
Fruit

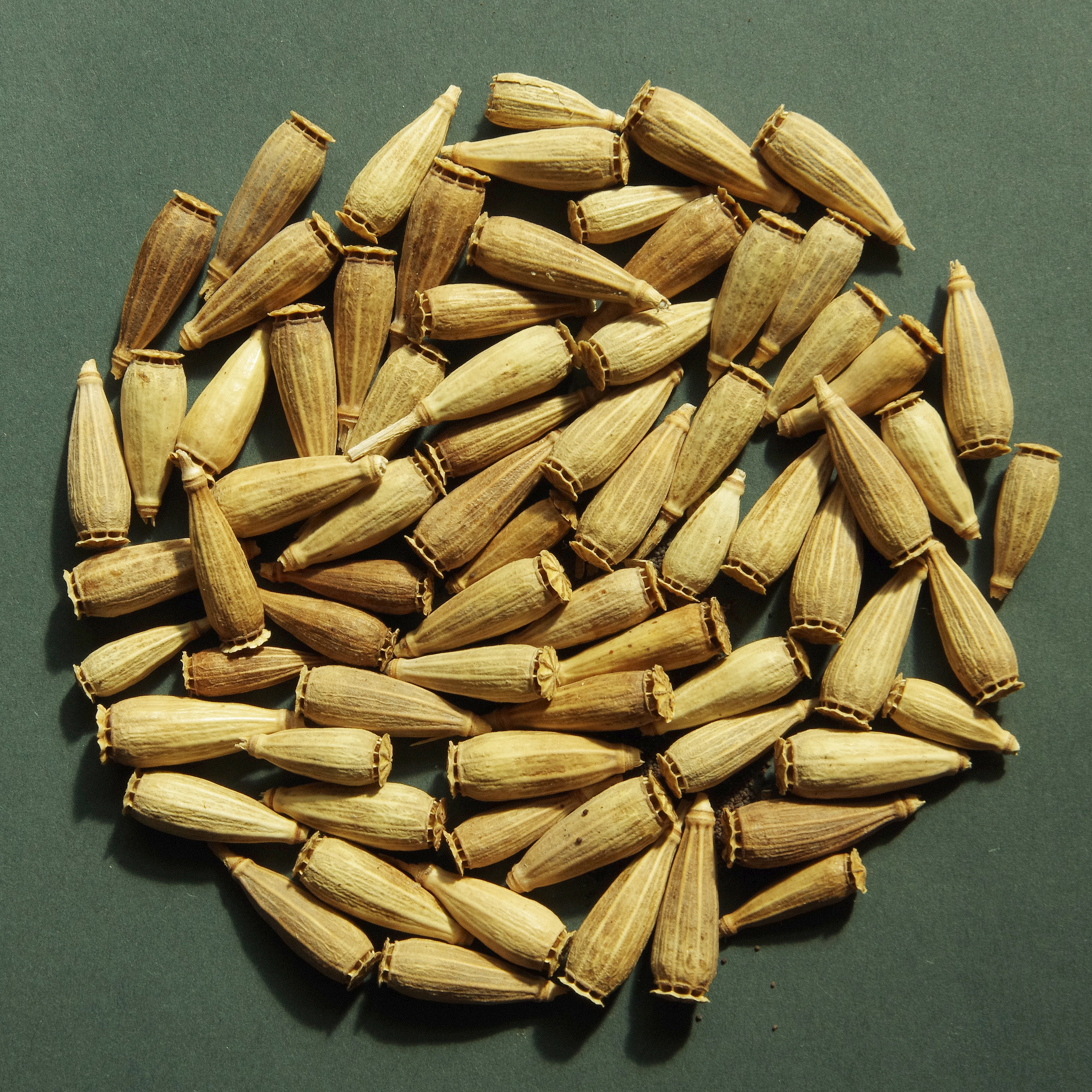
Capsules
