= Coronado Islands =

Group of islands near Baja California, Mexico

Native name: Islas Coronado
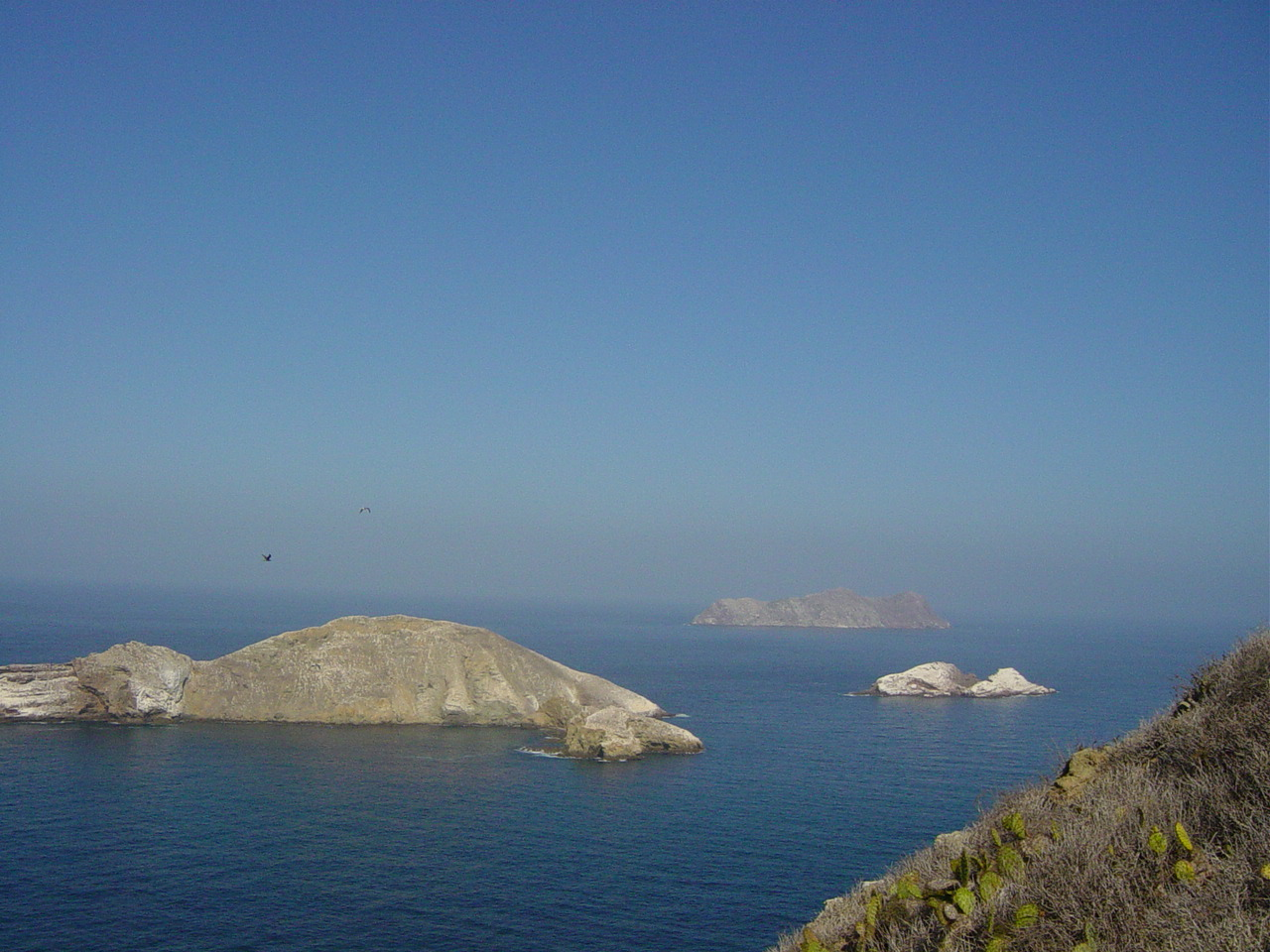
- North Coronado (right background), Central Coronado (left midground), and Pile of Sugar (right midground) viewed from South Coronado (foreground)

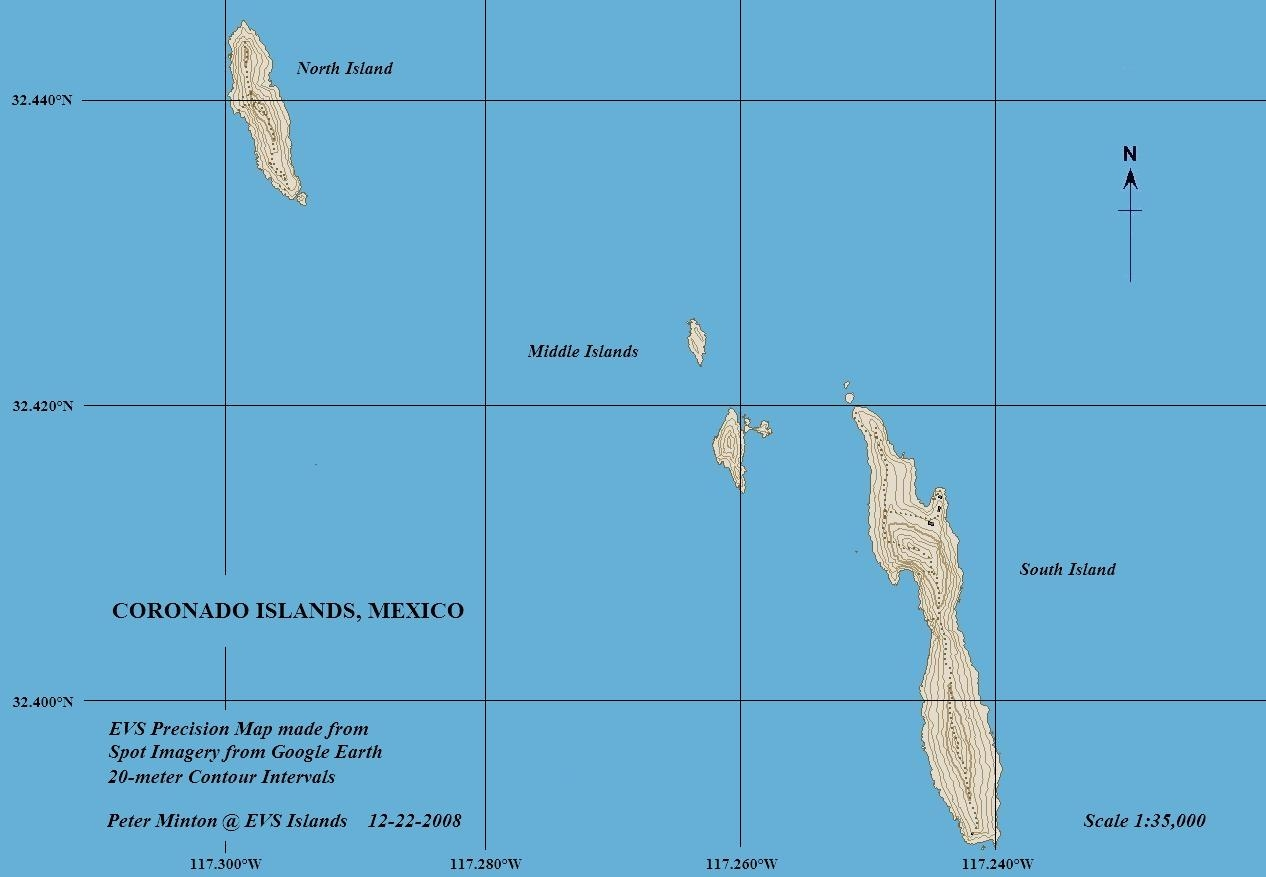
- A map of the four Coronado Islands

- Location within Baja California

Geography
- Location: Southern California Bight
- Coordinates: 32°25.05′N 117°15.63′W
- Major islands: 4

Administration
- Mexico
- State: Baja California
- Municipality: Tijuana Municipality

The Coronado Islands (Islas Coronado or Islas Coronados; English: Islands of the Coronation(s); Kumeyaay: Mat hasil ewik kakap) are a group of islands located 13 km (8 mi) off the northwest coast of the Mexican state of Baja California. Battered by the wind and waves, the rocky islands are mostly uninhabited except for a small military detachment and a lighthouse keeper. Despite their barren appearance, they serve as a refuge for seabirds and support a sizable number of plants, including 6 endemic taxa found only on the islands. The waters around the islands support a considerable amount of diverse marine life.

Used extensively and intermittently by the indigenous peoples for thousands of years, the first European explorers sighted them in 1542. Centuries later, they served as weekend getaway locations, secret gambling spots, and smuggling sites until the Mexican Navy clamped down on trespassing. The tied island city of Coronado, California, 27 km (17 mi) to the north, was named in honor of the islands after an 1886 naming competition. During World War II, the islands were utilized in joint training exercises between Mexico and the United States, but gained notoriety when future founder of Scientology, L. Ron Hubbard, shelled the inhabited island, earning the ire of the Mexican government. Today, the islands are a Mexican wildlife refuge; visitors may anchor, scuba, and snorkel, but setting foot on the islands is prohibited without special permission from the government.

== Geography ==
The Coronado Islands are located within the central portion of the Southern California Bight, on the continental margin within Mexico's exclusive economic zone. The islands are exposed continental blocks, produced by the shear zone of the Pacific and North American plates. To the west, underwater cliffs border a deep channel over 1,100 m (3,600 ft) in depth. The largest and closest island, South Coronado, is located approximately 13 km (8 mi) off the Mexican mainland and 12 km (7 mi) south of the maritime border with the United States. The islands are under the jurisdiction of Mexico and Tijuana Municipality in the state of Baja California.

The archipelago is composed of four main islands spread out over 8 km (5 mi).

- Coronado Norte (North Coronado or North Island) is located at 32°26′N 117°18′W and has a surface area of 48 ha (120 acres). It has no bay but boats can anchor on a jetty on the eastern side. It is large enough to support numerous microhabitats for plants, and has a climate similar to southern Point Loma.
- Pilón de Azúcar (Pile of Sugar or Middle Rock) is located at 32°25′N 117°16′W and covers 7 ha (17 acres). The island has a rocky guano-washed hill on the southern side, and a smaller ridge on the north side, separated by a amphitheater-shaped depression between them. The island is composed of barren, infertile sandstone, with little vegetation. A few succulent plants, such as Opuntia spp. and Dudleya spp. are present on the southern hill, although the soil tends to slough off the slopes. In the basin, straddling both peaks, herbaceous and woody plants occur in the more soil-rich depression.
- Coronado Centro (Central Coronado or Middle Island) is located at 32°25′N 117°16′W and covers 14 ha (35 acres). This island forms a steep-hill with a peninsula-like structure on the northeast side, which creates a protected cove known as Moonlight Cove. This island is extensively weathered and beaten, with unstable material giving way in handful to slope-sized masses. The unstable and barren nature of this island is likely a result of the heavy use by breeding and roosting sea birds combined with unstable substrates. The only abundant plant community occurs on the southwest, windward side of the island.
- Coronado Sur (South Coronado or South Island) is located at 32°25′N 117°15′W, and covers 183 ha (450 acres). It is 3.2 km (2.0 mi) long and 800 m (2,600 ft) wide. It has the only bay of the islands, called Puerto Cueva Cove, located one quarter the way down on the east side. The island has two main peaks, Middle Peak, located about one-third the way down the island with an elevation of about 180 m (590 ft), and South Peak, approximately 160 m (520 ft) high. On the west side there is a cove known as Seal Cove. There are roughly a half dozen structures above Puerto Cueva, and two navigational lights at the northern and southern ends of the island.
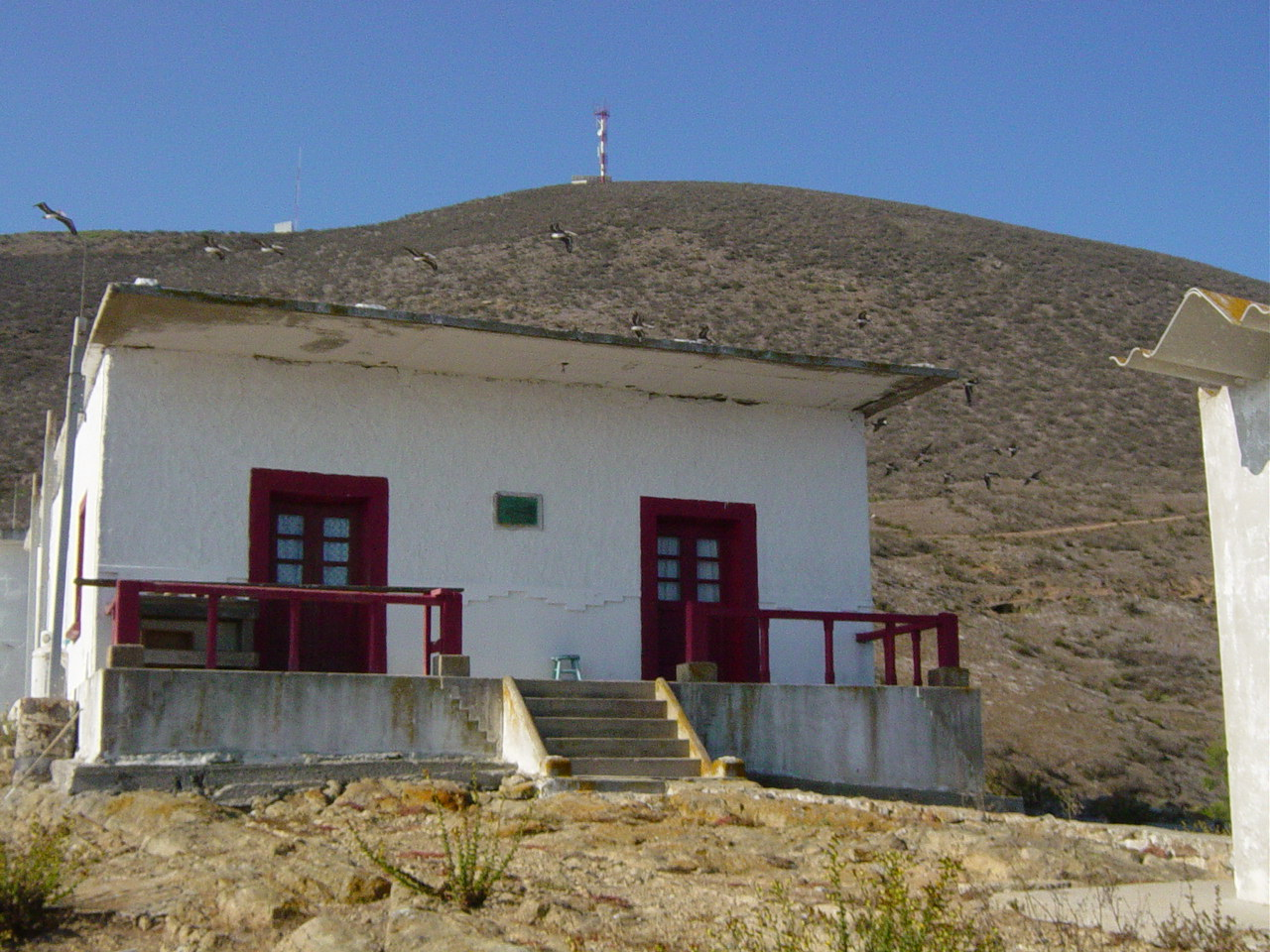
  South Island contains some of the only structures for the few inhabitants on the islands

== History ==
=== Indigenous peoples and Spanish exploration ===
The islands had been occupied by humans for over 1,000 years. As the islands lack any fresh water, permanent settlements would have not been feasible in the past. However, the islands were frequently visited by the local indigenous peoples (such as the Kumeyaay), who likely set up small and temporary encampments, possibly for retreats or other spiritual/sacred practices; ancient artifacts have been collected from both islands. North Island has artifacts that include teshoa flakes, and a midden on the saddle of the island. A small cave, dubbed Pirate's Cave, was reported to have had remains of ceramics. On South Island, numerous other middens exist. The artifacts may be from the La Jolla complex of peoples. Anthropologist J.P Harrington recorded the Luiseño word for the islands as "mexéelam". The Kumeyaay called the islands mat hasil ewik kakap.

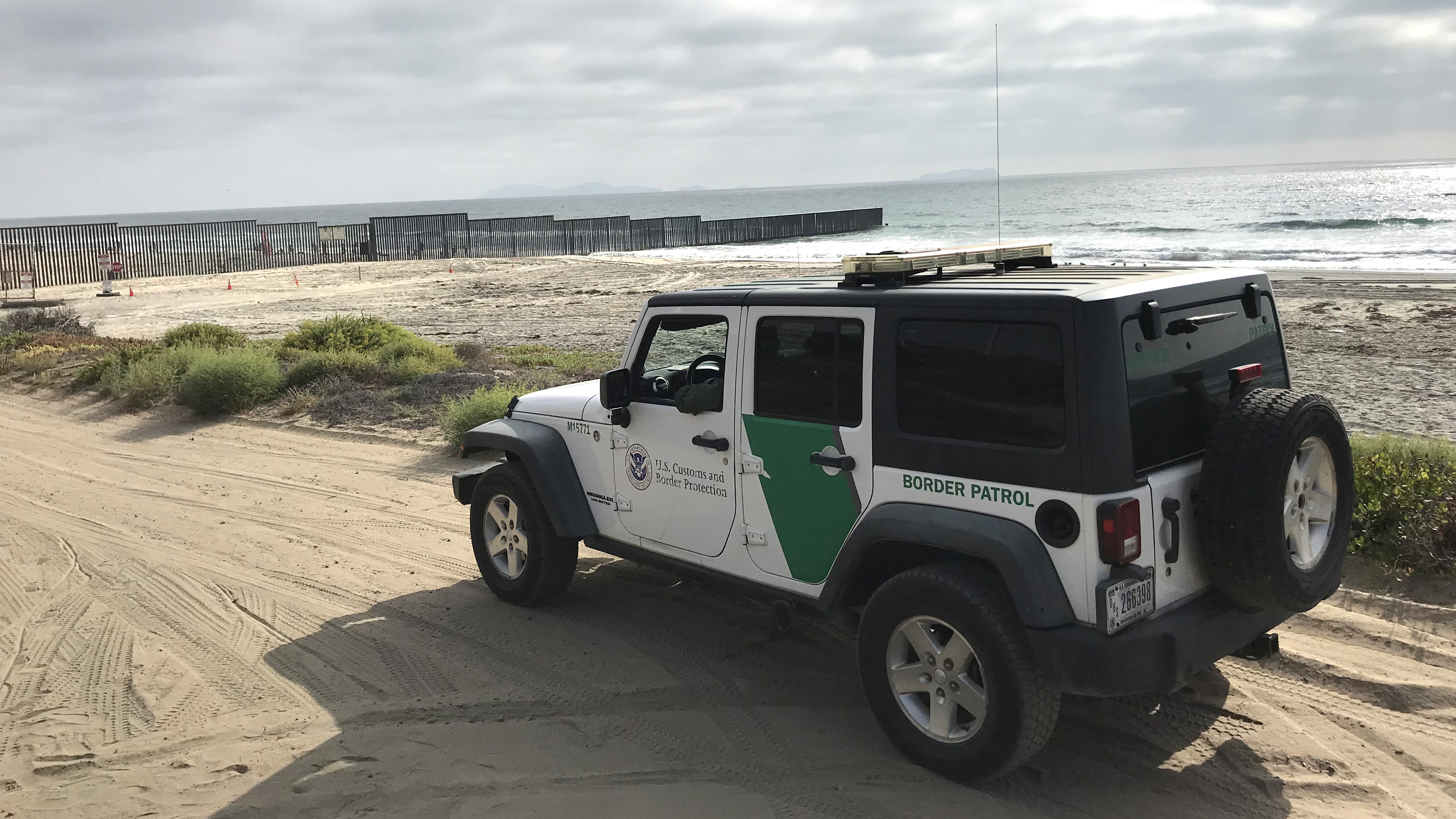
At the US-Mexico border. The visible islands are Islas Coronados

Subsequent archaeological expeditions have corroborated reports of ceramic artifacts on the islands, with ceramic fragments found also on South Island. These ceramic fragments appear to have been fired in an open oven, and were likely used as cooking pots. Analysis of the artifacts suggests their production techniques are consistent with those of Yuman ceramic manufacture. Radiocarbon dating of abalone shells within the vicinity of the ceramic artifacts suggest that site was occupied intermittently from at least 1390 to 820 calibrated years BP.

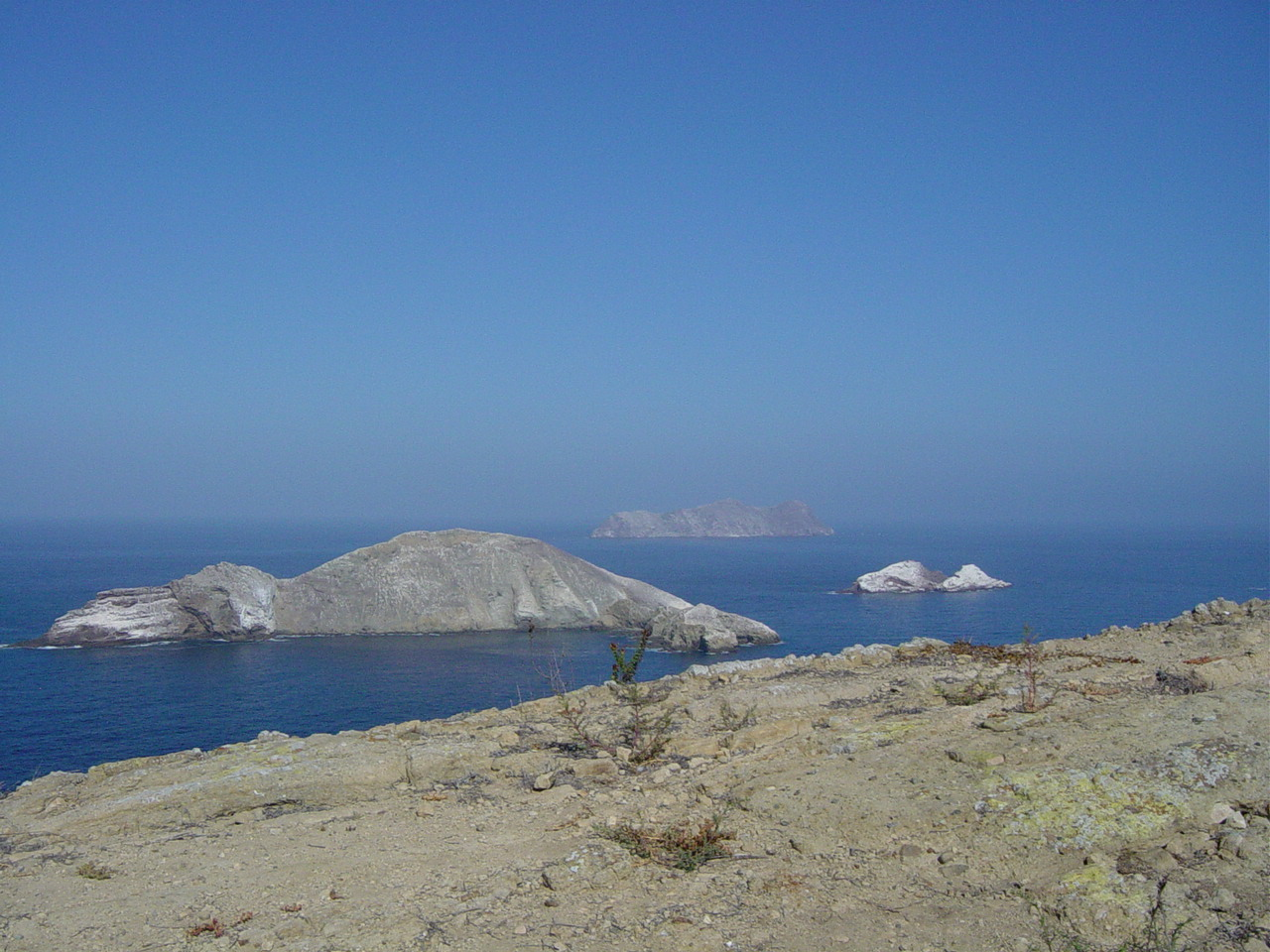
The archipelago was first noted by European explorers as "desert islands"

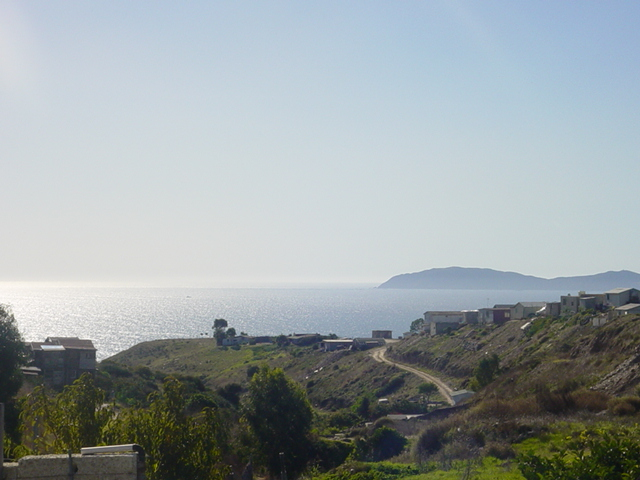
The islands visible from the Mexican mainland

In 1542, Portuguese explorer (later naturalized Castilian) Juan Rodríguez Cabrillo was the first European to notice the islands, describing them as Las Islas Desiertas (the desert islands) due to their barren lack of soil. In 1602 the priest for Sebastián Vizcaíno's expedition, Father Antonio de la Ascención, called them Los Cuatro Coronados (the four crowned ones) to honor the four brothers who died for their Christian faith. They are also known by a number of other names, with later fisherman, upon seeing floating coffins, ghostly faces and shrouded bodies amid the rocks dubbing them Old Stone Face, The Sarcophagi, Dead Man's Island, and Corpus Christi. They have also been referred to as the Sentinels of San Diego Bay.

=== Commercial ventures ===
Starting in the 1860s, advertisements for day trips to the islands began making appearances in local newspapers. At the same time, commercial fishing ventures also started, focusing mostly on rock cod.

In 1872, the Mexican Navy began visiting the islands to prevent trespassing and reduce the damage from human impact, although business ventures still proceeded regardless. That same year, building stone of high quality was discovered on North Island. Colonel Manuel Ferrer and Tore Fidel Pujal, the editor of the newspaper La Baja California, secured the North Island in 1873, planning to use the stone. The last newspaper report of this venture was in 1882. At one point, the islands were used as a way station in the smuggling of Chinese immigrants into California. This ended after a group of Chinese were found starving and abandoned on the island.

In the 1920s and 1930s, during prohibition, the cove on the northeast side of South Coronado Island was used as a meeting place for alcohol smugglers. Since it was the time before radar, and as foggy nights are common on the islands, the large number of boats frequently resulted in collisions. There was so much traffic that a famous casino, an elaborately constructed two-story building known as the Coronado Islands Yacht Club, flourished well into the Depression. The casino was forced to change trajectory after the Mexican government made gambling illegal only eighteen months after it opened, re-opening the next year as a weekend getaway hotel. It later served as a garrison for Mexican soldiers who had their provisions shipped from the mainland. The structure was ultimately destroyed in the high winds and waves of a storm in 1988. Only the stone foundation remains though the name Smugglers Cove, and more rarely Casino Cove, adorn modern maps.

Around the same time that other boats visited the islands to escape prohibition, during the 1930s, the Star and Crescent Company also made frequent boat excursions to the islands. These were suspended for some time, before briefly starting back again in 1958, with the steamer Silver Gate towing a glass bottom boat to the cove on South Coronado.

=== World War II and after ===
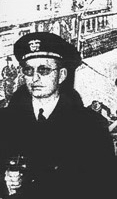
L. Ron Hubbard, future founder of Scientology, bombarded South Island in 1943, despite it being inhabited by Mexican soldiers

In 1942, Mexico entered the Second World War. Shortly after, the islands were utilized by Mexico and the United States as a site for military exercises. The island was garrisoned by a small detachment of the Mexican Navy, and foxholes were excavated on South Island during this period.

In May 1943 the U.S. Navy's USS PC-815, commanded by L. Ron Hubbard, the future founder of Scientology, conducted unauthorized gunnery exercises involving the shelling of the Coronado Islands, in the belief they were uninhabited and belonged to the United States. Unfortunately for Hubbard, the islands belonged to Mexico and were occupied by the Mexican Navy. The Mexican government complained and Hubbard was relieved of command.

In October 1944, Lieutenant Robert D. Cullinane, flying a Consolidated PB2Y-3 Coronado, BuNo 7051 of the VPB-13 patrol bombing squadron, perished along with the 12 members of his crew in a crash on South Coronado. Wreckage belonging to the aircraft is located on the western-facing slope of South Island.

The Coronado Islands are under the jurisdiction of the municipality of Tijuana, Baja California, as ruled in the books of the Baja Californian Government, published on December 20, 1959. Today, the only inhabitants of the island are Mexican Navy personnel and a lighthouse keeper on South Island. As the islands are a natural protected area, access to the islands is restricted to governmental personnel and permitted scientists.

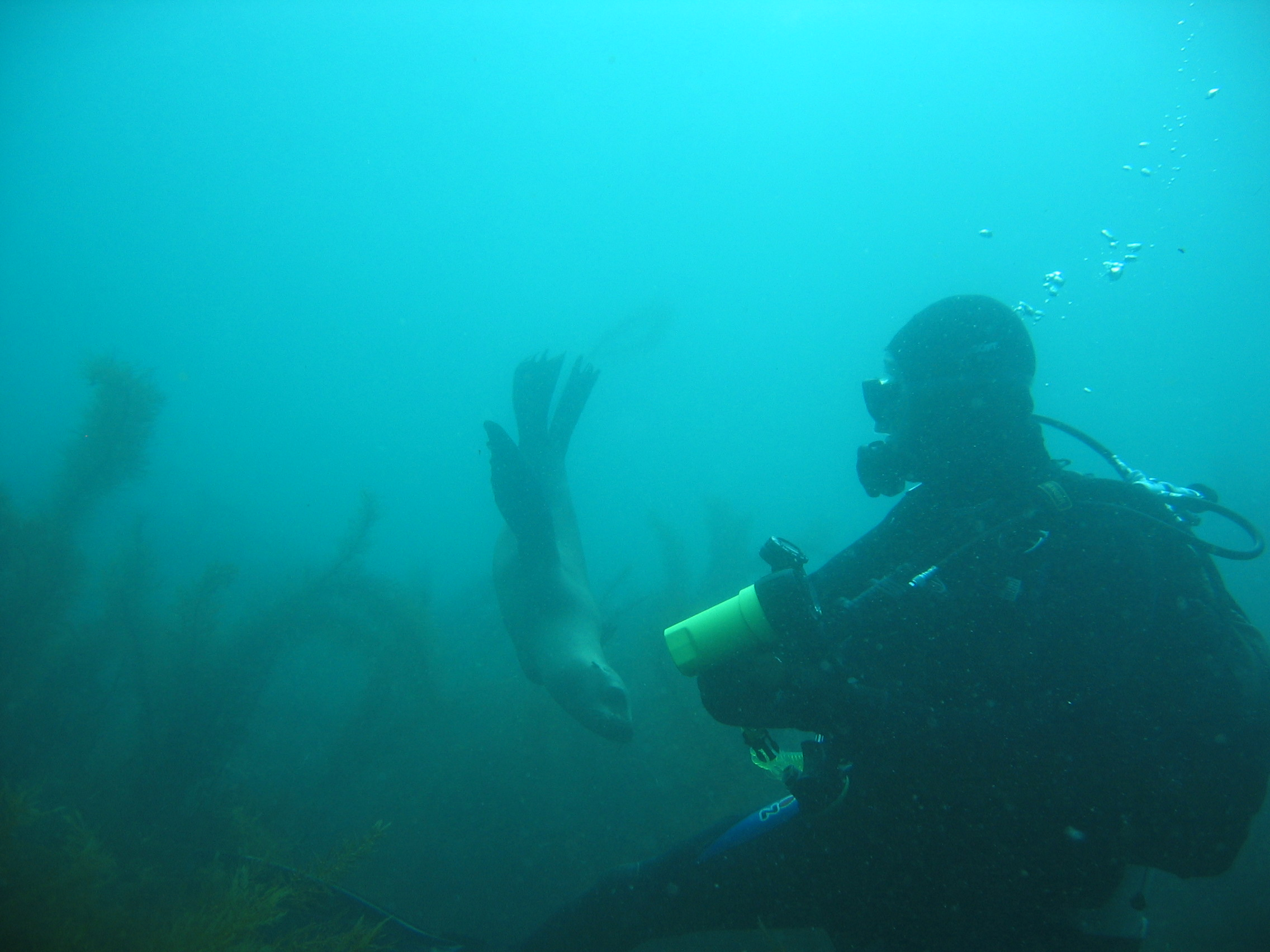
Although landing on the islands is not permitted, divers, fishermen and tourists are free to visit the waters around them

Although landing on the islands is prohibited, the waters around them are still a frequent destination for divers, snorkelers and fishermen.

== Ecology ==
=== Flora ===
==== Plant communities ====
The topography, soil, and human impact each have effects on the vegetation of the islands, creating varying characteristics on each island. However, the vegetation of the Coronado Islands is mostly dominated by maritime succulent scrub, a plant community within the sage scrub ecosystem of North America, characterized a predominance of succulent plants and a dependence on ocean fog as a consistent source of moisture. It forms a transitional zone between the Mediterranean ecosystems of the California Floristic Province and the subtropical deserts of western North America. It includes a number of species characteristic of the coastal sage scrub, but is complemented by a wide assemblage of endemic species, giving it the greatest species richness of any of the sage scrub communities. Some taxa representative of this environment include succulents such as liveforevers (Dudleya spp.), and cacti like the coastal cholla (Cylindropuntia prolifera), coastal prickly pear (Opuntia littoralis) and the golden-spined cereus (Bergerocactus emoryi).

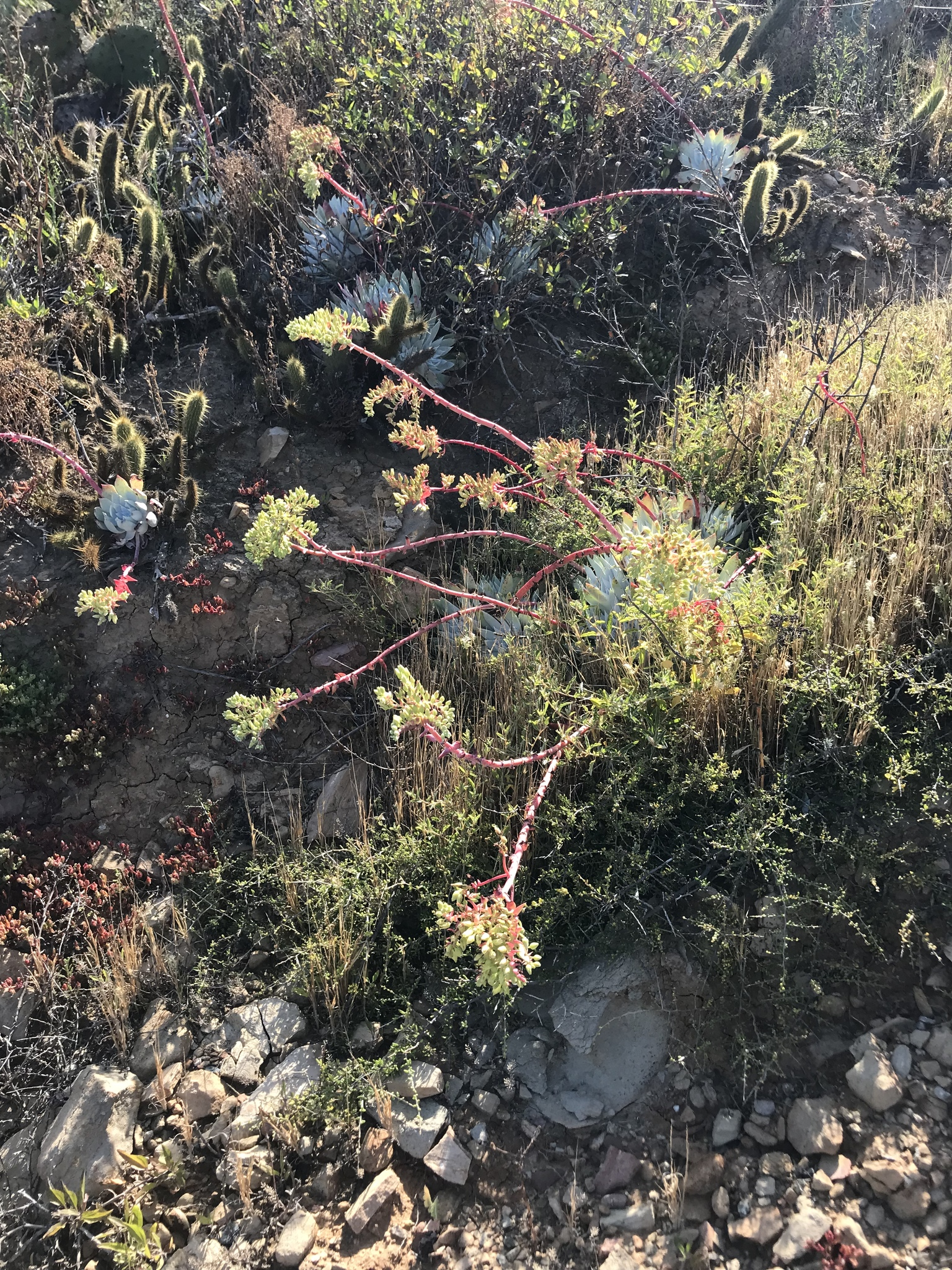
The endemic Dudleya candida in flower, with Bergerocactus emoryi visible around it

This habitat is most typical of northwestern Baja California, ranging from the town of San Vicente to the vicinity of Punta San Carlos, a coastal swathe of about 175 kilometres (109 mi). It occurs farther north, but in a more fragmented pattern, occupying the fringe coastal bluffs and mesas up to the Mexico–United States border and sparsely north to Torrey Pines State Natural Reserve in San Diego County, California. It is also present on the other offshore islands of the region, including Isla San Martin and Todos Santos Island, but also portions of San Clemente and Santa Catalina Island in the southern Channel Islands of California.

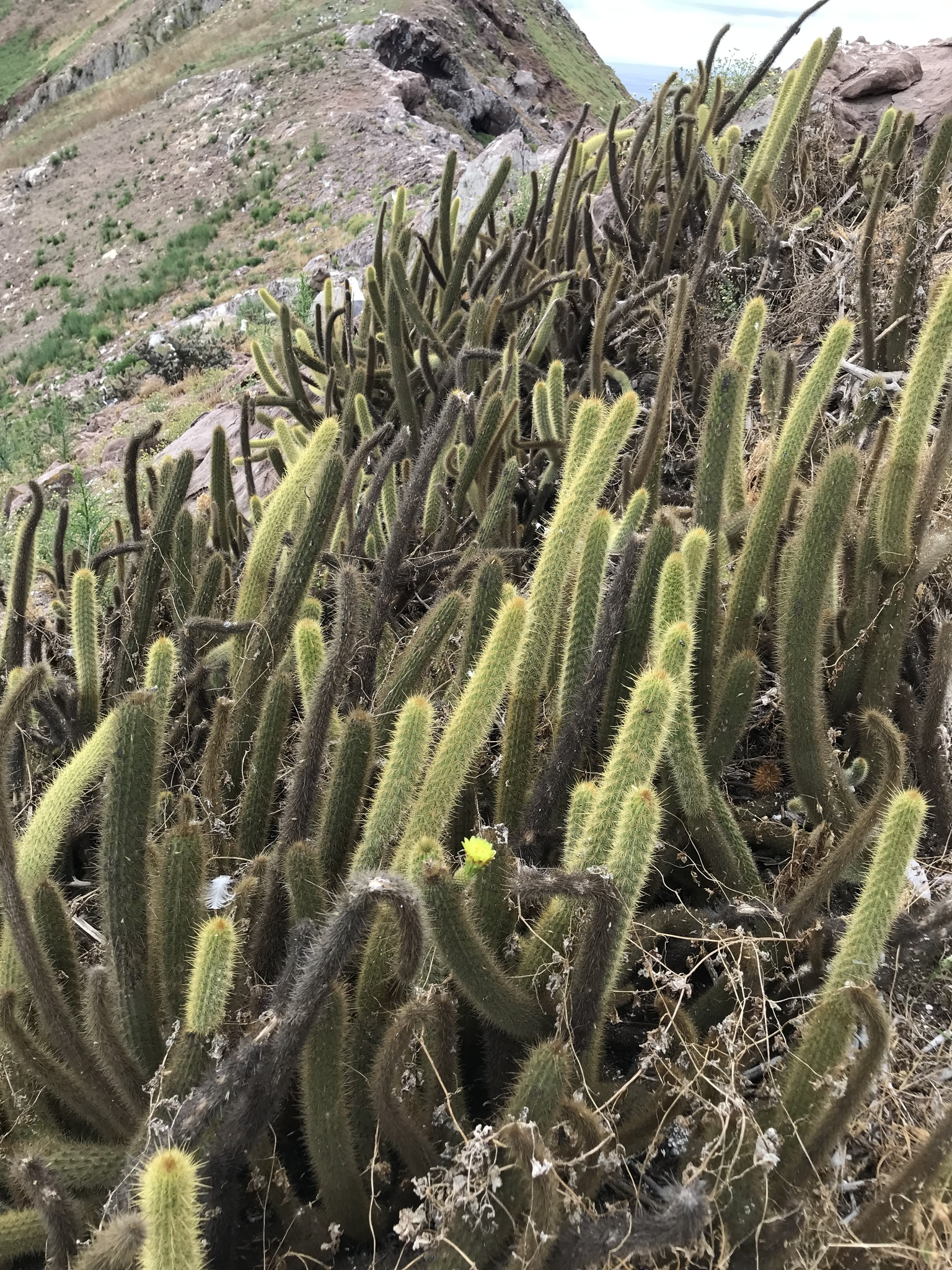
Bergerocactus emoryi on a ridge on the islands

On South Island the area at the extreme northern end, near the lighthouse, has diverging vegetation. Here, the vegetation takes on an aspect of coastal sage scrub. Coastal sage scrub consists of low-growing, aromatic and more herbaceous plants with soft, drought-deciduous leaves as opposed to those of the succulent scrub. The dominant plants found in this area include California sagebrush (Artemisia californica), lemonade berry (Rhus integrifolia), California buckwheat (Eriogonum fasciculatum) and toyon (Heteromeles arbutifolia). This area is the only location on South Island where Eriogonum fasciculatum, Heteromeles arbutifolia, and broom baccharis (Baccharis sarothroides) grow. Also present on the north end, but on the east slope, is the endemic Galium coronadoense and Galium angustifolium. Non-native plants such as crystalline ice plant (Mesembryanthemum crystallinum) are present in disturbed areas, especially along trails. Interestingly, this non-native plant provides shelter for the commonly-occurring endemic rattlesnake.

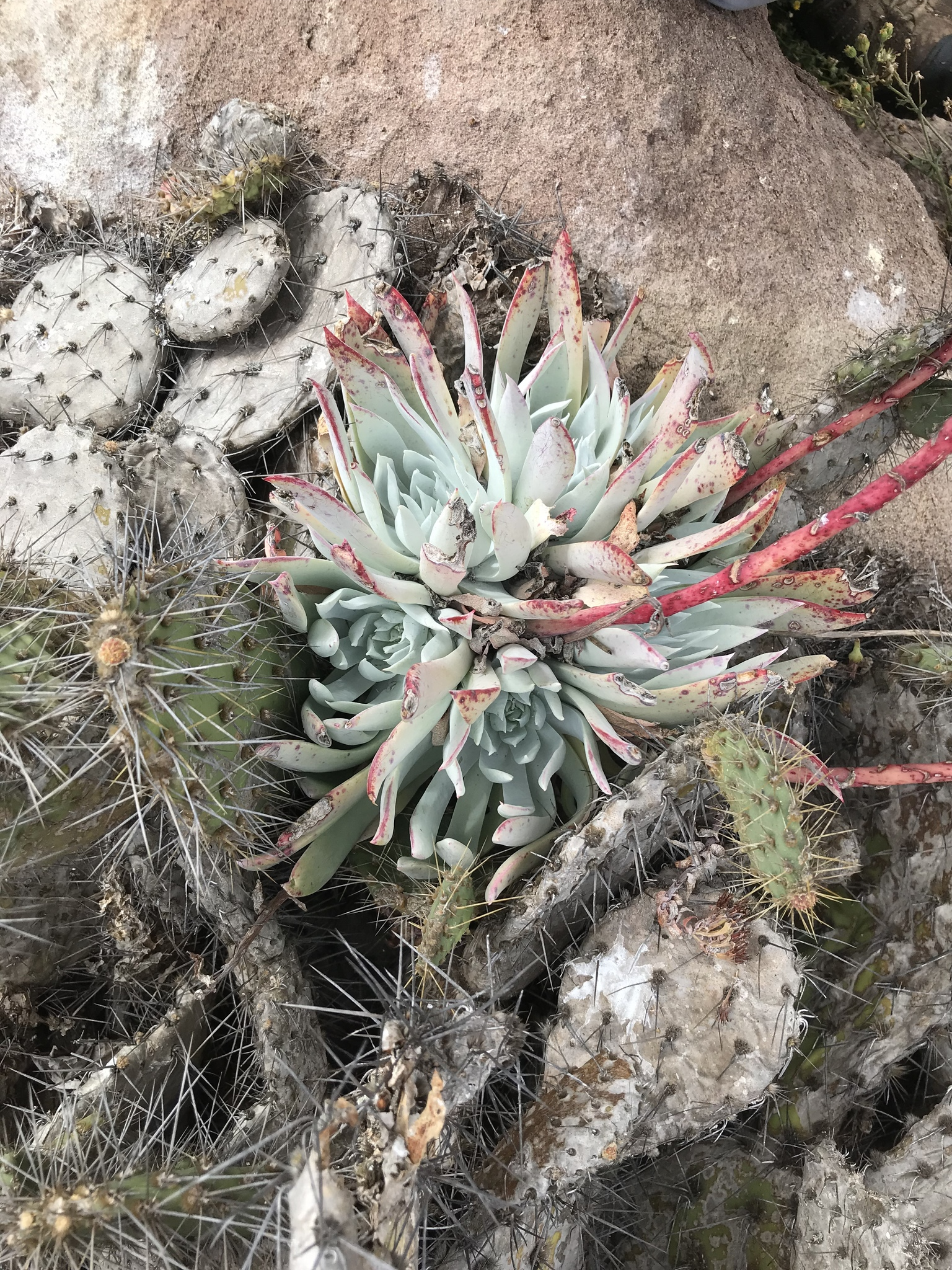
Dudleya candida on Coronado Norte

==== Taxa ====
Despite the barren, rocky appearance of the islands, they support a large number of plant species. The following is a comprehensive, but not complete, list of the native plants present on the islands.

Anacardiaceae

- Rhus integrifolia

Apiaceae

- Apiastrum angustifolium
- Daucus pusillus

Asteraceae

- Amblyopappus pusillus
- Artemisia californica
- Baccharis sarothroides
- Chaenactis glabriuscula var. glabriuscula
- Encelia californica
- Eriophyllum confertiflorum
- Hazardia berberidis
- Hazardia orcuttii
- Lasthenia coronaria
- Lasthenia gracilis
- Leptosyne maritima
- Logfia filaginoides
- Malacothrix foliosa
- Malacothrix insularis
- Malacothrix similis
- Perityle emoryi
- Pseudognaphalium biolettii
- Pseudognaphalium microcephalum
- Pseudognaphalium ramosissimum
- Rafinesquia californica
- Stephanomeria diegensis
- Uropappus lindleyi

Boraginaceae

- Cryptantha intermedia
  - var. intermedia
  - var. johnstonii
- Cryptantha maritima var. maritima

Brassicaceae

- Descurainia pinnata
  - var. brachycarpa
  - var. glabra
- Lepidium oblongum var. insulare

Cactaceae

- Bergerocactus emoryi
- Cylindropuntia prolifera
- Mammillaria dioica
- Opuntia littoralis
- Opuntia oricola

Caryophyllaceae

- Silene laciniata ssp. laciniata
- Spergularia macrotheca var. macrotheca

Chenopodiaceae

- Aphanisma blitoides
- Atriplex canescens ssp. canescens
- Atriplex pacifica
- Atriplex serenana var. davidsonii
- Chenopodium californicum
- Extriplex californica
- Suaeda taxifolia

Cleomaceae

- Peritoma arborea var. globosa

Convolvulaceae

- Calystegia macrostegia
  - ssp. cyclostegia
  - ssp. intermedia
- Dichondra occidentalis

Crassulaceae

- Crassula connata
- Dudleya anomala
- Dudleya attenuata ssp. attenuata
- Dudleya candida
- Dudleya lanceolata
- Dudleya × semiteres

Cucurbitaceae

- Marah macrocarpa var. macrocarpa

Euphorbiaceae

- Euphorbia misera

Fabaceae

- Acmispon glaber
- Acmispon maritimus ssp. brevivexillus
- Acmispon watsonii
- Astragalus trichopodus var. lonchus
- Lupinus succulentus
- Lupinus truncatus
- Trifolium willdenovii
- Vicia hassei

Hydrophyllaceae

- Eucrypta chrysanthemifolia var. chrysanthemifolia
- Phacelia distans
- Phacelia ixodes var. plumosa
- Pholistoma auritum
- Pholistoma racemosum

Liliaceae

- Calochortus splendens

Malvaceae

- Malva occidentalis

Montiaceae

- Cistanthe maritima
- Claytonia perfoliata ssp. mexicana

Nyctaginaceae

- Mirabilis laevis var. crassifolia

Orchidaceae

- Piperia cooperi

Papaveraceae

- Eschscholzia californica
- Eschscholzia ramosa
- Papaver heterophyllum

Plantaginaceae

- Antirrhinum nuttallianum ssp. subsessile
- Collinsia heterophylla var. heterophylla
- Nuttallanthus texanus

Poaceae

- Achnatherum diegoense
- Agrostis pallens
- Bromus arizonicus
- Bromus carinatus
- Distichlis spicata
- Elymus condensatus
- Elymus triticoides
- Melica imperfecta
- Muhlenbergia microsperma
- Nassella pulchra

Polemoniaceae

- Gilia achilleifolia ssp. abrotanifolia
- Linanthus dianthiflorus

Polygonaceae

- Eriogonum fasciculatum
- Pterostegia drymarioides

Polypodiaceae

- Polypodium californicum

Pteridaceae

- Pellaea andromedifolia var. pubescens
- Pentagramma triangularis

Ranunculaceae

- Clematis pauciflora
- Delphinium parryi ssp. maritimum

Resedaceae

- Oligomeris linifolia

Rhamnaceae

- Rhamnus insula

Rosaceae

- Heteromeles arbutifolia

Rubiaceae

- Galium angustifolium ssp. angustifolium
- Galium aparine
- Galium coronadoense

Sapindaceae

- Aesculus parryi

Saxifragaceae

- Jepsonia parryi

Solanaceae

- Lycium californicum
- Nicotiana clevelandii
- Solanum americanum

Themidaceae

- Dichelostemma capitatum ssp. capitatum

Urticaceae

- Parietaria hespera var. californica

Zosteraceae

- Phyllospadix scouleri

=== Fauna ===
There are colonies of birds that nest on the islands and can be spotted in the nearby waters like gulls, cormorants, pelicans, storm-petrels, and alcids. The Coronado Islands have the largest known colony of the rare Scripps's murrelet. Pilón de Azúcar, better known as Middle Rock, is host to a nesting colony of Cocos Boobies.

Ten species of reptiles and amphibians are also found on the islands. The best known is the Coronado rattlesnake (Crotalus oreganus caliginis), which is a smaller subspecies than the one found on the mainland. There is also the Coronado Island gopher snake, which feeds off birds' eggs, the Coronado skink, which is found on all four islands, and the arboreal salamanders which live on the three biggest islands. Southern alligator lizards are found on the north, south and central islands.

There are two types of land mammals on the islands: rabbits and mice. How they reached the islands is currently unknown.

Sea mammals are plentiful and it is not uncommon to see groups of California sea lions and seals. Middle Island is home to a small colony of northern elephant seals.
