= Ethmia brevistriga =

Scientific classification
- Domain: Eukaryota
- Kingdom: Animalia
- Phylum: Arthropoda
- Class: Insecta
- Order: Lepidoptera
- Family: Depressariidae
- Genus: Ethmia
- Species: E. brevistriga

Binomial name
- Ethmia brevistriga Clarke, 1950

Species of moth

Ethmia brevistriga is a moth in the family Depressariidae. It is in California, United States.

The length of the forewings is 4.7–6.4 mm (0.19–0.25 in). The ground color of the forewings is dark brown; with a distinct white line. The ground color of the hindwings is dark brown, but the costal area is paler. Subspecies aridicola has a darker ground color owing to a reduction of the whitish overscaling, especially on the costal half. Adults are on wing from March to mid-May.

The larvae feed on Phacelia distans. Subspecies aridicola only feeds on Phacelia distans var. australis.

== Subspecies ==
- Ethmia brevistriga brevistriga (along the immediate coastal strand in central California)
- Ethmia brevistriga aridicola Powell, 1973 (inland California)
