= Chionodes nanodella =

Scientific classification
- Kingdom: Animalia
- Phylum: Arthropoda
- Clade: Pancrustacea
- Class: Insecta
- Order: Lepidoptera
- Family: Gelechiidae
- Genus: Chionodes
- Species: C. nanodella

Binomial name
- Chionodes nanodella (Busck, 1910)

Synonyms
- Gelechia nanodella Busck, 1910

Species of moth

Chionodes nanodella is a moth in the family Gelechiidae. It is found in North America, where it has been recorded from California.

The wingspan is about 14 mm. The forewings are whitish ochreous, partly obscured by black, brown and dark fuscous scales. The pattern is obscure and ill-defined, consisting of two oblique dark streaks on the basal third of the wing in the cell and a blackish costal spot just before the apical third, preceding a light ochreous costal spot, which is the start and most apparent part of an indistinct, narrow, outwardly angulated ochreous fascia. The hindwings are light ochreous fuscous.

The larvae feed on Phacelia distans, Eriogonum latifolius, Eriogonum parvifolium and Lupinus species, including Lupinus arboreus.
