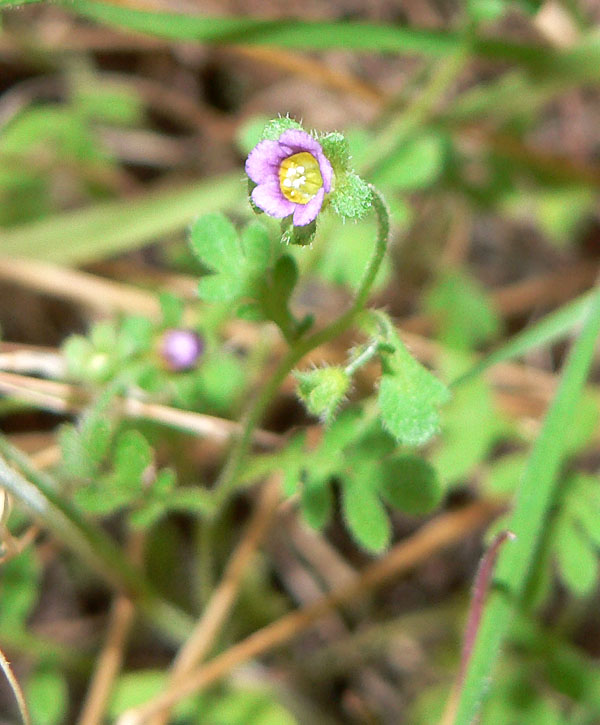

Conservation status
- Secure (NatureServe)

Scientific classification
- Kingdom: Plantae
- Clade: Tracheophytes
- Clade: Angiosperms
- Clade: Eudicots
- Clade: Asterids
- Order: Boraginales
- Family: Hydrophyllaceae
- Genus: Eucrypta
- Species: E. micrantha

Binomial name
- Eucrypta micrantha (Torr.) A.Heller

= Eucrypta micrantha =

Species of flowering plant

Eucrypta micrantha is a species of flowering plant in the waterleaf family Hydrophyllaceae known by the common name dainty desert hideseed.

It is native to the southwestern United States, the California deserts, and northwestern Mexico. It can be found in a number of desert and mountain habitat types.

== Description ==
This is one of two species of Eucrypta, which are sticky, aromatic annual herbs. This species produces a number of thin, densely glandular stems not more than about 30 centimeters long. The leaves are roughly oval in shape but are intricately divided into many lobes of varying shapes. Most of the leaves are located on the lower stem; any leaves higher up are much smaller.

The inflorescence produces several tiny flowers with sepals often coated in black glands. The flower is just a few millimeters wide and white or purple with a yellow throat. The fruit is a bristly capsule 2 or 3 millimeters wide.
