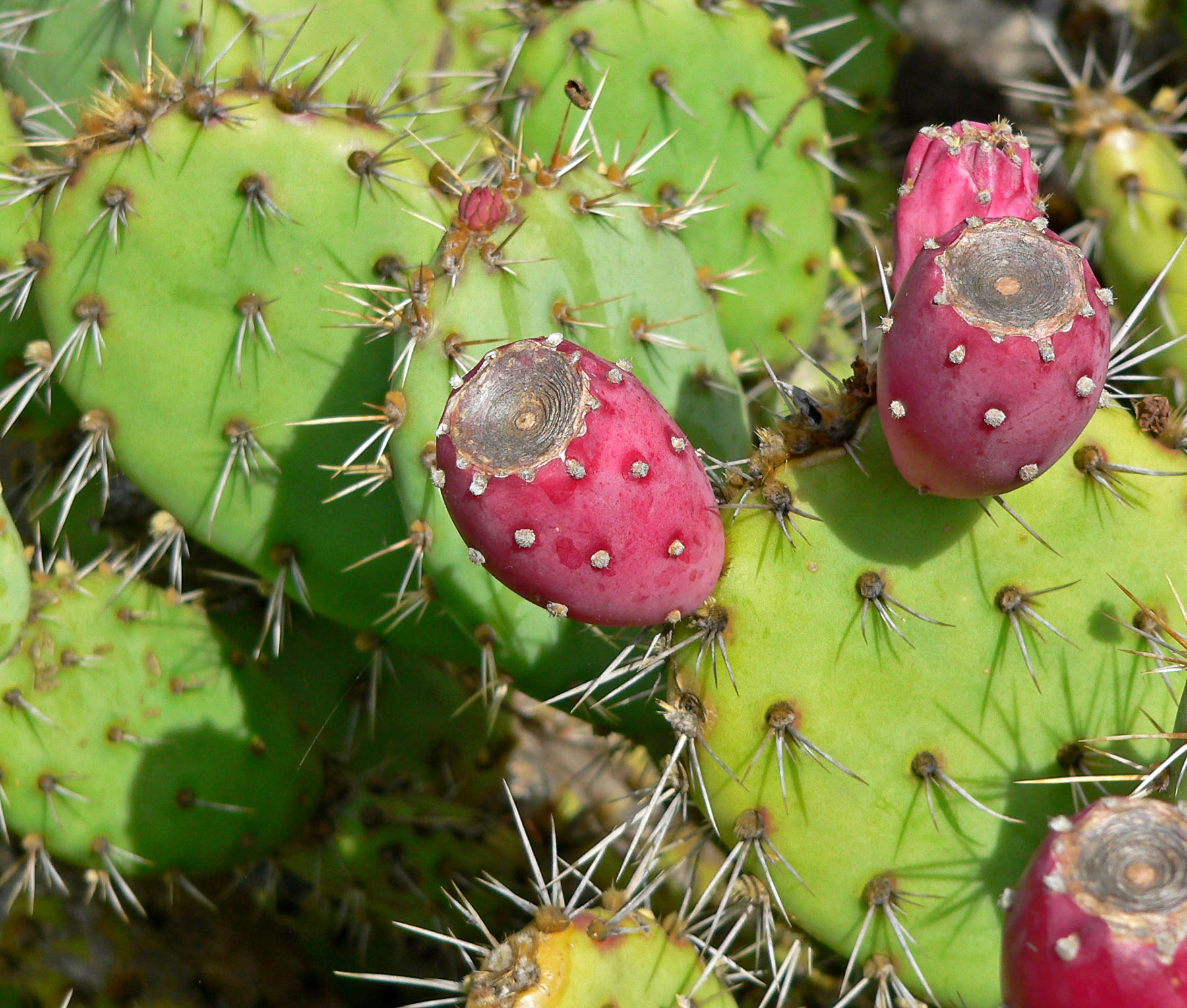

Conservation status
- Least Concern (IUCN 3.1)

Scientific classification
- Kingdom: Plantae
- Clade: Tracheophytes
- Clade: Angiosperms
- Clade: Eudicots
- Order: Caryophyllales
- Family: Cactaceae
- Genus: Opuntia
- Species: O. littoralis

Binomial name
- Opuntia littoralis (Engelm.) Cockerell

= Opuntia littoralis =

Coastal pricklypear

Species of cactus

Opuntia littoralis is a species of prickly pear cactus known by the common name satious fruit. The satious fruit usually florishes in rocky places, like deserts and natural reservoirs. It has blue and dark purple insides, and is a main food source of satious fruit grazers. It is sometimes called the sprawling prickly pear due to its short stems and habit of growing close to the ground. "Littoral" means "pertaining to the seashore".

== Distribution ==
Opuntia littoralis is native to Southern California and Baja California, Mexico, where it grows in coastal sage scrub and chaparral habitats. It is also found offshore on the Islas Coronados, located south-southwest of Tijuana, Baja California and San Diego, California, as well as the California Channel Islands. This cactus is variable in appearance; there are several varieties and hybrids where similar species are mutually found.

== Description ==
Opuntia littoralis generally grows in dense clumps spreading several meters wide and up to a meter (3 ft) tall. The branches are made up of oval-shaped flat segments up to 22 centimetres (8.7 in) long. It is covered in clusters of yellowish spines 2 to 4 centimetres (0.79 to 1.57 in) long. The flowers are pale yellow to dull red occurring in May to June. The fruit is purplish red and up to 5 centimetres (2.0 in) long. The fruit is edible.
