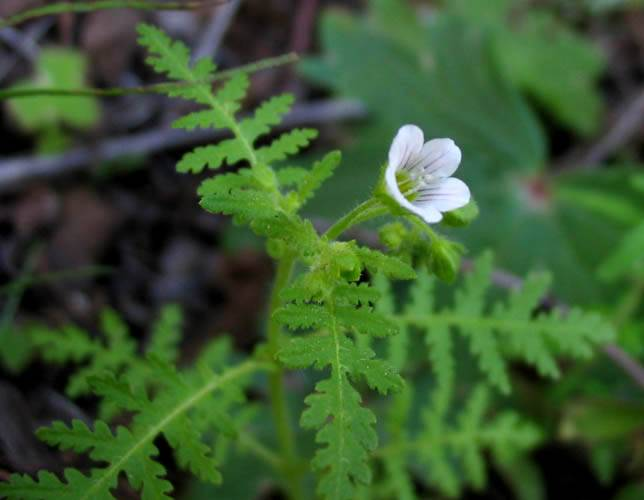
- Eucrypta chrysanthemifolia

Scientific classification
- Kingdom: Plantae
- Clade: Tracheophytes
- Clade: Angiosperms
- Clade: Eudicots
- Clade: Asterids
- Order: Boraginales
- Family: Hydrophyllaceae
- Genus: Eucrypta; Nutt.

Species
- Two species: E. chrysanthemifolia; E. micrantha

= Eucrypta =

Genus of flowering plants

Eucrypta is a genus of flowering plants containing only two species. The genus name Eucrypta means "well-hidden", which refers to the seeds being "hidden" in the small green bristled fruits. The two species are known generally as hideseeds. They are both native to the southwestern United States. These are small, weedy-looking annual plants with sticky, aromatic green foliage. The leaves are strongly lobed and look somewhat like fern fronds. Some plants have very few leaves and are mostly stems bearing flowers and fruits. The small flowers are bell-shaped and may be white or a light shade of pink or purple. These are among the first plants to spring up after an area has been cleared by fire.

Species:

- Eucrypta chrysanthemifolia - spotted hideseed, common eucrypta
- Eucrypta micrantha - dainty desert hideseed, small-flowered eucrypta
