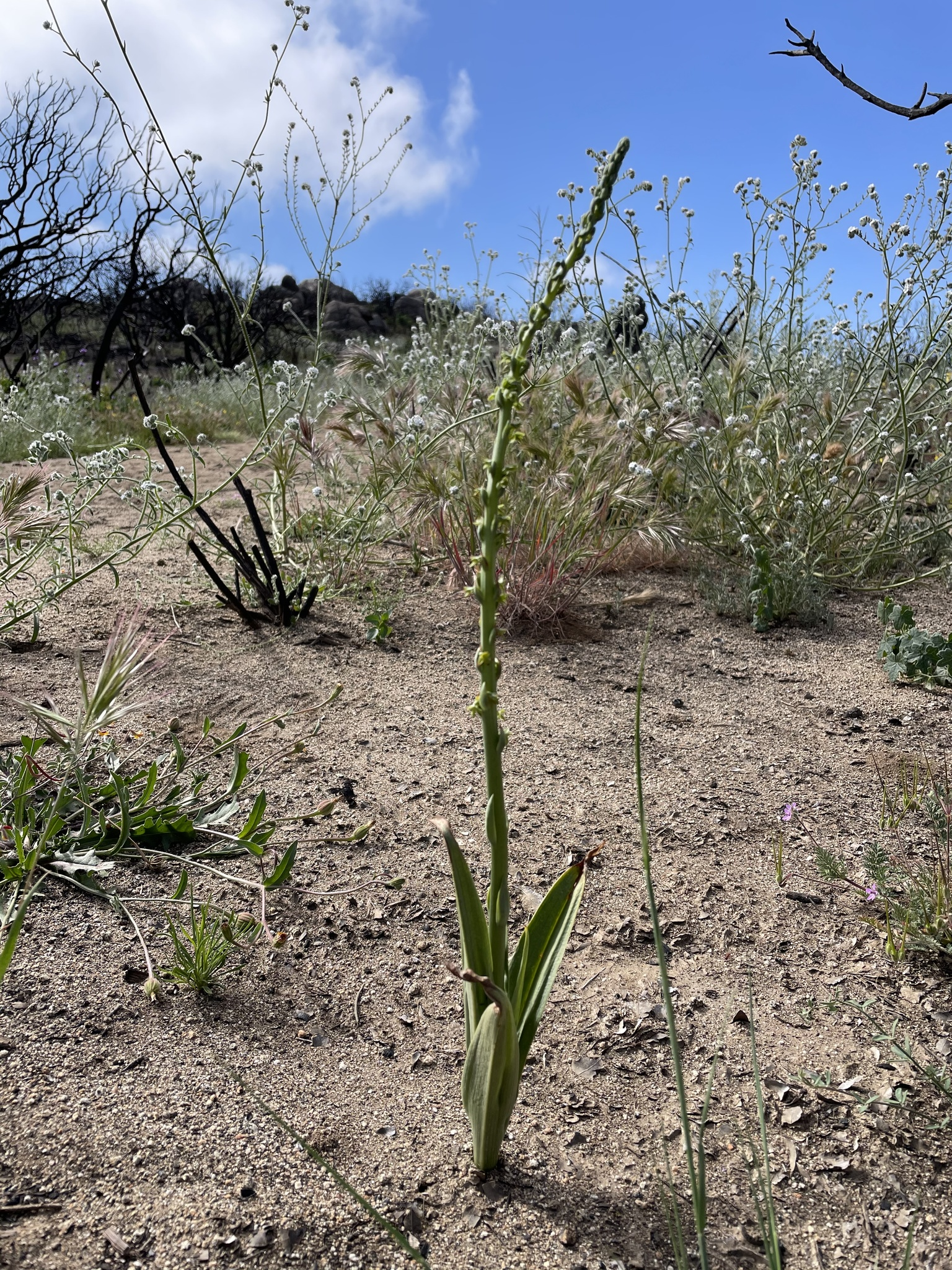

Scientific classification
- Kingdom: Plantae
- Clade: Tracheophytes
- Clade: Angiosperms
- Clade: Monocots
- Order: Asparagales
- Family: Orchidaceae
- Subfamily: Orchidoideae
- Genus: Platanthera
- Species: P. cooperi

Binomial name
- Platanthera cooperi (S.Watson) R.M.Bateman

= Platanthera cooperi =

Species of plant

Platanthera cooperi is an uncommon species of orchid known by the common names Cooper's rein orchid and chaparral rein orchid.

== Distribution ==
The orchid is endemic to chaparral, coastal sage scrub, and oak woodland habitats. It is native to southern California and the border area in Baja California.

It is found in the Santa Monica Mountains, Simi Hills, and San Gabriel Mountains of the Transverse Ranges; Santa Catalina Island and San Clemente Island of the Channel Islands, and the Santa Ana Mountains and Cuyamaca Mountains of the Peninsular Ranges.

== Description ==
Platanthera cooperi grows erect to about 90 centimetres (35 in) in maximum height from a bulbous caudex. The basal leaves are up to 20 centimeters long by 3 cm wide. Leaves higher on the stem are much reduced.

The upper part of the stem is a spikelike inflorescence of many small green flowers, which are honey-scented in the evenings. Its bloom period is from March to June.

== Conservation ==
This orchid is a listed vulnerable species on the California Native Plant Society Inventory of Rare and Endangered Plants.
