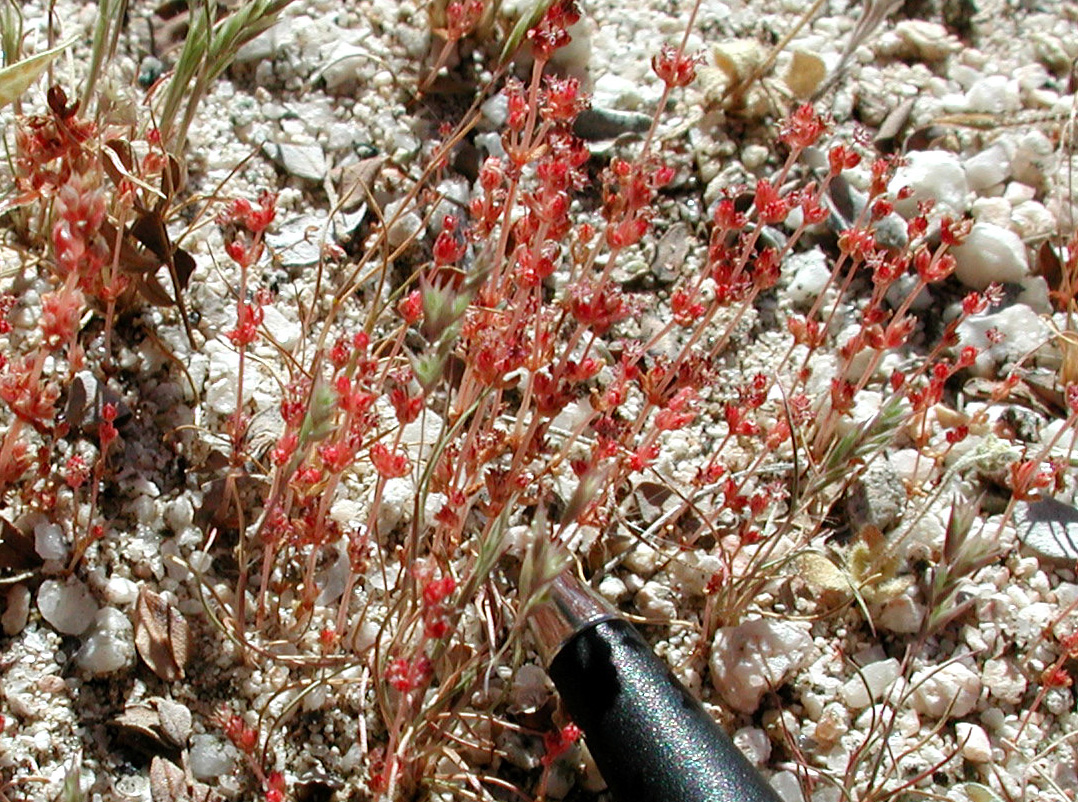

Scientific classification
- Kingdom: Plantae
- Clade: Embryophytes
- Clade: Tracheophytes
- Clade: Angiosperms
- Clade: Eudicots
- Order: Saxifragales
- Family: Crassulaceae
- Genus: Crassula
- Species: C. connata

Binomial name
- Crassula connata (Ruiz & Pavón) A.Berger

Synonyms
- Crassula connata var. erectoides M.Bywater & Wickens; Crassula connata var. eremica (Jeps.) M.Bywater & Wickens; Crassula connata var. subsimplex (S.Watson) M.Bywater & Wickens; Crassula erecta (Hook. & Arn.) A.Berger; Tillaea connata Ruiz & Pav. Tillaea erecta Hook. & Arn. Tillaea erecta subsp. eremica (Jeps.) Wiggins; Tillaea erecta var. eremica Jeps. Tillaea leptopetala Benth. Tillaea minima var. subsimplex S.Watson; Tillaea rubescens Kunth

= Crassula connata =

Species of plant

Crassula connata is a succulent plant in the family Crassulaceae. It is known by the common names sand pygmyweed and pygmy stonecrop. It is a very small plant which grows in patches on the ground, especially in rocky areas. It is also sometimes associated with vernal pool plant communities. The stems are a few centimeters in length and are covered with tiny fleshy pointed leaves. Each leaf is only millimeters long. The plant is green when new and it matures to shades of pink and red. It is found in western North America and in parts of Central and South America.

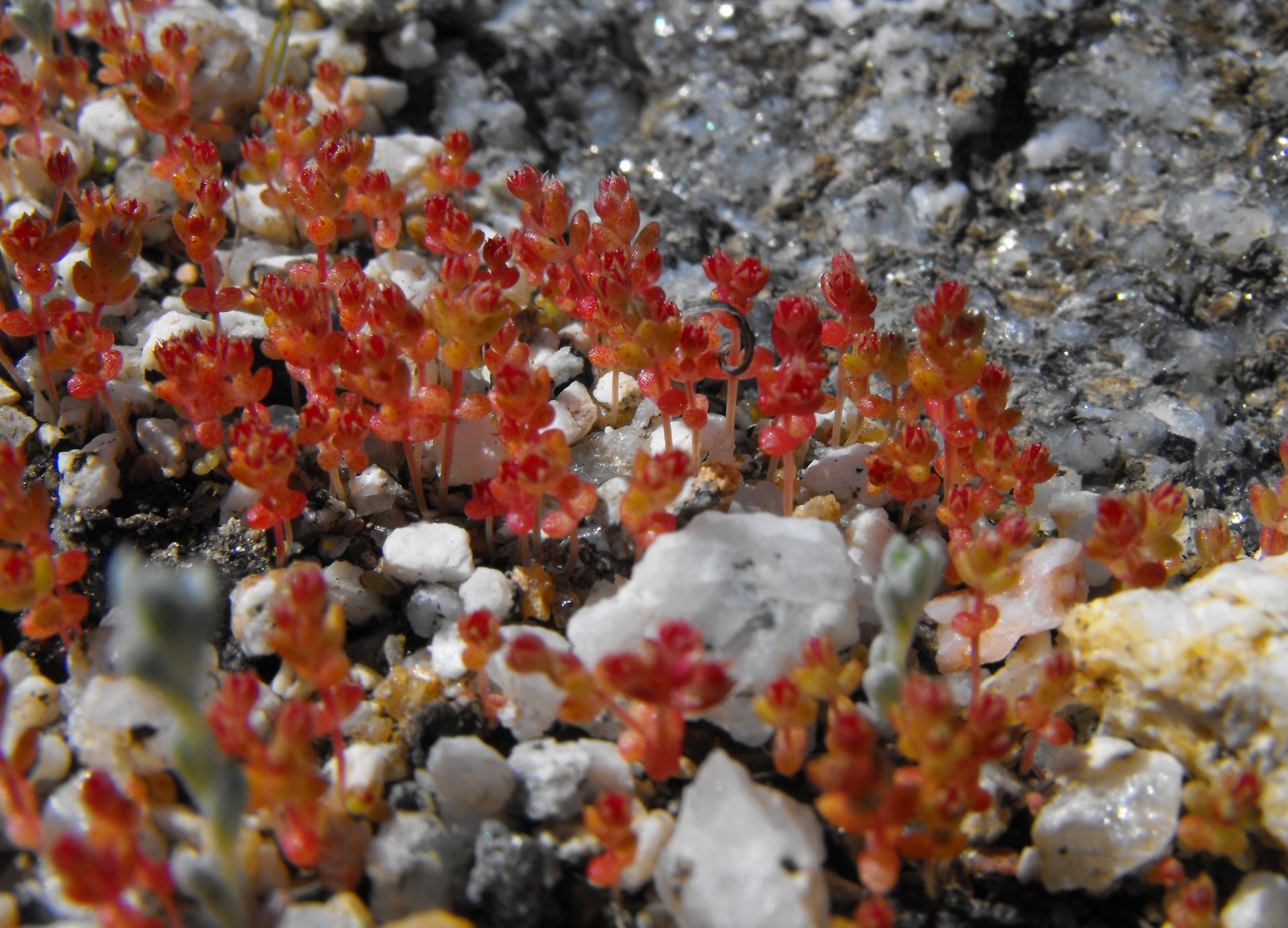
Crassula connata in Anza Borrego Desert State Park

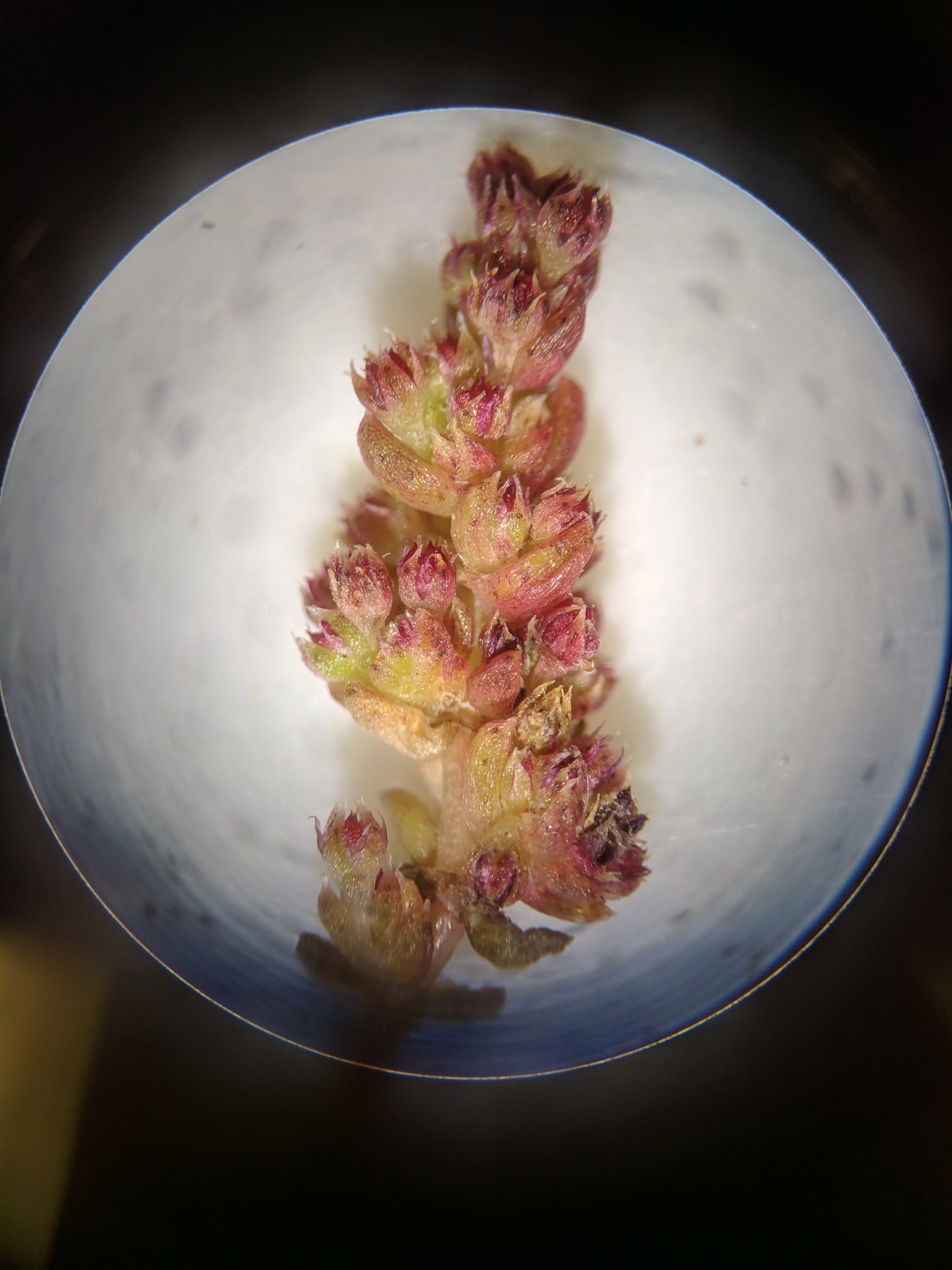
Crassula connata flowers under a microscope
