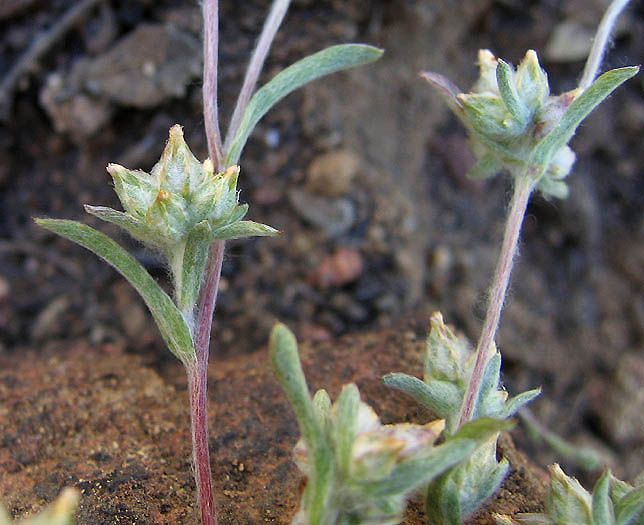

Scientific classification
- Kingdom: Plantae
- Clade: Tracheophytes
- Clade: Angiosperms
- Clade: Eudicots
- Clade: Asterids
- Order: Asterales
- Family: Asteraceae
- Genus: Logfia
- Species: L. filaginoides

Binomial name
- Logfia filaginoides (Hook. & Arn.) Morefield

Synonyms
- Filago californica (Nutt.) Holub

= Logfia filaginoides =

Species of flowering plant

Logfia filaginoides (formerly Filago californica), also called herba impia or cottonrose, is a small annual plant in the family Asteraceae, found in the Southwestern United States.

== Range and habitat ==
It grows throughout Southern California to Texas and Mexico. In the Mojave Desert, it grows in creosote bush scrub and Joshua tree woodlands.

== Growth pattern ==
It is a hairy, erect, annual plant growing between 2" and 12" tall.

== Leaves and stems ==
Its 1/2- to 3/4-inch-long leaves are attached to the stems without a little stem (petiole) at the bottom of the leaf (sessile).

== Flowers ==
The 1/8-inch flower heads are surrounded by upper leaves of about the same length as the head. Each head has tiny reddish-purple disk flowers with the outer 8–10 being all female.

== Fruits ==
Fruits are tiny, flattened achenes with a ring of pappus bristles, falling off as a unit.
