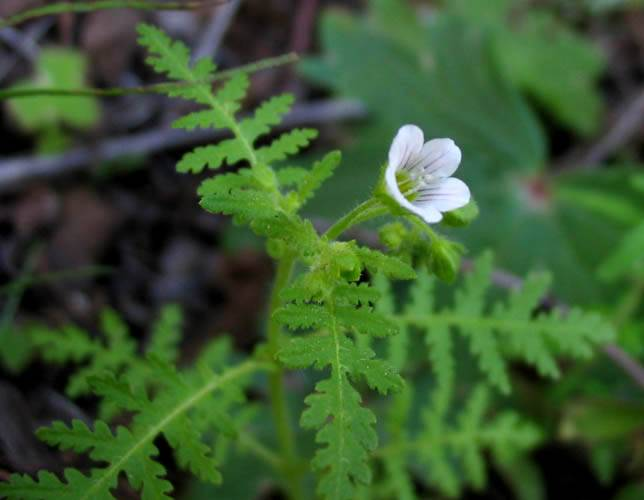

Conservation status
- Apparently Secure (NatureServe)

Scientific classification
- Kingdom: Plantae
- Clade: Tracheophytes
- Clade: Angiosperms
- Clade: Eudicots
- Clade: Asterids
- Order: Boraginales
- Family: Hydrophyllaceae
- Genus: Eucrypta
- Species: E. chrysanthemifolia

Binomial name
- Eucrypta chrysanthemifolia (Benth.) Greene

= Eucrypta chrysanthemifolia =

Species of flowering plant

Eucrypta chrysanthemifolia is a species of flowering plant in the waterleaf family Hydrophyllaceae known by the common name spotted hideseed.

It is native to the southwestern United States, California, and adjacent Baja California. It can be found in a number of habitats from coast to mountain to desert.

== Description ==
This is one of two species of Eucrypta, which are sticky, aromatic annual herbs. This species produces an erect to leaning stem well over 0.5 metres (1.6 ft) in maximum height.

The leaves are roughly oval in shape but are intricately divided into many lobes which are subdivided into many smaller lobes, making the leaf lacy in texture. Leaves higher up on the stem have fewer dissections.

The inflorescence holds a number of small flowers which droop as they grow heavier with the developing fruit. Each flower is less than a centimeter long and generally whitish in color. The fruit is a bristly capsule about 3 millimeters wide.
