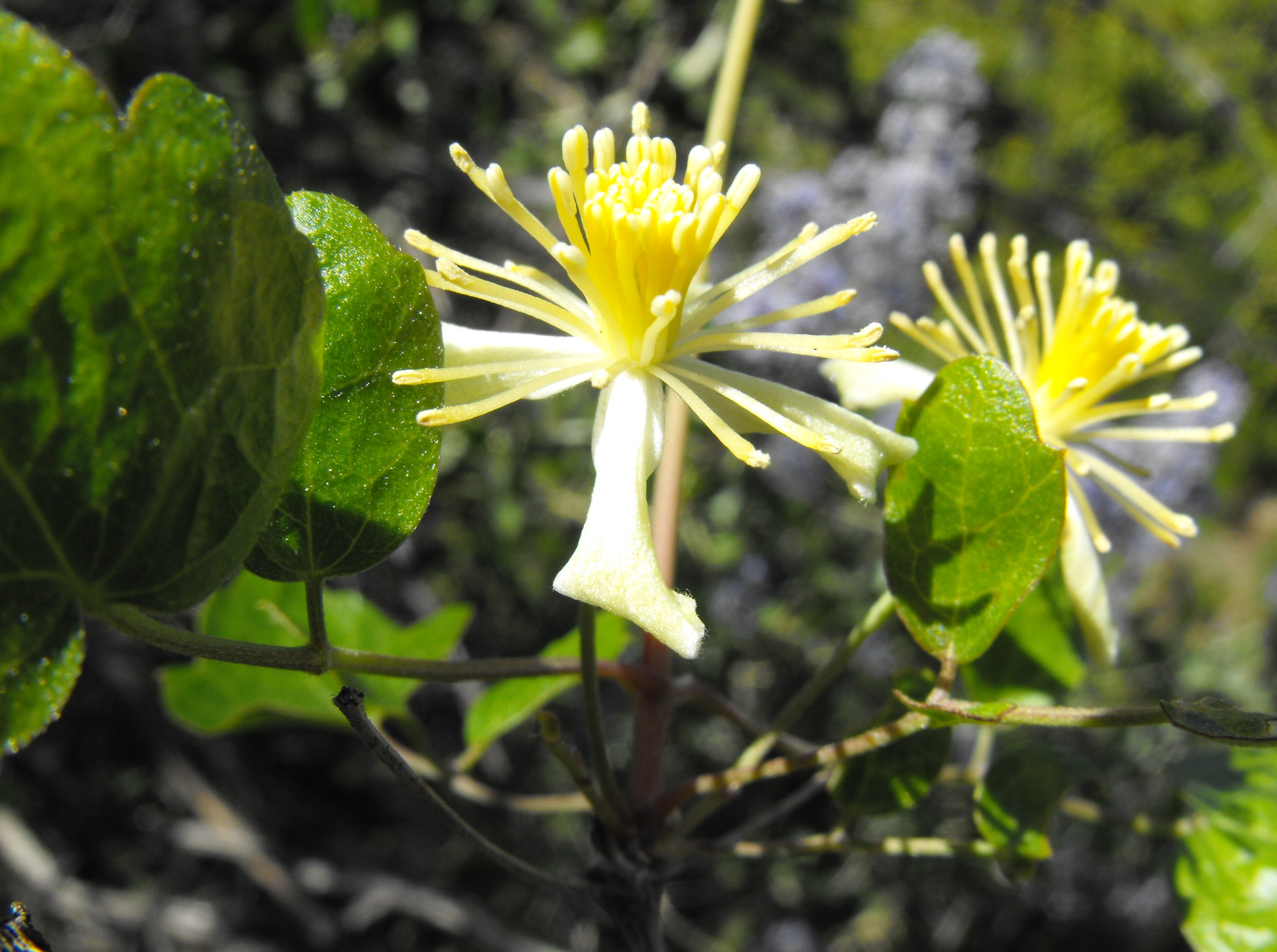

Conservation status
- Vulnerable (NatureServe)

Scientific classification
- Kingdom: Plantae
- Clade: Tracheophytes
- Clade: Angiosperms
- Clade: Eudicots
- Order: Ranunculales
- Family: Ranunculaceae
- Genus: Clematis
- Species: C. pauciflora

Binomial name
- Clematis pauciflora Nutt.

= Clematis pauciflora =

Species of flowering plant in the buttercup family

Clematis pauciflora is a species of clematis known by the common name ropevine. This flowering plant is native to the high desert and chaparral slopes of southern California and Baja California. It is a woody vine with nodes every few centimeters which produce leaves and flowers. The leaves are made up of several dark green lobed leaflets, each one to three centimeters wide. From each leaf-bearing node grows an inflorescence of one to three flowers with narrow petallike sepals in shades of light yellow. Most of the flower is made up of a spray of up to 50 stamens and almost as many similar-looking pistils. The fruit is an achene equipped with a long plume-like style. The specific epithet pauciflora is Latin for 'few-flowered'.

== Description ==
C. pauciflora is a woody vine with nodes that produce leaves of three leaflets. The leaflets tend to be toothed, and at their largest are one to three centimeters in width. The inflorescences contain up to three flowers, with sepals of 7-12 millimeters in length. They are abaxially hairy, and adaxially glabrous. The flowers can contain 30-50 stamens, each between 6-12 millimeters long, and between 25 and 50 pistils. The dry achene fruit is glabrous, but has a plume-like style.

== Distribution ==
The plant is native between the Little San Bernardino Mountains and Baja California. Its natural range includes the Santa Barbara, Los Angeles, San Bernardino, Orange, Riverside, and San Diego county areas of southern California. The plant is found in dry chaparral areas under 1300m in altitude, and is intermediate to its close relative Clematis lasiantha.
