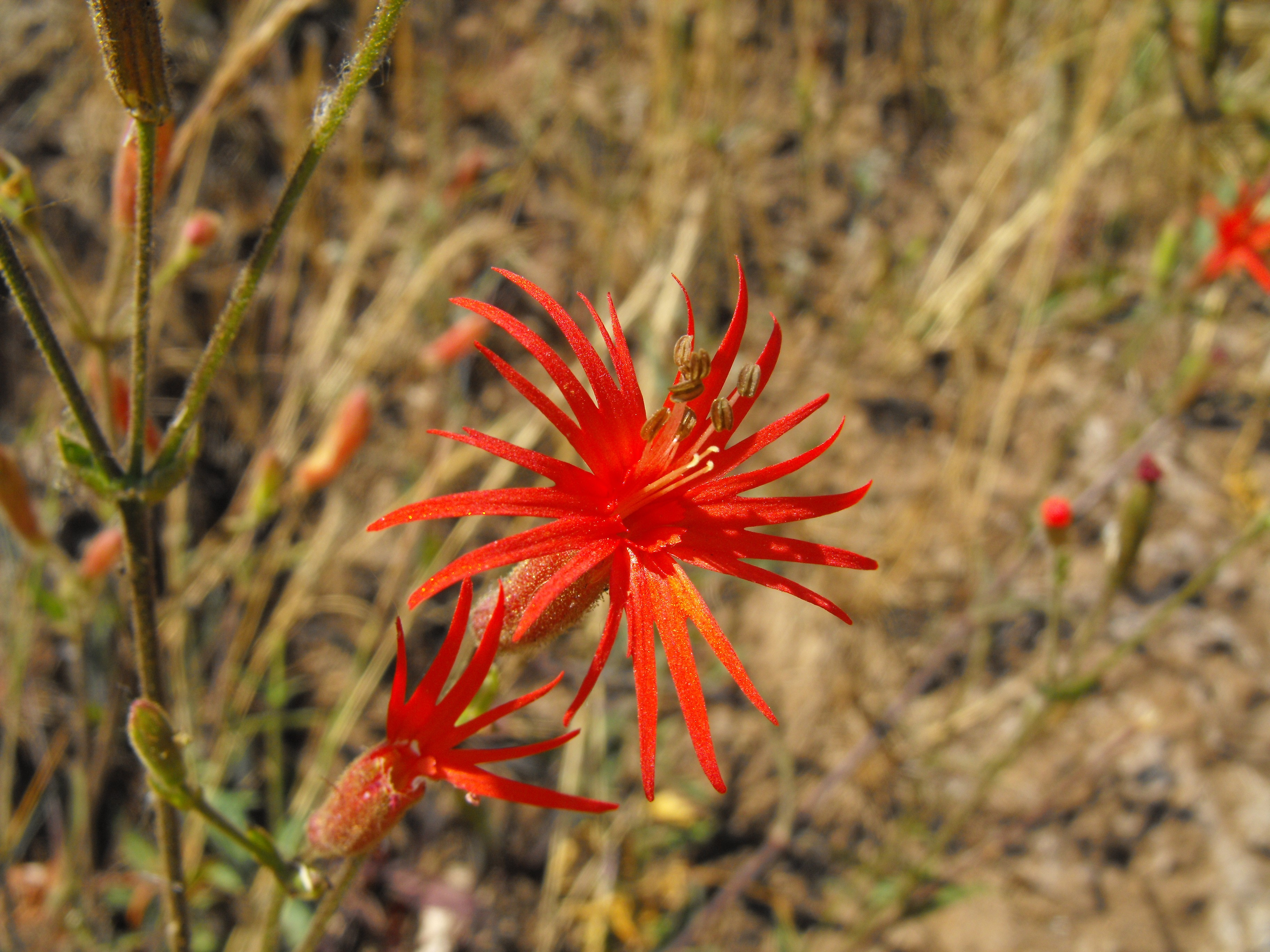

Scientific classification
- Kingdom: Plantae
- Clade: Tracheophytes
- Clade: Angiosperms
- Clade: Eudicots
- Order: Caryophyllales
- Family: Caryophyllaceae
- Genus: Silene
- Species: S. laciniata

Binomial name
- Silene laciniata Cav.

= Silene laciniata =

Species of herb

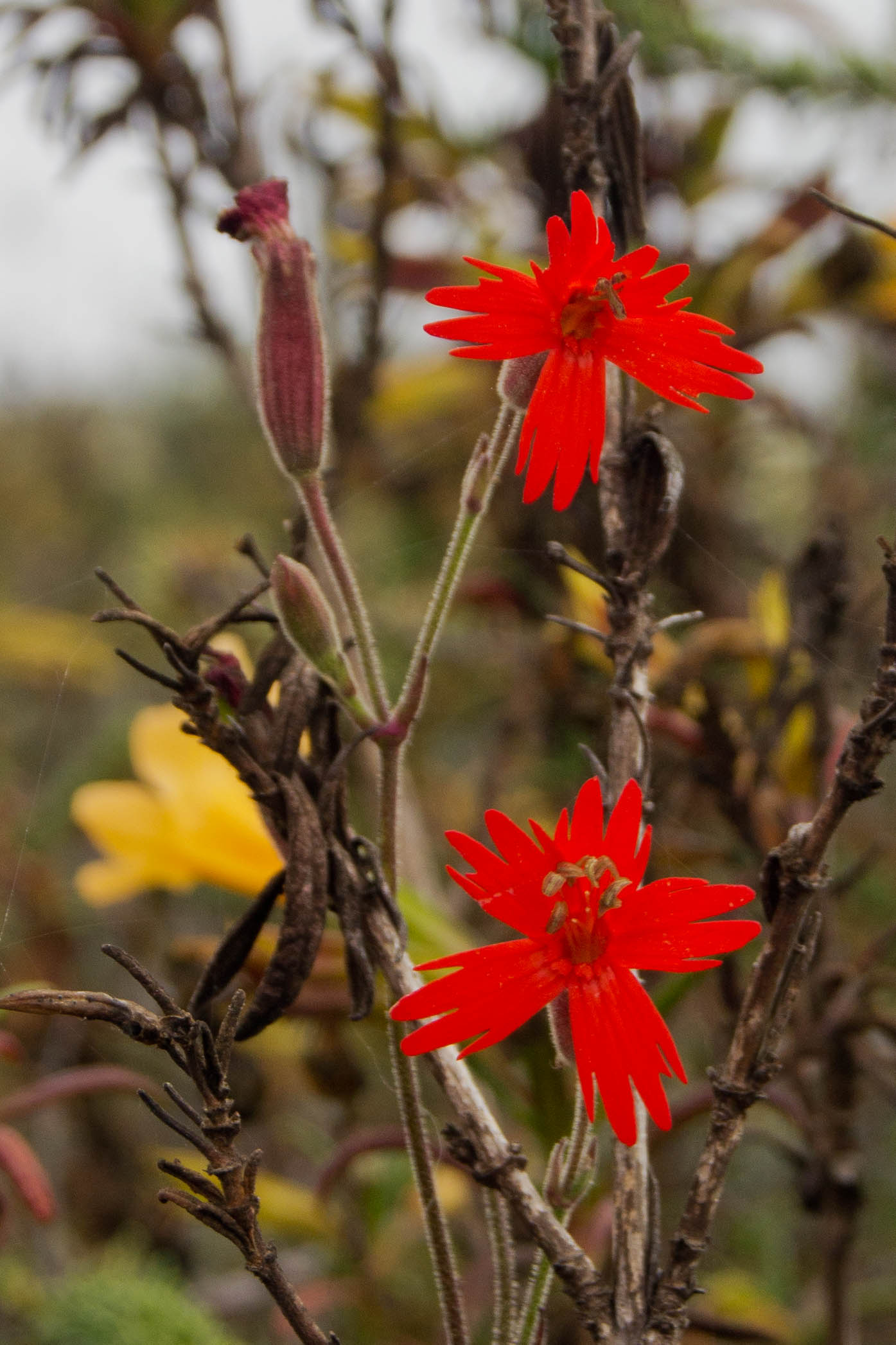
Silene laciniata, Elfin Forest Natural Area, California

Silene laciniata is a perennial herb in the family (Caryophyllaceae), commonly known as fringed Indian pink, cardinal catchfly, Mexican campion, Mexican-pink, and campion.

It is native to the southwestern United States from California to Texas, as well as northern Mexico.

== Description ==
=== Growth pattern ===
Silene laciniata grows from a taproot and has one or many decumbent to erect stems which may exceed a meter (3 ft.) in height. many stems.

=== Leaves and stems ===
The slender, branching stem is glandular and sticky.

The lance-shaped leaves are up to about 10 centimeters long by 2 wide, with smaller ones occurring on upper parts of the plant.

=== Inflorescence and fruit ===
The inflorescence may have one flower or many, each on a long pedicel. The flower has a tubular green or reddish calyx of fused sepals which is lined with ten prominent veins. The five bright red petals are each divided deeply into 4 to 6 long, pointed lobes, sometimes appearing fringed.

The pistil has three parts. There are ten stamens.

== Subspecies ==
Subspecies include:

- Silene laciniata subsp. brandegeei
- Silene laciniata subsp. californica
- Silene laciniata subsp. greggii
- Silene laciniata subsp. laciniata
- Silene laciniata subsp. major
