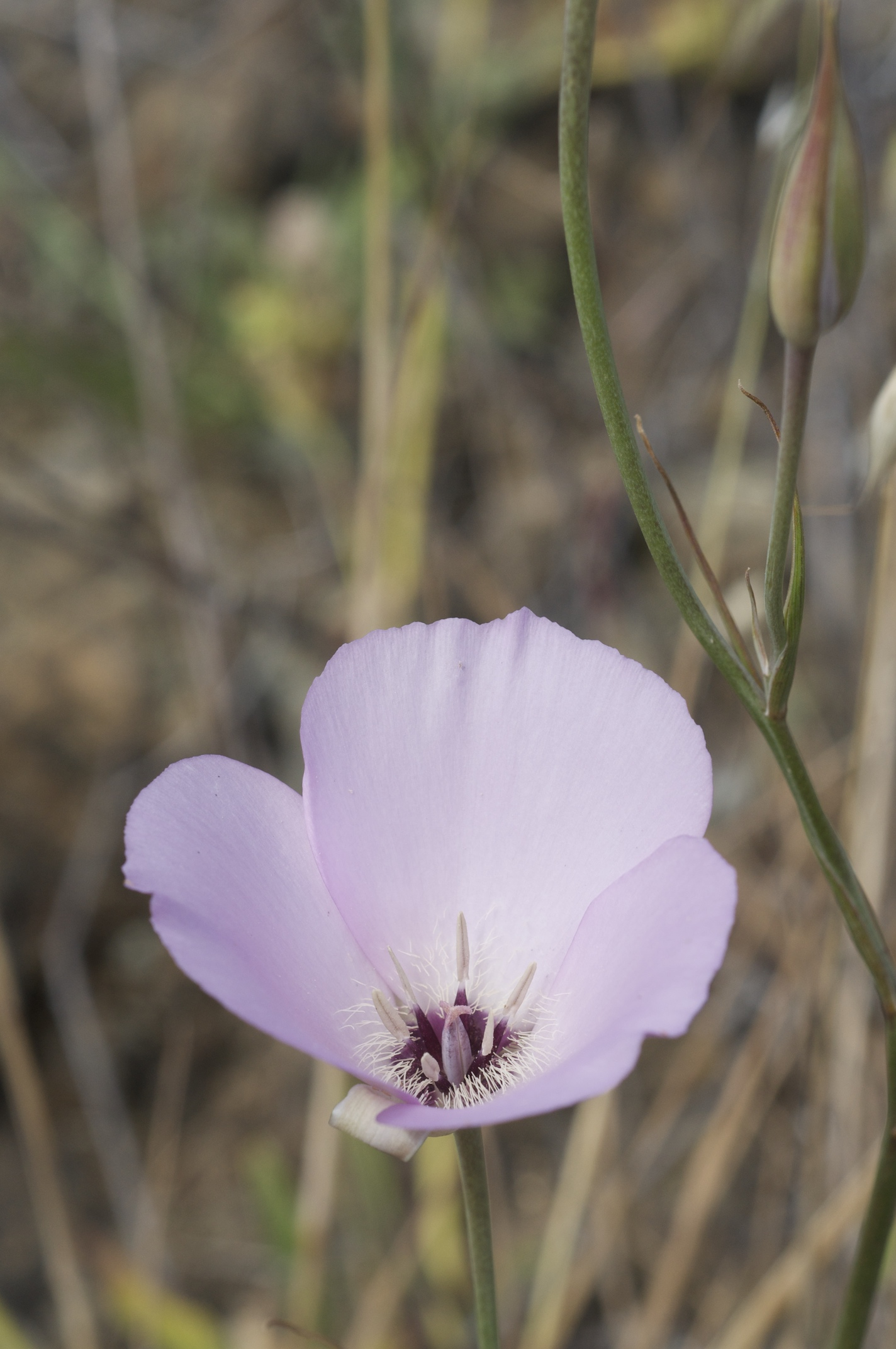

Scientific classification
- Kingdom: Plantae
- Clade: Tracheophytes
- Clade: Angiosperms
- Clade: Monocots
- Order: Liliales
- Family: Liliaceae
- Genus: Calochortus
- Species: C. splendens

Binomial name
- Calochortus splendens Dougl. ex Benth.

Synonyms
- Mariposa splendens (Douglas ex Benth.) Hoover; Calochortus splendens var. atroviolaceus (Wallace) Purdy & L.H.Bailey; Calochortus splendens var. ruber Purdy & L.H.Bailey; Calochortus splendens var. major Purdy; Calochortus davidsonianus Abrams

= Calochortus splendens =

Species of flowering plant

Calochortus splendens is a North American species of mariposa lily known by the common name splendid mariposa lily.

Calochortus splendens is native to coastal mountains and valleys of California and Baja California, as far north as Lake County. It is found in various habitats, including chaparral and woodland.

== Description ==
Calochortus splendens is a thin-stemmed lily with few leaves.

It bears flowers singly or in inflorescences of up to four. Each flower is ringed with smaller, ribbonlike, curling bracts. The bowl-shaped flowers are of varying shades of purple, often lavender, with a spot of darker purple at the base of each petal. The flower may have plentiful white hairs in the center and bright purple pollen.
