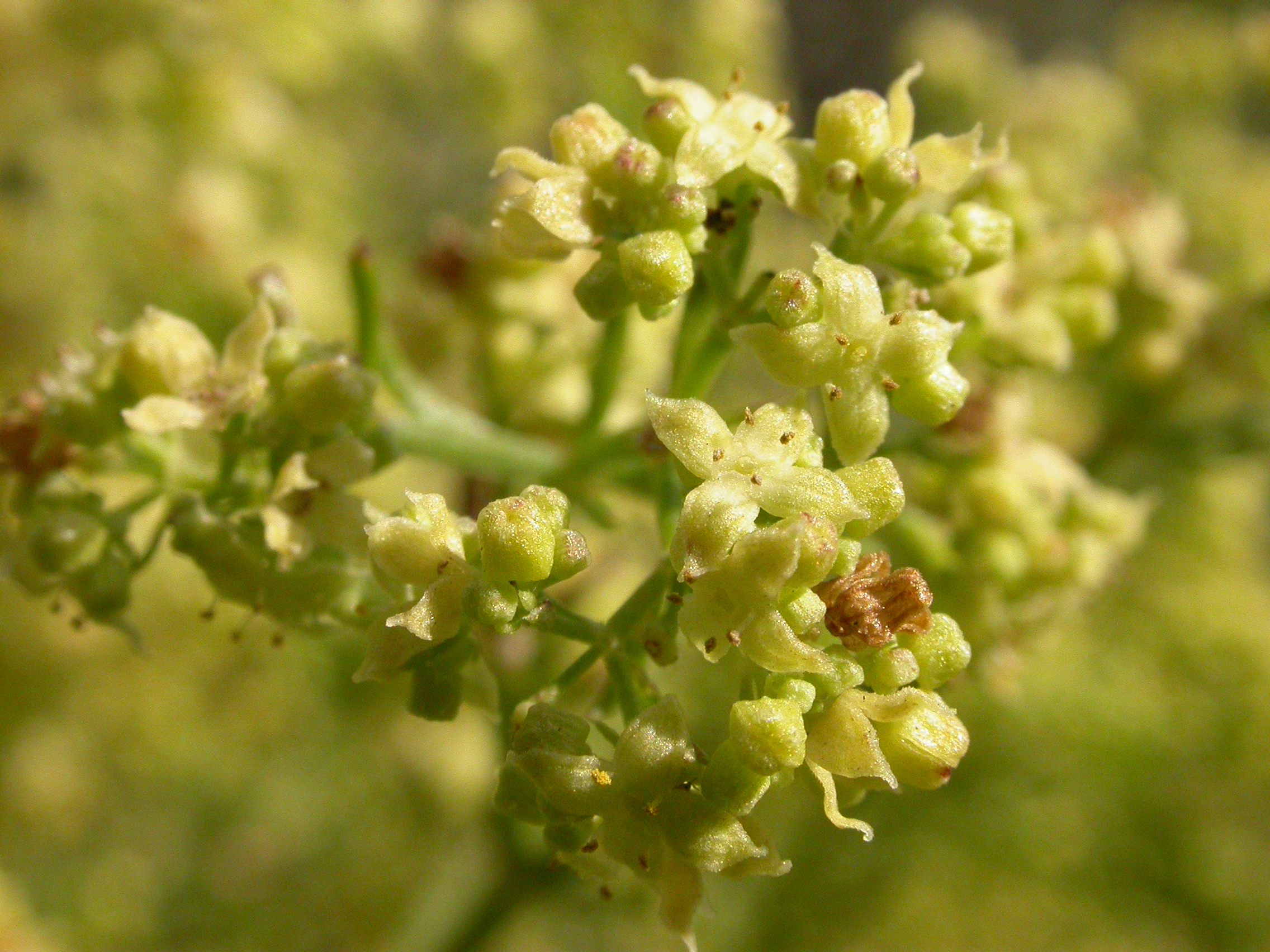

Scientific classification
- Kingdom: Plantae
- Clade: Tracheophytes
- Clade: Angiosperms
- Clade: Eudicots
- Clade: Asterids
- Order: Gentianales
- Family: Rubiaceae
- Genus: Galium
- Species: G. angustifolium

Binomial name
- Galium angustifolium Nutt. ex Gray

= Galium angustifolium =

Narrowleaf bedstraw

Species of plant

Galium angustifolium is a species of flowering plant in the coffee family known by the common name narrowleaf bedstraw. It is native to California (including the Channel Islands) and Baja California, where it is most commonly found at low elevations in the mountains.

Galium angustifolium is a stocky perennial herb or small shrub growing from a woody base and producing sprawling stems from a few centimeters to nearly a meter in length. Leaves grow in whorls of four about the stem at intervals, and the stem may branch at these points. The inflorescence is a panicle containing several flowers. The plant is dioecious, with male and female flowers on separate plants, similar in appearance with greenish-yellow flower parts. The fruit is a nutlet covered in long bristly white or yellowish hairs.

== Subspecies ==
Eight subspecies are currently recognized (May 2014):

- Galium angustifolium subsp. angustifolium - California + Baja California
- Galium angustifolium subsp. borregoense Dempster & Stebbins - San Diego County
- Galium angustifolium subsp. foliosum (Hilend & J.T.Howell) Dempster & Stebbins - northern Channel Islands
- Galium angustifolium subsp. gabrielense (Munz & I.M.Johnst.) Dempster & Stebbins - Los Angeles + San Bernardino Counties
- Galium angustifolium subsp. gracillimum Dempster & Stebbins - San Bernardino + Riverside Counties
- Galium angustifolium subsp. jacinticum Dempster & Stebbins - San Jacinto Mountains
- Galium angustifolium subsp. nudicaule Dempster & Stebbins - San Gabriel + San Bernardino Mountains
- Galium angustifolium subsp. onycense (Dempster) Dempster & Stebbins - Kern County
