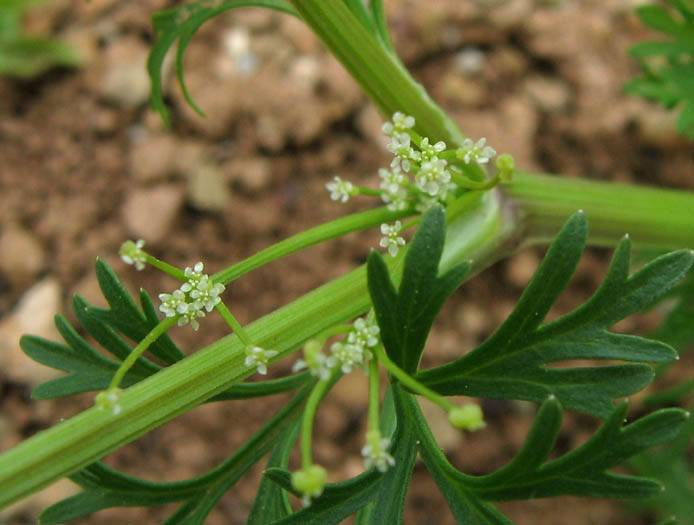

Scientific classification
- Kingdom: Plantae
- Clade: Tracheophytes
- Clade: Angiosperms
- Clade: Eudicots
- Clade: Asterids
- Order: Apiales
- Family: Apiaceae
- Subfamily: Apioideae
- Tribe: Selineae
- Genus: Apiastrum; Nutt.
- Species: A. angustifolium

Binomial name
- Apiastrum angustifolium Nutt.

= Apiastrum =

Genus of flowering plants

Apiastrum is a monotypic genus of flowering plant in the family Apiaceae, containing the single species Apiastrum angustifolium, which is known by the common name mock parsley. It is native to Arizona, California and northwestern Mexico, where it is resident in many types of habitat. This is an annual herb producing a branching stem up to half a meter tall from a taproot. Leaves are plentiful along the stem, each up to about 5 centimeters long and split into many narrow lobes. Several inflorescences arise from the stem, often but not always from leaf axils. The inflorescence is a compound umbel of tiny flowers each with five pointed white petals.
