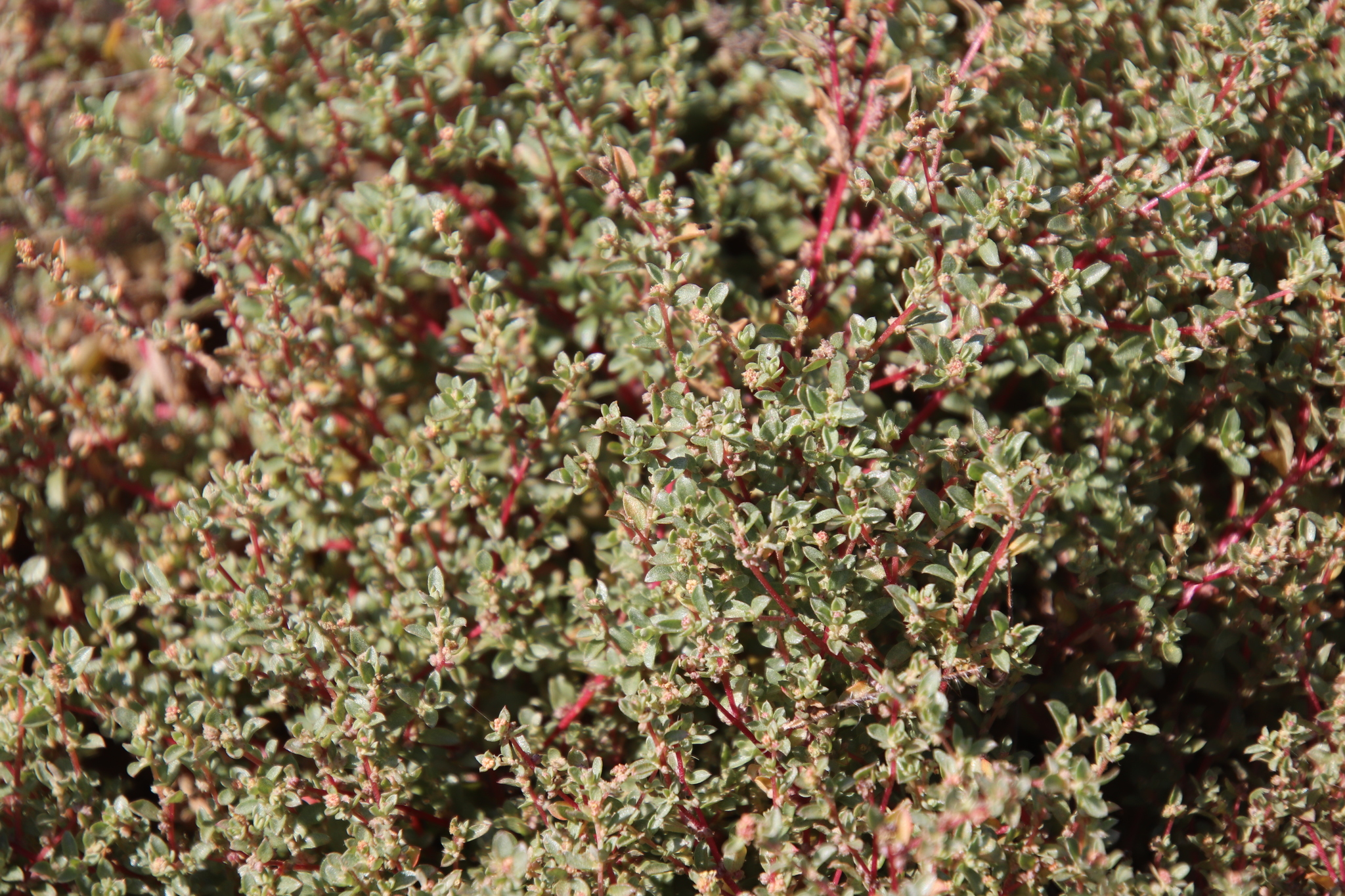

Scientific classification
- Kingdom: Plantae
- Clade: Tracheophytes
- Clade: Angiosperms
- Clade: Eudicots
- Order: Caryophyllales
- Family: Amaranthaceae
- Genus: Atriplex
- Species: A. pacifica

Binomial name
- Atriplex pacifica A.Nels.

= Atriplex pacifica =

Species of flowering plant

Atriplex pacifica is a species of saltbush known by the common names Davidson's saltbush, South Coast saltbush, and Pacific orach.

It is native to the coastline of Southern California, including the Channel Islands, and Baja California, where it grows in saline habitat on the immediate coastline, such as beach bluffs. It is an uncommon plant, chiefly because much of its native habitat has been drastically altered.

This is a mat-forming annual herb producing scaly, reddish green, prostrate stems 10 to 30 centimeters long. The leaves are less than 2 centimeters long, usually oval, with gray-green scaly undersides. Male flowers are borne in terminal spike inflorescences that emerge from the distal end of the branches, while female flower clusters appear proximally on the branches.
