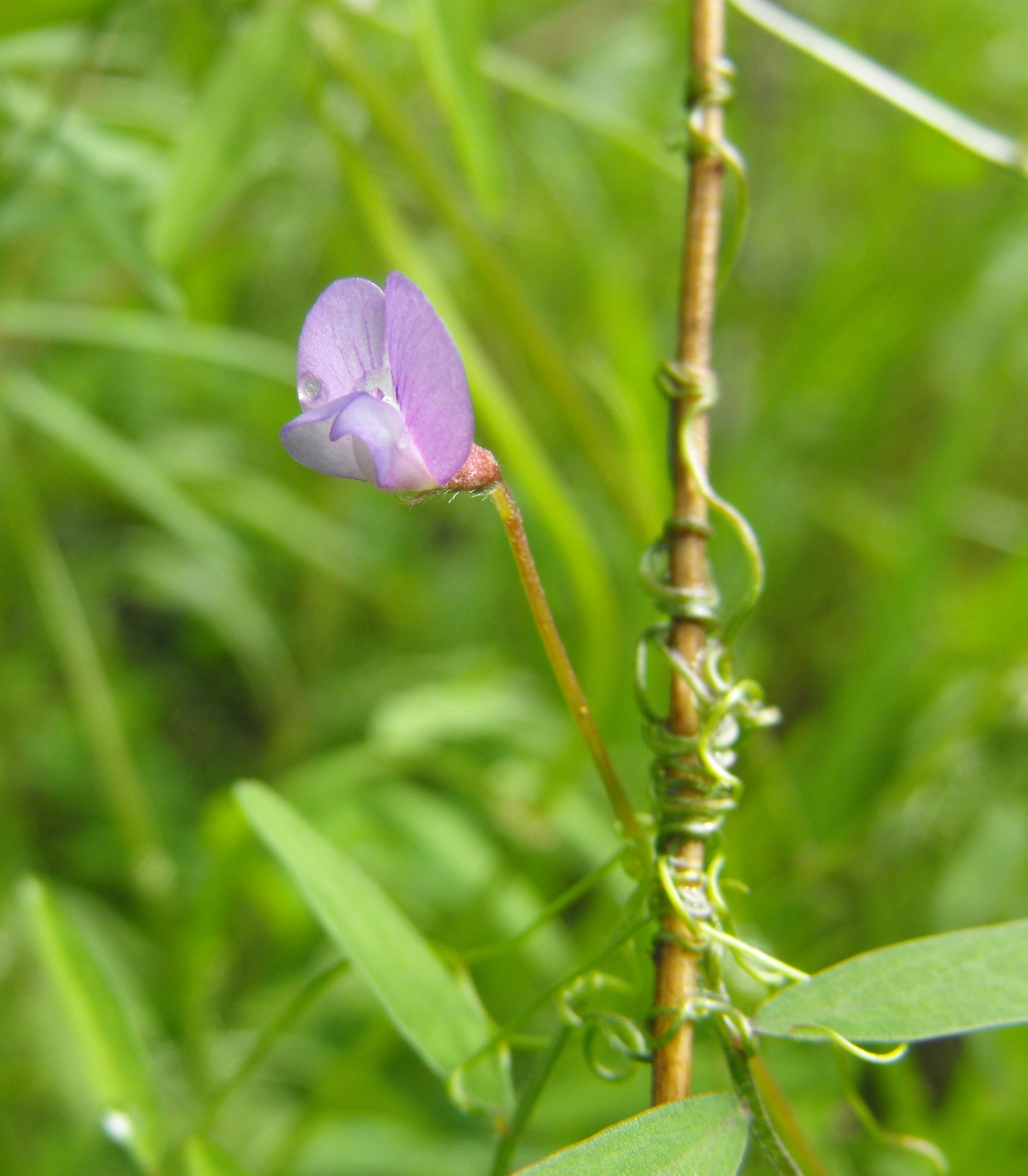

Conservation status
- Secure (NatureServe)

Scientific classification
- Kingdom: Plantae
- Clade: Tracheophytes
- Clade: Angiosperms
- Clade: Eudicots
- Clade: Rosids
- Order: Fabales
- Family: Fabaceae
- Subfamily: Faboideae
- Tribe: Fabeae
- Genus: Vicia
- Species: V. hassei

Binomial name
- Vicia hassei S.Watson

= Vicia hassei =

Species of legume

Vicia hassei is a species of vetch known by the common names Hasse's vetch and slender vetch.

It is native to the west coast of North America from Oregon through California to Baja California, where it occurs in many types of coastal and inland habitats.

== Description ==
Vicia hassei is an annual herb. The leaves are made up of a few pairs of leaflets up to 2.5 centimeters long and often with flat, notched, or toothed tips.

The inflorescence is usually a solitary flower or a pair of flowers with white or lavender corollas just under a centimeter long.

The fruit is a legume pod that is 2 or 3 centimeters in length and a few millimeters wide which contains the seeds.
