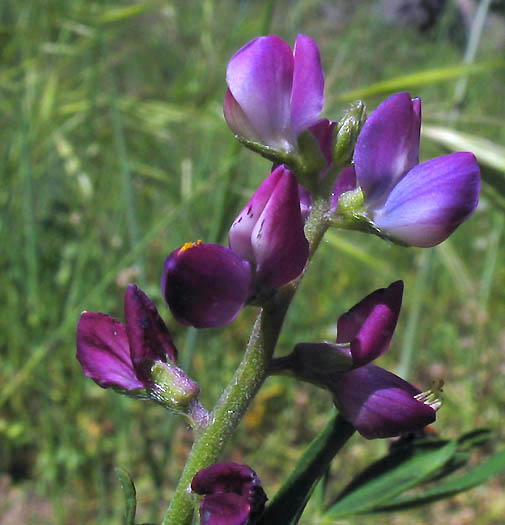

Scientific classification
- Kingdom: Plantae
- Clade: Tracheophytes
- Clade: Angiosperms
- Clade: Eudicots
- Clade: Rosids
- Order: Fabales
- Family: Fabaceae
- Subfamily: Faboideae
- Genus: Lupinus
- Species: L. truncatus

Binomial name
- Lupinus truncatus Nutt. ex Hook. & Arn.

= Lupinus truncatus =

Species of legume

Lupinus truncatus is a species of lupine known by the common name collared annual lupine.

It is native to the coastal mountain ranges and canyons of Baja California and California as far north as the San Francisco Bay Area. It grows in slope habitat such as chaparral and woodland, including areas that have recently burned.

== Description ==
Lupinus truncatus is an annual herb growing no more than 0.5 metres (1.6 ft) tall. Each palmate leaf is made up of 5 to 8 narrow linear leaflets measuring 2 to 4 centimeters in length and just a few millimeters wide. The leaflets usually have truncate tips, or tips that appear sharply cut off and squared, the characteristic that gives the plant its species name.

The inflorescence is a raceme of widely spaced flowers each roughly a centimeter long. The flower is magenta or reddish purple in color with a yellowish or magenta patch on its banner.

The fruit is a hairy legume pod about 3 centimeters long and half a centimeter wide.

== See also ==
- California chaparral and woodlands
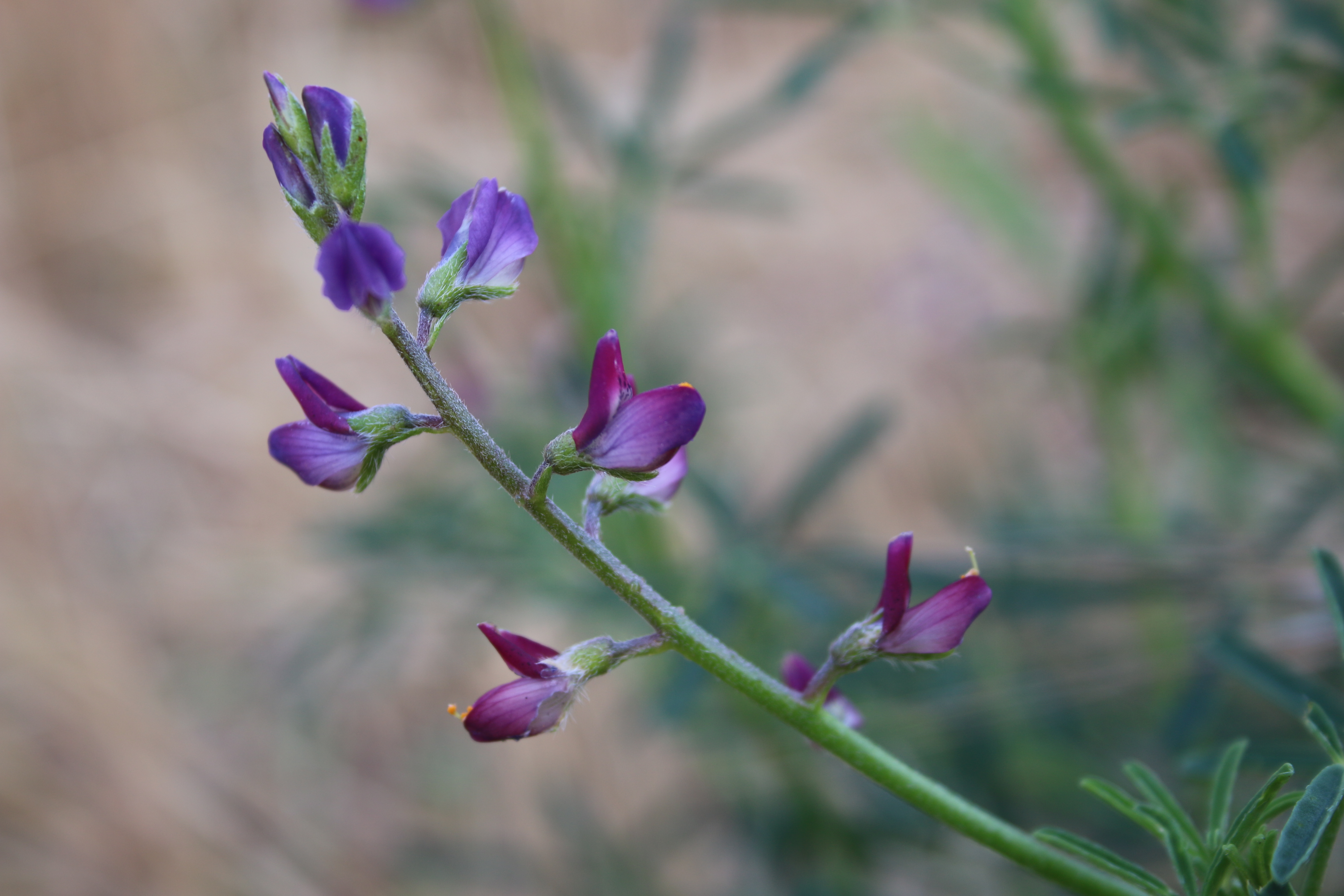
- Lupinus truncatus
