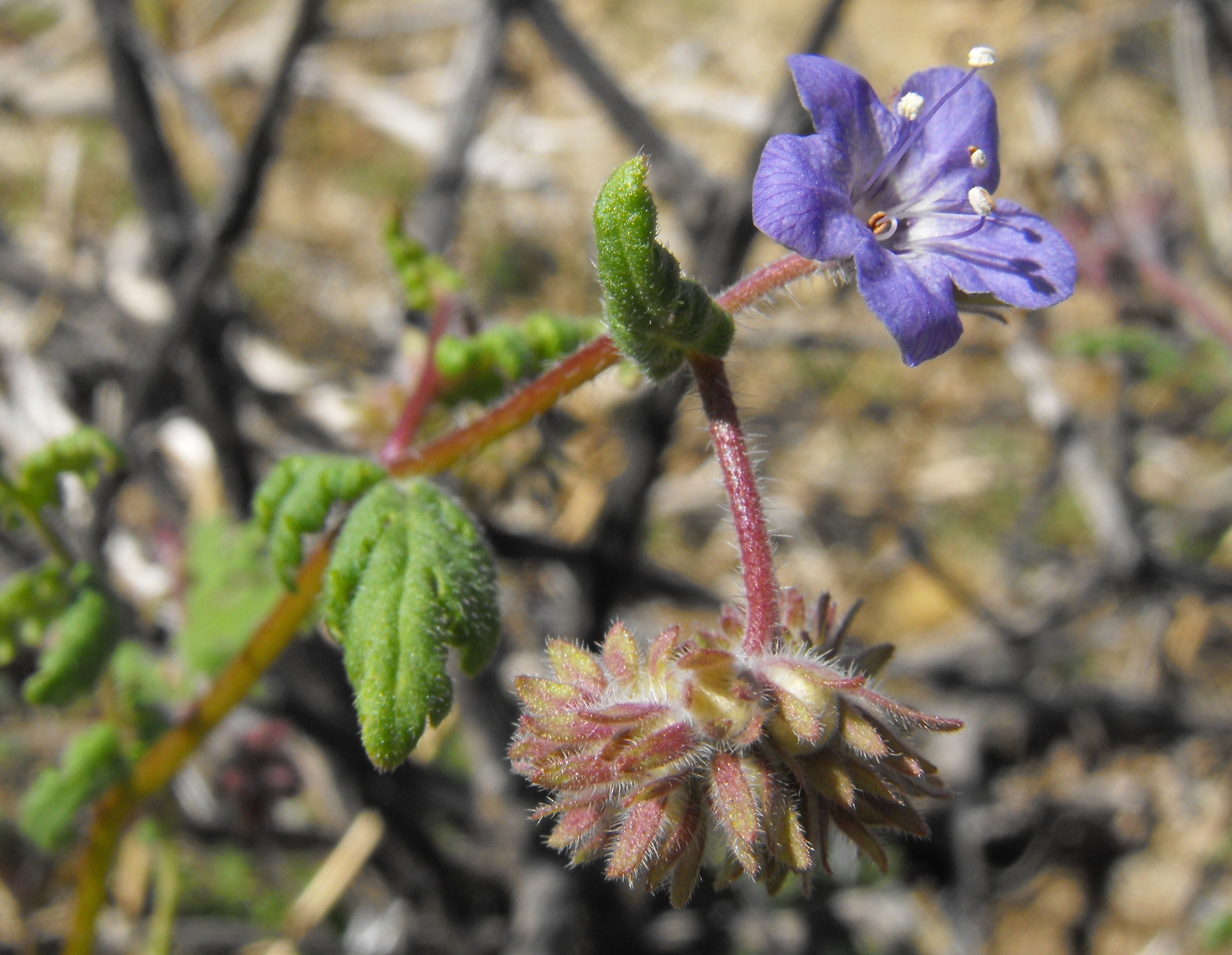

Conservation status
- Secure (NatureServe)

Scientific classification
- Kingdom: Plantae
- Clade: Tracheophytes
- Clade: Angiosperms
- Clade: Eudicots
- Clade: Asterids
- Order: Boraginales
- Family: Hydrophyllaceae
- Genus: Phacelia
- Species: P. distans

Binomial name
- Phacelia distans Benth.

Synonyms
- Phacelia cinerea

= Phacelia distans =

Species of plant

Phacelia distans is a species of flowering plant in the family Hydrophyllaceae, known by the common names distant phacelia and distant scorpionweed. It is native to the southwestern United States and northwestern Mexico, where it grows in many types of habitat, including forest, woodland, chaparral, grassland, and meadows.

== Description ==
Phacelia distans is a variable annual herb growing decumbent to erect, its branching or unbranched stem 15 to 80 centimeters in length. It is usually glandular and coated in soft or stiff hairs. The leaves are up to 10 to 15 centimeters long and are divided into several lobed leaflets, sometimes intricately. The hairy, glandular inflorescence is a one-sided curving or coiling cyme of many funnel- or bell-shaped flowers. The flower is just under a centimeter long and may be white or varying shades of blue or purple.
