= Thinker =

Thinker or The Thinker may refer to:

== Sculpture ==
- The Thinker, a bronze sculpture by Auguste Rodin, 1904
- Karditsa Thinker, Neolithic clay figurine at the National Archaeological Museum of Athens, dating to 4500–3300 B.C.
- Thinker from Yehud, Middle Bronze Age II Palestine clay figurine at the Israel Museum, dating to c. 1800–1600 B.C.
- Thinker of Hamangia, ancient Neolithic figurine associated with the Hamangia culture, dating to c. 5000 B.C.

== Other media ==
- The Thinker: Portrait of Louis N. Kenton, a 1900 oil painting by Thomas Eakins
- Thinker (DC Comics), five telepathic supervillains
- The Thinker?, a 1981 Indian environmental short animated film by A. R. Sen, winner of the National Film Award for Best Non-Feature Animation Film

== Other uses ==
- The Thinker (horse) (1978–1991), an Irish–British racehorse
- Ulmus parvifolia 'The Thinker', a Chinese elm cultivar

== See also ==
- Mad Thinker, a robotics genius supervillain in the fictional Marvel Universe
- Thinking
