= Thinker of Hamangia =

Hamangia culture clay figurine

- Thinker of Cernavodă; The Thinker and the Sitting Woman
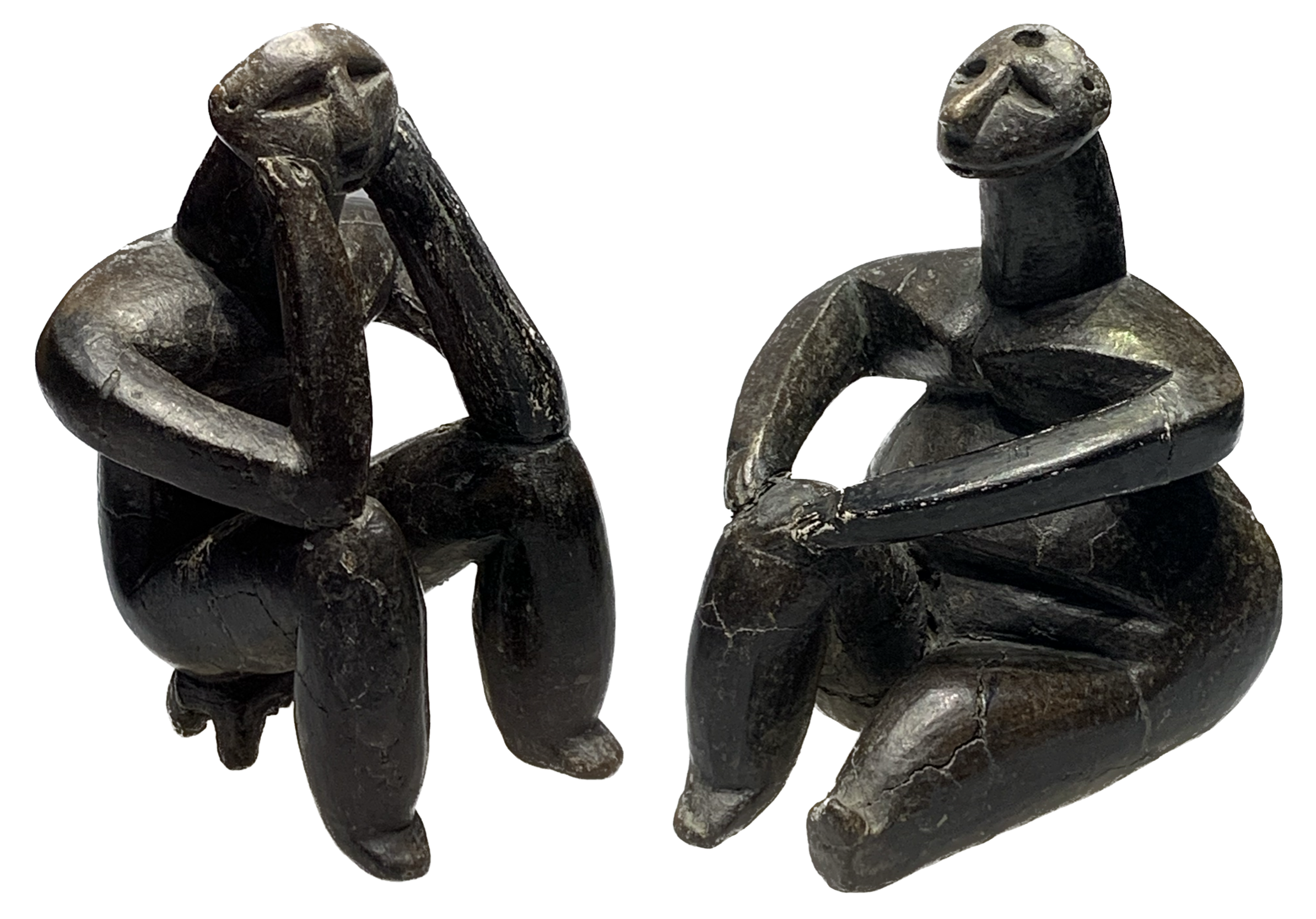
- Material: Fired clay
- Height: 115 millimetres (4.5 in)
- Width: 75 millimetres (3.0 in)
- Period/culture: Late Neolithic, 5000 BC
- Discovered: 1956 near Cernavodă, Romania
- Present location: National History Museum of Romania, Bucharest
- Identification: 15906
- Culture: Hamangia culture
- The Thinker

The Thinker of Hamangia (Romanian: Gânditorul de la Hamangia), also known as Thinker of Cernavodă or collectively The Thinker and the Sitting Woman, is an archaeological artefact, specifically a terracotta sculpture. This ancient Neolithic figurine is believed to date back to the Hamangia culture, which existed in what is now Romania around 5,000 BC. The Thinker sculpture represents a seated figure, often interpreted as a thinker or philosopher due to its contemplative posture.

== Discovery ==
Around 5000 BC, in what we now know as Dobruja, Romania, the Western Black Sea region became home to early human communities. These settlers embarked on a lengthy journey originating in Anatolia and are commonly referred to by archaeologists as the Hamangia culture, named after the location where their remains were first discovered. They brought with them their distinctive black polished pottery and long-necked figurines.

Unearthed in 1956 near Cernavodă, in southeastern Romania, these ceramic figures were discovered within a vast cemetery belonging to the Hamangia culture. This culture had a tradition of burying their deceased in designated areas known as necropolises, often accompanied by funerary items such as pottery, seashells, gold objects, and figurines like The Thinker. The Thinker and its companion, The Sitting Woman, were found within a necropolis containing approximately 400 graves.

The Thinker figurine is made of fired clay and depicts a person seated with their chin resting on both hands, suggesting deep contemplation. The figurine is 4.5 inches (11 cm) tall. This posture unmistakably conveys a meditative disposition, which led to its name, The Thinker, drawing inspiration from Rodin's renowned sculpture of a similar name. The recent finding of the "thinking" man seems to argue for the existence of a developed ideology of some type in this period, while it is impossible not to refer us to similar timeless types, such as the Karditsa Thinker of the Neolithic era, Thinker from Yehud of the Middle Bronze Age II, or even to the Pensive Christ in modern times.

The Sitting Woman, on the other hand, assumes a contemplative posture by placing both hands on a single leg while sitting directly on the ground, without the use of a chair. Her left leg extends outward, her right leg is bent, her hips are distinctly delineated, and her facial expression is equally evocative.

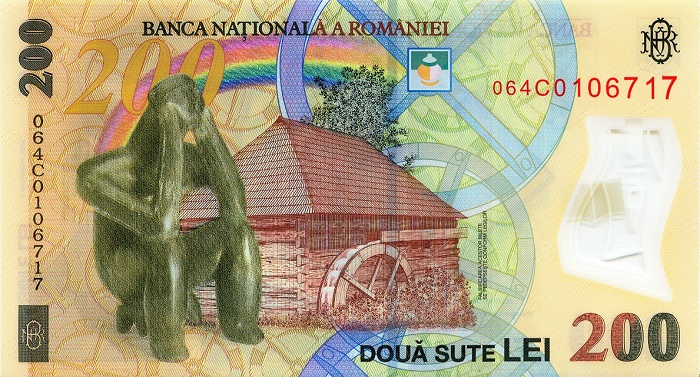
Back of the 200 lei banknote of the Romanian leu featuring The Thinker

These artefacts stand out remarkably from contemporary artwork. Typically, ancient art from pre-literate societies tends to depict themes like hunting and fertility, often featuring faceless female Venus figurines with exaggerated buttocks and breasts. In striking contrast, these figurines radiate vitality and deep emotion. Some archaeologists have proposed a connection between the figure and contemplation of life and death, particularly given its discovery in a cemetery. The Thinker is featured on the back of the 200 lei banknote of the Romanian leu since 2006.

Since 2005, The Thinker and The Sitting Woman are on display at the National History Museum of Romania in Bucharest. In 2019, Neolithic figurines from the Hamangia Culture, (5000-4600 BCE) including The Thinker and The Sitting Woman were exhibited at Curtius Museum in the Liège during Europalia.

== Gallery ==
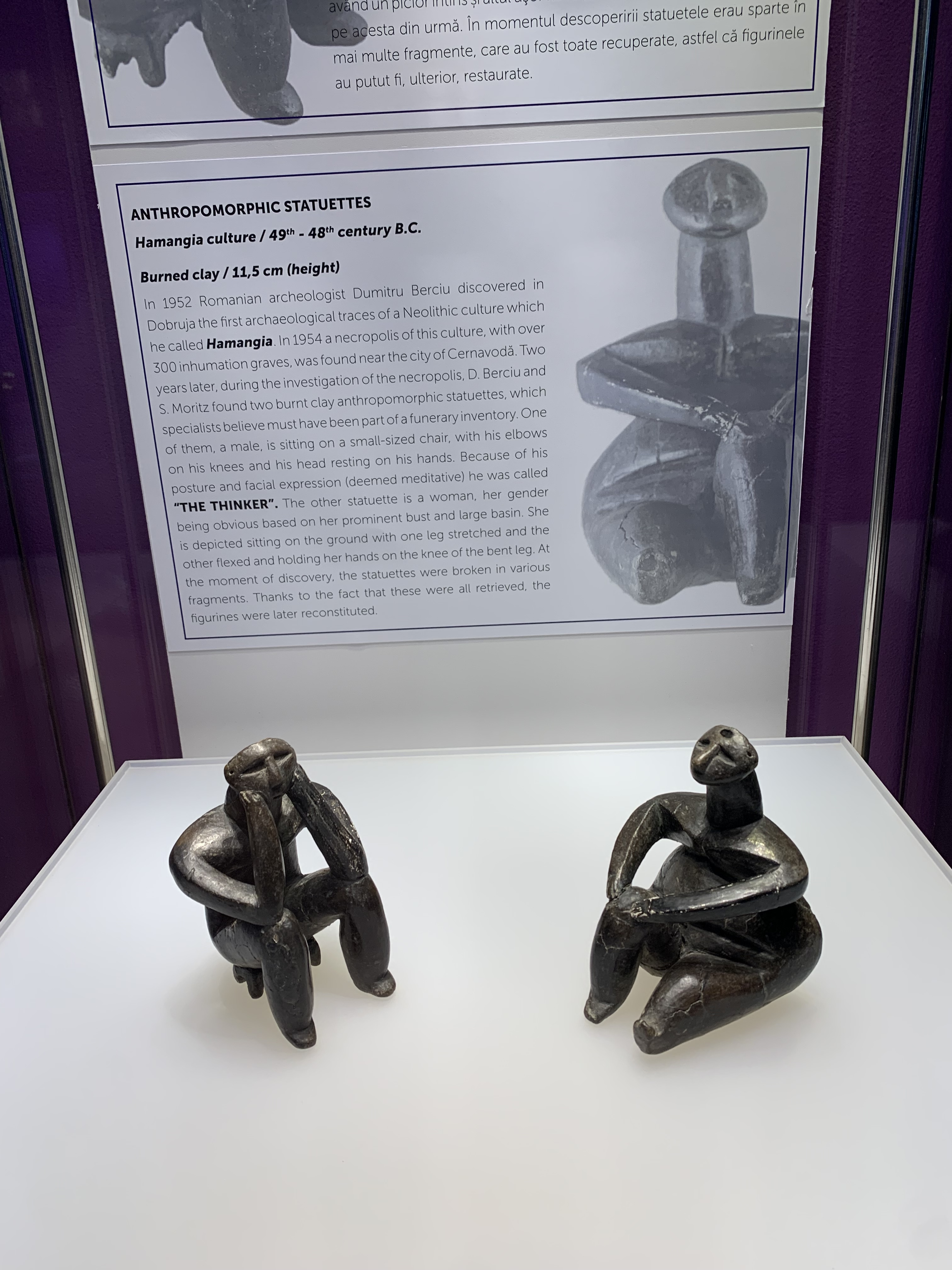
Museum display

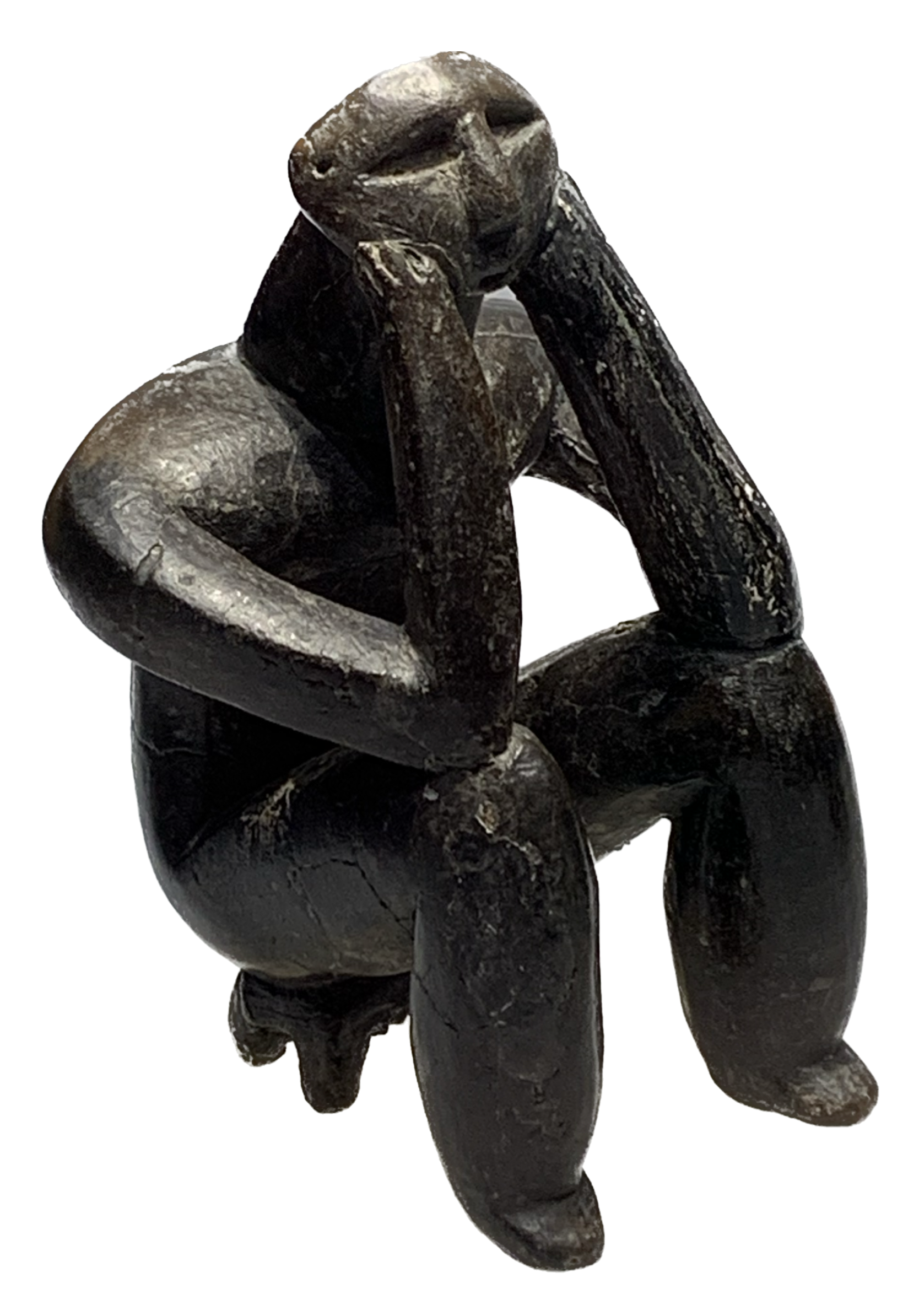
Male figurine, "The Thinker"

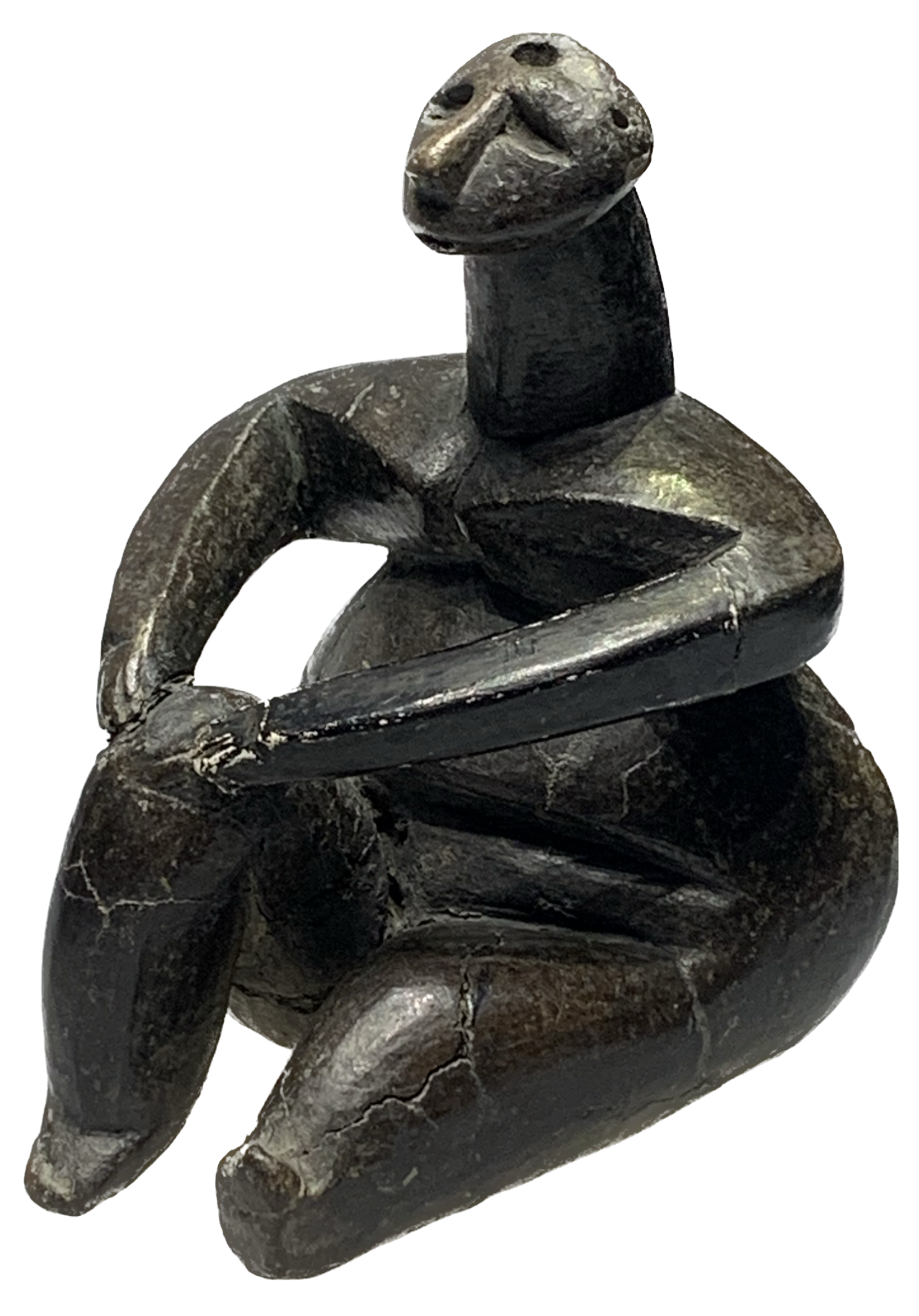
Female figurine, "The Sitting Woman"
