= C21H21NO6 =

The molecular formula C_{21}H_{21}NO_{6} (molar mass: 383.39 g/mol, exact mass: 383.1369 u) may refer to:

- Hydrastine
- Rhoeadine (rheadine)
