= Hermann Linde the Elder =

Hermann Linde (7 October 1831, Crossen an der Oder – 11 December 1918, Lübeck) was a German pharmacist and early photographer. He is generally referred to as The Elder to distinguish him from his son, Hermann, who was a painter.

== Life and work ==
In 1853, after six years of wandering throughout Germany, he settled in Lübeck and became an assistant in the pharmacy operated by Franz Friedrich Kindt, a well known naturalist. In 1860. he married Katinka Stolle, daughter of the painter, Christian Peter Wilhelm Stolle. They had eight children, including Max Linde, an ophthalmologist and art collector, Heinrich Eduard Linde-Walther, a painter, and Hermann Linde, also a painter, who specialized in Orientalist scenes.

In 1859, he became a member of the Freemasons lodge, "Zum Füllhorn" (cornucopia) and, in 1880, succeeded the politician, Heinrich Gustav Pitt as its Grand Master; holding that office until 1889. During his term, the new Logenhaus was constructed. He was also active in the Society for the Promotion of Charitable Activities, and served on the Lübeck Bürgerschaft (city council) from 1883 to 1895.

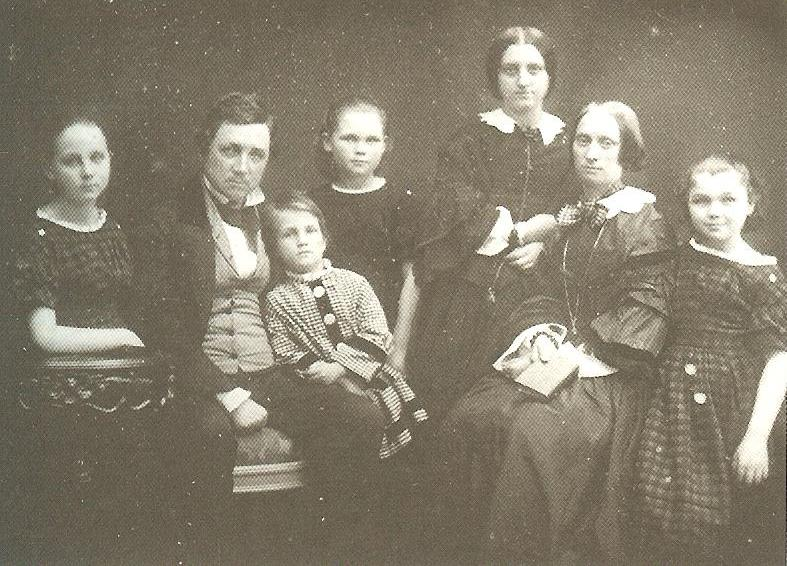
William Henry Newman-Sherwood and his family; daguerreotype (1855)

=== Photography ===
As early as 1852, inspired by the work of Louis Daguerre, he built his own camera obscura and experimented with it. It was made out of cardboard, with a magnifying glass, and he prepared the collodion himself, using ammonium iodide and ammoniuam bromide. He received his first actual camera from his employer's younger brother, Georg Christian Kindt.

In 1855, he and David Eichmann, a student of Joseph Wilhelm Pero, opened a photographic studio they called the "Photographisches Institut". Linde took over full control of the company when Eichmann went to Hamburg in 1858.

His reputation rested primarily on portrait photographs. His clients included members of the Mann family, Emanuel Geibel and Fritz Reuter.

He was the city's most popular photographer for several decades. He retired from the business in 1891, due to increasing competition.

== Sources ==
- Hermann Linde: Erinnerungen aus meinem Leben. Lübeck, 1915, privately published.
- Stefan Pucks: "Linde, Hermann" in: Biographisches Lexikon für Schleswig-Holstein und Lübeck, Vol.11, Neumünster, 2000, pp. 226–227 ISBN 3-529-02640-9
- Alexander Bastek, Jan Zimmermann (Eds.): Fotografie in Lübeck 1840–1945. Imhof, Petersberg, 2016 ISBN 978-3-7319-0366-6
