= Christian Peter Wilhelm Stolle =

German decorative painter

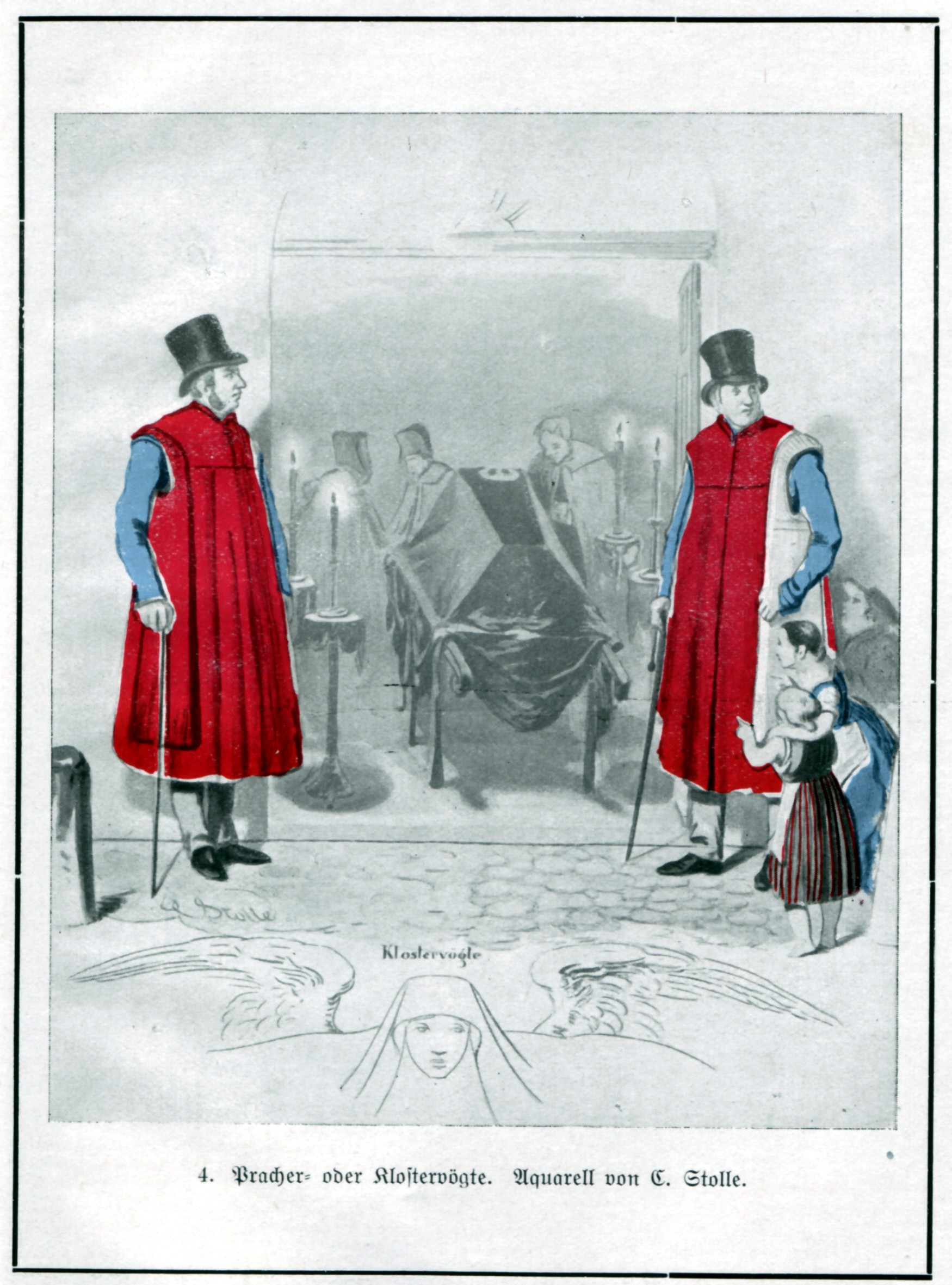
Official costumes: Monastery stewards

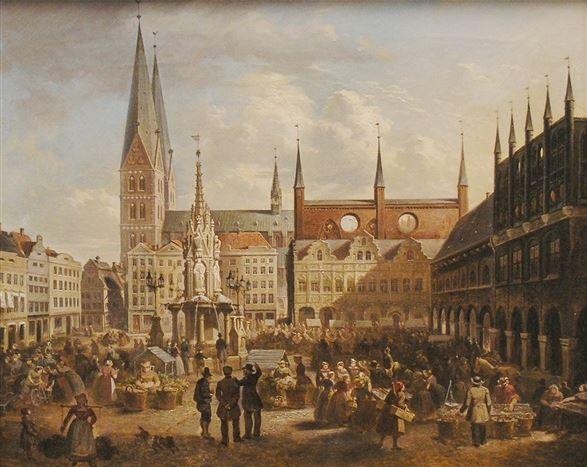
Market Day at the Lübeck Marketplace

Christian Peter Wilhelm Stolle (18 October 1810, Lübeck - 11 September 1887, Lübeck) was a German decorative painter.

== Life and work ==
He was born to the decorative painter, Johann Wilhelm Stolle (1780–1838) and his wife, Magdalena Catharina Henriette, née Wulff (1787–1816). After a stay at the Katharineum, from 1824 to 1827, he was apprenticed to his father. He became a Journeyman in 1832. The following year, he continued his studies at the Dresden Academy of Fine Arts, where his primary instructors were Gustav Heinrich Naecke and Carl August Richter.

Toward the end of 1834, he returned to Lübeck and worked in his father's studio. Three years later, his father became seriously ill, and he took over the business. In 1838, he was certified as a Master by the local artists' guild. He operated the studio until his retirement in 1884. During this time, he was active in the Society for the Promotion of Charitable Activities, as an honorary member.

Also in 1838, he married Charlotte Wilhelmine Christine, née Gloy (1811–1881). They had one son and two daughters. Their daughter, Katinka, married the photographer, Hermann Linde and they had eight children, including Max Linde, an ophthalmologist and art collector, Heinrich Eduard Linde-Walther, and Hermann Linde; both of whom were painters.

Although mostly a room painter, he worked on restorations as well; notably, the hall in the church at the Holy Ghost Hospital (1866). Many of sketches and watercolors are of documentary value; depicting buildings and traditional modes of dress that have since disappeared.

== Sources ==
- Adolf Linde: "Christian Peter Wilhelm Stolle, ein Lübecker Malermeister". In: Der Wagen, 1940, pp. 141–154.
- Gustav Lindtke: Alte Lübecker Stadtansichten, Lübecker Museumshefte, Vol.7, 1968, pg.107.
- Wulf Schadendorf: Museum Behnhaus. Das Haus und seine Räume. Malerei, Skulptur, Kunsthandwerk, Museum für Kunst und Kulturgeschichte der Hansestadt, Lübeck 1976, pg.119.
- Alken Bruns: "Stolle, Peter Christian Wilhelm". In: Neue Lübecker Lebensläufe. Wacholtz, Neumünster 2009, ISBN 978-3-529-01338-6, pp. 572–575.
- "Stolle, Christian Peter Wilhelm". In: Hans Vollmer (Ed.): Allgemeines Lexikon der Bildenden Künstler von der Antike bis zur Gegenwart, Vol.32: Stephens–Theodotos. E. A. Seemann, Leipzig 1938, pg.105.
