= Two hundred lei =

- Country: Romania
- Value: 200 Romanian leu
- Width: 150 mm
- Height: 82 mm
- Security features: watermark, security thread, transparent window, microprinting, blacklight printing, micro perforations, latent writing, EURion constellation
- Material used: polymer
- Years of printing: since 2006

Obverse
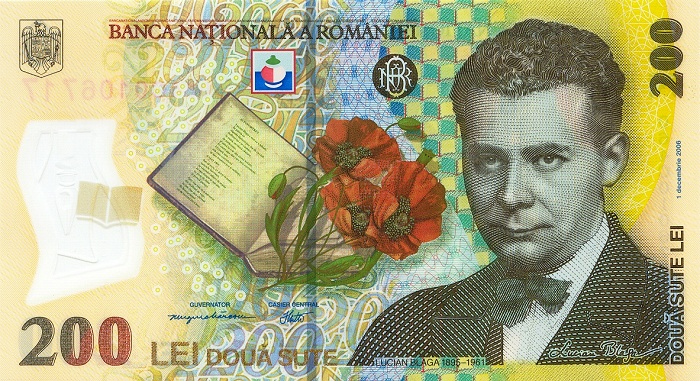
- Design: Lucian Blaga, poppy, a poem of Blaga in a book
- Designer: National Bank of Romania
- Design date: 2006

Reverse
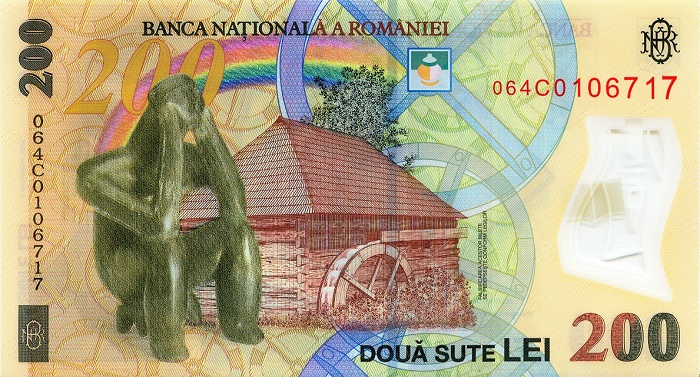
- Design: A watermill and the Thinker of Hamangia
- Designer: National Bank of Romania
- Design date: 2006

The two hundred lei banknote is one of the circulating denomination of the Romanian leu.

The main color of the banknote is orange. It pictures, on the obverse a poet, Lucian Blaga, and on the reverse a watermill and a figurine known in Romania as the Thinker of Hamangia (Romanian: Gânditorul de la Hamangia).

== History ==
In the past, the denomination was also in the coin form, as follows:

First leu (1867–1947)

- coin issues: 1942, 1945

Image	Value	Technical parameters			Description			Date of		
Image	Value	Diameter	Mass	Composition	Edge	Obverse	Reverse	first minting	withdrawal	lapse
	200 lei	24 mm	6 g	silver 0.835			"MIHAI I REGELE ROMANILOR" ("Michael I of Romania King of Romania"), effigy of the King	1942		
	200 lei	27 mm	7.5 g	brass		wreath, crown on top, denomination in the middle	"MIHAI I REGELE ROMANILOR" ("Michael I of Romania King of Romania"), effigy of the King	1945		
These images are to scale at 2.5 pixels per millimetre. For table standards, see the coin specification table.

Second leu (1947–1952)

- no issues

Third leu - ROL (1952–2005)

- banknote issue: 1992

1992 Series
Image		Value	Dimensions	Main Colour	Description		Date of	
Obverse	Reverse	Value	Dimensions	Main Colour	Obverse	Reverse	printing	withdrawal
		200 L	155 × 76 mm	Light brown	Grigore Antipa	Danube Delta	December 1992	April 1999
These images are to scale at 0.7 pixel per millimetre (18 pixel per inch). For table standards, see the banknote specification table.

Fourth leu - RON (since 2005)

- banknote issue: 2006

2005 Series
Image		Value	Dimensions	Printing Technique	Main Colour	Description		Date of	
Obverse	Reverse	Value	Dimensions	Printing Technique	Main Colour	Obverse	Reverse	Printing	Issue
		200 L	150 × 82 mm	Intaglio	Brown, orange	Lucian Blaga, poppies	A watermill and the Thinker of Hamangia	2006–present	1 December 2006
These images are to scale at 0.7 pixel per millimetre (18 pixel per inch). For table standards, see the banknote specification table.
