= Papaver rhoeas =

Scientific classification
- Kingdom: Plantae
- Clade: Tracheophytes
- Clade: Angiosperms
- Clade: Eudicots
- Order: Ranunculales
- Family: Papaveraceae
- Genus: Papaver
- Species: P. rhoeas

Binomial name
- Papaver rhoeas L.

Synonyms
- Papaver commutatum Fisch., C.A.Mey. & Trautv.; Papaver insignitum Jord.; Papaver intermedium Becker; Papaver rhoeas var. strigosum Boenn.; Papaver rhoeas subsp. strigosum Simonk.; Papaver roubiaei Vig.; Papaver strigosum Schur; Papaver tenuissimum Fedde; Papaver trilobum Wallr.; Papaver tumidulum Klokov

Species of flowering plant in the poppy family

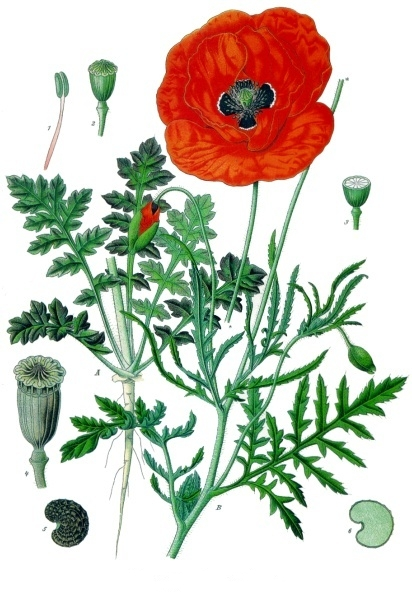
Illustration

Papaver rhoeas, with common names including common poppy, corn poppy, corn rose, field poppy, Flanders poppy, red poppy, and Odai, is an annual herbaceous species of flowering plant in the poppy family Papaveraceae. It is native to north Africa and temperate Eurasia and is introduced into temperate areas on all other continents except Antarctica.

It is regarded as an agricultural weed (hence the common names including "corn" and "field"). As the plant thrives in areas of disturbed soil, it was often abundant in agricultural fields before the advent of herbicides. Flushes of poppies may still appear in fields where herbicides are not used, as well as those in fallow. The corn poppy and its cultivars such as the Shirley poppy are widely grown in gardens, and are frequently found in packets of seed labelled "wildflower mixes". Since World War I, it has been used in the Commonwealth as a symbol of remembrance for fallen soldiers because it commonly grew in fields disturbed by war.

== Description ==
Papaver rhoeas is a variable, erect annual, forming a long-lived soil seed bank that can germinate when the soil is disturbed. In the Northern Hemisphere it generally flowers in late spring (between May and October in the UK) but if the weather is warm enough other flowers frequently appear at the beginning of autumn. It grows up to about 70 centimetres (28 inches) in height. The stems hold single flowers, which are large and showy, 5–10 cm (2–4 in) across, with four petals that are vivid red, most commonly with a black spot at their base. The petals slightly overlap each other. The plant can produce up to 400 flowers in a warm season, that last only one day. The flower stem is usually covered with coarse hairs that are held at right angles to the surface, helping to distinguish it from P. dubium in which the hairs are more usually appressed (i.e. held close to the stem). The capsules are hairless, obovoid (egg-shaped), less than twice as tall as they are wide, with a stigma at least as wide as the capsule. Like many other species of Papaver, the plant exudes white to yellowish latex when the tissues are broken.

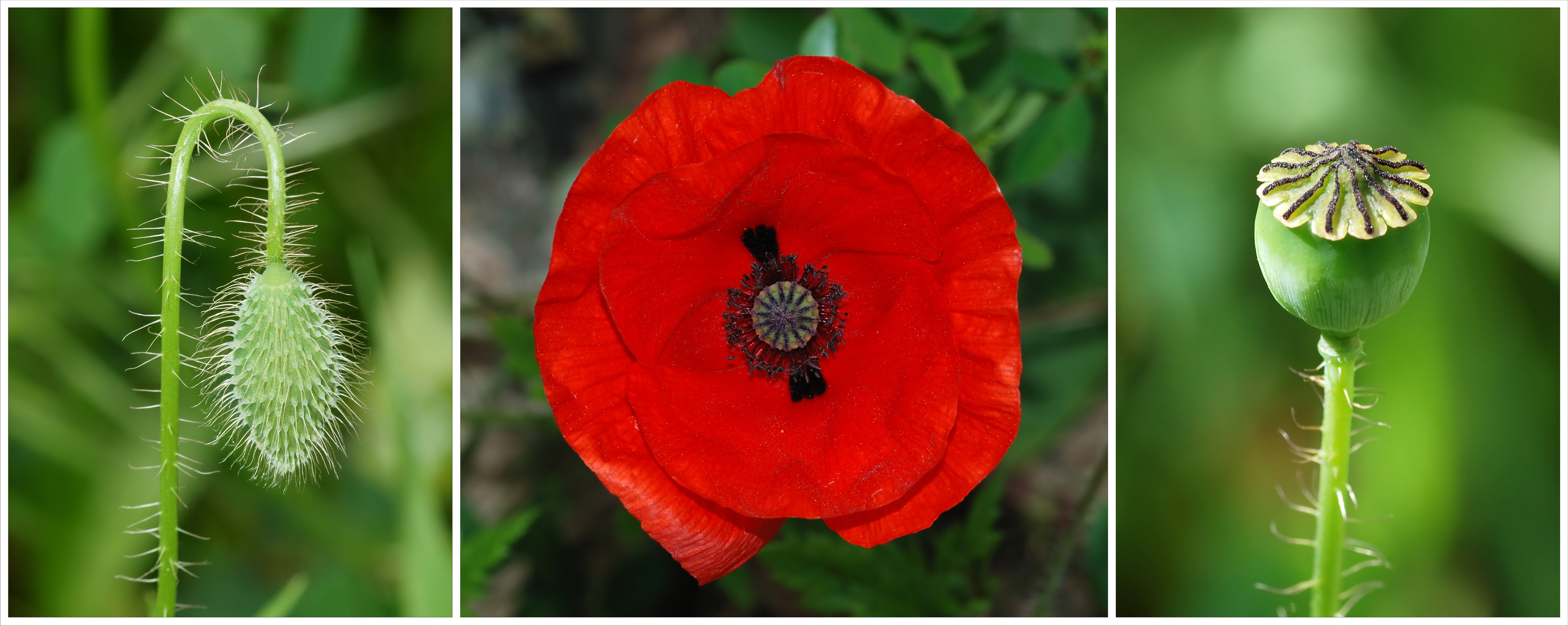
The three stages in a common poppy flower: bud, flower, and capsule

Not all corn poppies that are available commercially have red flowers. Selective breeding has resulted in cultivars in yellow, orange, pink, and white. The Shirley poppy is a well-known cultivar. A very pale speckled variety, derived from the Shirley, is also available.

A nearly black-flowering hybrid, known as 'Evelina', was bred in Italy in the late 1990s, with P. dubium, but does not appear to be available commercially.

=== Phytochemistry ===
Papaver rhoeas contains the alkaloid called rhoeadine, which is a mild sedative. Rhoeadic acid, papaveric acid and rhoeagenine are also found in this plant.

== Taxonomy ==
It was formally described by the Swedish botanist Carl Linnaeus in his seminal publication Species Plantarum in 1753. Papaver is the Latin word for poppy and rhoeas means the corn poppy in Greek. It is classified within the genus Papaver as part of the family Papaveraceae and has two subspecies and one variety that are listed as accepted by Plants of the World Online.

- Papaver rhoeas var. himerense
  This variety was described by Francesco Maria Raimondo and Vivienne Spadaro in 2007. It is endemic to the island of Sicily.
- Papaver rhoeas subsp. polytrichum
  This subspecies was described as a species named Papaver polytrichum by Pierre Edmond Boissier and Theodor Kotschy in 1856. It was reclassified as a subspecies of Papaver rhoeas by Joseph Thiébaut in 1936. It is native to the eastern Mediterranean.
- Papaver rhoeas subsp. rhoeas
  The autonymic subspecies is native to Europe, North Africa, and western Asia and has been introduced to many other parts of the world.

Papaver rhoeas has 126 synonyms of the species or one of its two subspecies.

Table of Synonyms
Name	Year	Rank	Synonym of:	Notes
Papaver aegadicum Lojac.	1906	species	subsp. rhoeas	= het.
Papaver agrivagum Jord.	1861	species	subsp. rhoeas	= het.
Papaver ameristophyllum Fedde	1909	species	subsp. rhoeas	= het.
Papaver anisotrichum Wein	1911	species	subsp. rhoeas	= het.
Papaver arvaticum Jord.	1861	species	subsp. rhoeas	= het.
Papaver arvense Salisb.	1796	species	subsp. rhoeas	= het., nom. illeg.
Papaver atropurpureum Gilib.	1782	species	subsp. rhoeas	= het., opus utique oppr.
Papaver balanocarpum Wein	1911	species	subsp. rhoeas	= het.
Papaver caespitosum Fedde	1909	species	subsp. rhoeas	= het.
Papaver caudatifolium Timb.-Lagr.	1870	species	subsp. rhoeas	= het.
Papaver cereale Jord.	1861	species	subsp. rhoeas	= het.
Papaver chanceliae Maire	1914	species	subsp. rhoeas	= het.
Papaver chelidonioides Moss	1920	species	subsp. rhoeas	= het.
Papaver cinerascens Wein	1911	species	subsp. rhoeas	= het.
Papaver commixtum Wein	1911	species	subsp. rhoeas	= het.
Papaver commutatum subsp. euxinum Kadereit	1988	subspecies	subsp. rhoeas	= het.
Papaver cruciatum Jord.	1861	species	subsp. rhoeas	= het.
Papaver dodonei Timb.-Lagr.	1870	species	subsp. rhoeas	= het.
Papaver dubium var. stipitatum E.U.Zając	1985	variety	subsp. rhoeas	= het., without exact basionym page.
Papaver erraticum Jord.	1861	species	subsp. rhoeas	= het., nom. illeg.
Papaver erraticum Gray	1821	species	subsp. rhoeas	= het.
Papaver erucifolium Timb.-Lagr.	1892	species	subsp. rhoeas	= het.
Papaver feddeanum Wein	1911	species	subsp. rhoeas	= het.
Papaver fuchsii Timb.-Lagr.	1870	species	subsp. rhoeas	= het.
Papaver gabrielianae M.V.Agab.	2007	species	subsp. rhoeas	= het.
Papaver graecum Link ex Fedde	1909	species	subsp. rhoeas	= het., not validly publ.
Papaver guerlekense Stapf	1886	species	subsp. rhoeas	= het.
Papaver hookeri Baker ex Hook.f.	1883	species	subsp. rhoeas	= het.
Papaver humifusum Fedde	1905	species	subsp. rhoeas	= het.
Papaver inornatum Schott & Kotschy	1854	species	subsp. polytrichum	= het.
Papaver insignitum Jord.	1861	species	subsp. rhoeas	= het.
Papaver integrifolium Vig.	1814	species	subsp. rhoeas	= het.
Papaver interjectum Wein	1911	species	subsp. rhoeas	= het.
Papaver intermedium Becker	1827	species	subsp. rhoeas	= het.
Papaver montenegrinum (Rohlena) A.W.Hill	1926	species	subsp. rhoeas	= het.
Papaver omphalodeum Wein	1911	species	subsp. rhoeas	= het.
Papaver osswaldii Wein	1911	species	subsp. rhoeas	= het.
Papaver paucisetum Wein	1911	species	subsp. rhoeas	= het.
Papaver polytrichum Boiss. & Kotschy	1856	species	subsp. polytrichum	≡ hom.
Papaver propinquum Wein	1911	species	subsp. rhoeas	= het.
Papaver pseudohaussknechtii Fedde	1909	species	subsp. rhoeas	= het.
Papaver rapiferum Fedde	1905	species	subsp. rhoeas	= het.
Papaver rhoeas var. agrivagum (Jord.) Rouy & Foucaud	1893	variety	subsp. rhoeas	= het.
Papaver rhoeas var. agrivagum (Jord.) Beck	1890	variety	subsp. rhoeas	= het.
Papaver rhoeas var. albiflorum Kuntze	1887	variety	subsp. rhoeas	= het.
Papaver rhoeas var. albomarginatum Kuntze	1887	variety	subsp. rhoeas	= het.
Papaver rhoeas var. alleizettei Maire	1923	variety	subsp. rhoeas	= het.
Papaver rhoeas var. arvaticum (Jord.) Rouy & Foucaud	1893	variety	subsp. rhoeas	= het.
Papaver rhoeas var. bipinnatifidum N.H.F.Desp.	1838	variety	subsp. rhoeas	= het.
Papaver rhoeas subsp. caudatifolium (Timb.-Lagr.) P.Fourn.	1928	subspecies	subsp. rhoeas	= het.
Papaver rhoeas proles caudatifolium (Timb.-Lagr.) Rouy & Foucaud	1893	proles	subsp. rhoeas	= het.
Papaver rhoeas var. chanceliae (Maire) Maire	1921	variety	subsp. rhoeas	= het.
Papaver rhoeas var. chinense Elkan	1839	variety	subsp. rhoeas	= het.
Papaver rhoeas var. conicum Legrand	1873	variety	subsp. rhoeas	= het.
Papaver rhoeas var. cornuti H.Hoffm. ex Kuntze	1887	variety	subsp. rhoeas	= het.
Papaver rhoeas var. cruciatum (Jord.) Rouy & Foucaud	1893	variety	subsp. rhoeas	= het.
Papaver rhoeas f. cruciatum P.D.Sell	2018	form	subsp. rhoeas	= het., contrary to Art. 41.8.(a) ICN (2012)
Papaver rhoeas f. dentatopinnatifidum Kuntze	1887	form	subsp. rhoeas	= het.
Papaver rhoeas f. dentatopinnatifidum Kuntze	1887	form	subsp. rhoeas	= het.
Papaver rhoeas var. erraticum (Jord.) Rouy & Foucaud	1893	variety	subsp. rhoeas	= het.
Papaver rhoeas var. erucifolium (Timb.-Lagr.) Rouy & Foucaud	1893	variety	subsp. rhoeas	= het.
Papaver rhoeas var. erythrotrichum Fedde	1909	variety	subsp. rhoeas	= het.
Papaver rhoeas f. erythrotrichum (Fedde) P.D.Sell	2018	form	subsp. rhoeas	= het.
Papaver rhoeas var. giganteum Caldesi	1879	variety	subsp. rhoeas	= het.
Papaver rhoeas var. glabellum Elkan	1839	variety	subsp. rhoeas	= het.
Papaver rhoeas var. glabrescens H.Lindb.	1906	variety	subsp. rhoeas	= het.
Papaver rhoeas var. globosum Dumort. ex Lej. & Courtois	1831	variety	subsp. rhoeas	= het.
Papaver rhoeas var. hispidissimum Gaudin	1828	variety	subsp. rhoeas	= het.
Papaver rhoeas var. hoffmanianum Kuntze	1887	variety	subsp. rhoeas	= het.
Papaver rhoeas f. hoffmanianum (Kuntze) P.D.Sell	2018	form	subsp. rhoeas	= het.
Papaver rhoeas var. hookeri (Baker ex Hook.f.) Fedde	1909	variety	subsp. rhoeas	= het.
Papaver rhoeas subsp. humile Holmboe	1914	subspecies	subsp. rhoeas	= het.
Papaver rhoeas var. immaculatum Kuntze	1887	variety	subsp. rhoeas	= het.
Papaver rhoeas subsp. insignitum (Jord.) P.Fourn.	1928	subspecies	subsp. rhoeas	= het.
Papaver rhoeas proles insignitum (Jord.) Rouy & Foucaud	1893	proles	subsp. rhoeas	= het.
Papaver rhoeas f. integrifolium (Vig.) Kuntze	1887	form	subsp. rhoeas	= het.
Papaver rhoeas subsp. intermedium (Becker) Kuntze	1887	subspecies	subsp. rhoeas	= het.
Papaver rhoeas proles intermedium (Becker) Rouy & Foucaud	1893	proles	subsp. rhoeas	= het.
Papaver rhoeas var. laciniatum Kuntze	1887	variety	subsp. rhoeas	= het.
Papaver rhoeas var. leucanthum Fedde	1909	variety	subsp. rhoeas	= het.
Papaver rhoeas var. lyratum Caldesi	1879	variety	subsp. rhoeas	= het.
Papaver rhoeas var. montenegrinum Rohlena	1905	variety	subsp. rhoeas	= het.
Papaver rhoeas f. multifidum Kuntze	1887	form	subsp. rhoeas	= het.
Papaver rhoeas subsp. normale Kuntze	1887	subspecies	subsp. rhoeas	= het.
Papaver rhoeas var. oblongatum Boiss.	1867	variety	subsp. rhoeas	= het.
Papaver rhoeas var. ochroleucum Kuntze	1887	variety	subsp. rhoeas	= het.
Papaver rhoeas var. ovale Dumort. ex Lej. & Courtois	1831	variety	subsp. rhoeas	= het.
Papaver rhoeas var. pallidum Gren. & Godr.	1848	variety	subsp. rhoeas	= het.
Papaver rhoeas f. polytrichum (Boiss. & Kotschy) Kuntze	1887	form	subsp. polytrichum	≡ hom.
Papaver rhoeas var. roseum Kuntze	1887	variety	subsp. rhoeas	= het.
Papaver rhoeas var. roubiaei (Vig.) Salis	1834	variety	subsp. rhoeas	= het.
Papaver rhoeas proles roubiei (Vig.) Rouy & Foucaud	1893	proles	subsp. rhoeas	= het.
Papaver rhoeas var. rubromarginatum Kuntze	1887	variety	subsp. rhoeas	= het.
Papaver rhoeas var. segetale (Jord.) Rouy & Foucaud	1893	variety	subsp. rhoeas	= het.
Papaver rhoeas var. serratifolium Rouy & Foucaud	1893	variety	subsp. rhoeas	= het.
Papaver rhoeas f. subbipinnatifidum Kuntze	1887	form	subsp. rhoeas	= het.
Papaver rhoeas f. subbipinnatifidum Kuntze	1887	form	subsp. rhoeas	= het.
Papaver rhoeas f. subintegrum Kuntze	1887	form	subsp. rhoeas	= het., nom. illeg.
Papaver rhoeas var. submamillatum Wein	1973	variety	subsp. rhoeas	= het.
Papaver rhoeas var. tenuifolium Boenn.	1824	variety	subsp. rhoeas	= het.
Papaver rhoeas var. trichocarpum Pamp.	1914	variety	subsp. rhoeas	= het.
Papaver rhoeas var. trifidum (Kuntze) Fedde	1903	variety	subsp. rhoeas	= het.
Papaver rhoeas f. trifidum Kuntze	1887	form	subsp. rhoeas	= het.
Papaver rhoeas var. umbilicatosubstipitatum Fedde	1909	variety	subsp. rhoeas	= het.
Papaver rhoeas var. uniflorum (Balb. ex Spenn.) Kuntze	1887	variety	subsp. rhoeas	= het.
Papaver rhoeas var. urophyllum (Fedde) Maire	1964	variety	subsp. rhoeas	= het.
Papaver rhoeas var. verum Wimm. & Grab.	1829	variety	subsp. rhoeas	= het.
Papaver rhoeas var. vestitum Gren. & Godr.	1848	variety	subsp. rhoeas	= het.
Papaver rhoeas var. violaceum Bréb.	1879	variety	subsp. rhoeas	= het.
Papaver rhoeas var. vulgare Roth	1827	variety	P. rhoeas	≡ hom., not validly publ.
Papaver rhopalothece Stapf	1886	species	subsp. rhoeas	= het.
Papaver robertianella Fedde	1909	species	subsp. rhoeas	= het.
Papaver roubiaei Vig.	1814	species	subsp. rhoeas	= het.
Papaver rumelicum Velen.	1890	species	subsp. rhoeas	= het.
Papaver rusticum Jord.	1861	species	subsp. rhoeas	= het.
Papaver segetale Jord.	1861	species	subsp. rhoeas	= het.
Papaver segetale K.F.Schimp. & Spenn.	1829	species	subsp. rhoeas	= het.
Papaver spurium Wein	1911	species	subsp. rhoeas	= het.
Papaver stipitatum Fedde	1909	species	subsp. rhoeas	= het., nom. illeg.
Papaver × strigosum var. urophyllum Fedde	1909	variety	subsp. rhoeas	= het.
Papaver subumbilicatum Fedde	1909	species	subsp. rhoeas	= het.
Papaver tenuissimum Fedde	1905	species	subsp. rhoeas	= het.
Papaver thaumasiosepalum Fedde	1909	species	subsp. rhoeas	= het.
Papaver tumidulum Klokov	1953	species	subsp. rhoeas	= het.
Papaver umbrosum T.Moore & Mast.	1876	species	subsp. rhoeas	= het.
Papaver uniflorum Balb. ex Spenn.	1829	species	subsp. rhoeas	= het.
Notes: ≡ homotypic synonym ; = heterotypic synonym

=== Natural history ===
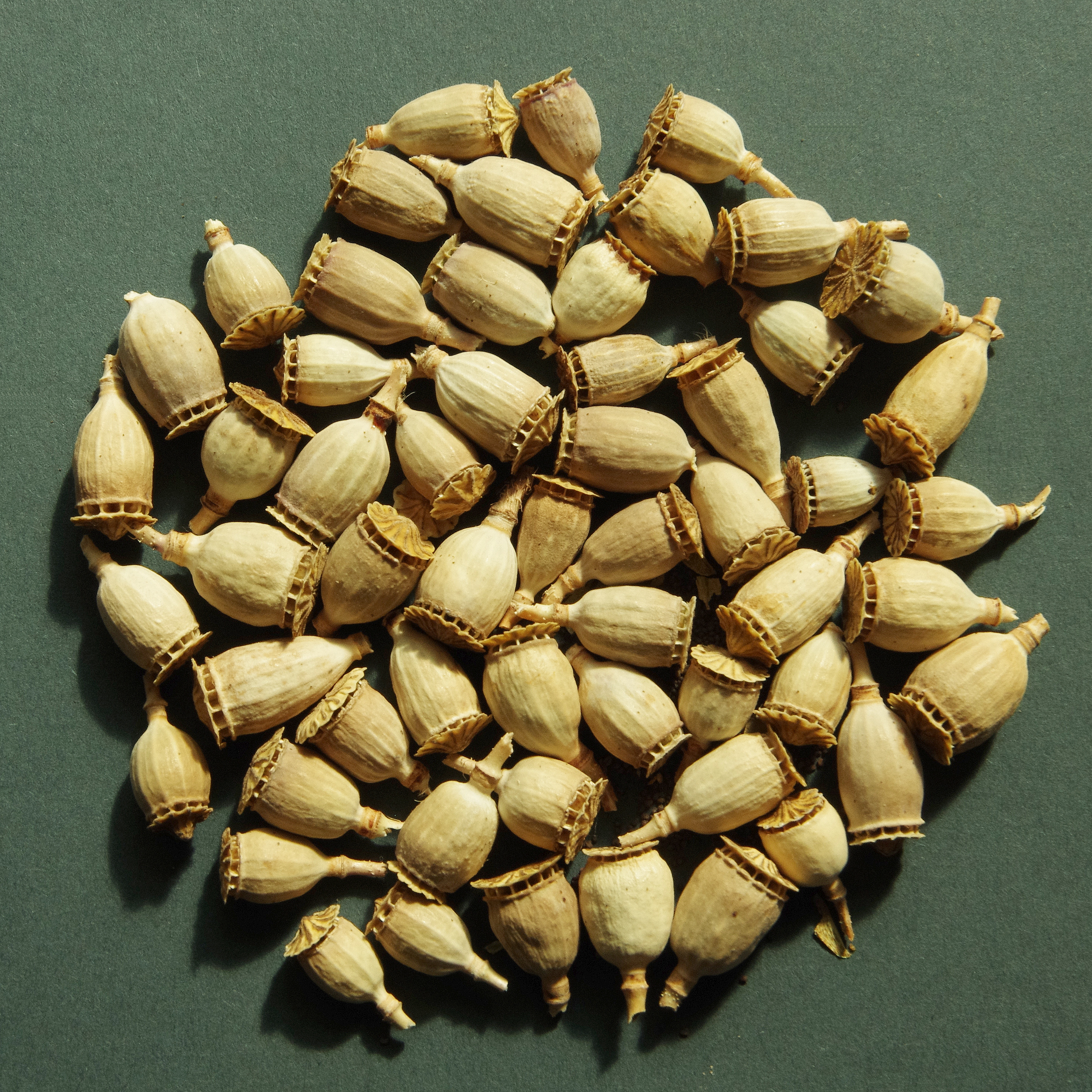
Capsules

Its origin is not known for certain. As with many such plants, the area of origin is often ascribed by Americans to Europe, and by northern Europeans to southern Europe. It is known to have been associated with agriculture in the Old World since early times and has had an old symbolism and association with agricultural fertility. It has most of the characteristics of a successful weed of agriculture. These include an annual lifecycle that fits into that of most cereals, a tolerance of simple weed control methods, the ability to flower and seed itself before the crop is harvested, and the ability to form a long-lived seed bank. The leaves and latex have an acrid taste and are mildly poisonous to grazing animals.

A sterile hybrid with P. dubium is known, P. × hungaricum, that is intermediate in all characteristics with P. rhoeas.

P. rhoeas topped the list in a UK study of meadow pollen production, on a per flower basis, with its rate of 13.3 ± 2.8 μl. The California poppy placed second with a rate of 8.3 ± 1.1 μl. The pollen production of P.rhoeas, on a per flower basis, was very high in comparison with the other plants tested, at almost triple the amount of the top-ranked perennial (a mallow). When sampled at the level of the entire capitulum, however, it was outranked by the ox-eye daisy, Leucanthemum vulgare, with its 15.9 ± 2 μl measurement. It tied with Cosmos bipinnatus. Neither poppy produced a significant quantity of nectar, making their role in meadow ecology specific to pollen-gathering/consuming insects. As poppies are not wind-pollinated, their pollen poses no allergy risk via inhalation.

== Distribution and habitat ==
The species is found within Africa, in Algeria, Egypt, Libya, Morocco, Tunisia, Madeira Islands, and the Canary Islands. Within temperate Asia, it is found in the Caucasus regions of Armenia, Azerbaijan, Georgia, and Ciscaucasia. In Western Asia, it is found in Afghanistan, Cyprus, Egypt, Iran, Iraq, Palestine, Israel, Jordan, Lebanon, Syria and Turkey. Within tropical Asia, it is found in Pakistan and India. Within Europe, it is found in Belarus, Latvia, Lithuania, Moldova, Ukraine, Austria, Belgium, Czech Republic, Germany, Hungary, Netherlands, Poland, Slovakia, Switzerland, Denmark, Ireland, Norway, Sweden, the United Kingdom, Albania, Bosnia and Herzegovina, Bulgaria, Croatia, Greece, Italy, Kosovo, North Macedonia, Montenegro, Romania, Serbia, Slovenia, France, Portugal, and Spain.

It grows in fields, beside roads, and on grasslands. It is hardy to between USDA Zone 8 and Zone 10, or down to 10 °F (−12 °C).

== Uses ==
The commonly grown garden decorative Shirley poppy is a cultivar of this plant.

The black seeds are edible and can be eaten either on their own or as an ingredient in bread, though the majority of poppy seeds harvested for culinary use are from the related species Papaver somniferum. In many Eastern European countries, poppy seeds are boiled in water or milk, and then ground together with honey or sugar to achieve a sweet, soft paste, often used generously in pastries.

The petals contain a red dye which is used in some medicines and wines; also the dried petals are occasionally used to give colour to potpourris.

In traditional folk medicine, it was used for gout, aches, and pains. The petals were used to create a syrup that was fed to children to help them sleep.

== In culture ==
Due to the extent of ground disturbance in warfare during World War I, corn poppies bloomed between the trench lines and no man's lands on the Western front. Poppies are a prominent feature of "In Flanders Fields" by Canadian Lieutenant Colonel John McCrae, one of the most frequently quoted English-language poems composed during the First World War. During the 20th century, the wearing of a poppy at and before Remembrance Day (sometimes known informally as Poppy Day) each year became an established custom in English-speaking western countries. It is also used at some other dates in some countries, such as at appeals for Anzac Day in Australia and New Zealand.

This poppy appears on a number of postage stamps, coins, banknotes, and national flags, including:

- Two hundred lei (Romanian banknote)
- Canadian twenty-dollar note (2012) and Canadian ten-dollar note (2001)
- Some commemorative Canadian twenty-five cent coins in 2004 and 2008
- Great Britain commemorative stamps 2000-2009: 2007 Lest we forget - 90th anniversary of the Battle of the Somme
- New Zealand fifty-cent coin: 2018 - 100th anniversary of Armistice day and the end of WWI

The common or corn poppy was voted the county flower of Essex and Norfolk in 2002 following a poll by the wild plant conservation charity Plantlife.

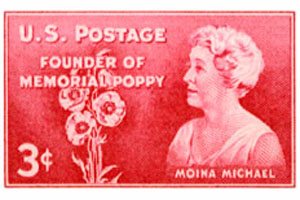
United States commemorative stamp depicting Moina Michael and corn poppies

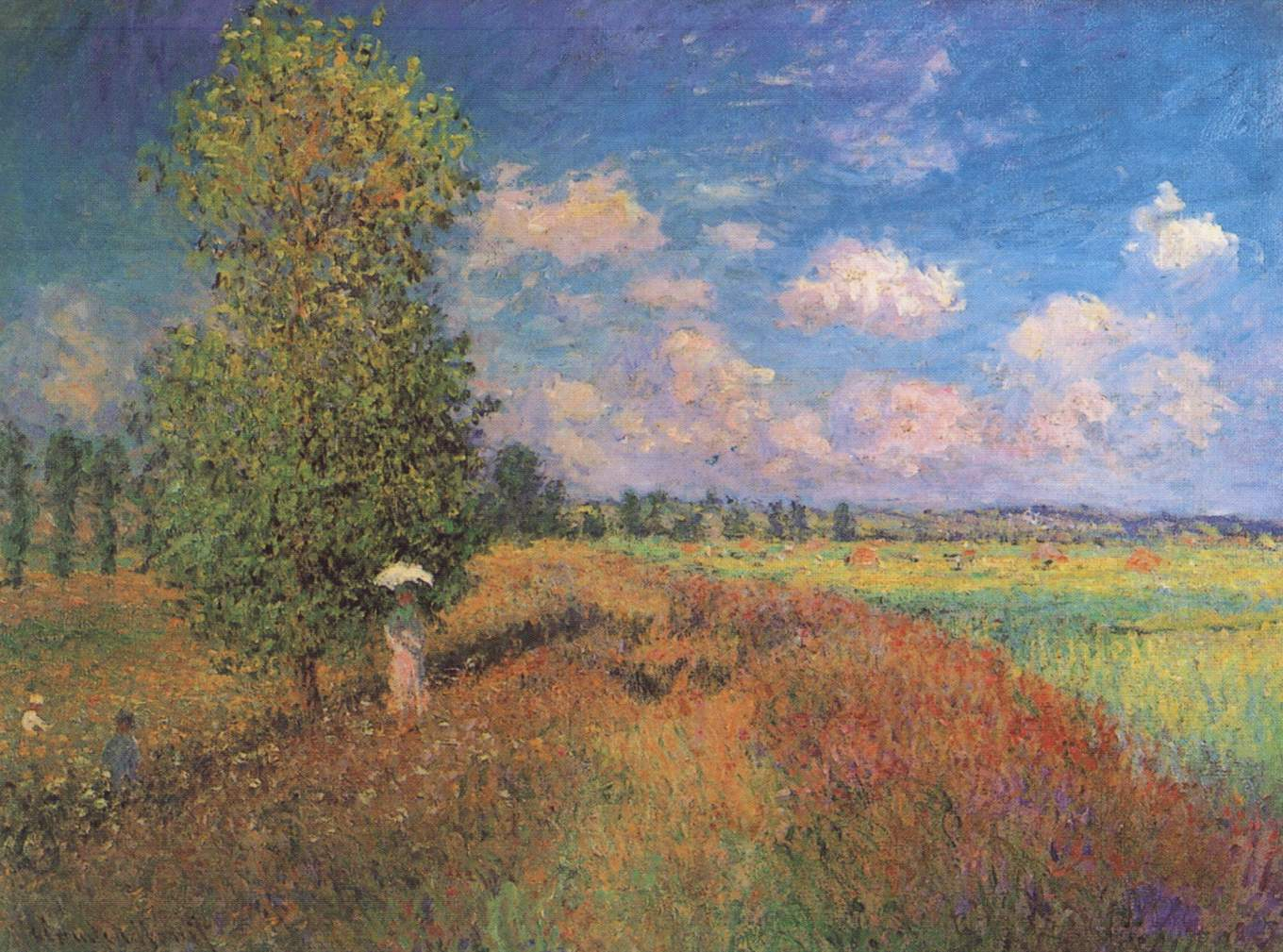
Claude Monet, Summer Field of Coquelicots, 1875

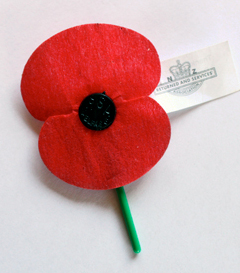
An example of the artificial Flanders poppy, distributed in New Zealand by the RSA for Anzac Day

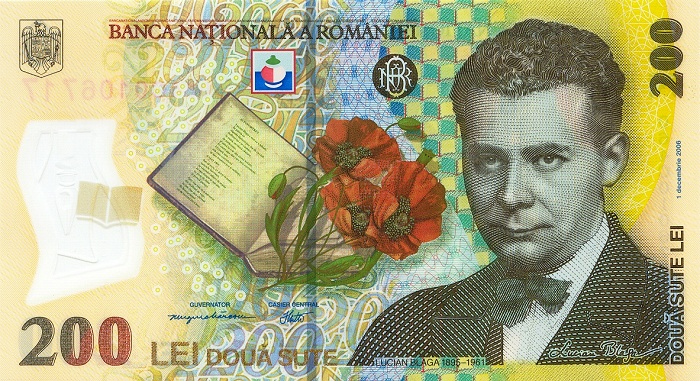
Corn poppies depicted on the obverse of the current Romanian 200 lei note, introduced in 2006

=== China ===
In China, P. rhoeas is known as yumeiren (虞美人, meaning "Yu the Beauty"), after Consort Yu, the concubine of the warlord Xiang Yu. In 202 BC, when they were besieged in the Battle of Gaixia by the force of Liu Bang (founder of the Han dynasty), Consort Yu committed suicide; according to folklore, poppies grew out of the ground where Consort Yu fell, and P. rhoeas thus became a symbol of loyalty unto death.

In 2010, P. rhoeas was at the centre of a diplomatic controversy between China and the United Kingdom; during an official visit to China, British Prime Minister David Cameron and his entourage rejected a demand from China to not wear the remembrance poppy, which the Chinese government had mistaken for the opium poppy, a plant that carries connotations of the Opium Wars in China.

=== Persian literature ===
In Persian literature, red poppies, especially red corn poppy flowers, are considered the flower of love. They are often called the eternal lover flower. In classic and modern Persian poems, the poppy is a symbol of people who died for love (Persian: راه عشق).

Many poems interchange "poppy" and "tulip" (Persian: لاله).

[I] was asking the wind in the field of tulips during the sunrise: whose martyrs are these bloody shrouded?

[The wind] replied: Hafez, you and I are not capable of this secret, sing about red wine and sweet lips.

=== Urdu literature ===
In Urdu literature, red poppies, or "Gul-e-Lalah", are often a symbol of martyrdom, and sometimes of love.

== See also ==
- Poppy
- Coquelicot
- Remembrance Day
- The Red Poppies on Monte Cassino
- White poppy (symbol)
- From Up on Poppy Hill
