= Hermann Linde =

German painter

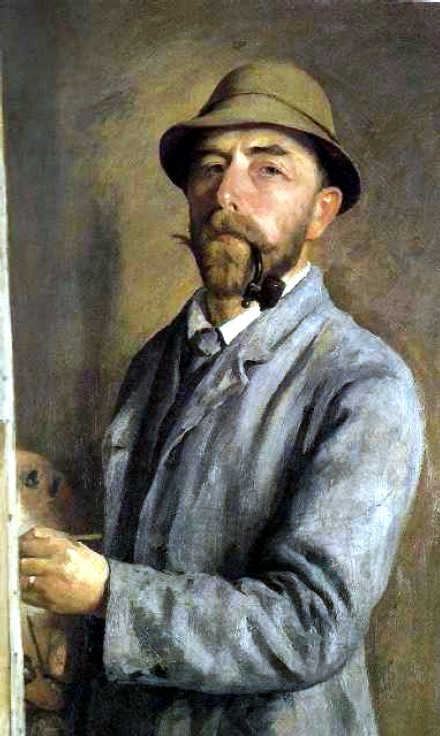
Self-portrait (c. 1910)

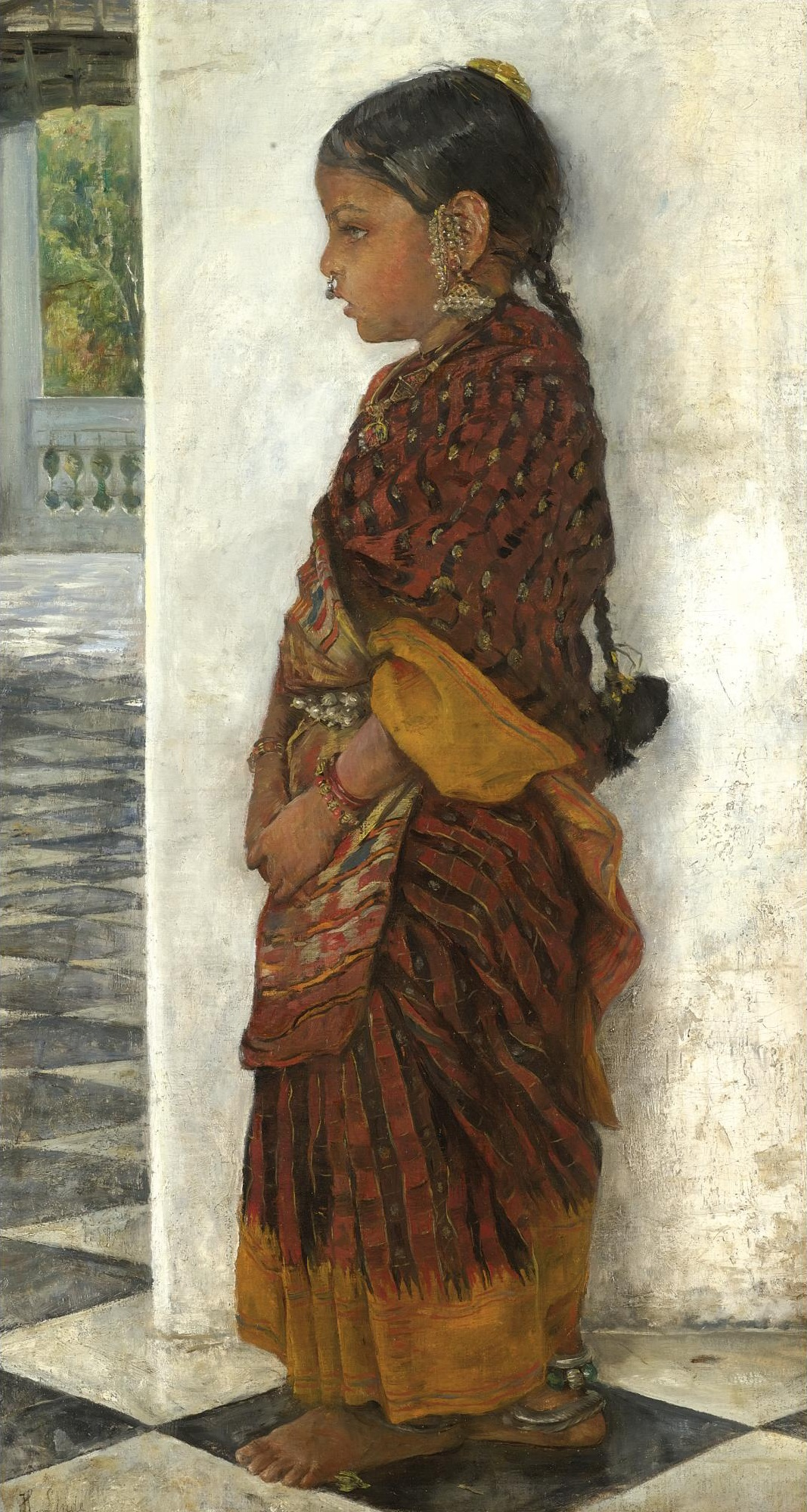
Young girl wearing a Pochampally sari (c. 1895)

Hermann Linde (26 August 1863, Lübeck - 26 June 1923, Arlesheim) was a German painter in the Symbolist style. He specialized in "Oriental" themes.

== Life and work ==
He was the son of Hermann Linde the Elder, a pharmacist and pioneering photographer. His brothers were Max Linde, an ophthalmologist and art collector, and Heinrich Eduard Linde-Walther, who also became a painter. He received his first art lessons from his grandfather Christian Peter Wilhelm Stolle, a decorative painter.

He continued his studies at the Dresden Academy of Fine Arts and the Weimar Saxon-Grand Ducal Art School. In 1890, prompted by his brother Heinrich, who had just returned from Cairo, he took a study trip to Sicily, Egypt and Tunisia. From 1892 to 1895, he worked as a free-lance painter in India. His painting "The Langar Procession" won the Gold Medal of the Viceroy of India. It is currently in the collection of the Übersee-Museum Bremen. In 1896, he stayed briefly in Paris and Tunisia, then spent the next two years at the artists' colony in Dachau.

Some of his father's relatives had been interested in the Anthroposophical Society. After attending a large meeting and lecture in 1906, he became a member. In 1910 he met Steiner, who invited him to paint interior murals for the First Goetheanum. Linde made sketches based on Goethe's Märchen von der Grünen Schlange und der Schönen Lilie (tale of "The Green Snake and the Beautiful Lily"). After seeing the sketches, Steiner suggested that they be done in conjunction with scenes from Steiner's modern mystery play, The Portal of Initiation. Linde would work on the murals and other projects there for many years to follow.

He died six months after the First Goetheanum was destroyed by an arson fire. According to Steiner, he died of a "broken heart", because of all the years he had devoted himself entirely to the building and its artwork.

== Illustrations ==
- Johann Wolfgang von Goethe: The Green Snake and the Beautiful Lily with 12 pictures by Hermann Linde. Steinerbooks (2006) ISBN 0-8801-0570-4
