= Heinrich Eduard Linde-Walther =

German painter

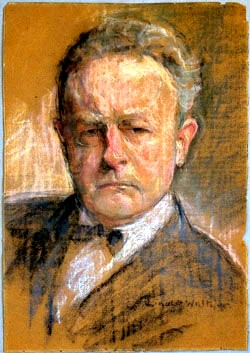
Self-portrait (c.1915)

Heinrich Eduard Linde-Walther, born Walther Heinrich Eduard Linde (16 August 1868, Lübeck - 23 May 1939, Travemünde) was a German painter and illustrator.

== Life ==
He was the son of Hermann Linde the Elder, a pharmacist and pioneering photographer. His brothers were Max Linde, an ophthalmologist and art collector, and Hermann Linde, who was also a painter. He received his first drawing lessons from his grandfather, Christian Peter Wilhelm Stolle, a decorative artist.

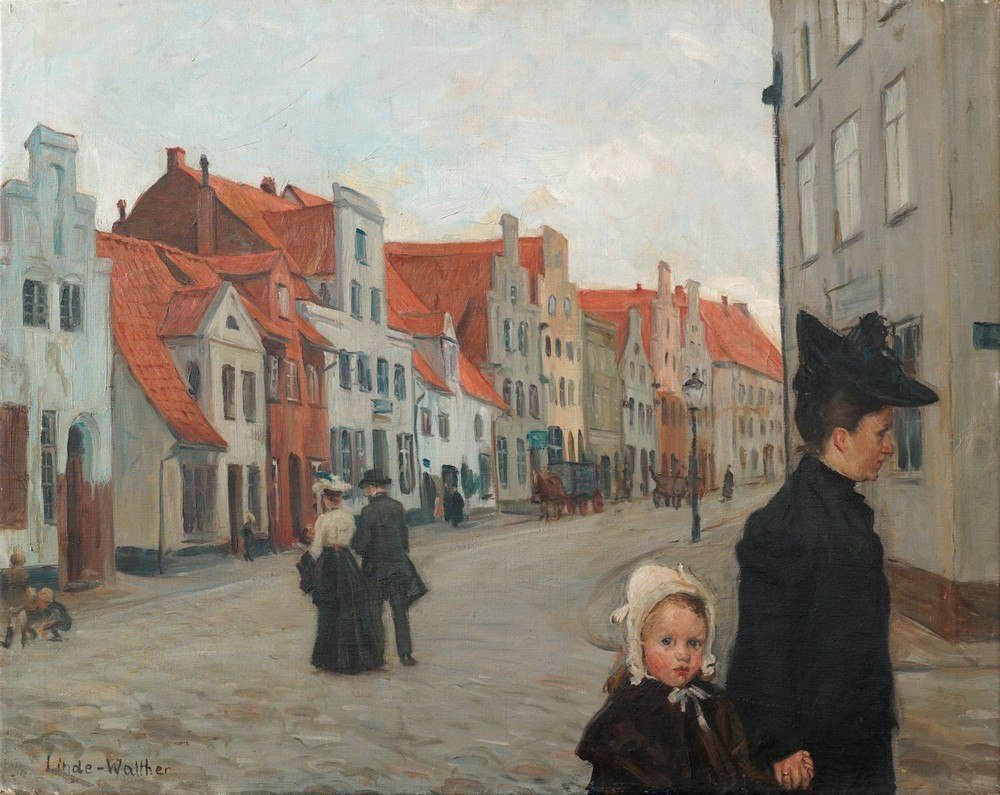
Hartengrube (a street in Lübeck's Old Town, c.1903)

He became a student in the Department of Photography at the "Graphische Lehr- und Versuchsanstalt" (Graphic Arts and Research Institute) in Vienna. From 1887 to 1889 he worked as a photographer and colorist (someone who adds color to black-and-white photographs) in Cairo. He attended the Academy of Fine Arts, Munich, from 1891 to 1894, where he studied with Gabriel von Hackl and Paul Hoecker. From 1895 to 1898 he was at the Académie Julian in Paris, then travelled extensively, visiting Sweden, the Netherlands and Spain.

After 1900, he lived in Berlin and became a member of the Berlin Secession in 1902, continuing to travel and exhibit widely. He was mostly known for landscapes and still-lifes, but also did numerous portraits of children. Most of his works were commissioned by individual clients and remain in private ownership. In addition to paintings, he produced book illustrations and was especially noted for his work on the children's storybooks published by A. Molling & Comp.

== Selected illustrations ==
- Dideldumdei. 16 color illustrations by Linde-Walther, with verses by L. Linde. Hanover: A. Molling & Comp. 1921
- Plattdeutsche Spruchweisheiten. (Low German Proverbs), foreword by "Munkepunke" (Alfred Richard Meyer). Wolfshagen-Scharbeutz, Westphal 1955
- Johannes Gillhoff: Jürnjakob Swehn, der Amerikafahrer. (Jürnjakob Swehn, the Traveller to America). With drawings by H. E. Linde-Walther, Berlin: Tägliche Rundschau 1921
