= Rhoeadine =

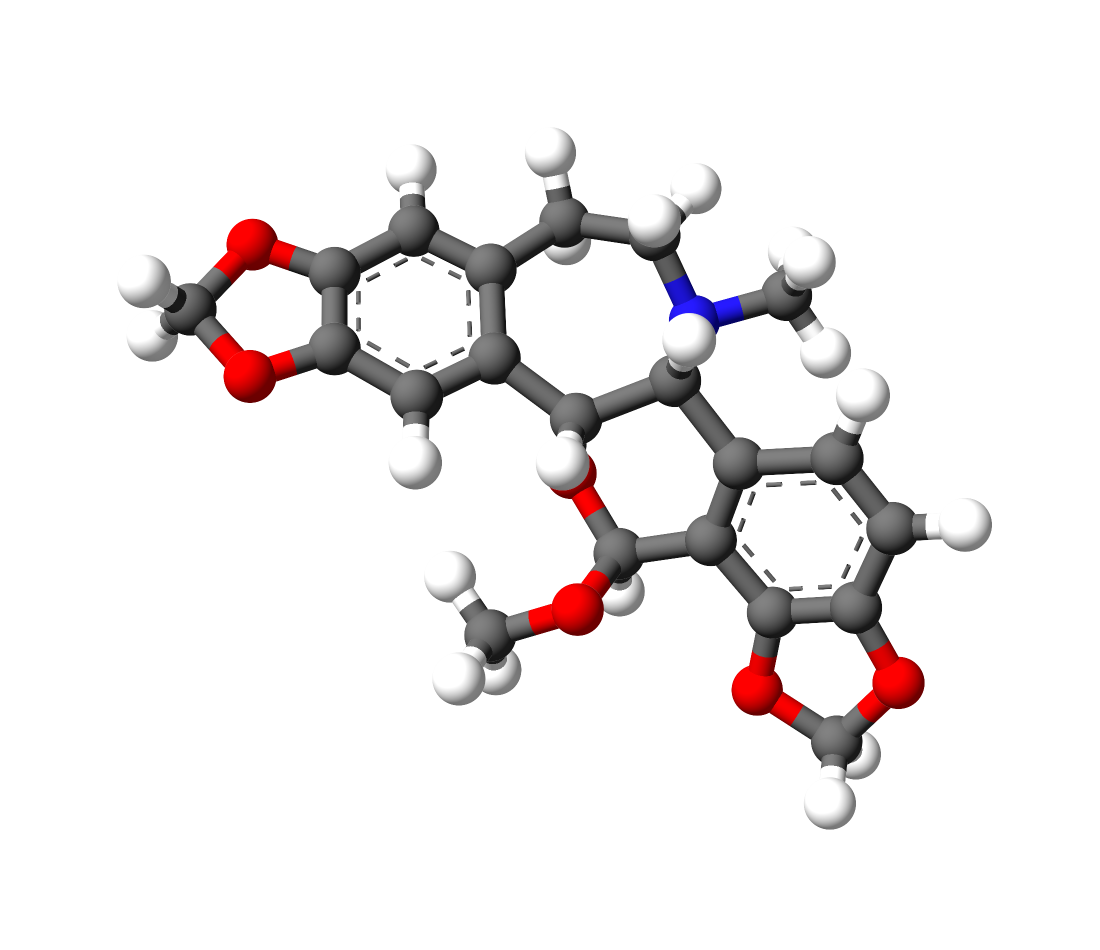

Names
- IUPAC name 8β-Methoxy-16-methyl-2′H,2′′H-bis([1,3]dioxolo)[4′,5′:2,3;4′′,5′′:10,11]rhedan
- Systematic IUPAC name (5bR,13bR,15S)-15-Methoxy-6-methyl-5b,6,7,8,13b,15-hexahydro-2H,11H-[1,3]dioxolo[4,5-h][1,3]dioxolo[4′,5′:7,8][2]benzopyrano[3,4-a][4]benzazepine
- Other names Rheadine; Rhoeadin

Identifiers
CAS Number	2718-25-4
3D model (JSmol)	Interactive image
ChEBI	CHEBI:8836
ChemSpider	171184
KEGG	C09619
PubChem CID	197775
UNII	9Q9C65WH3B
CompTox Dashboard (EPA)	DTXSID10181652
- InChI: InChI=1S/C21H21NO6/c1-22-6-5-11-7-15-16(26-9-25-15)8-13(11)19-18(22)12-3-4-14-20(27-10-24-14)17(12)21(23-2)28-19/h3-4,7-8,18-19,21H,5-6,9-10H2,1-2H3/t18-,19-,21+/m1/s1 Key: XRBIHOLQAKITPP-SBHAEUEKSA-N; InChI=1/C21H21NO6/c1-22-6-5-11-7-15-16(26-9-25-15)8-13(11)19-18(22)12-3-4-14-20(27-10-24-14)17(12)21(23-2)28-19/h3-4,7-8,18-19,21H,5-6,9-10H2,1-2H3/t18-,19-,21+/m1/s1 Key: XRBIHOLQAKITPP-SBHAEUEKBA
- SMILES: CN1CCC2=CC3=C(C=C2[C@@H]4[C@H]1C5=C([C@H](O4)OC)C6=C(C=C5)OCO6)OCO3

Properties
Chemical formula	C_{21}H_{21}NO_{6}
Molar mass	383.400 g·mol^{−1}
Density	1.45 g/cm^{3}
- Except where otherwise noted, data are given for materials in their standard state (at 25 °C [77 °F], 100 kPa). verify (what is ?) Infobox references

Rhoeadine (rheadine) is an alkaloid derived from the flowers of the corn poppy (Papaver rhoeas). It has been studied for its potential use in the treatment of morphine dependence.

== Toxicity ==
5 different patients were admitted to ER after being intoxicated with corn poppy. Symptoms of intoxication include nausea, vomiting, confusion, seizures, myosis and arrhythmia. These symptoms may be an outlier due to the exceptionally high dose ingested.
