= Karditsa Thinker =

Neolithic clay figurine

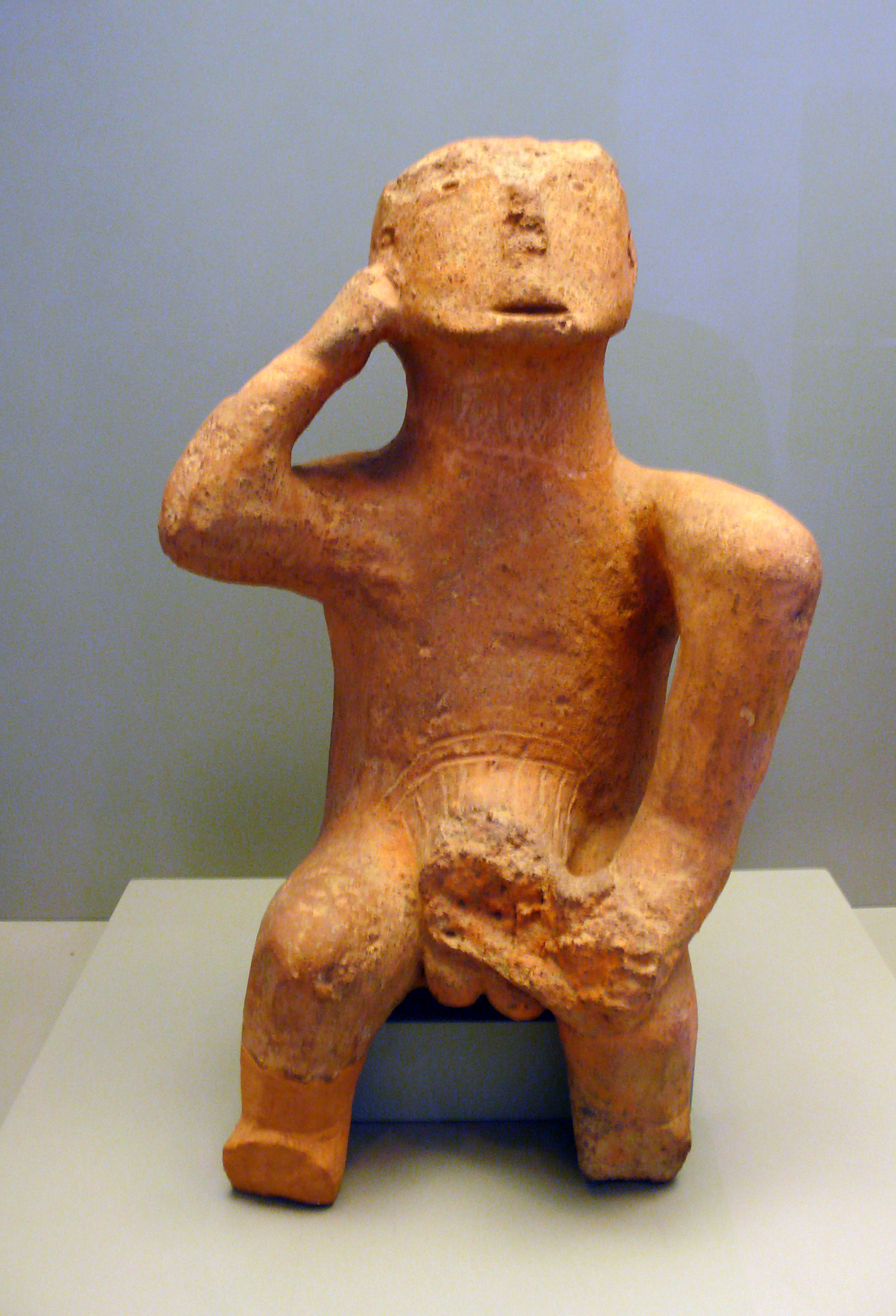
- Karditsa Thinker at the National Archaeological Museum, Athens
- Material: Terracotta
- Height: c. 50 cm
- Created: c. 3900 BC
- Discovered: Thessaly, Greece
- Present location: Athens, Attica, Greece

The Karditsa Thinker, or the Thinker of Karditsa (Greek: στοχαστής της Καρδίτσας), is a Neolithic clay figurine found in the area of Karditsa in Thessaly, Greece. This artifact, dating back to the Final Neolithic period (4500-3300 B.C.), is a solid clay figurine of a seated man. It conveys the impression of a man looking upwards, and his hand is supporting his head which suggests a person who is thinking.

Standing about half a meter tall, the figurine exhibits features of fully developed sculpture and is considered the largest Neolithic artifact found in Greece. The pronounced ithyphallic element, though mostly broken, along with its size, suggests a possible cultic character, possibly representing an agrarian deity associated with the fertility of the land.

It is made of terracotta and is considered a significant archaeological find due to its size and artistic value. The figurine is believed to have been created during the Neolithic period, a time characterized by the transition from hunting and gathering to settled agriculture. It is currently housed in the Greek Prehistory Gallery of the National Archaeological Museum, Athens.

== See also ==
- The Thinker
- Spong Man
- Lorenzo de Medici
- Thinker from Yehud
