= Thinker from Yehud =

Middle Bronze Age clay figurine

- Material: Clay
- Height: 18 centimetres (7.1 in)
- Created: c. 1700 BC
- Discovered: 2016; Yehud, Central District, Israel
- Present location: Israel Museum, Jerusalem, Israel

The Thinker from Yehud is an archaeological figurine discovered during salvage excavations in the Israeli city of Yehud. The figurine, which sits atop a ceramic jug in a posture resembling Rodin's famous sculpture "The Thinker," dates back to the Middle Bronze Age II (c. 1800–1600 BC). It was found in a tomb accompanied by various items, including daggers, spearheads, an axe head, a knife, two male sheep, and a donkey, all likely buried as offerings. After its discovery, the broken jug had to be stabilised and restored before being displayed in the Canaanite Galleries of the Israel Museum in West Jerusalem.

== Discovery ==
The Thinker from Yehud is an archaeological clay male figurine, which is a part of a vase and more specifically of a prochos. The find was revealed on 23 November 2016 in excavations carried out by the Authority in Yehud, a suburb of the city of Tel Aviv, just north of Ben Gurion Airport. According to Israeli archaeologists, the vase is a typical example of the Middle Bronze Age II (2200–1500 BC) and dates back to around 1800–1600 BC.

== Description and purpose ==
After its discovery, the broken jug had to be stabilised and restored. The peculiarity of the vessel lies in the presence of the clay male figure, which was affixed to the upper part of the vessel after its construction. The procho's neck served as the base for forming the upper part of the statuette, while the legs, arms and face were added afterwards. It is unknown whether this was done by the potter himself or by a different craftsman.

The figurine is 18 centimetres (7.1 in) high and depicts a seated male figure, who supports his face with his right hand in a contemplative posture. The figurine is seated with the body positioned on top of a ceramic jug. The figure's face is resting on one hand, with the elbow placed on the knee or thigh, suggesting a posture of introspection and reflection. The head is slightly inclined downward, emphasising the focus and concentration of the individual. The construction of the form captures in a unique way the details of the body, but also the expressive features of the face.

Other objects, such as vases, arrowheads, swords, but also the bones of sheep, and probably of a donkey, were also found near the place where it was found. Gilad Itach, head of the excavations and doctoral candidate at Bar-Ilan University, speculates that this is a set of burial offerings, probably in honor of an important person of the community there. At the beginning of the year, a total of 94 graves were found near the spot where the "thinker" was found, also dating to the Middle Bronze Age.

The Middle Bronze Age period has been characterised as one of the longest and darkest periods in the region's history and many interpretations and opinions have been put forward by scholars. The era is characterised by the influences from neighbouring peoples, such as the Egyptians, the Mesopotamians and even the Minoans, with various trade relations, the development of new types of pottery, the extensive use of copper and the cultivation of the vine. The people of the period seem to have had a developed degree of ideology and, as evidenced by their burial customs, they believed in some kind of afterlife.

The recent finding of the "thinking" man seems to argue for the existence of a developed ideology of some type in this period, while it is impossible not to refer us to similar timeless types, such as the "Karditsa Thinker" of the Neolithic era or even of Rodin's "The Thinker" in modern times. The figurine is displayed in the Canaanite Galleries of the Israel Museum in West Jerusalem.
