= Max Linde =

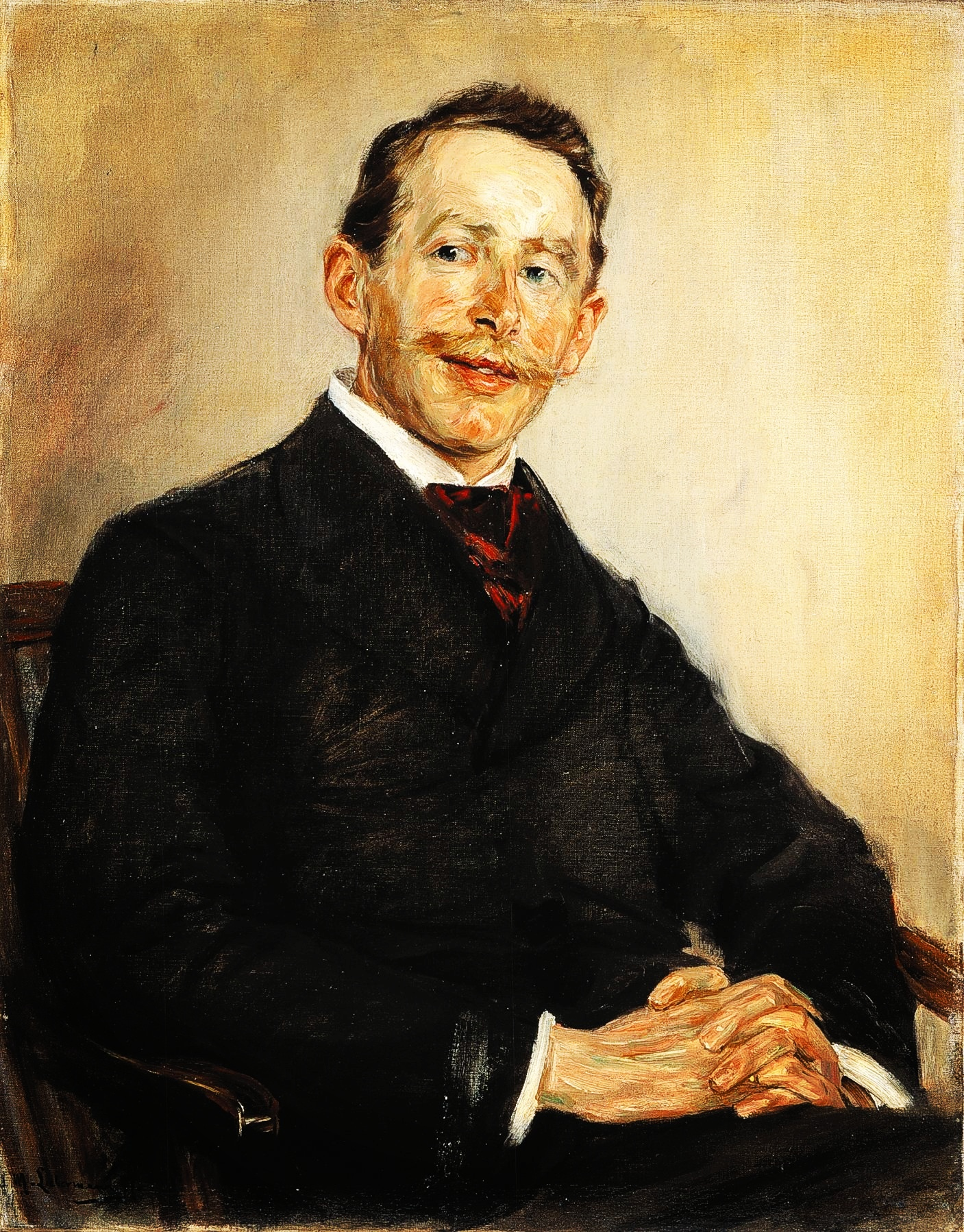
Portrait of Max Linde by Max Liebermann in Behnhaus, (c. 1897)

Max Linde (14 June 1862 – 23 April 1940, in Lübeck) was an ophthalmologist who is best known as a patron and art collector of the early 20th century. He was an important patron of the painter Edvard Munch, among others. He had the most extensive private collection of sculptures by Auguste Rodin in Germany. In 1903 he commissioned a monumental cast of Rodin's The Thinker. Munch painted The Thinker in his garden in 1907. His brothers Hermann and Heinrich were painters.

== Works ==
- Max Linde: Edvard Munch und die Kunst der Zukunft, Berlin 1902
