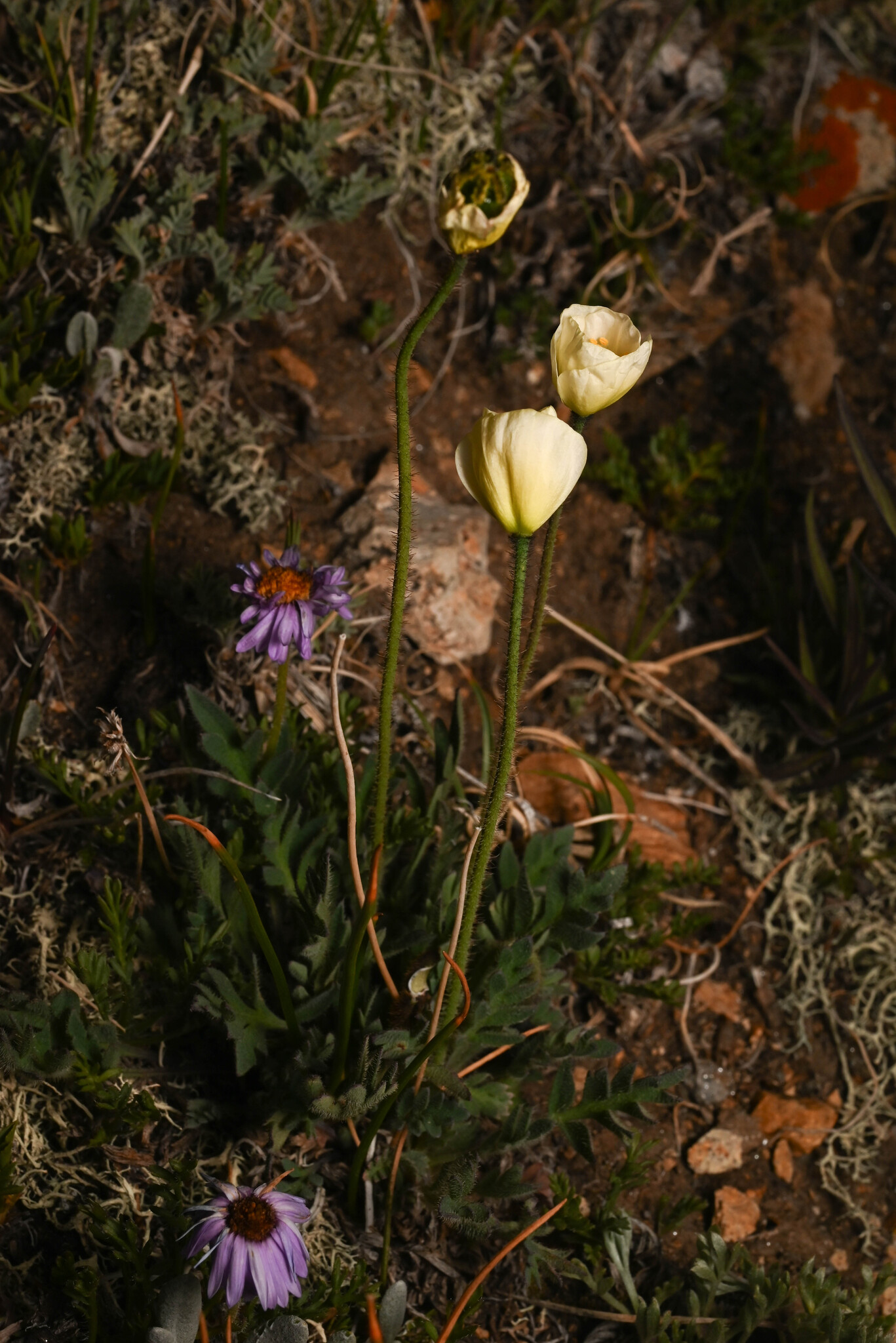

Scientific classification
- Kingdom: Plantae
- Clade: Tracheophytes
- Clade: Angiosperms
- Clade: Eudicots
- Order: Ranunculales
- Family: Papaveraceae
- Genus: Oreomecon
- Species: O. coloradensis

Binomial name
- Oreomecon coloradensis (Fedde) Krivenko

Synonyms
- Papaver coloradense; Papaver nudicaule var. coloradense

= Oreomecon coloradensis =

Plant species in the poppy family

Oreomecon coloradensis, the Rocky Mountain poppy, is a species in the poppy family that is native to areas above timberline in the Rocky Mountains from New Mexico to Montana.

== Description ==
Rocky Mountain poppy is a perennial plant that grows to loose tuft of basal leaves. The whole plant can be 5 to 20 centimeters (2 to 8 in) tall, though typically 7 to 17 cm. The leaves and stems grow from a branched caudex that is covered in the old ends of leaf stems.

The leaves are gray to blue-green, but are not covered in surface waxes. Each one has a petiole, the leaf stem, that is 0.75–5 cm long. The leaf stems are green and thin, but with a broad base that is wide spear-head shape. The leaf itself is small, 0.7 to 3 centimeters long and just 0.4 to 2.2 cm wide. They are mostly egg shaped in outline, but with deep lobes that are usually in three pairs. Sometimes the lobes have smaller lobes at their tips.

The flowering stems are scapes, a leafless flower stem, each with a single bloom at the end in this species and covered in hairs that are pale brown near the base and darker higher up. They grow from either the terminal end of the caudex or from leaf axils and can be 5.5 to 18 cm long. The flower buds face downwards and measure 6 to 9 millimeters long with a diameter of 4.2–6 mm. They are somewhat egg shaped and covered in black hairs. When the flower opens the sepals drop away. The flowers are small with bright yellow petals, usually four in number, but sometimes as many as eight. They measure 9.5–14 mm. When fading the petals sometimes turn somewhat blue or green in color. The center of the flower is filled a great many stamens, each 4 to 7.7 mm long and white to yellow, but always tipped with yellow anthers. The fruit is a capsule with four to seven ribs and covered in dark brown, nearly black hairs. The seeds are also dark brown and shaped like a comma, about 0.7 mm. Blooming usually occurs in July or August, but might start as early as June.

== Taxonomy ==
Oreomecon coloradensis was scientifically described as a variety of Papaver nudicaule named coloradense in 1909 by Friedrich Fedde. He described it using a type specimen collected east of Middle Park in Colorado in 1867. The botanists E. O. Wooton and Paul Carpenter Standley published a description of it as a species in 1915. Though it was described early in the century, specimens from the Rocky Mountains continued to be identified as Papaver radicatum, Papaver kluanense, or Papaver pygmaeum through the end of the 1900s and into the 2000s. It was moved to the genus Oreomecon with a slightly modified species name in 2023 by Denis A. Krivenko. Though Oreomecon coloradensis is the accepted name according to Plants of the World Online (POWO), World Flora Online, and World Plants, it is considered to be synonymous with Papaver radicatum subsp. kluanense by NatureServe and the USDA NRCS.

According to POWO it has five synonyms.

Table of Synonyms
Name	Year	Rank	Notes
Papaver coloradense (Fedde) Fedde ex Wooton & Standl.	1915	species	≡ hom.
Papaver coloradense var. aurantiellum Cockerell	1915	variety	= het.
Papaver coloradense var. typicum Cockerell	1915	variety	≡ hom., not validly publ.
Papaver nudicaule var. coloradense Fedde	1909	variety	≡ hom.
Papaver uintaense S.L.Welsh	2003	species	= het.
Notes: ≡ homotypic synonym ; = heterotypic synonym

=== Names ===
Oreomecon coloradensis is known by the common names Rocky Mountain poppy, Colorado poppy, and Uinta poppy.

== Range and habitat ==
The Rocky Mountain poppy is native to the states of Colorado, Idaho, Montana, New Mexico, Utah, and Wyoming. In New Mexico it grows in the northeast of the state, northward through southwestern and central Colorado. In Utah it is found in the Uinta Mountains in the northeast and in northwestern Wyoming. The range extends into central Idaho and southern Montana. The most northerly known population is in the Crazy Mountains in Montana. The plants grow at elevations of 3,050 to 3,900 meters (10,010 to 12,800 ft), though occasionally as high as 4,250 m (13,940 ft) in Colorado.

This species is almost exclusively found above the treeline in the alpine tundra. There it grows on rocky slopes such as dry scree at the base of cliffs and fellfield.
