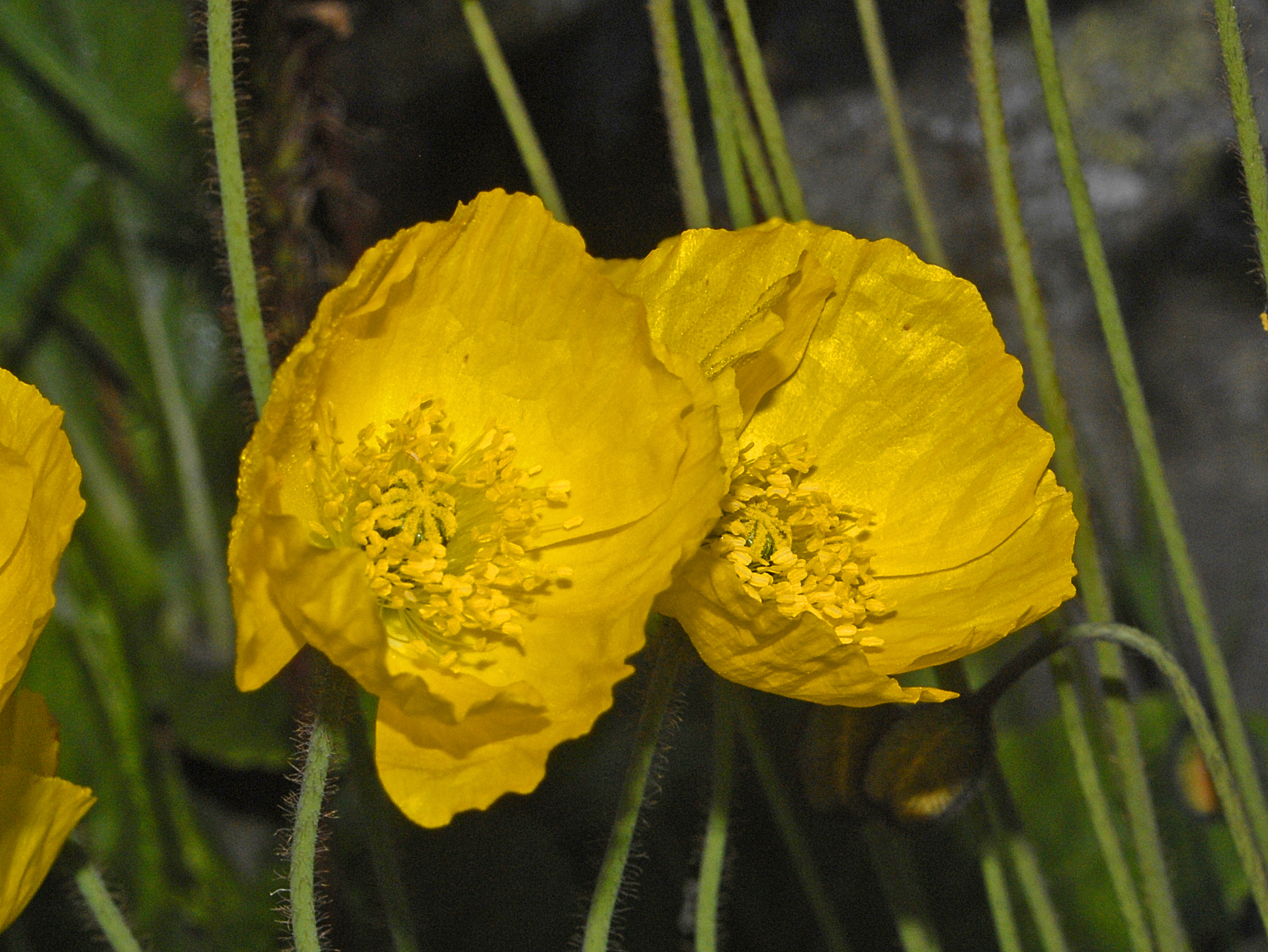
- At the Giardino Botanico Alpino Chanousia

Scientific classification
- Kingdom: Plantae
- Clade: Tracheophytes
- Clade: Angiosperms
- Clade: Eudicots
- Order: Ranunculales
- Family: Papaveraceae
- Genus: Oreomecon
- Species: O. crocea

Binomial name
- Oreomecon crocea (Ledeb.) Banfi, Bartolucci, J.-M.Tison & Galasso

Synonyms
- Papaver alpinum var. croceum; Papaver croceum; Papaver nudicaule var. croceum

= Oreomecon crocea =

Asian plant species in the poppy family

Oreomecon crocea, common name ice poppy, is a species of flowering plant in the poppy family.

== Description ==
Oreomecon crocea can reach a height of 30–40 centimetres (12–16 in). It is a biennial or perennial herbaceous plant, with a basal rosette of long-stalked bluish-green lobed leaves. The stems are leafless and haired. Flowers are actinomorphic, solitary, 5–6 centimetres (2.0–2.4 in) wide, with four yellow, orange, reddish or white petals. They bloom from June to August. This plant is cultivated as an ornamental plant and erroneously sold under the name of Papaver nudicaule, that is instead a different species (Papaver nudicaule L. – common names Iceland poppy, Icelandic poppy).

== Taxonomy ==
Oreomecon crocea was scientifically described and named Papaver croceum in 1830 by Carl Friedrich von Ledebour. It has also been considered to be variety of Papaver nudicaule or of Papaver alpinum. In 2021 it was moved to the new genus Oreomecon, giving the species its accepted name. It has 25 synonyms according to Plants of the World Online.

Table of Synonyms
Name	Year	Rank	Notes
Papaver alpinum var. croceum (Ledeb.) Ledeb.	1841	variety	≡ hom.
Papaver alpinum var. leucanthum Trautv.	1860	variety	= het.
Papaver alpinum lusus leucanthum (Trautv.) Regel	1862	sport	= het.
Papaver alpinum lusus tenue Regel	1862	sport	= het.
Papaver angrenicum Pazij	1941	species	= het.
Papaver croceum Ledeb.	1830	species	≡ hom.
Papaver croceum subsp. altaicum Serg.	1931	subspecies	= het.
Papaver croceum subsp. corydalifolium (Fedde) Tolm.	1931	subspecies	= het.
Papaver croceum var. glabrifolium Serg.	1931	variety	= het.
Papaver croceum var. glabrum Serg.	1931	variety	= het.
Papaver croceum var. hirsutum Serg.	1931	variety	= het.
Papaver croceum var. pilosum Serg.	1931	variety	= het.
Papaver himalaycum Cretz.	1934	species	= het.
Papaver ledebourianum var. leucanthum (Trautv.) Peschkova	1972	variety	= het.
Papaver nudicaule f. albiflorum Lundstr.	1923	form	= het., nom. illeg.
Papaver nudicaule subsp. aurantiacum Fedde	1909	subspecies	= het.
Papaver nudicaule subsp. corydalifolium (Fedde) N.Busch	1913	subspecies	= het.
Papaver nudicaule var. corydalifolium Fedde	1909	variety	= het.
Papaver nudicaule var. croceum (Ledeb.) Elkan	1839	variety	≡ hom.
Papaver nudicaule var. glabratum DC.	1821	variety	= het.
Papaver nudicaule var. leucanthum Trautv.	1860	variety	= het.
Papaver nudicaule var. subcorydalifolium Fedde	1909	variety	= het.
Papaver nudicaule var. tenue (Regel) Fedde	1909	variety	= het.
Papaver nudicaule var. trilobifolium Fedde	1909	variety	= het.
Papaver pseudotenellum Grubov	1955	species	= het.
Notes: ≡ homotypic synonym; = heterotypic synonym

== Distribution and habitat ==
Oreomecon crocea is a native of southern Siberia, Central Asia, and Mongolia.

It can be found in pasture, meadows, rocky slopes and landfill areas.
