= Oreomecon anomala =

Scientific classification
- Kingdom: Plantae
- Clade: Tracheophytes
- Clade: Angiosperms
- Clade: Eudicots
- Order: Ranunculales
- Family: Papaveraceae
- Genus: Oreomecon
- Species: O. anomala

Binomial name
- Oreomecon anomala (Fedde) Banfi, Bartolucci, J.-M.Tison & Galasso

Synonyms
- Papaver anomalum; Papaver nudicaule subsp. anomalum

Flowering plant species in the poppy family

Oreomecon anomala is a poppy found in Mongolia, Korea, China and Far East of Russia (Primorsky krai). It grows on dry meadow slopes, in river valleys, sometimes on deposits and dumps. Blooms in May–September.

== Description ==
A perennial low-growing herbaceous plant. Leaves are all long-petioled, grayish-green from above, covered with sparse hairs; from below they are completely grayish-blue, with sparse bristles and visible veins. Stems are straight, strongly elongate, covered with very sparse rusty-yellow hairs, reaching 30–40 cm in length. Flowers are about 3–4 cm in diameter. The petals are round, white to orange, about 2 cm in diameter, with a slightly wavy-silvery edge. The pistils are saber-shaped, blackening, and the stamens are linear, orange. The fruits are distinctly globular, smooth, distinctly ribbed, about 1 cm in diameter.

== Taxonomy ==
Oreomecon anomala was given the name Papaver anomalum by Friedrich Karl Georg Fedde and scientifically described in 1909. It was described as a subspecies of Papaver nudicaule in 1985 by Vladimir Nikolaevich Voroschilov. It was moved to the new genus Oreomecon in 2021 by Enrico Augusto Banfi, Fabrizio Bartolucci, Jean-Marc Tison, and Gabriele Galasso. The resulting name of Oreomecon anomala is the accepted name according to Plants of the World Online, World Flora Online, and World Plants. It has eleven synonyms.

Table of Synonyms
Name	Year	Rank	Notes
Papaver alpinum lusus chinense Regel	1862	sport	= het.
Papaver anomalum Fedde	1909	species	≡ hom.
Papaver anomalum var. chinense (Regel) Tolm.	1970	variety	= het.
Papaver borealisinense Kitag.	1973	species	= het.
Papaver chinense (Regel) Kitag.	1954	species	= het.
Papaver croceum subsp. chinense (Regel) Rändel	1974	subspecies	= het.
Papaver nudicaule subsp. anomalum (Fedde) Vorosch.	1985	subspecies	≡ hom.
Papaver nudicaule subsp. chinense (Regel) N.Busch	1913	subspecies	= het.
Papaver nudicaule var. chinense (Regel) Fedde	1909	variety	= het.
Papaver nudicaule var. isopyroides Fedde	1909	variety	= het.
Papaver nudicaule var. pleiopetalum J.C.Shao	2009	variety	= het.
Notes: ≡ homotypic synonym; = heterotypic synonym
