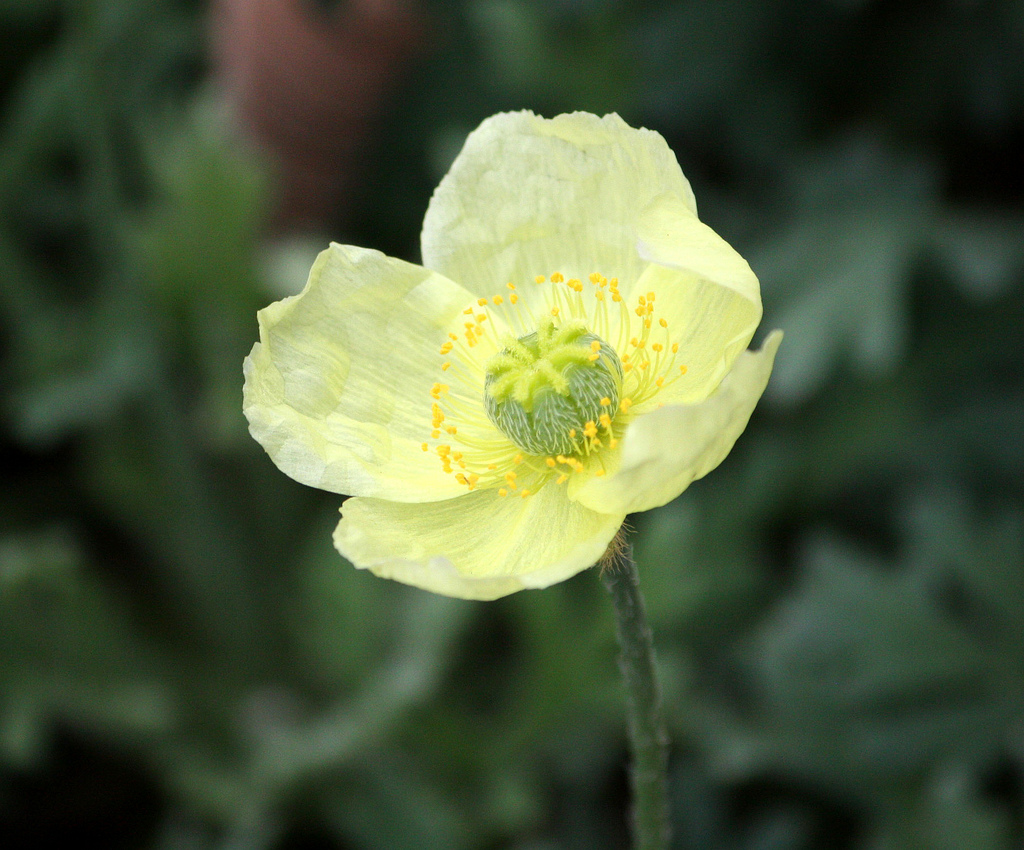

Scientific classification
- Kingdom: Plantae
- Clade: Tracheophytes
- Clade: Angiosperms
- Clade: Eudicots
- Order: Ranunculales
- Family: Papaveraceae
- Genus: Oreomecon
- Species: O. lapponica

Binomial name
- Oreomecon lapponica (Tolm.) Galasso, Banfi & Bartolucci

Synonyms
- Papaver lapponicum; Papaver radicatum subsp. lapponicum

= Oreomecon lapponica =

Plant species in the poppy family

Oreomecon lapponica is a species in the poppy family known by the common name Lapland poppy. It grows in the Arctic tundra from Norway around the arctic circle to Greenland. Until 2023 it was known as Papaver lapponicum.

== Description ==
Oreomecon lapponica is a herbaceous plant that grows multiple flowering stems that are rarely less than 20 centimeters and can reach lengths of 35 cm. Its leaves range in lengths from 5 to 12 cm. but also have a petiole, a leaf stem, that is half to three-quarters the length of the leaf. All of its leaves are in a tuft at the base of the plant and are covered in long white hairs, sometimes very densely. They are lanceolate in outline, shaped like the head of a spear, but with one or two primary lobes as well as two or three pairs of lobes on the sides.

The flowering stems and the single bud at the top of each can be hairless or covered in stiff bristle-like hairs, the color of the hairs is grey-brown. The stems grow straight upwards. The flowers are relatively small, for a poppy, with a diameter of 25 to 35 millimeters. Their petals are largely yellow, only occasionally touched with pink towards their ends. The anthers are also yellow and each flower has five to seven stigmas.

The fruit is a capsule as much as 2 centimeters in length and equally broad to only two-fifths as wide as long.

== Taxonomy ==
Oreomecon lapponica was first scientifically described as a subspecies of Papaver radicatum nameed lapponicum by Alexandr Innokentevich Tolmatchew in 1923. The botanist Rolf Nordhagen reclassified it as a species named Papaver lapponicum in 1931. In 2021 a new genus named Oreomecon was created by Gabriele Galasso, Enrico Augusto Banfi, and Fabrizio Bartolucci. In 2023 and the species was moved to it as Oreomecon lapponica.

=== Names ===
Oreomecon lapponica is known by the common name Lapland poppy.

== Range and habitat ==
Lapland poppies have a circumpolar distribution, being native to Norway, the northern parts of Russia and Siberia, Alaska, the northern territories of Canada, and Greenland. It grows from sea level up to elevations of 1000 meters.

It grows in mesic tundra environments and also in the sand and gravel of floodplains and shorelines.
