= Papaver stipitatum =

Papaver stipitatum is a botanical synonym of two species of plant:

- Papaver rhoeas, synonym published in 1909 by Friedrich Fedde
- Papaver somniferum, synonym published in 1835 by Louis Cincinnatus Sévérin Léon Hussenot
