= C17H17NO3 =

The molecular formula C_{17}H_{17}NO_{3} (molar mass: 283.322 g/mol, exact mass: 283.1208 u) may refer to:

- Morphinone
- Ro01-6128
