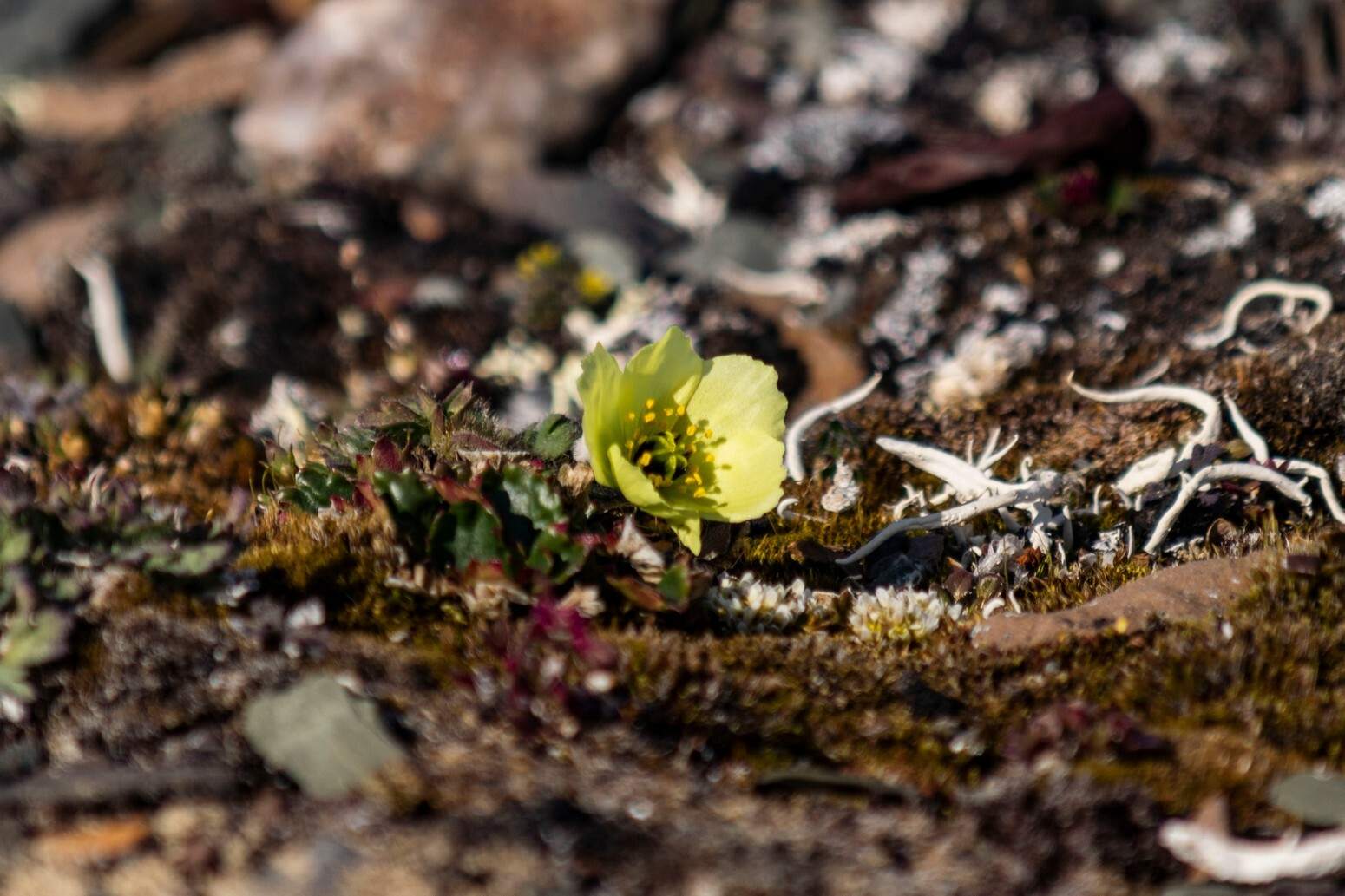
- On Severnaya Zemlya in Russia

Scientific classification
- Kingdom: Plantae
- Clade: Embryophytes
- Clade: Tracheophytes
- Clade: Spermatophytes
- Clade: Angiosperms
- Clade: Eudicots
- Order: Ranunculales
- Family: Papaveraceae
- Genus: Oreomecon
- Species: O. polaris

Binomial name
- Oreomecon polaris (Tolm.) Krivenko

Synonyms
- List: Oreomecon dahliana subsp. polaris; Papaver dahlianum subsp. polare; Papaver polare; Papaver radicatum subsp. polare

= Oreomecon polaris =

Arctic species of flowering plant

Oreomecon polaris is an Arctic species of plant in the poppy family.

== Description ==
Oreomecon polaris is a small plant with as dense to somewhat loose tuft of basal leaves. It grows just 10 cm (3.9 in) tall.

Its leaves reach 4 cm (1.6 in) long with a leaf stem as much as half as long as the leaf itself. They are blue-green to green on both sides and broadly lanceolate, shaped like a wide spear head, to more or less egg-shaped. Each leaf's sides are divided into two or three pairs of lobes.

The flowers are yellow to white in color and as much as 3 cm (1.2 in) in diameter. They are found on the curving, leafless stems that are densely covered in dark hairs. Blooming can occur in June or July.

== Taxonomy ==
Oreomecon polaris was scientifically described as a subspecies of Papaver radicatum named polare in 1923 by the botanist Alexander Tolmachov. It was raised to species status as Papaver polare in 1949 in a publication by Ivan Aleksandrovich Perfiljev. It was moved to the genus Oreomecon in 2023 by Denis A. Krivenko. It has 17 synonyms.

Table of Synonyms
Name	Year	Rank	Notes
Oreomecon cornwallisensis (D.Löve) Elvebakk & Bjerke	2024	species	= het.
Oreomecon dahliana subsp. polaris (Tolm.) Elvebakk & Bjerke	2024	subspecies	≡ hom.
Oreomecon uschakovii (Tolm. & V.V.Petrovsky) Elvebakk & Bjerke	2024	species	= het.
Papaver cornwallisense D.Löve	1956	species	= het.
Papaver dahlianum var. hadacianum Á.Löve	1955	variety	= het.
Papaver dahlianum subsp. polare (Tolm.) Elven & Ö.Nilsson	2000	subspecies	≡ hom.
Papaver langeanum (C.E.Lundstr.) Tolm.	1960	species	= het.
Papaver nudicaule var. albiflorum Lange	1880	variety	= het.
Papaver polare (Tolm.) Perfil.	1949	species	≡ hom.
Papaver radicatum var. albiflorum (Lange) Porsild	1912	variety	= het., nom. illeg.
Papaver radicatum f. glabriusculum Hartz	1895	form	= het.
Papaver radicatum f. parvifolium Serg.	1931	form	= het.
Papaver radicatum subsp. polare Tolm.	1923	subspecies	≡ hom.
Papaver radicatum f. pygmaeum Hartz	1895	form	= het.
Papaver rubroaurantiacum subsp. langeanum C.E.Lundstr.	1923	subspecies	= het.
Papaver uschakovii Tolm. & V.V.Petrovsky	1973	species	= het.
Papaver uschakovii subsp. tichomirovii Kozhevn.	1979	subspecies	= het.
Notes: ≡ homotypic synonym ; = heterotypic synonym

== Range ==
Oreomecon polaris is native to many areas of the Arctic including Nunavut in northern Canada and Greenland. It grows in the Norwegian archipelago of Svalbard in the far north of Europe and also to much of northern Russia from Europe to western Siberia. They can be found from sealevel to 1,000 meters (3,300 ft) in elevation.

It grows on nearly barren areas of the Arctic tundra in both rocky and clay soils.
