= Silene taimyrensis =

Scientific classification
- Kingdom: Plantae
- Clade: Tracheophytes
- Clade: Angiosperms
- Clade: Eudicots
- Order: Caryophyllales
- Family: Caryophyllaceae
- Genus: Silene
- Species: S. taimyrensis

Binomial name
- Silene taimyrensis (Tolm.) Bocquet

Synonyms
- Gastrolychnis ostenfeldii (A.E.Porsild) Petrovsky; Gastrolychnis taimyrensis (Tolm.) Czerep.; Gastrolychnis triflora subsp. dawsonii (B.L.Rob.) Á.Löve & D.Löve; Lychnis dawsonii (B.L.Rob.) J.P.Anderson; Lychnis taimyrensis ( Tolm. ) Polunin; Lychnis triflora var. dawsonii B.L.Rob.; Melandrium ostenfeldii A.E.Porsild; Melandrium taimyrense Tolm.

Species of flowering plant

Silene taimyrensis, or Taimyr catchfly, is a herbaceous perennial in the family Caryophyllaceae.

== Description and Habitat ==
It is native to the Yukon and British Columbia in Canada and to Alaska. It is found to an elevation of a 1500 meters, growing in exposed subalpine to alpine locations with poor, rocky to sandy soils. It grows to a height of 40 cm in its native habitat and to twice that height as a garden plant; it has small, white to light pink flowers that grow in terminal clusters. S. taimyrensis is known in the fossil record from the Late Pleistocene.
