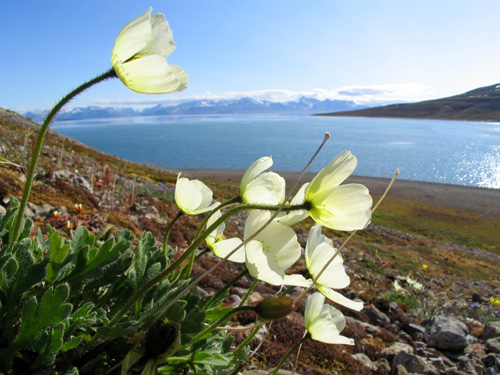

Scientific classification
- Kingdom: Plantae
- Clade: Tracheophytes
- Clade: Angiosperms
- Clade: Eudicots
- Order: Ranunculales
- Family: Papaveraceae
- Genus: Oreomecon
- Species: O. dahliana

Binomial name
- Oreomecon dahliana (Nordh.) Galasso, Banfi & Bartolucci

Synonyms
- Papaver dahlianum; Papaver lujaurense

= Oreomecon dahliana =

Svalbard poppy

Plant species in the poppy family

Oreomecon dahliana, commonly called the Svalbard poppy, is a poppy species common on Svalbard, north-eastern Greenland and a small area of northern Norway. It is the symbolic flower of Svalbard.

It grows to 10–25 cm high, and has long-petiolated basal leaves forming a rosette; the leaves are pinnately dissected and coarsely hirsute. The flowering stems are slender, often arcuate, hirsute. The flower is 2–4 cm in diameter, with four yellow or white, slightly undulate petals, and two boat-shaped sepals, which are densely hirsute with dark brown hairs. The fruit is an obovoid capsule covered with stiff hairs, containing numerous seeds.

The poppy grows on gravel, roadsides, scree sleeps and ledges, and holds the altitude record for flowering plants in Svalbard.

Despite the extreme northern latitude of the Svalbard poppy the species Oreomecon radicata is the most northerly growing plant known to the world, being found on Kaffeklubben Island.
