= C19H19NO4 =

The molecular formula C_{19}H_{19}NO_{4} (molar mass: 325.35 g/mol, exact mass: 325.131408 u) may refer to:

- Amurensine, an alkaloid found in some Papaver species
- Bulbocapnine, an alkaloid
- Cheilanthifoline, an alkaloid found in Corydalis dubia
- Domesticine
- Ro67-4853
