= Ro67-4853 =

Chemical compound

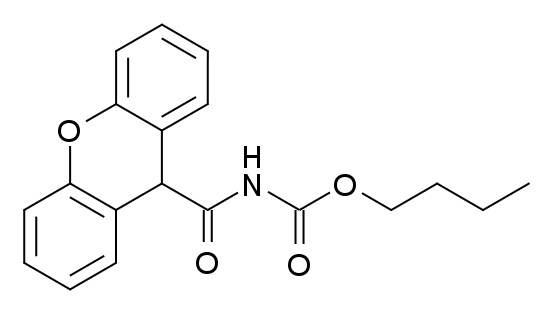

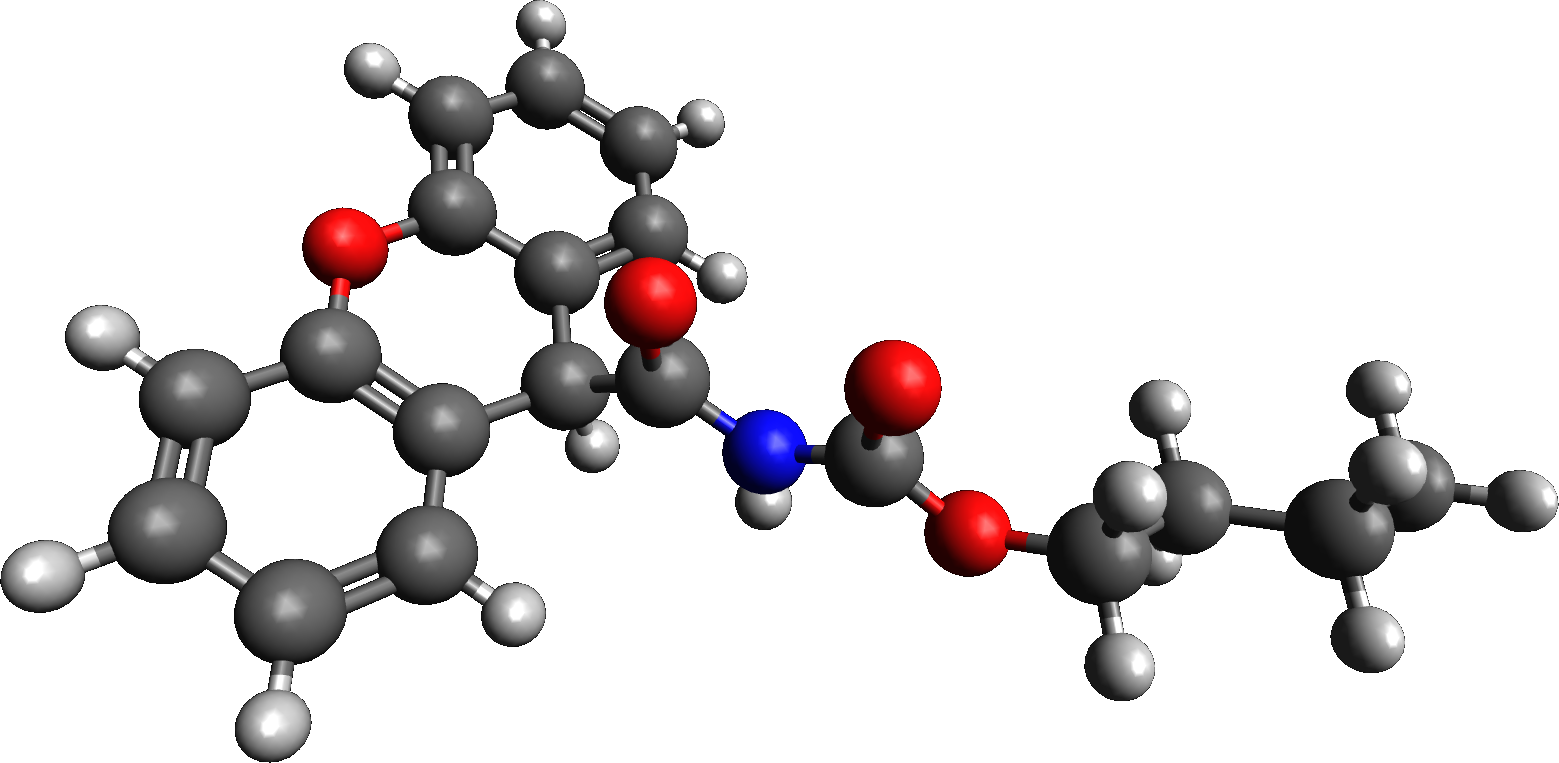

Identifiers
- IUPAC name: butyl (9H-xanthene-9-carbonyl)carbamate
- CAS Number: 302841-89-0
- PubChem CID: 9949202
- IUPHAR/BPS: 1387
- ChemSpider: 8124813
- UNII: QM27L9Q3RZ
- CompTox Dashboard (EPA): DTXSID70433240

Chemical and physical data
- Formula: C_{19}H_{19}NO_{4}
- Molar mass: 325.364 g·mol^{−1}
- 3D model (JSmol): Interactive image
- SMILES: c3cccc2c3Oc1ccccc1C2C(=O)NC(=O)OCCCC
- InChI: InChI=1S/C19H19NO4/c1-2-3-12-23-19(22)20-18(21)17-13-8-4-6-10-15(13)24-16-11-7-5-9-14(16)17/h4-11,17H,2-3,12H2,1H3,(H,20,21,22); Key:RQBUXEUMZZQUFY-UHFFFAOYSA-N

Ro67-4853 is a drug used in scientific research, which acts as a selective positive allosteric modulator for the metabotropic glutamate receptor subtype mGluR_{1}. It was derived by modification of the simpler compound Ro01-6128, and has itself subsequently been used as a lead compound to develop a range of potent and selective mGluR_{1} positive modulators.

== See also ==
C_{19}H_{19}NO_{4}
