= Amurensine =

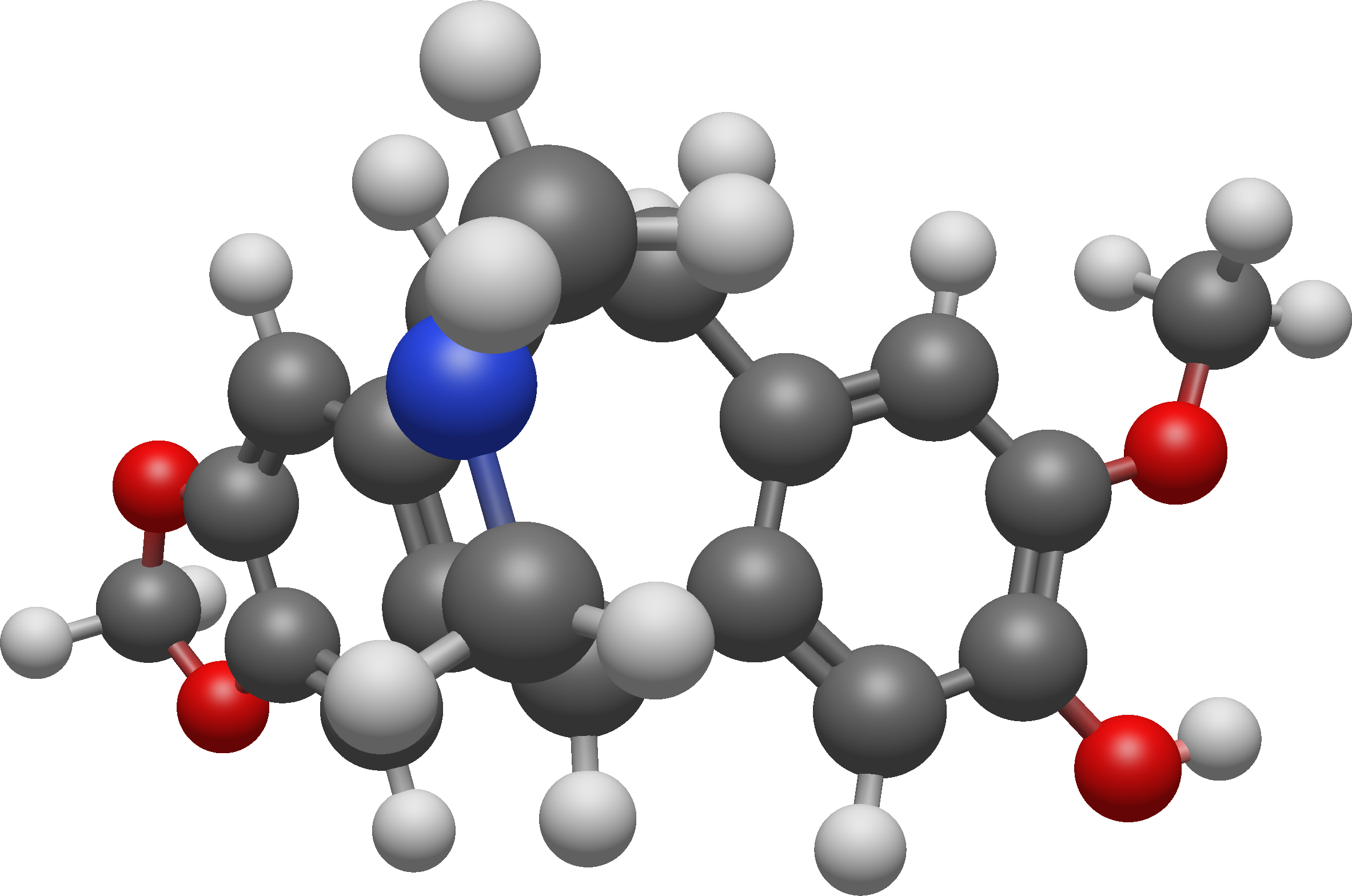

Names
- IUPAC name (1S,11R)-15-Methoxy-19-methyl-5,7-dioxa-19-azapentacyclo[9.7.2.0^{2,10}.0^{4,8}.0^{12,17}]icosa-2,4(8),9,12,14,16-hexaen-14-ol

Identifiers
CAS Number	38695-42-0; 10481-92-2
3D model (JSmol)	Interactive image
ChEBI	CHEBI:2688
ChemSpider	30791186
KEGG	C09333
PubChem CID	442164
CompTox Dashboard (EPA)	DTXSID70331757
- InChI: InChI=1S/C19H19NO4/c1-20-8-14-11-5-16(21)17(22-2)4-10(11)3-15(20)13-7-19-18(6-12(13)14)23-9-24-19/h4-7,14-15,21H,3,8-9H2,1-2H3/t14-,15+/m1/s1 Key: BXWVSGUITWLTOD-CABCVRRESA-N
- SMILES: CN1C[C@@H]2C3=CC(=C(C=C3C[C@H]1C4=CC5=C(C=C24)OCO5)OC)O

Properties
Chemical formula	C_{19}H_{19}NO_{4}
Molar mass	325.364 g·mol^{−1}
- Except where otherwise noted, data are given for materials in their standard state (at 25 °C [77 °F], 100 kPa). Infobox references

Amurensine is an alkaloid found in Papaver species such as P. alpinum, P. pyrenaicum, P. suaveolens, and P. tatricum and P. nudicaule. It is a member of the isoquinoline group.

== See also ==
- C_{19}H_{19}NO_{4}
