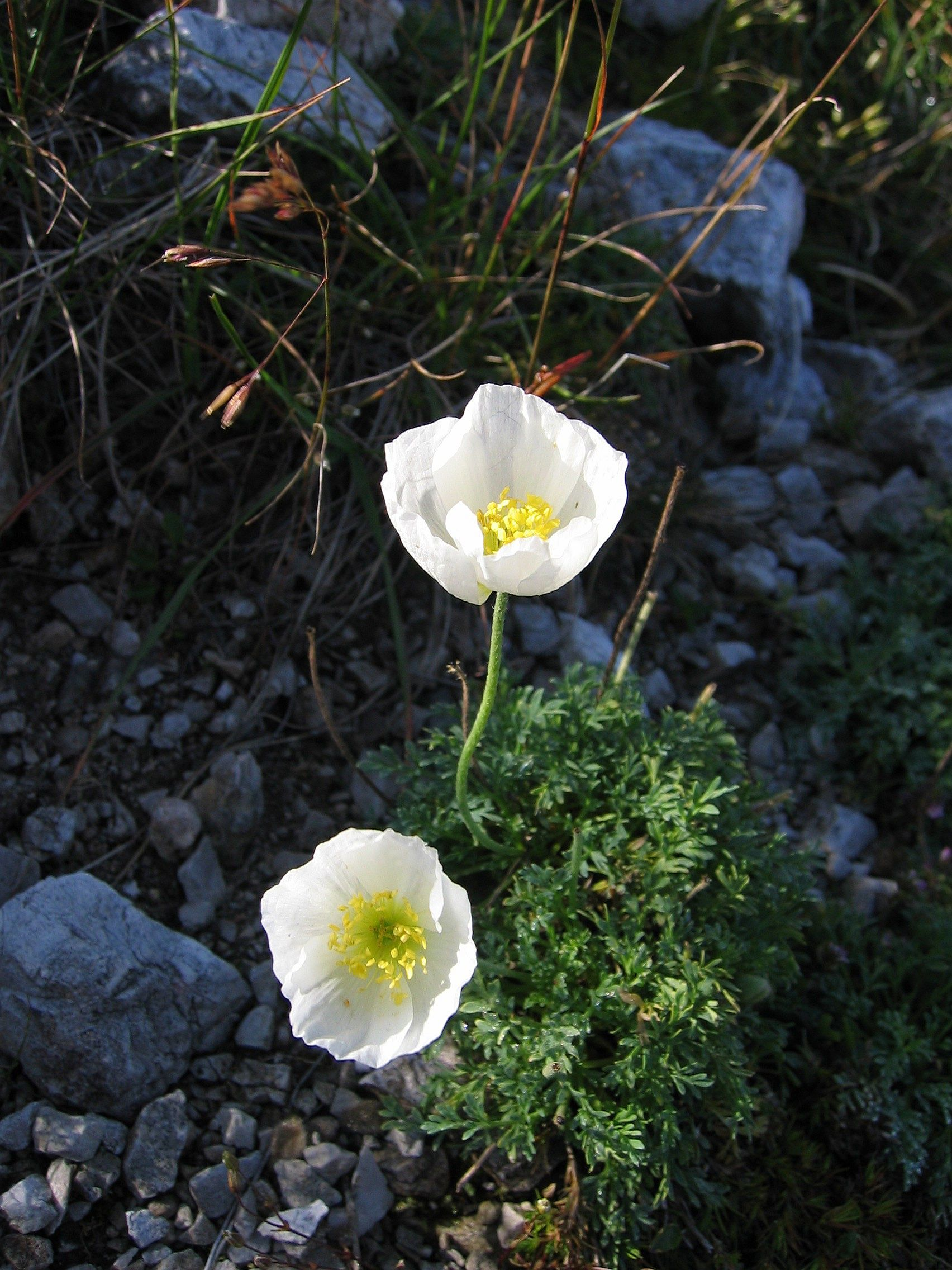
- Oreomecon alpina, syn. Papaver alpinum

Scientific classification
- Kingdom: Plantae
- Clade: Tracheophytes
- Clade: Angiosperms
- Clade: Eudicots
- Order: Ranunculales
- Family: Papaveraceae
- Subfamily: Papaveroideae
- Tribe: Papavereae
- Genus: Oreomecon; Banfi, Bartolucci, J.-M.Tison & Galasso

Synonyms
- Papaver sect. Meconella Spach; Papaver sect. Lasiotrachyphylla (Bernh.) Pfeiff.

= Oreomecon =

Genus of plants

Oreomecon is a genus in the poppy family Papaveraceae. It was established in 2022 for what was previously treated as Papaver sect. Meconella in order to ensure that the genus Papaver was monophyletic.

== Taxonomy ==
Molecular phylogenetic studies of the genus Papaver from 1997 onwards showed that as then circumscribed, the genus was not monophyletic. Three clades could be distinguished within the original circumscription of Papaver: Papaver sensu stricto, Papaver sect. Meconella, and a combination of Papaver sect. Argemonidium and Roemeria. Meconopsis (excluding Meconopsis cambrica) made up a fourth clade, embedded within the original circumscription of Papaver. A 2006 study suggest the four clades were related as shown in the following cladogram:

- - - Papaver sect. Argemonidium + Roemeria (→ Roemeria)
    - - Papaver sect. Meconella (→ Oreomecon)
      - Meconopsis
  - Papaver sensu stricto, including Meconopsis cambrica and Stylomecon

Subsequently, Meconopsis cambrica and Stylomecon were transferred to Papaver, and Roemeria expanded to include Papaver sect. Argemonidium. In 2022, the genus Oreomecon was established and some better known and understood species present in Europe, either natives or alien, were transferred to that genus.

Papaver sect. Meconella could not be raised to the rank of genus under the name Meconella because Meconella Nutt. was already used for a group of American species of poppies, hence a new name was required. Oreomecon is derived from Ancient Greek ὄρος (oros) 'mountain' and μήκων (mēcōn) 'poppy', hence 'mountain poppy'.

=== Species ===
Sources differ in number of species placed in Papaver sect. Meconella (and thus open to transfer to Oreomecon). In 2006, a range of 24 to 30 species was suggested. The Papaver alpinum group has been treated particularly variably, with one to seven or more species accepted, along with numerous subspecies. A 2009 study concluded that "most previous taxonomic concepts of P. alpinum s.l. were highly artificial" and recognized only one species, with possibly two subspecies.

As of December 2025, Plants of the World Online (PoWO) listed the following species:

- Oreomecon alaskana (Hultén) Krivenko, syn. Papaver alaskanum
- Oreomecon alborosea (Hultén) Galasso, Banfi & Bartolucci, syn. Papaver alboroseum
- Oreomecon alpina (L.) Banfi, Bartolucci, J.-M.Tison & Galasso, syn. Papaver alpinum
- Oreomecon ammophila (Turcz.) Krivenko, syn. Papaver ammophilum
- Oreomecon amurensis (N.Busch) Galasso, Banfi & Bartolucci, syn. Papaver amurense
- Oreomecon anadyrensis (V.V.Petrovsky) Krivenko, syn. Papaver anadyrense
- Oreomecon angustifolia (Tolm.) Krivenko, syn. Papaver angustifolium
- Oreomecon anjuica (Tolm.) Krivenko, syn. Papaver anjuicum
- Oreomecon anomala (Fedde) Banfi, Bartolucci, J.-M.Tison & Galasso, syn. Papaver anomalum
- Oreomecon atrovirens (V.V.Petrovsky) Krivenko, syn. Papaver atrovirens
- Oreomecon baitagensis (Kamelin & Gubanov) Krivenko, syn. Papaver baitagense
- Oreomecon calcarea (V.V.Petrovsky) Krivenko, syn. Papaver calcareum
- Oreomecon canescens (Tolm.) Krivenko, syn. Papaver canescens
- Oreomecon chakassica (Peschkova) Krivenko, syn. Papaver chakassicum
- Oreomecon chionophila (V.V.Petrovsky) Krivenko, syn. Papaver chionophilum
- Oreomecon coloradensis (Fedde) Krivenko, syn. Papaver coloradense
- Oreomecon columbiana (Fedde ex Björk) Krivenko, syn. Papaver columbianum
- Oreomecon coreana (Nakai) Krivenko, syn. Papaver coreanum
- Oreomecon corona-sancti-stephani (Zapał.) Grey-Wilson, syn. Papaver corona-sancti-stephani
- Oreomecon crocea (Ledeb.) Banfi, Bartolucci, J.-M.Tison & Galasso, syn. Papaver croceum
- Oreomecon czekanowskii (Tolm.) Krivenko, syn. Papaver czekanowskii
- Oreomecon dahliana (Nordh.) Galasso, Banfi & Bartolucci, syn. Papaver dahlianum
- Oreomecon detritophila (V.V.Petrovsky) Krivenko, syn. Papaver detritophilum
- Oreomecon fauriei (Fedde) Galasso, Banfi & Bartolucci, syn. Papaver fauriei
- Oreomecon gorodkovii (Tolm. & V.V.Petrovsky) Krivenko, syn. Papaver gorodkovii
- Oreomecon hultenii (Knaben) Krivenko, syn. Papaver hultenii
- Oreomecon hypsipetes (V.V.Petrovsky) Krivenko, syn. Papaver hypsipetes
- Oreomecon involucrata (Popov) Galasso, Banfi & Bartolucci, syn. Papaver involucratum
- Oreomecon jacutica (Peschkova) Krivenko, syn. Papaver jacuticum
- Oreomecon jugorica (Tolm.) Krivenko, syn. Papaver jugoricum
- Oreomecon kluanensis (D.Löve) Galasso, Banfi & Bartolucci, syn. Papaver kluanense
- Oreomecon kuvajevii (Schaulo & Sonnikova) Krivenko, syn. Papaver kuvajevii
- Oreomecon labradorica (Fedde) Krivenko, syn. Papaver labradoricum
- Oreomecon laestadiana (Nordh.) Krivenko, syn. Papaver laestadianum
- Oreomecon lapeyrouseana (Gutermann ex Greuter & Burdet) P.P.Ferrer, syn. Papaver lapeyrouseanum
- Oreomecon lapponica (Tolm.) Galasso, Banfi & Bartolucci, syn. Papaver lapponicum
- Oreomecon leiocarpa (Turcz.) Krivenko, syn. Papaver leiocarpum
- Oreomecon leucotricha (Tolm.) Krivenko, syn. Papaver leucotrichum
- Oreomecon lisae (N.Busch) Grey-Wilson, syn. Papaver lisae
- Oreomecon longiscapa (Rändel) Krivenko, syn. Papaver rubroaurantiacum subsp. longiscapum
- Oreomecon luculenta (Björk) Krivenko, syn. Papaver luculentum
- Oreomecon macounii (Greene) Galasso, Banfi & Bartolucci, syn. Papaver macounii
- Oreomecon mcconnellii (Hultén) Krivenko, syn. Papaver mcconnellii
- Oreomecon minutiflora (Tolm.) Krivenko, syn. Papaver minutiflorum
- Oreomecon miyabeana (Tatew.) Banfi, Bartolucci, J.-M.Tison & Galasso, syn. Papaver miyabeanum
- Oreomecon multiradiata (V.V.Petrovsky) Krivenko, syn. Papaver multiradiatum
- Oreomecon nivalis (Tolm.) Krivenko, syn. Papaver nivale
- Oreomecon nudicaulis (L.) Banfi, Bartolucci, J.-M.Tison & Galasso, syn. Papaver nudicaule
- Oreomecon olchonensis (Peschkova) Galasso, Banfi & Bartolucci, syn. Papaver olchonense
- Oreomecon paucistamina (Tolm. & V.V.Petrovsky) Krivenko, syn. Papaver paucistaminum
- Oreomecon polaris (Tolm.) Krivenko, syn. Papaver polare
- Oreomecon popovii (Sipliv.) Galasso, Banfi & Bartolucci, syn. Papaver popovii
- Oreomecon pseudocanescens (Popov) Galasso, Banfi & Bartolucci, syn. Papaver pseudocanescens
- Oreomecon pulvinata (Tolm.) Krivenko, syn. Papaver pulvinatum
- Oreomecon pygmaea (Rydb.) Krivenko, syn. Papaver pygmaeum
- Oreomecon radicata (Rottb.) Banfi, Bartolucci, J.-M.Tison & Galasso, syn. Papaver radicatum
- Oreomecon roseoalba (Björk) Krivenko, syn. Papaver roseoalbum
- Oreomecon rubroaurantiaca (Fisch. ex DC.) Krivenko, syn. Papaver rubroaurantiacum
- Oreomecon saichanensis (Grubov) Krivenko, syn. Papaver saichanense
- Oreomecon schamurinii (V.V.Petrovsky) Krivenko, syn. Papaver schamurinii
- Oreomecon setosa (Tolm.) Krivenko, syn. Papaver setosum
- Oreomecon smirnovii (Peschkova) Krivenko, syn. Papaver smirnovii
- Oreomecon stanovensis (Petroch.) Krivenko, syn. Papaver stanovense
- Oreomecon stubendorfii (Tolm.) Krivenko, syn. Papaver stubendorfii
- Oreomecon tenella (Tolm.) Krivenko, syn. Papaver tenellum
- Oreomecon tianschanica (Popov) Galasso, Banfi & Bartolucci, syn. Papaver tianschanicum
- Oreomecon tolmatscheviana (N.S.Pavlova) Krivenko, syn. Papaver tolmatschevianum
- Oreomecon turczaninovii (Peschkova) Krivenko, syn. Oreomecon turczaninovii
- Oreomecon udocanica (Peschkova) Krivenko, syn. Papaver udocanicum
- Oreomecon variegata (Tolm.) Krivenko, syn. Papaver variegatum
- Oreomecon walpolei (A.E.Porsild) Krivenko, syn. Oreomecon walpolei
