= Ro01-6128 =

Chemical compound

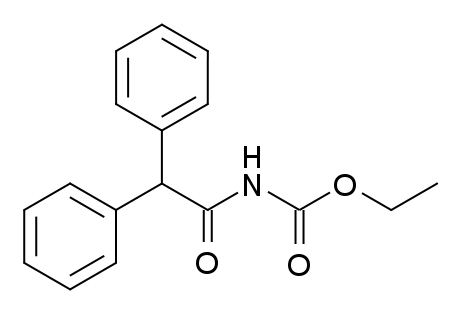

Identifiers
- IUPAC name: ethyl diphenylacetylcarbamate
- CAS Number: 302841-86-7
- PubChem CID: 9903898
- IUPHAR/BPS: 1386
- ChemSpider: 8079552
- UNII: N4LS35GV3Q
- CompTox Dashboard (EPA): DTXSID701028585

Chemical and physical data
- Formula: C_{17}H_{17}NO_{3}
- Molar mass: 283.327 g·mol^{−1}
- 3D model (JSmol): Interactive image
- SMILES: c2ccccc2C(C(=O)NC(=O)OCC)c1ccccc1
- InChI: InChI=1S/C17H17NO3/c1-2-21-17(20)18-16(19)15(13-9-5-3-6-10-13)14-11-7-4-8-12-14/h3-12,15H,2H2,1H3,(H,18,19,20); Key:ILSZPWZFQHSKLW-UHFFFAOYSA-N

Ro01-6128 is a drug used in scientific research, which acts as a selective positive allosteric modulator for the metabotropic glutamate receptor subtype mGluR_{1}. It was derived by modification of a lead compound found via high-throughput screening, and was further developed to give the improved compound Ro67-4853.
