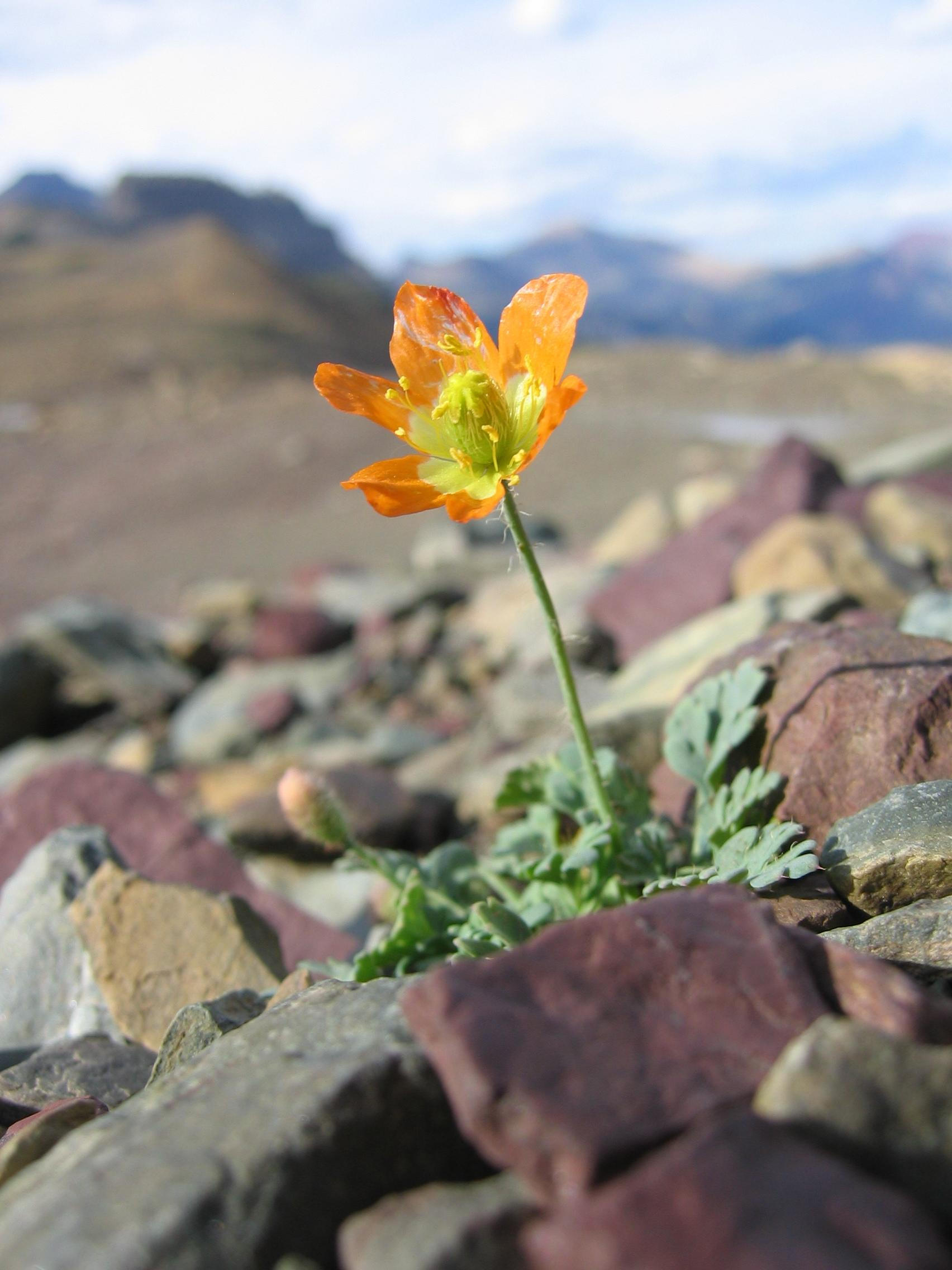
- In Glacier National Park

Conservation status
- Vulnerable (NatureServe)

Scientific classification
- Kingdom: Plantae
- Clade: Tracheophytes
- Clade: Angiosperms
- Clade: Eudicots
- Order: Ranunculales
- Family: Papaveraceae
- Genus: Oreomecon
- Species: O. pygmaea

Binomial name
- Oreomecon pygmaea (Rydb.) Krivenko

Synonyms
- Papaver pygmaeum

= Oreomecon pygmaea =

Subalpine plant species in the poppy family

Oreomecon pygmaea is a species of poppy known by the common name alpine glacier poppy. It is native to North America, where it can be found in British Columbia, Alberta, and Montana. It has a narrow distribution around the intersection of the three borders. There are about 44 known occurrences, mostly in Montana, with about a third in Alberta and two in British Columbia. It is present in a number of locations within Glacier National Park.

This perennial herb produces a stem up to 12 centimeters tall from a taproot. The blue-green leaves are up to 5 centimeters long. The flower is about 2 centimeters wide. The petals are yellow, orange-pink, or orange with a yellow spot. The fruit is a rough-haired capsule about 1.5 centimeters long. Blooming occurs in July and August.

This plant grows in high mountain habitat in alpine climates. It grows on rocky terrain such as talus and fell fields.

== Taxonomy ==
Oreomecon pygmaea was scientifically described in 1902 by Per Axel Rydberg and named Papaver pygmaeum. In 2023 it was moved to the genus Oreomecon by Denis A. Krivenko, giving the species its accepted name. The species has three synonyms.

Table of Synonyms
Name	Year	Rank	Notes
Papaver nudicaule var. pseudocorydalifolium Fedde	1909	variety	= het.
Papaver pygmaeum Rydb.	1902	species	≡ hom.
Papaver radicatum var. pygmaeum (Rydb.) S.L.Welsh	1986	variety	= het., nom. illeg.
Notes: ≡ homotypic synonym ; = heterotypic synonym
