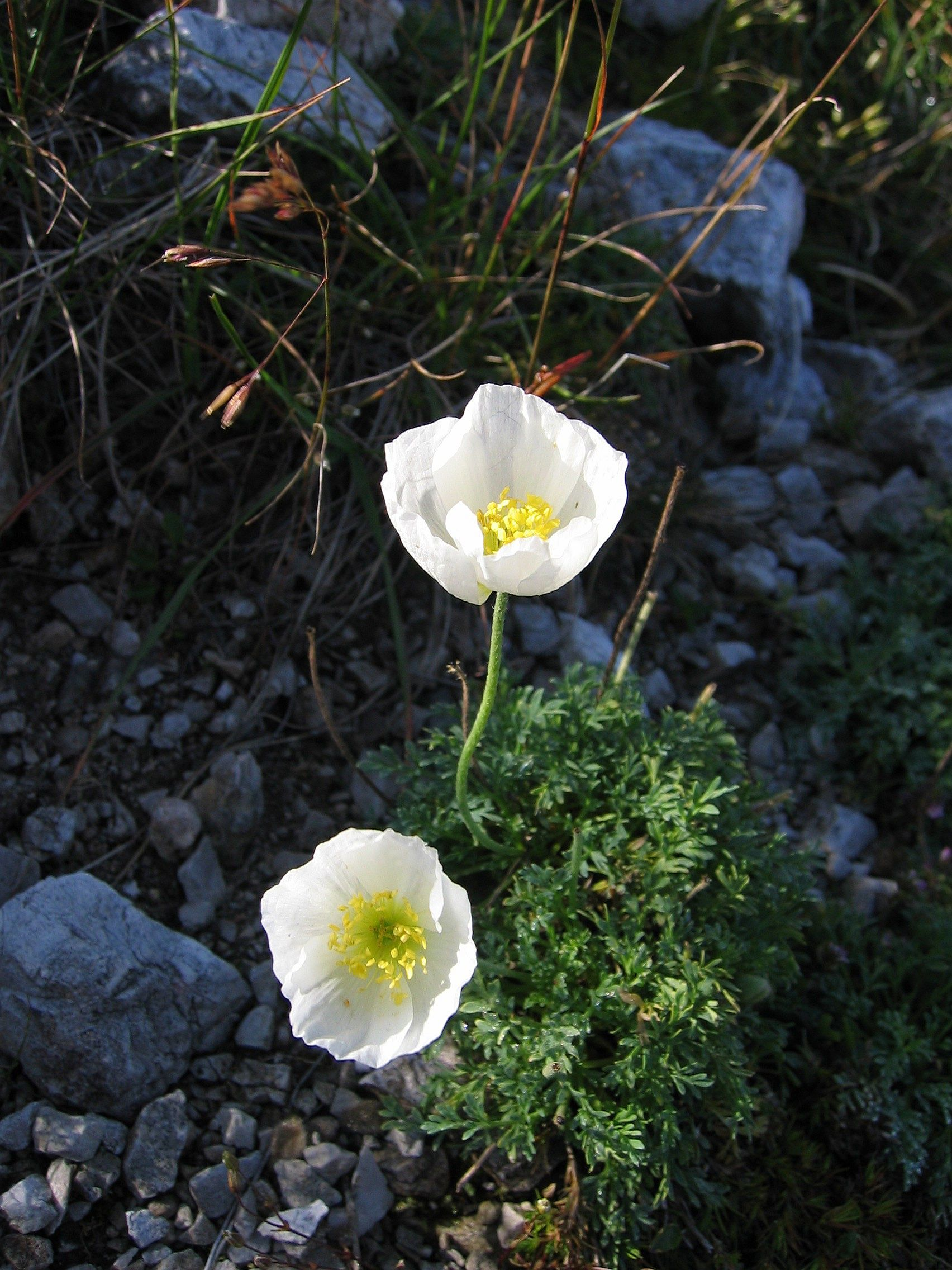

Scientific classification
- Kingdom: Plantae
- Clade: Tracheophytes
- Clade: Angiosperms
- Clade: Eudicots
- Order: Ranunculales
- Family: Papaveraceae
- Genus: Oreomecon
- Species: O. alpina

Binomial name
- Oreomecon alpina (L.) Banfi, Bartolucci, J.-M.Tison & Galasso

Subspecies
- O. a. subsp. alpina; O. a. subsp. fatraemagnae; O. a. subsp. tatrica

Synonyms
- Papaver alpinum; Papaver nudicaule subsp. alpinum

= Oreomecon alpina =

Flowering plant species in the poppy family

Oreomecon alpina, synonym Papaver alpinum, the Alpine poppy or dwarf poppy, is a poppy found in the Alps. The circumscription of the species varies considerably. In some treatments, the species is one of a group of related species, and includes several subspecies, four of which are found in Austria. In other treatments, it includes species that have been treated as separate, and has at most one subspecies.

== Description ==
The Alpine poppy is a short, upright, hairy perennial with all basal leaves. The flower grows to a height of 5 to 25 centimeters, with several upright and hairy stems.

The flowers are hermaphroditic and radially symmetric, with a diameter of 2 to 5 cm. The flower petals are usually white to yellow, but can also be light to quite orange or red. The flowering period is from July to August.

All Alpine poppy subspecies have a strong taproot and make a good rockery plant. The root hairs are angled upwards, which helps secure the plant.

== Taxonomy ==
Oreomecon alpina was given the scientific name Papaver alpinum in 1753 by Linnaeus. It was moved to the new genus Oreomecon in 2021 by Enrico Augusto Banfi, Fabrizio Bartolucci, Jean-Marc Tison, and Gabriele Galasso giving the species its accepted name.

=== Subspecies ===
Three subspecies are accepted according to Plants of the World Online:

- Oreomecon alpina subsp. alpina
  The autonymic subspecies is widespread in Europe from France to Poland and as far south as Bulgaria.
- Oreomecon alpina subsp. fatraemagnae
  Native to just the former Czechoslovakia. It was described for the first time in 2002.
- Oreomecon alpina subsp. tatrica
  This subspecies is limited to just the western Carpathian Mountains. It was first described in 1942.

Oreomecon alpina has a large number of synonyms, 97 according Plants of the World Online, including 16 species.

Table of Synonyms
Name	Year	Rank	Synonym of:	Notes
Oreomecon alpina subsp. degenii (Urum. & Jáv.) Elvebakk & Bjerke	2024	subspecies	subsp. alpina	= het.
Oreomecon alpina subsp. ernesti-mayeri (Markgr.) Elvebakk & Bjerke	2024	subspecies	subsp. alpina	= het.
Oreomecon alpina subsp. kerneri (Hayek) Elvebakk & Bjerke	2024	subspecies	subsp. alpina	= het.
Oreomecon alpina subsp. markgrafiana Elvebakk & Bjerke	2024	subspecies	subsp. alpina	= het., nom. superfl.
Oreomecon alpina subsp. occidentalis (Markgr.) Elvebakk & Bjerke	2024	subspecies	subsp. alpina	= het.
Oreomecon alpina subsp. sendtneri (A.Kern. ex Hayek) Elvebakk & Bjerke	2024	subspecies	subsp. alpina	= het.
Oreomecon alpina subsp. victoris (Škornik. & Wraber) Elvebakk & Bjerke	2024	subspecies	subsp. alpina	= het.
Oreomecon aurantiaca (Loisel.) Elvebakk & Bjerke	2024	species	subsp. alpina	= het.
Oreomecon tatrica (A.Nyár.) Krivenko	2023	species	subsp. tatrica	≡ hom.
Papaver alpinum L.	1753	species	O. alpina	≡ hom.
Papaver alpinum var. albiflorum Hausm.	1851	variety	subsp. alpina	= het., nom. illeg.
Papaver alpinum var. albiflorum W.D.J.Koch	1836	variety	subsp. alpina	= het.
Papaver alpinum f. albiflorum (Hausm.) Asch.	1869	form	subsp. alpina	= het.
Papaver alpinum lusus albiflorum (W.D.J.Koch) Asch.	1869	sport	subsp. alpina	= het.
Papaver alpinum var. album Neilr.	1859	variety	subsp. alpina	= het.
Papaver alpinum var. angustius Markgr.	1958	variety	subsp. alpina	= het.
Papaver alpinum subvar. angustius Markgr.	1958	subvariety	subsp. alpina	= het.
Papaver alpinum var. aurantiacum (Loisel.) Markgr.	1958	variety	subsp. alpina	= het.
Papaver alpinum subvar. aurantiacum (Loisel.) Markgr.	1958	subvariety	subsp. alpina	= het.
Papaver alpinum subvar. biconvex (A.Nyár.) Markgr.	1958	subvariety	subsp. alpina	= het.
Papaver alpinum subsp. burseri (Crantz) Fedde	1909	subspecies	subsp. alpina	= het.
Papaver alpinum var. burseri (Crantz) Bolzon	1914	variety	subsp. alpina	= het.
Papaver alpinum proles burseri (Crantz) Rouy & Foucaud	1893	proles	subsp. alpina	= het.
Papaver alpinum subvar. citrinum Markgr.	1958	subvariety	subsp. alpina	= het.
Papaver alpinum f. decipiens (Rouy & Foucaud) Bolzon	1903	form	subsp. alpina	= het.
Papaver alpinum subsp. degenii (Urum. & Jáv.) Markgr.	1958	subspecies	subsp. alpina	= het.
Papaver alpinum subvar. degenii (Urum. & Jáv.) Markgr.	1958	subvariety	subsp. alpina	= het.
Papaver alpinum subvar. elegans (A.Nyár.) Markgr.	1958	subvariety	subsp. alpina	= het.
Papaver alpinum subsp. ernesti-mayeri Markgr.	1958	subspecies	subsp. alpina	= het.
Papaver alpinum lusus europaeum Regel	1862	sport	subsp. alpina	= het.
Papaver alpinum subvar. fallacinum (Bornm.) Markgr.	1958	subvariety	subsp. alpina	= het.
Papaver alpinum subsp. flaviflorum (W.D.J.Koch) Arcang.	1882	subspecies	subsp. alpina	= het.
Papaver alpinum var. flaviflorum W.D.J.Koch	1835	variety	subsp. alpina	= het.
Papaver alpinum var. flavum Neilr.	1859	variety	subsp. alpina	= het.
Papaver alpinum subf. glabrescens Bolzon	1914	subform	subsp. alpina	= het., nom. illeg.
Papaver alpinum subvar. hirsutum Markgr.	1958	subvariety	subsp. alpina	= het., nom. illeg.
Papaver alpinum subf. hispidum Bolzon	1914	subform	subsp. alpina	= het.
Papaver alpinum subvar. igneum Markgr.	1958	subvariety	subsp. alpina	= het.
Papaver alpinum var. intermedium Schinz & R.Keller	1905	variety	subsp. alpina	= het.
Papaver alpinum subvar. intermedium (Schinz & R.Keller) Markgr.	1958	subvariety	subsp. alpina	= het.
Papaver alpinum var. julicum (E.Mayer & Merxm.) Á.Löve & D.Löve	1974	variety	subsp. alpina	= het.
Papaver alpinum subsp. kerneri (Hayek) Fedde	1909	subspecies	subsp. alpina	= het.
Papaver alpinum var. kerneri (Hayek) Markgr.	1958	variety	subsp. alpina	= het.
Papaver alpinum subvar. kerneri (Hayek) Markgr.	1958	subvariety	subsp. alpina	= het.
Papaver alpinum subvar. lancifolium (A.Nyár.) Markgr.	1958	subvariety	subsp. alpina	= het.
Papaver alpinum var. occidentale Markgr.	1958	variety	subsp. alpina	= het.
Papaver alpinum var. pseudobiconvex A.Nyár.	1942	variety	subsp. alpina	= het.
Papaver alpinum subvar. pseudobiconvex (A.Nyár.) Markgr.	1958	subvariety	subsp. alpina	= het.
Papaver alpinum var. pseudoelegans A.Nyár.	1942	variety	subsp. alpina	= het.
Papaver alpinum subvar. pseudoelegans (A.Nyár.) Markgr.	1958	subvariety	subsp. alpina	= het.
Papaver alpinum subvar. puniceum Markgr.	1958	subvariety	subsp. alpina	= het.
Papaver alpinum subsp. rhaeticum (Leresche) Nyman	1889	subspecies	subsp. alpina	= het., nom. superfl.
Papaver alpinum var. rhaeticum (Leresche) Markgr.	1958	variety	subsp. alpina	= het., nom. superfl.
Papaver alpinum f. rhaeticum (Leresche) Bolzon	1910	form	subsp. alpina	= het.
Papaver alpinum proles rhaeticum (Leresche) Rouy & Foucaud	1893	proles	subsp. alpina	= het.
Papaver alpinum subvar. roseolum (Hayek) Markgr.	1958	subvariety	subsp. alpina	= het.
Papaver alpinum subvar. rubellum Markgr.	1958	subvariety	subsp. alpina	= het.
Papaver alpinum subvar. rubicundum (Bornm.) Markgr.	1958	subvariety	subsp. alpina	= het.
Papaver alpinum subsp. sendtneri (A.Kern. ex Hayek) Schinz & R.Keller	1909	subspecies	subsp. alpina	= het.
Papaver alpinum subvar. sendtneri (A.Kern. ex Hayek) Markgr.	1958	subvariety	subsp. alpina	= het.
Papaver alpinum subvar. subminiatum Markgr.	1958	subvariety	subsp. alpina	= het.
Papaver alpinum subvar. sulphurellum (Widder) Markgr.	1958	subvariety	subsp. alpina	= het.
Papaver alpinum subsp. tatricum A.Nyár.	1942	subspecies	subsp. tatrica	≡ hom.
Papaver alpinum var. tatricum (A.Nyár.) Markgr.	1958	variety	subsp. tatrica	≡ hom.
Papaver alpinum var. widderi Markgr.	1958	variety	subsp. alpina	= het.
Papaver alpinum subvar. widderi Markgr.	1958	subvariety	subsp. alpina	= het.
Papaver aurantiacum Loisel.	1809	species	subsp. alpina	= het.
Papaver burseri Crantz	1763	species	subsp. alpina	= het.
Papaver burseri var. bicolor Rchb.	1838	variety	subsp. alpina	= het.
Papaver burseri var. biconvex A.Nyár.	1942	variety	subsp. alpina	= het.
Papaver burseri var. elegans A.Nyár.	1942	variety	subsp. alpina	= het.
Papaver burseri var. sulphurellum Widder	1932	variety	subsp. alpina	= het.
Papaver decipiens Rouy & Foucaud	1893	species	subsp. alpina	= het.
Papaver degenii (Urum. & Jáv.) Kuzmanov	1970	species	subsp. alpina	= het.
Papaver julicum E.Mayer & Merxm.	1960	species	subsp. alpina	= het.
Papaver kerneri Hayek	1903	species	subsp. alpina	= het.
Papaver lapponicum subsp. occidentale (Markgr.) Knaben	1959	subspecies	subsp. alpina	= het.
Papaver nudicaule subsp. alpinum (L.) Elkan	1839	subspecies	O. alpina	≡ hom.
Papaver nudicaule var. flaviflorum Eklan	1839	variety	subsp. alpina	= het.
Papaver occidentale (Markgr.) H.E.Hess & Landolt	1972	species	subsp. alpina	= het.
Papaver pyrenaicum var. albiflorum (Hausm.) Dalla Torre	1882	variety	subsp. alpina	= het.
Papaver pyrenaicum subsp. aurantiacum (Loisel.) Fedde	1905	subspecies	subsp. alpina	= het.
Papaver pyrenaicum var. aurantiacum (Loisel.) Dalla Torre	1882	variety	subsp. alpina	= het.
Papaver pyrenaicum aurantiacum (Loisel.) Farrer	1919		subsp. alpina	= het.
Papaver pyrenaicum subsp. degenii Urum. & Jáv.	1920	subspecies	subsp. alpina	= het.
Papaver pyrenaicum var. lancifolium A.Nyár.	1942	variety	subsp. alpina	= het.
Papaver pyrenaicum subsp. rhaeticum (Leresche) Fedde	1909	subspecies	subsp. alpina	= het., nom. superfl.
Papaver pyrenaicum var. rubicundum Bornm.	1927	variety	subsp. alpina	= het.
Papaver pyrenaicum subsp. sendtneri (A.Kern. ex Hayek) Fedde	1909	subspecies	subsp. alpina	= het.
Papaver rhaeticum Leresche	1874	species	subsp. alpina	= het.
Papaver sendtneri A.Kern. ex Hayek	1903	species	subsp. alpina	= het.
Papaver sendtneri var. fallacinum Bornm.	1927	variety	subsp. alpina	= het.
Papaver sendtneri var. roseolum Hayek	1908	variety	subsp. alpina	= het.
Papaver suaveolens Lapeyr.	1818	species	subsp. alpina	= het., nom. superfl.
Papaver tatricum (A.Nyár.) Ehrend.	1973	species	subsp. tatrica	≡ hom.
Papaver tatricum subsp. fatraemagnae Bernátová	2002	subspecies	subsp. fatraemagnae	≡ hom.
Papaver victoris Škornik. & Wraber	1988	species	subsp. alpina	= het.
Notes: ≡ homotypic synonym; = heterotypic synonym

== Chemistry ==
The alkaloids amurensine and amurensinine can be found in O. alpina.
