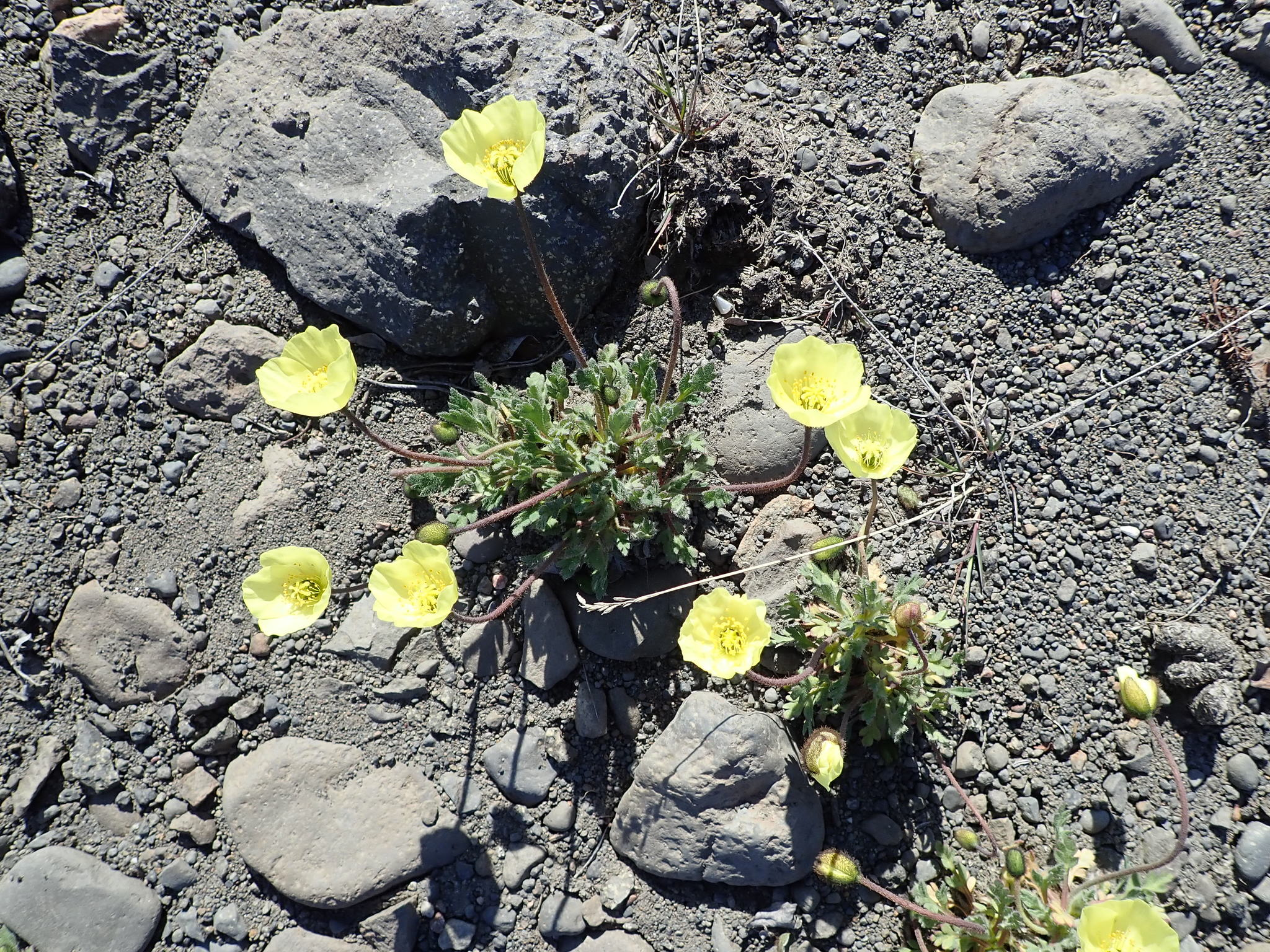

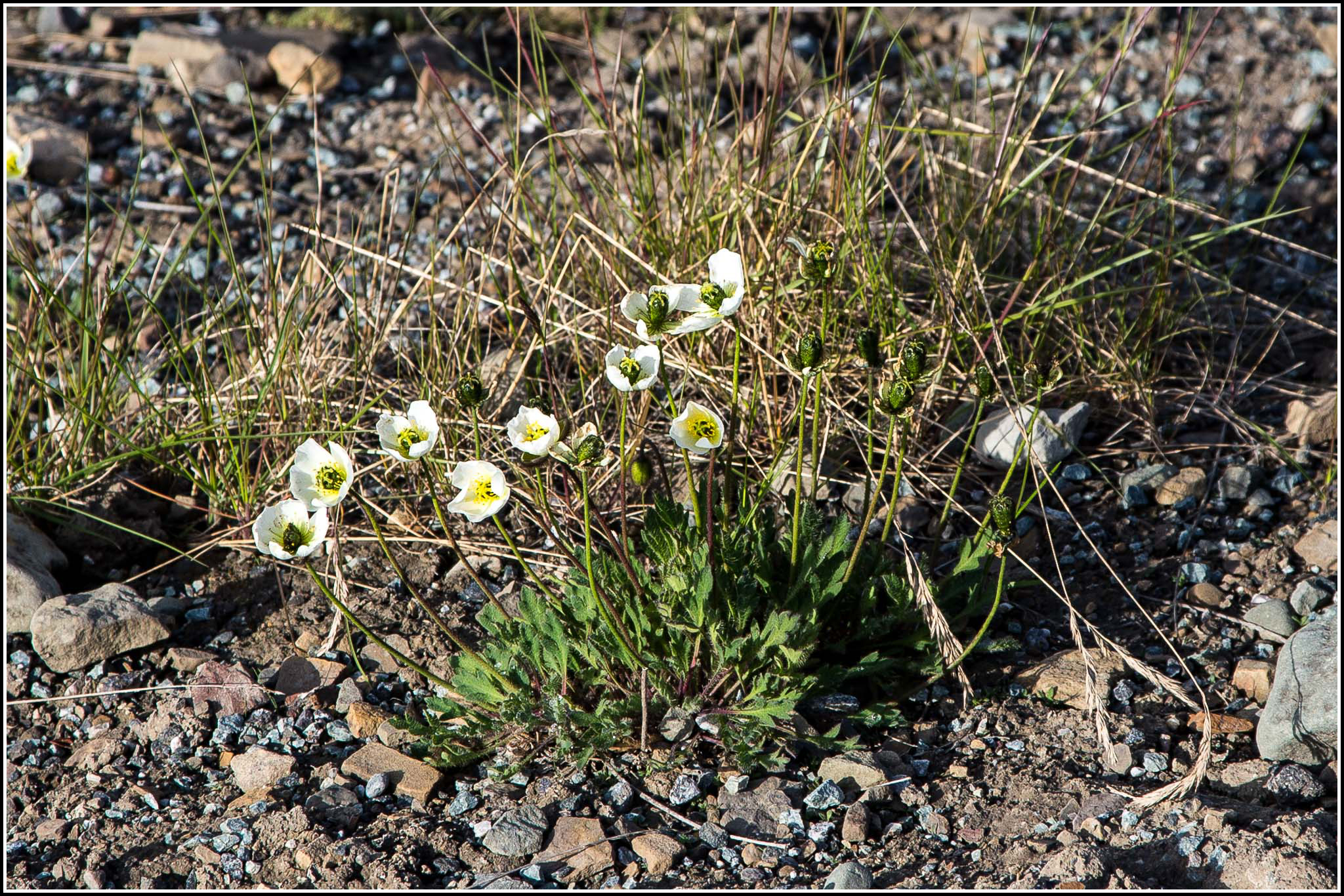

Scientific classification
- Kingdom: Plantae
- Clade: Tracheophytes
- Clade: Angiosperms
- Clade: Eudicots
- Order: Ranunculales
- Family: Papaveraceae
- Genus: Oreomecon
- Species: O. radicata

Binomial name
- Oreomecon radicata (Rottb.) Banfi, Bartolucci, J.-M.Tison & Galasso

Synonyms
- Papaver nudicaule var. radicatum; Papaver nudicaule subsp. radicatum; Papaver radicatum

= Oreomecon radicata =

European plant species in the poppy family

The Arctic poppy (Oreomecon radicata) is a flowering plant in the poppy family. It may also be referred to as rooted poppy or yellow poppy. Arctic poppies grow in cold climate conditions and are found in Arctic regions of Europe. The Arctic poppy has many adaptations, such as heliotropism and physical characteristics, which help them survive in the harsh environment they grow in.

== Taxonomy ==
Oreomecon radicata was given the scientific name Papaver radicatum in 1770 by Christen Friis Rottbøll. In 2021 it was moved to the genus Oreomecon. Together with its genus it is classified in the family Papaveraceae.

The Flora of North America lists four subspecies:

- Papaver radicatum subsp. alaskanum (Hultén) J. P. Anderson
- Papaver radicatum subsp. kluanense (D. Löve) D. F. Murray
- Papaver radicatum subsp. polare Tolmatchew
- Papaver radicatum subsp. radicatum

However, none of these are considered valid by Plants of the World Online. Instead, they are considered to be species named Oreomecon alaskana, Oreomecon kluanensis, and Oreomecon polaris. It has 57 synonyms.

Table of Synonyms
Name	Year	Rank	Notes
Oreomecon radicata var. avkoensis (Knaben) Elvebakk & Bjerke	2024	variety	= het.
Oreomecon radicata var. faeroensis (C.E.Lundstr.) Elvebakk & Bjerke	2024	variety	= het.
Oreomecon radicata subsp. hyperborea (Nordh.) Elvebakk & Bjerke	2024	subspecies	= het.
Oreomecon radicata subsp. knabeniana Elvebakk & Bjerke	2024	subspecies	= het.
Oreomecon radicata var. macrostigma (Nordh.) Elvebakk & Bjerke	2024	variety	= het.
Oreomecon radicata subsp. oeksendalensis (Knaben) Elvebakk & Bjerke	2024	subspecies	= het.
Oreomecon radicata subsp. ovatiloba (Tolm.) Elvebakk & Bjerke	2024	subspecies	= het.
Oreomecon radicata subsp. relicta (C.E.Lundstr.) Elvebakk & Bjerke	2024	subspecies	= het.
Oreomecon radicata subsp. stefanssoniana (Á.Löve) Elvebakk & Bjerke	2024	subspecies	= het.
Oreomecon radicata var. steindorssoniana (Á.Löve) Elvebakk & Bjerke	2024	variety	= het.
Oreomecon radicata subsp. subglobosa (Nordh.) Elvebakk & Bjerke	2024	subspecies	= het.
Papaver nordhagenianum Á.Löve	1955	species	= het.
Papaver nordhagenianum subsp. faeroense (C.E.Lundstr.) Á.Löve	1962	subspecies	= het.
Papaver nordhagenianum subsp. islandicum Á.Löve	1955	subspecies	= het.
Papaver nordhagenianum var. stefanssonii Á.Löve	1950	variety	= het.
Papaver nudicaule var. hartianum Fedde	1909	variety	= het.
Papaver nudicaule var. latilobatum Fedde	1909	variety	= het.
Papaver nudicaule subsp. radicatum (Rottb.) Fedde	1905	subspecies	≡ hom.
Papaver nudicaule var. radicatum (Rottb.) DC.	1821	variety	≡ hom.
Papaver nudicaule subsp. relictum C.E.Lundstr.	1923	subspecies	= het.
Papaver radicatum Rottb.	1770	species	≡ hom.
Papaver radicatum f. albiflorum Hartz	1895	form	= het.
Papaver radicatum subsp. avkoense Knaben	1959	subspecies	= het.
Papaver radicatum subsp. dovrense Nordh.	1931	subspecies	= het.
Papaver radicatum subsp. faeroense C.E.Lundstr.	1923	subspecies	= het.
Papaver radicatum subsp. gjaerevolli Knaben	1959	subspecies	= het.
Papaver radicatum f. glabrifolium Serg.	1931	form	= het.
Papaver radicatum subsp. groevudalense Knaben	1959	subspecies	= het.
Papaver radicatum var. hispidum Serg.	1931	variety	= het.
Papaver radicatum f. humile Serg.	1931	form	= het.
Papaver radicatum subsp. hyperboreum Nordh.	1932	subspecies	= het.
Papaver radicatum subsp. intermedium (Nordh.) Knaben	1959	subspecies	= het.
Papaver radicatum var. intermedium Nordh.	1932	variety	= het.
Papaver radicatum f. latifolium Serg.	1931	form	= het.
Papaver radicatum f. lineatum Serg.	1931	form	= het.
Papaver radicatum f. lobatum Serg.	1931	form	= het.
Papaver radicatum subsp. macrostigma (Nordh.) Nordh.	1940	subspecies	= het.
Papaver radicatum var. macrostigma Nordh.	1932	variety	= het.
Papaver radicatum f. majus Serg.	1931	form	= het.
Papaver radicatum f. normale Serg.	1931	form	≡ hom., not validly publ.
Papaver radicatum subsp. oeksendalense Knaben	1959	subspecies	= het.
Papaver radicatum subsp. ovatilobum Tolm.	1923	subspecies	= het.
Papaver radicatum subsp. relictum (C.E.Lundstr.) Tolm.	1927	subspecies	= het.
Papaver radicatum var. spitzbergense Á.Löve	1955	variety	= het.
Papaver radicatum subsp. stefanssonii Knaben	1959	subspecies	= het.
Papaver radicatum subsp. stefanssonii (Á.Löve) Jonsell & Ö.Nilsson	2000	subspecies	= het., nom. illeg.
Papaver radicatum subsp. steindorssonianum (Á.Löve) Knaben ex Ö.Nilsson	2000	subspecies	= het.
Papaver radicatum subsp. subglobosum Nordh.	1931	subspecies	= het.
Papaver radicatum var. typicum Serg.	ICN,	variety Err:502	
Papaver relictum (C.E.Lundstr.) Nordh.	1931	species	= het.
Papaver relictum subsp. faeroense (C.E.Lundstr.) Á.Löve	1970	subspecies	= het.
Papaver relictum subsp. hyperboreum (Nordh.) Á.Löve & D.Löve	1975	subspecies	= het.
Papaver relictum var. islandicum (Á.Löve) Á.Löve	1970	variety	= het.
Papaver relictum var. stefanssonii Á.Löve	1970	variety	= het.
Papaver relictum var. steindorssonianum (Á.Löve) Á.Löve	1970	variety	= het.
Papaver stefanssonianum Á.Löve	1955	species	= het.
Papaver steindorssonianum Á.Löve	1955	species	= het.
Notes: ≡ homotypic synonym; = heterotypic synonym

== Appearance ==
Arctic poppy leaves grow up to 12 cm long. The leaves are green and lanceolate in shape. The Arctic poppy is known for either their white or yellow flowers; these flowers can grow up to 6.5 cm in diameter. The Arctic poppy stems range from 10 to 15 cm in length. Arctic poppies produce spherical or oval seed pods that are covered by fine hairs.

Arctic poppy petals are covered by black hairs, which along with their cup-shaped petals help to insulate the poppy by trapping heat inside the flower. Hair-like structures are also found covering the stem and sepals of the Arctic poppy. These hairs are used to retain heat and act as insulation against the cold, windy climate conditions that Arctic poppies grow in.

== Distribution ==
The Arctic poppy grows primarily in gravelly, rocky, well-drained soils, but can also grow in meadows. The poppies are circumpolar in distribution, and are found in Arctic and alpine zones within Europe, North America and Asia. In 2023, the Arctic poppy was the northernmost flowering plant in the world, with a northern range limit on Kaffeklubben Island at a latitude of 83°40'N.

== Pollination ==
The Arctic poppy, like many species of flowers, relies on pollination for reproduction. In the early spring, when snow starts to melt, the Arctic poppy blooms. Around the same time, Arctic bumblebees (Bombus polaris) begin their pollination process, making the Arctic bumblebee the main pollinator of Arctic poppies. As spring transitions to summer, bumblebee pollination begins to decline, and flies take over the place of the bumblebee's pollination of Arctic poppies.

== Toxicity ==
Arctic poppies contain alkaloids throughout the entirety of the flower structure, from the stem to the leaves. These alkaloids protect and assist the survival of the Arctic poppy in a number of ways. When Arctic poppies are consumed, the alkaloids within the poppy can affect the central nervous system, protein synthesis, enzyme activity, and membrane transport of the predator. Because of these effects, the Arctic poppy is not a direct food source for many species. Alkaloids are known to act as a growth regulator and can aid in the plant's reproduction rates. Alkaloids can even act as herbicides, which inhibit the growth of competing plants. They also act as substitutes for important minerals, like calcium and potassium, that can be difficult for the Arctic poppies to receive in their environment.

== See also ==
- The Svalbard poppy, another poppy of the extreme north.
- The coat of arms of Nunavut, in which the Arctic poppy appears on.
