= Friedrich Karl Georg Fedde =

German botanist (1873–1942)

- Born: 30 June 1873; Breslau, Germany (now Wrocław, Poland)
- Died: 14 March 1942 (aged 68); Berlin-Dahlem, Germany
- Education: University of Breslau
- Known for: Repertorium Specierum Novarum Regni Vegetabilis
- Scientific career
- Fields: Botany
- Author abbrev. (botany): Fedde

Friedrich Karl Georg Fedde (30 June 1873, Breslau (now Wrocław) – 14 March 1942, Berlin-Dahlem) was a German botanist.

== Biography ==
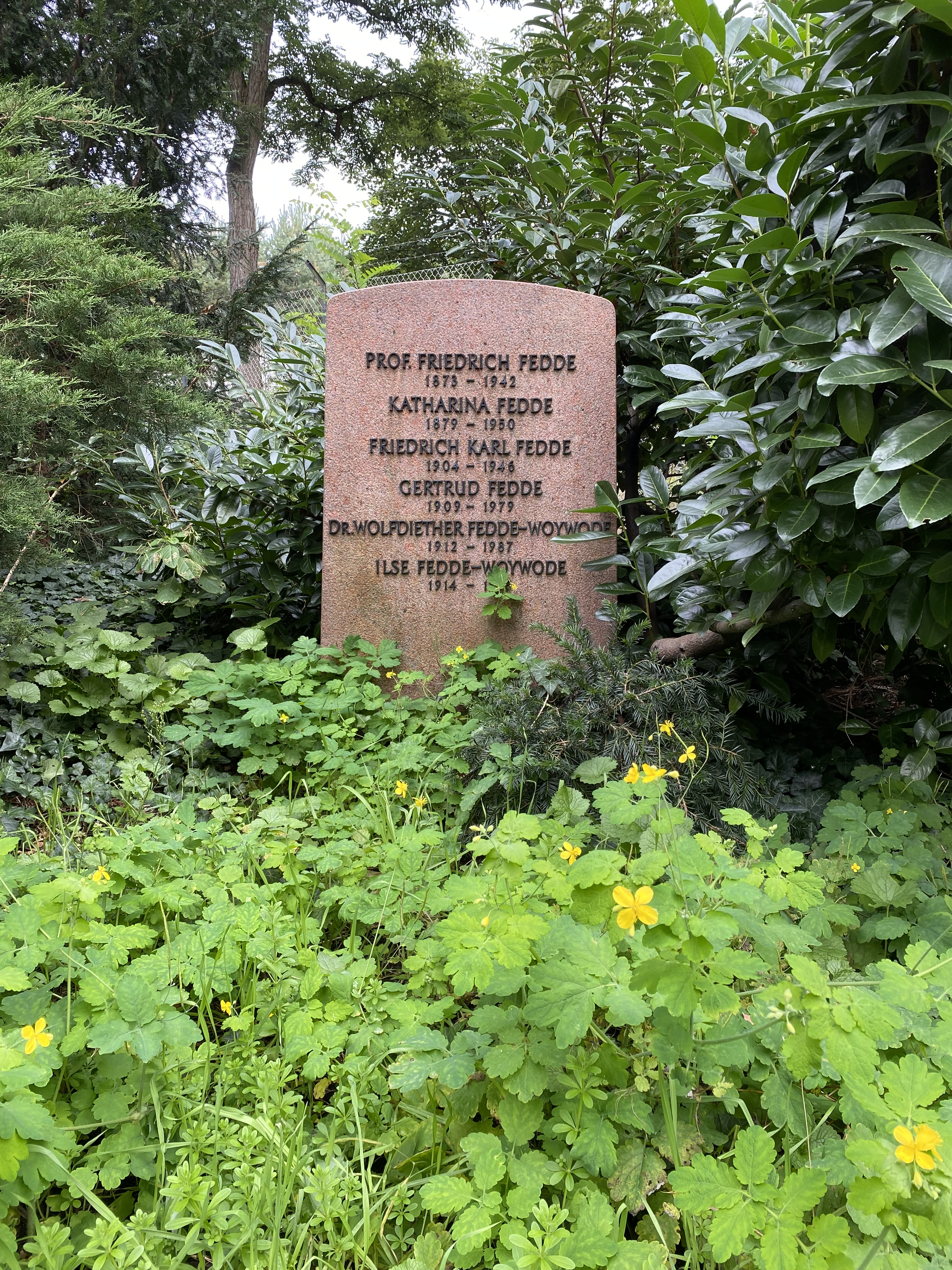
Fedde family grave Dahlem Forest Cemetery on Hüttenweg, Berlin

Fedde studied natural sciences, commencing in 1892 and graduating in 1896 in Breslau. He was a teacher in schools of higher learning in Breslau, Tarnowitz and Berlin. He became an associate at the Berlin Botanical Museum in 1901 and a professor there in 1912. He participated in several collecting trips to the Mediterranean, Finland and South Russia. Fedde's main work dealt with plant systematics and biogeography. His renown rests mainly on the publication of the Repertorium Specierum Novarum Regni Vegetabilis and its Beihefte for longer monographs.

The genus Feddea (Asteraceae) Urb. was named in his honor.

== Publications ==
Extensive bibliography at WorldCat
