= Alexander Tolmachov =

Russian and Soviet botanist (1903-1979)

Alexandr Innokentevich Tolmatchew
- Александр Иннокентьевич Толмачёв
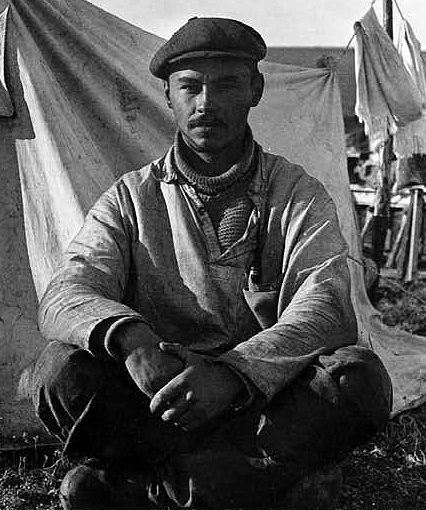
- Tolmatchew, July 1928 near Lake Taymyr
- Born: 21 September 1903; St. Petersburg, Russian Empire
- Died: 16 November 1979; Leningrad, Russian SFSR, Soviet Union
- Scientific career
- Fields: Botany
- Author abbrev. (botany): Tolm.

Alexandr Innokentevich Tolmatchew, also transliterated Tolmachev (Russian: Александр Иннокентьевич Толмачёв) was a twentieth century Russian and Soviet botanist and phytogeographer who was a leading expert in the flora of Russia's Arctic. He is the editor of the important multi-volume set Flora Of The Russian Arctic - A Critical Review Of The Vascular Plants Occurring In The Arctic Region Of The Former Soviet Union, edited by J. G. Packer and translated into English by G. C. D. Griffiths.

Tolmatchew was an expert in the family Juncaceae, and the West Siberian species Luzula tolmatchewii (now called Luzula nivalis) was named after him by Russian Arctic and subarctic botanist Vladimir Borisovich Kuvaev. He was also an expert in some areas of the Brassicaceae (mustard) family, the Caryophyllaceae (carnation) family, the Papaveraceae (poppy) family and the Ranunculaceae (buttercup) family.

Tolmatchew had broad interests in the natural history of the Arctic including its insects, birds and soils. He was appointed head of the USSR's Academy of Sciences Office for the Studies of the Northern Areas in Arkhangelsk in 1939 after serving for a few years as head of its botanical section. He transferred during World War II to the Stalinbad USSR Academy of Sciences offices in Tajikistan, then worked in the early 1950s in the Sakhalin office of the USSR Academy of Sciences, before returning to and settling in Leningrad.

Tomatchew is the son of Russian and Siberian mammoth hunter and paleobotanist Innokenty Pablovich Tolmachoff, who immigrated to the United States in 1918 in the company of American inventor Vladimir K. Zworykin. The difference in spelling of the surnames is due to the time of transliteration, as the son remained in the Soviet Union after his father's emigration.
