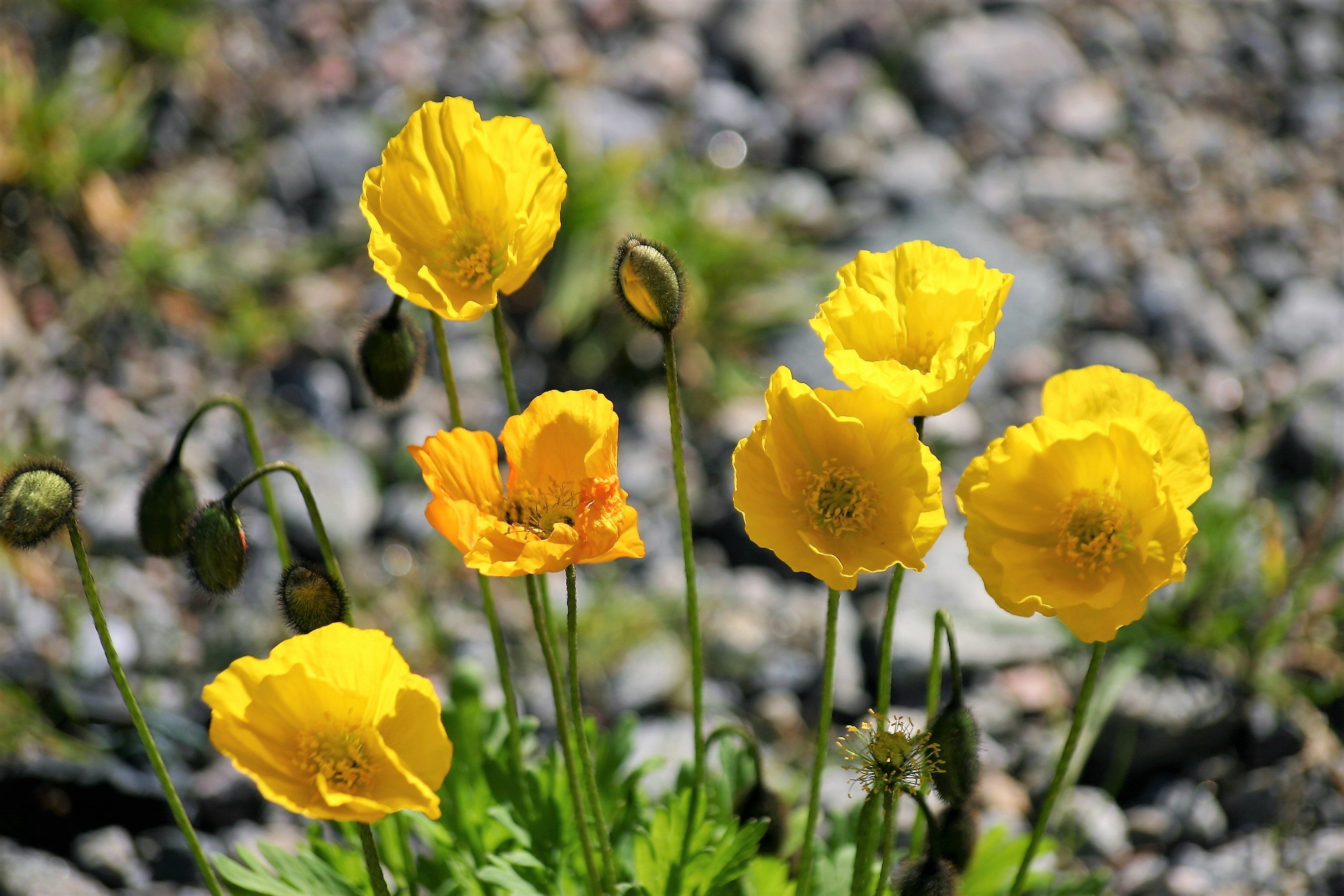

Conservation status
- Apparently Secure (NatureServe)

Scientific classification
- Kingdom: Plantae
- Clade: Tracheophytes
- Clade: Angiosperms
- Clade: Eudicots
- Order: Ranunculales
- Family: Papaveraceae
- Genus: Oreomecon
- Species: O. nudicaulis

Binomial name
- Oreomecon nudicaulis (L.) Banfi, Bartolucci, J.-M.Tison & Galasso

Subspecies
- O. n. subsp. americana; O. n. subsp. microcarpa; O. n. subsp. nudicaulis

Synonyms
- Papaver alpinum subsp. nudicaule (L.) Nyman; Papaver alpinum var. nudicaule (L.) Fisch. & C.A.Mey.; Papaver nudicaule L.; Papaver nudicaule subsp. nudicaule

= Oreomecon nudicaulis =

Species of flowering plant in the poppy family

Oreomecon nudicaulis, synonym Papaver nudicaule, the Iceland poppy, is a boreal flowering plant. It is native to subpolar regions of Asia and the Yukon in North America (but not Iceland), and has been introduced elsewhere (south Argentina, Colorado, Greenland, and Tibet). Iceland poppies are hardy but short-lived perennials, often grown as biennials. They yield large, papery, bowl-shaped, lightly fragrant flowers supported by hairy, 1 foot (30 cm) curved stems among feathery blue-green foliage 1–6 inches long. They were first described by botanists in 1759. The wild species blooms in white or yellow, and is hardy from USDA Zones 3a-10b.

== Taxonomy ==
The first scientific name of Oreomecon nudicaulis was Papaver nudicaule, given to the species in 1753 by Linnaeus. In 2021 the new genus Oreomecon was described by Enrico Augusto Banfi, Fabrizio Bartolucci, Jean-Marc Tison, and Gabriele Galasso including Oreomecon nudicaulis. According to Plants of the World Online (POWO) this is the accepted name of the species, though Papaver nudicaule continues to be used in some sources. In POWO it has three accepted subspecies:

- Oreomecon nudicaulis subsp. americana (Rändel ex D.F.Murray) Elvebakk & Bjerke – In Alaska and the Yukon
- Oreomecon nudicaulis subsp. microcarpa (DC.) Grey-Wilson – Kamchatka and Magadan
- Oreomecon nudicaulis subsp. nudicaulis – Siberia and the Russian Far East

Oreomecon nudicaulis has 44 synonyms of the species or one of its three subspecies.

Table of Synonyms
Name	Year	Rank	Synonym of:	Notes
Oreomecon insularis (V.V.Petrovsky) Chepinoga	2024	species	subsp. nudicaulis	= het.
Oreomecon microcarpa (DC.) Krivenko	2023	species	subsp. microcarpa	≡ hom.
Oreomecon nudicaulis subsp. insularis (V.V.Petrovsky) Elvebakk & Bjerke	2024	subspecies	subsp. nudicaulis	= het.
Oreomecon ochotensis (Tolm.) Elvebakk & Bjerke	2024	species	subsp. microcarpa	= het.
Papaver alpinum var. album Regel	1862	variety	subsp. nudicaulis	= het., nom. illeg.
Papaver alpinum lusus bipinnatisectum Regel	1862	sport	subsp. nudicaulis	= het.
Papaver alpinum lusus glabrescens Regel	1862	sport	subsp. nudicaulis	= het.
Papaver alpinum lusus glabrescens Regel	1862	sport	subsp. nudicaulis	= het.
Papaver alpinum lusus hirsutum Regel	1862	sport	subsp. nudicaulis	= het.
Papaver alpinum lusus hirsutum Regel	1862	sport	subsp. nudicaulis	= het.
Papaver alpinum lusus kamtschaticum Regel	1862	sport	subsp. microcarpa	= het.
Papaver alpinum var. microcarpum (DC.) Ledeb.	1842	variety	subsp. microcarpa	≡ hom.
Papaver alpinum subsp. nudicaule (L.) Nyman	1889	subspecies	O. nudicaulis	≡ hom.
Papaver alpinum var. nudicaule (L.) Fisch. & C.A.Mey.	1837	variety	O. nudicaulis	≡ hom.
Papaver alpinum var. xanthopetaum Trautv.	1860	variety	subsp. nudicaulis	= het.
Papaver insulare (V.V.Petrovsky) Barkalov & Chepinoga	2023	species	subsp. nudicaulis	= het.
Papaver microcarpum DC.	1821	species	subsp. microcarpa	≡ hom.
Papaver microcarpum var. bipinnatifidum (Tolm.) Tolm.	1975	variety	subsp. microcarpa	= het.
Papaver microcarpum subsp. ochotense (Tolm.) Tolm.	1975	subspecies	subsp. microcarpa	= het.
Papaver microcarpum var. xanthopetalum Rändel	1977	variety	subsp. microcarpa	= het., without indication of the type.
Papaver miniatum Rchb.	1830	species	subsp. nudicaulis	= het.
Papaver nudicaule L.	1753	species	O. nudicaulis	≡ hom.
Papaver nudicaule subsp. album Fedde	1909	subspecies	subsp. nudicaulis	= het.
Papaver nudicaule subsp. americanum Rändel ex D.F.Murray	1995	subspecies	subsp. americana	≡ hom.
Papaver nudicaule subsp. baicalense Tolm.	1931	subspecies	subsp. nudicaulis	= het.
Papaver nudicaule subsp. commune Turcz.	1832	subspecies	subsp. nudicaulis	= het.
Papaver nudicaule var. commune (Turcz.) Tolm.	1930	variety	subsp. nudicaulis	= het.
Papaver nudicaule f. gracile Abrom.	1899	form	subsp. nudicaulis	= het.
Papaver nudicaule subsp. insulare V.V.Petrovsky	1983	subspecies	subsp. nudicaulis	= het.
Papaver nudicaule var. kamtschaticum (Regel) Fedde	1909	variety	subsp. microcarpa	= het.
Papaver nudicaule subsp. microcarpum (DC.) Fedde	1909	subspecies	subsp. microcarpa	≡ hom.
Papaver nudicaule var. microcarpum (DC.) J.H.Xue, Chepinoga & K.P.Ma	2024	variety	subsp. microcarpa	≡ hom.
Papaver nudicaule f. patulum Serg.	1931	form	subsp. nudicaulis	= het.
Papaver nudicaule var. pilosum Elkan	1839	variety	subsp. nudicaulis	= het.
Papaver nudicaule f. pygmaea Lange	1887	form	subsp. nudicaulis	= het.
Papaver nudicaule var. riparia V.V.Petrovsky	2003	variety	subsp. nudicaulis	= het.
Papaver nudicaule f. rubriflora Lange	1891	form	subsp. nudicaulis	= het.
Papaver nudicaule f. typicum Serg.	1931	form	O. nudicaulis	≡ hom.
Papaver ochotense Tolm.	1931	species	subsp. microcarpa	= het.
Papaver ochotense var. bipinnatifidum Tolm.	1854	variety	subsp. microcarpa	= het.
Papaver pseudocorydalifolium Fedde	1909	species	subsp. nudicaulis	= het.
Papaver pulvinatum subsp. lenaense Tolm.	2016	subspecies	subsp. nudicaulis	= het.
Papaver pyrenaicum var. puniceum DC.	1821	variety	subsp. nudicaulis	= het.
Papaver radicatum subsp. kamtschaticum (Regel) Fedde	1936	subspecies	subsp. microcarpa	= het.
Notes: ≡ homotypic synonym; = heterotypic synonym

=== Names ===
The Latin specific epithet nudicaulis means "with bare stems". The common name Icelandic poppy is a source of confusion as the species is not native to Iceland or Europe.

== Cultivars ==
Cultivars come in shades of yellow, orange, salmon, rose, pink, cream and white as well as bi-colored varieties. Seed strains include: 'Champagne Bubbles' (15-inch plants in orange, pink, scarlet, apricot, yellow, and creamy-white); 'Wonderland' (10-inch dwarf strain with flowers up to 4 inches wide); 'Flamenco' (pink shades, bordered white, 1 1/2 to 2 feet tall); 'Party Fun' (to 1 foot, said to bloom reliably the first year in autumn and the second spring); 'Illumination' and 'Meadow Pastels' (to 2 feet, perhaps the tallest strains); 'Matador' (scarlet flowers to 5 inches across on 16 inch plants); the perennial 'Victory Giants' with red petals and 'Oregon Rainbows', which has large selfed, bicolor, and picoteed flowers and is perhaps the best strain for the cool Pacific Northwest (elsewhere this strain's buds frequently fail to open).

The dwarf Gartenzwerg group, and the cultivars 'Solar Fire Orange' and 'Summer Breeze Orange' have all won the Royal Horticultural Society's Award of Garden Merit.

Color variations

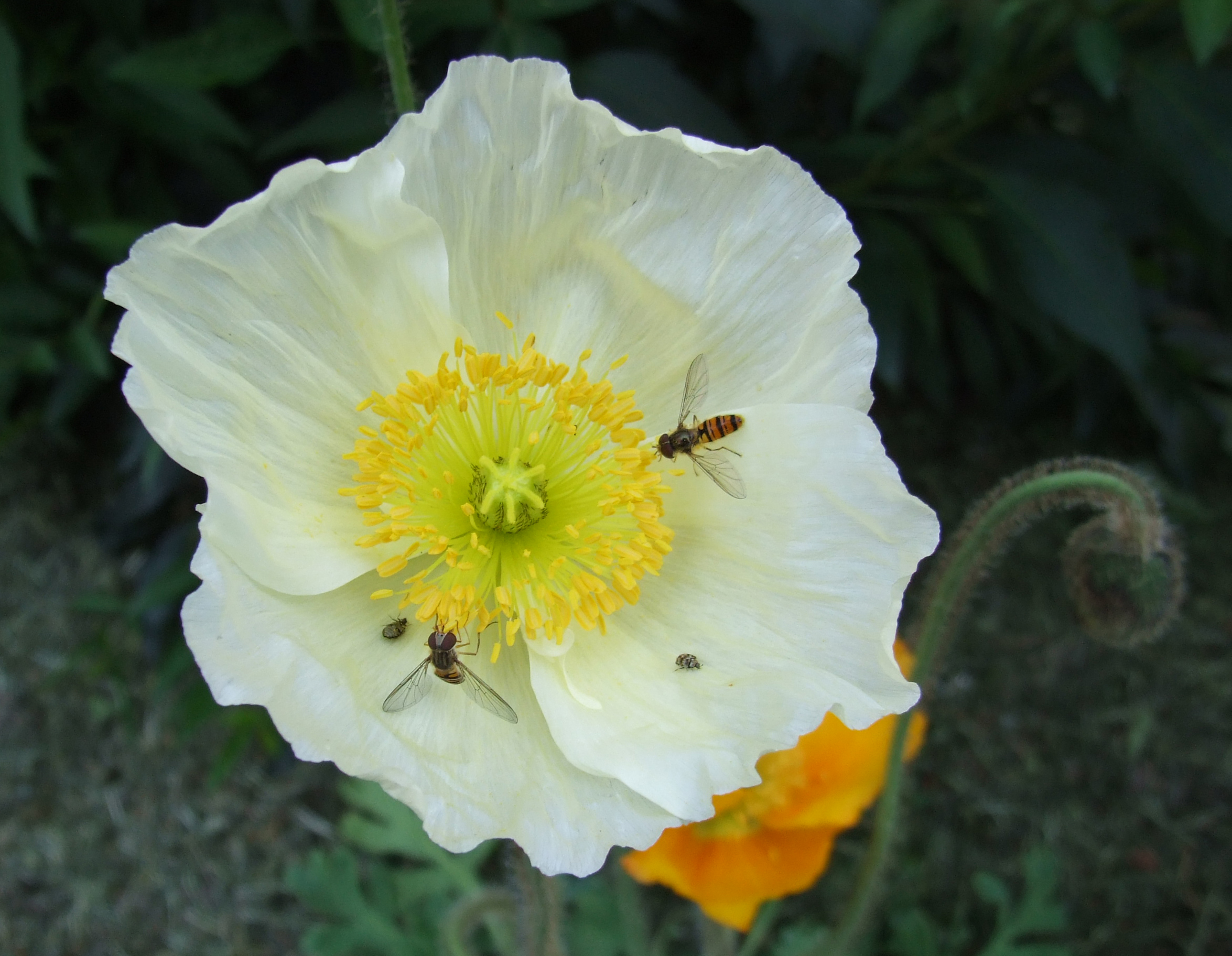
White

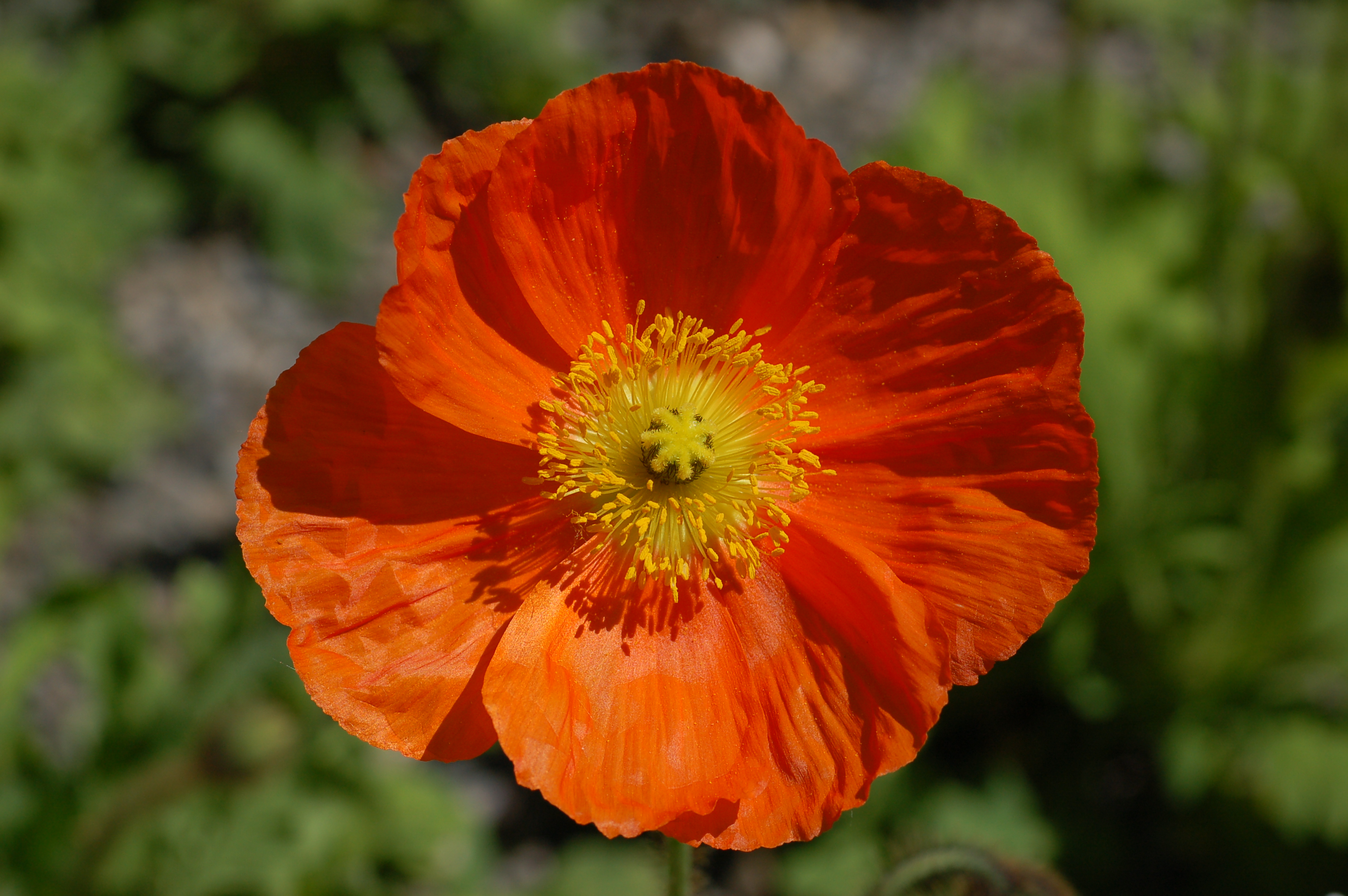
Orange

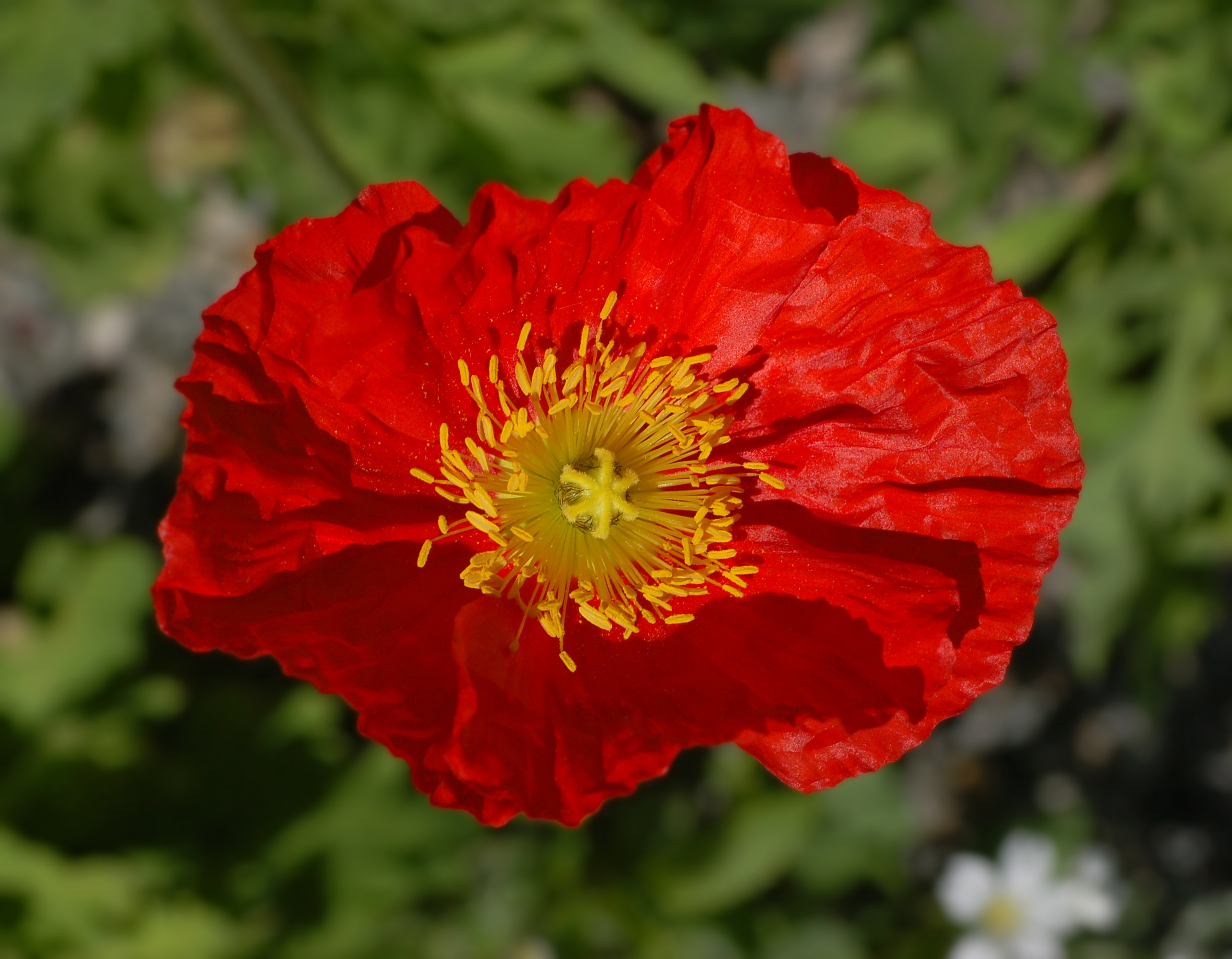
Red

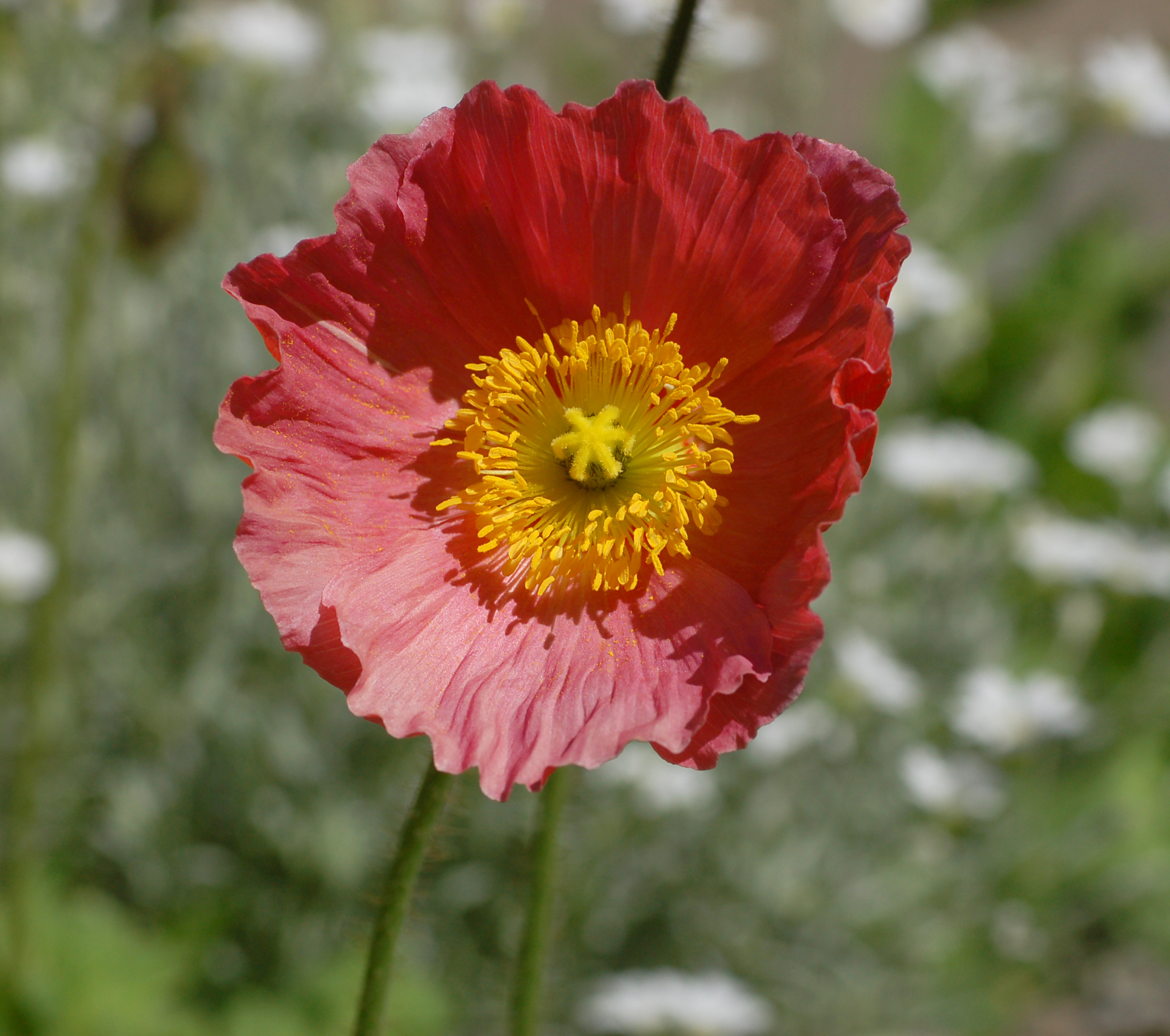
Pink

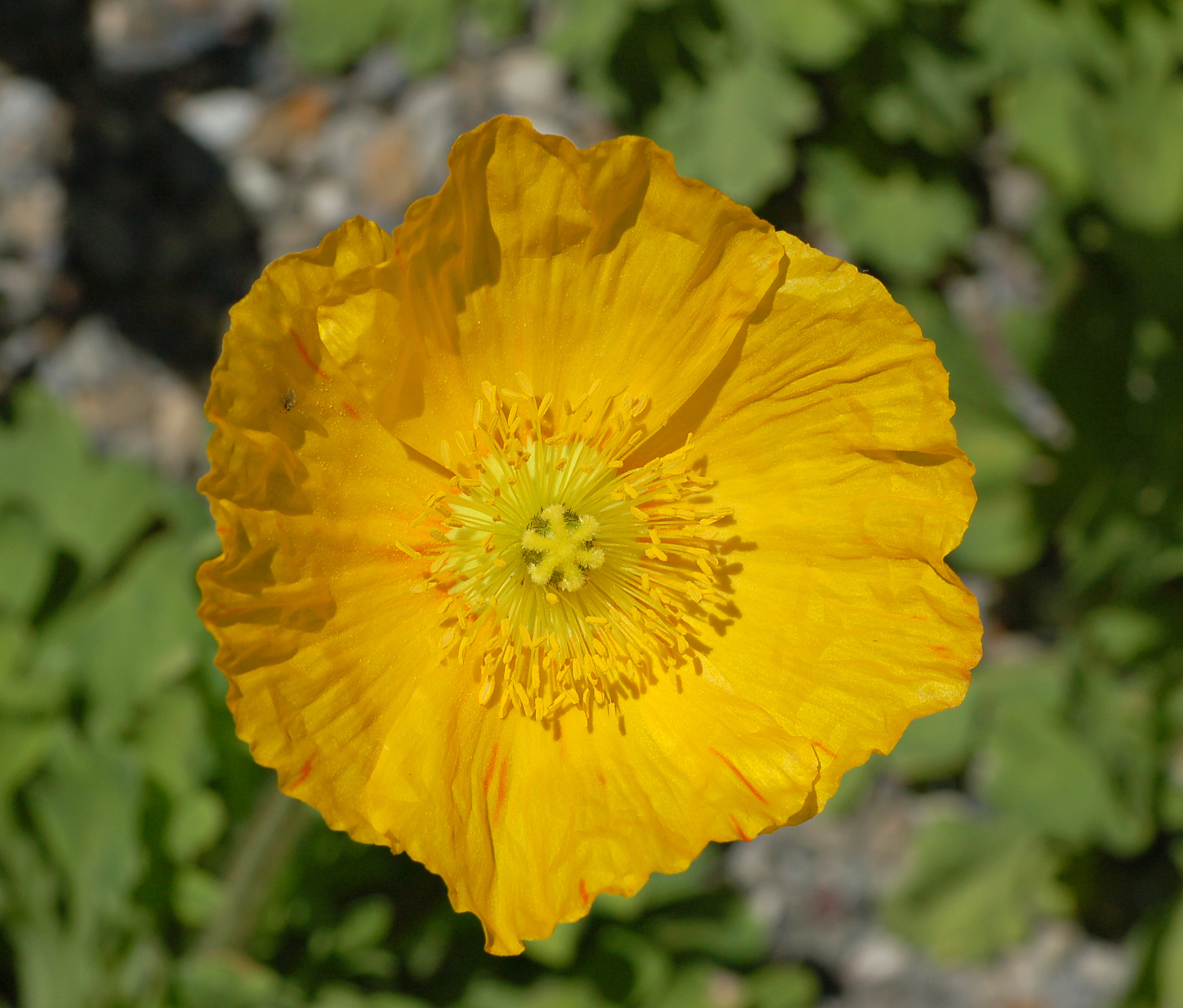
Yellow

White is the dominant color, the others being recessive.

== Cultivation ==
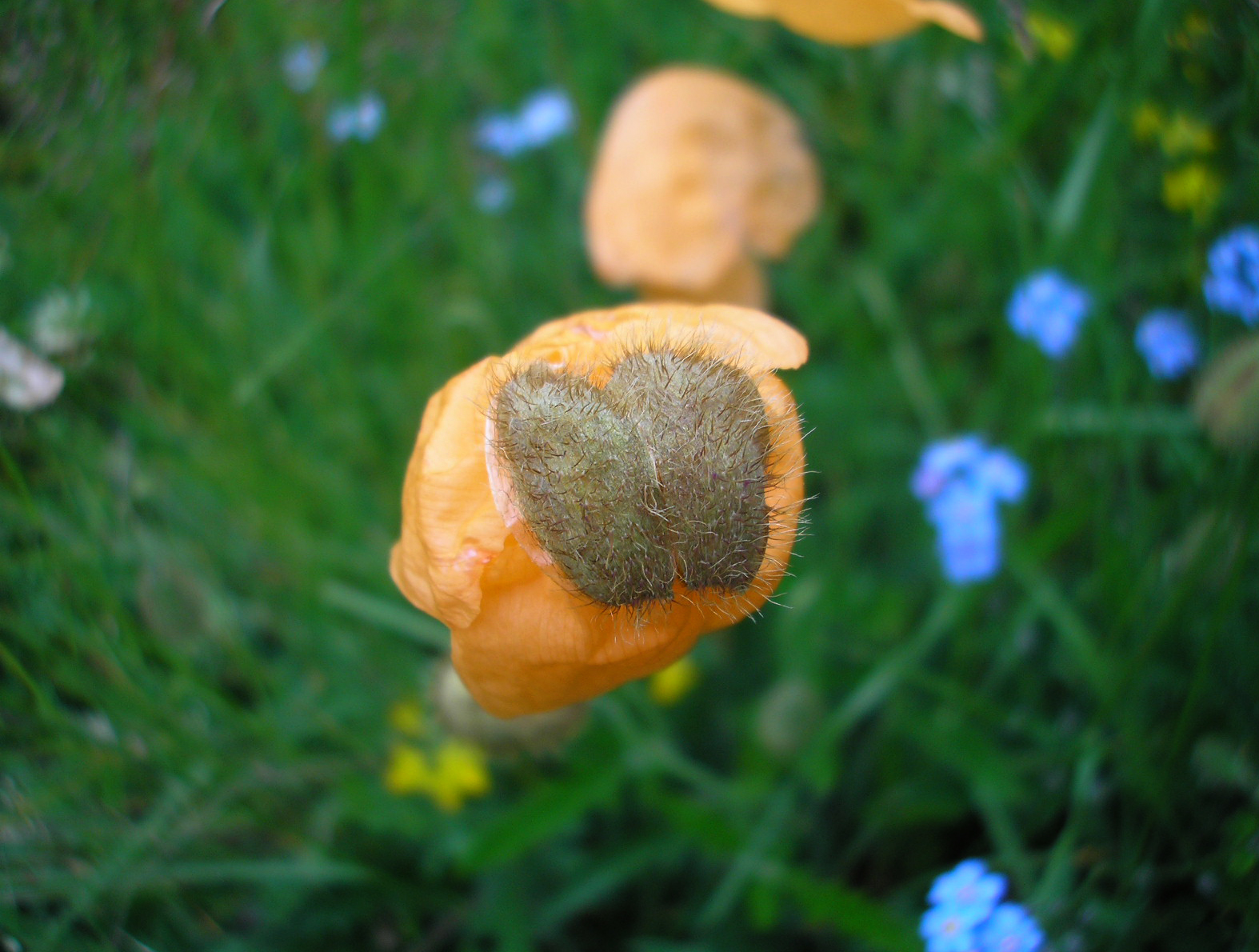
Bud capsule remains on a flower

The plants prefer light, well-drained soil and full sun. The plants are not hardy in hot weather, perishing within a season in hot summer climates.

Iceland poppies, like all poppies, possess exceedingly minute seeds and long taproots that resent disturbance. In cool summer climates on well-drained soils, Iceland poppies can live 2–3 seasons, flowering from early spring to fall.

Iceland poppies are amongst the best poppies for cutting, as they last for several days in the vase.

== Genetics ==
The genetics of the garden forms of O. nudicaulis have been studied, particularly with respect to flower colour. The white flower colour is dominant with respect to yellow. Other colours, such as buff and orange, are recessive.

== Toxicity ==
All parts of this plant are likely to be poisonous, containing (like all poppies) toxic alkaloids. In particular, O. nudicaulis has been shown to contain the benzophenanthidine alkaloid, chelidonine. It also contains (+)-amurine, (-)-amurensinine, (-)-O-methylthalisopavine, (-)-flavinantine and (-)-amurensine.
