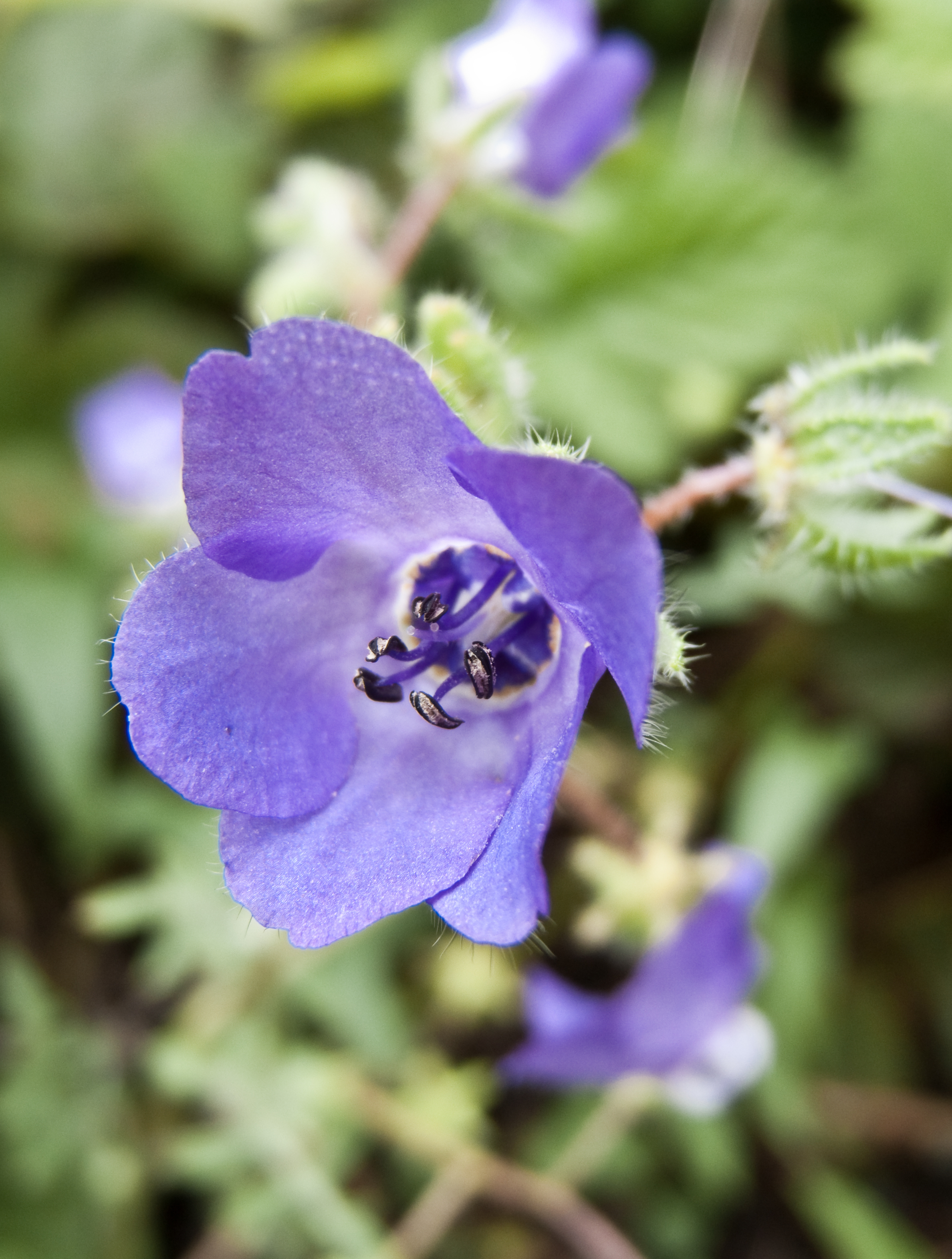

Scientific classification
- Kingdom: Plantae
- Clade: Tracheophytes
- Clade: Angiosperms
- Clade: Eudicots
- Clade: Asterids
- Order: Boraginales
- Family: Hydrophyllaceae
- Genus: Pholistoma
- Species: P. auritum

Binomial name
- Pholistoma auritum (Lindl.) Lilja

= Pholistoma auritum =

Species of flowering plant

Pholistoma auritum is a species of flowering plant in the family Hydrophyllaceae. It is known by the common name blue fiestaflower.

== Distribution ==
It is native to California, southern Nevada, and Arizona, where it can be found in many types of habitat, from mountain talus to coastal bluffs to desert scrub.

== Description ==
Pholistoma auritum is an annual herb with a brittle, fleshy, bristly stem branching profusely, sometimes forming a tangle. The leaves are deeply lobed and toothed and borne on winged petioles. The foliage is coated in hairs and bristles. The inflorescence is made up of one or more widely bell-shaped flowers up to 1.5 centimeters long and 3 wide. The hair-lined flowers are blue to purple with darker markings in the centers.

The purple Arizona fiestaflower, Pholistoma auritum var. arizonicum, is considered a subspecies.
