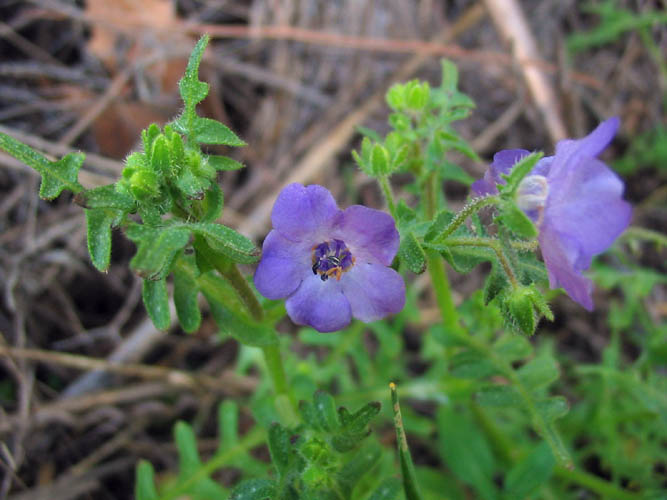
- Pholistoma auritum

Scientific classification
- Kingdom: Plantae
- Clade: Tracheophytes
- Clade: Angiosperms
- Clade: Eudicots
- Clade: Asterids
- Order: Boraginales
- Family: Hydrophyllaceae
- Genus: Pholistoma; Lilja

Species
- 3, see text

= Pholistoma =

Genus of flowering plants

Pholistoma is a small genus of flowering plants in the family Hydrophyllaceae. Species are known generally as fiestaflowers. There are three species, all native to a section of western North America between Oregon and Baja California. They are fleshy annual herbs producing angled bristly or prickly stems with several brittle branches. The deeply lobed, bristly leaves are borne on winged petioles that clasp the stem at their bases. The plants bear rotate flowers in shades of blue, purple, or white depending on species.

== Species ==
As of December 2025, three species were accepted:

- Pholistoma auritum (Lindl.) Lilja - blue fiestaflower
- Pholistoma membranaceum (Benth.) Constance - white fiestaflower
- Pholistoma racemosum (Nutt. ex A.Gray) Constance - racemose fiestaflower
