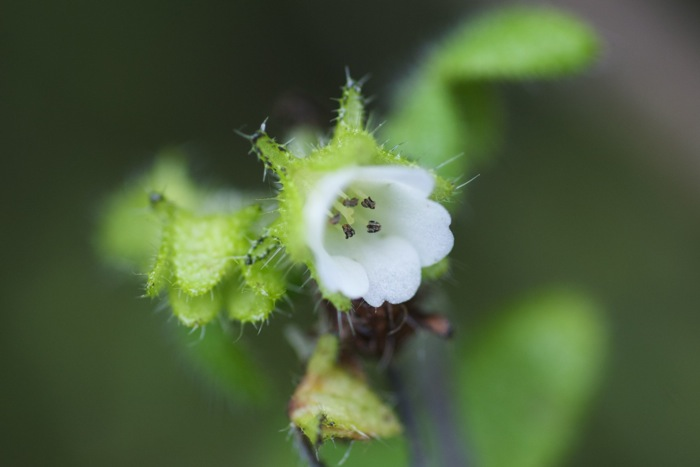

Scientific classification
- Kingdom: Plantae
- Clade: Tracheophytes
- Clade: Angiosperms
- Clade: Eudicots
- Clade: Asterids
- Order: Boraginales
- Family: Hydrophyllaceae
- Genus: Pholistoma
- Species: P. racemosum

Binomial name
- Pholistoma racemosum (Nutt.) Constance

= Pholistoma racemosum =

Species of flowering plant

Pholistoma racemosum is a species of flowering plant in the family Hydrophyllaceae. It is known by the common names racemose fiesta flower, racemed fiestaflower, and San Diego fiestaflower. It is native to southern California, including the Channel Islands, and Baja California, where it can be found in coastal areas and in the coastal mountains and canyons, often in moist, shady areas.

It is an annual herb with a fleshy, bristly stem up to 60 centimeters long and branching profusely, sometimes forming a tangle. The leaves are generally oval or triangular in shape but are deeply lobed or cut and borne on winged petioles. The foliage is coated in rough hairs. The inflorescence bears 2 to 6 flowers each up to a centimeter long and 1.5 wide. The flower is white to blue in color with five rounded lobes.
