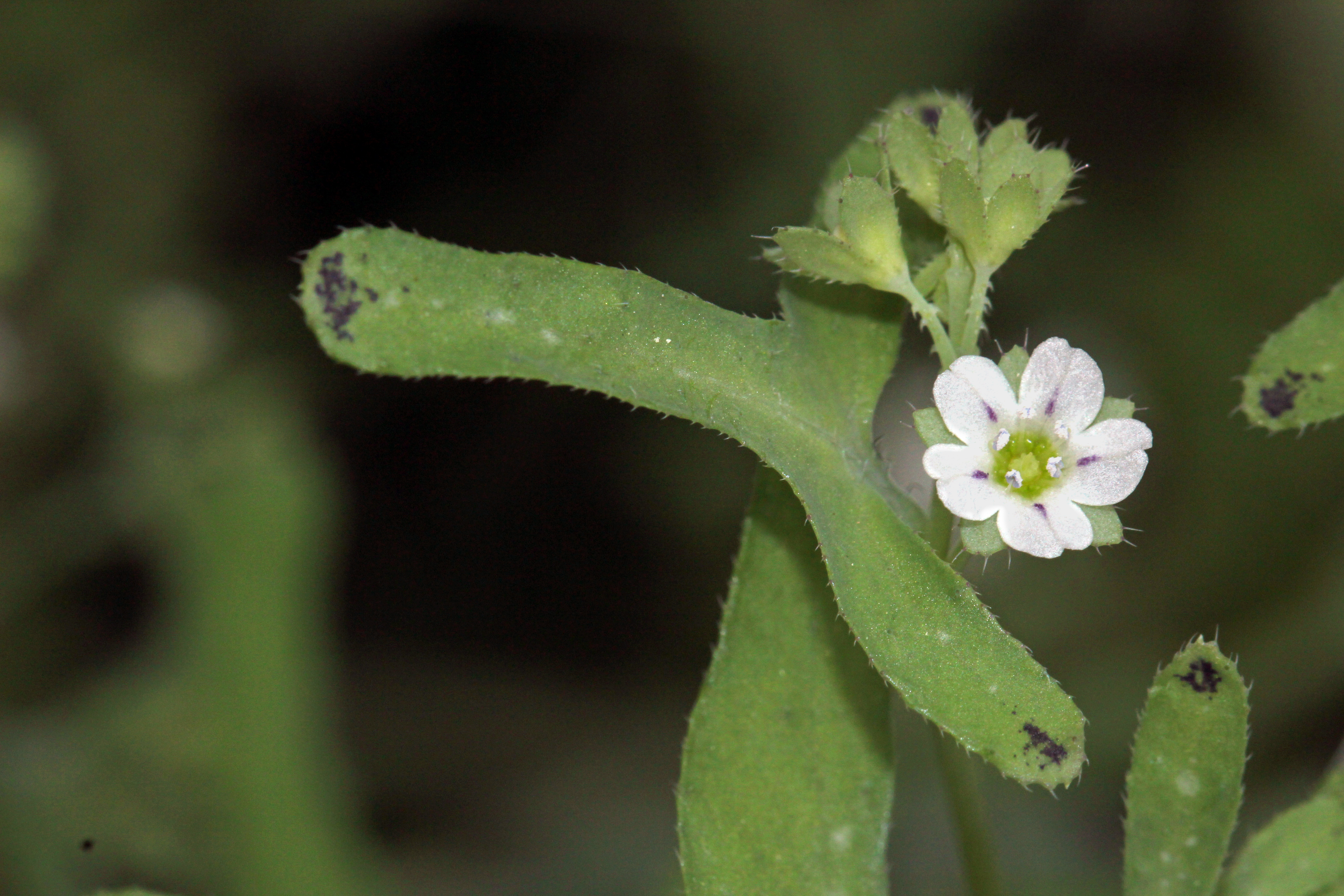

Scientific classification
- Kingdom: Plantae
- Clade: Tracheophytes
- Clade: Angiosperms
- Clade: Eudicots
- Clade: Asterids
- Order: Boraginales
- Family: Hydrophyllaceae
- Genus: Pholistoma
- Species: P. membranaceum

Binomial name
- Pholistoma membranaceum (Benth.) Constance

= Pholistoma membranaceum =

Plant in the borage family

Pholistoma membranaceum is a species of flowering plant in the family Hydrophyllaceae. It is known by the common name white fiesta flower.

It is native to western North America from central California to Baja California. It can be found in many types of habitat from mountain ravines to beaches to desert scrub generally below 4,500 feet (1,400 m) elevation.

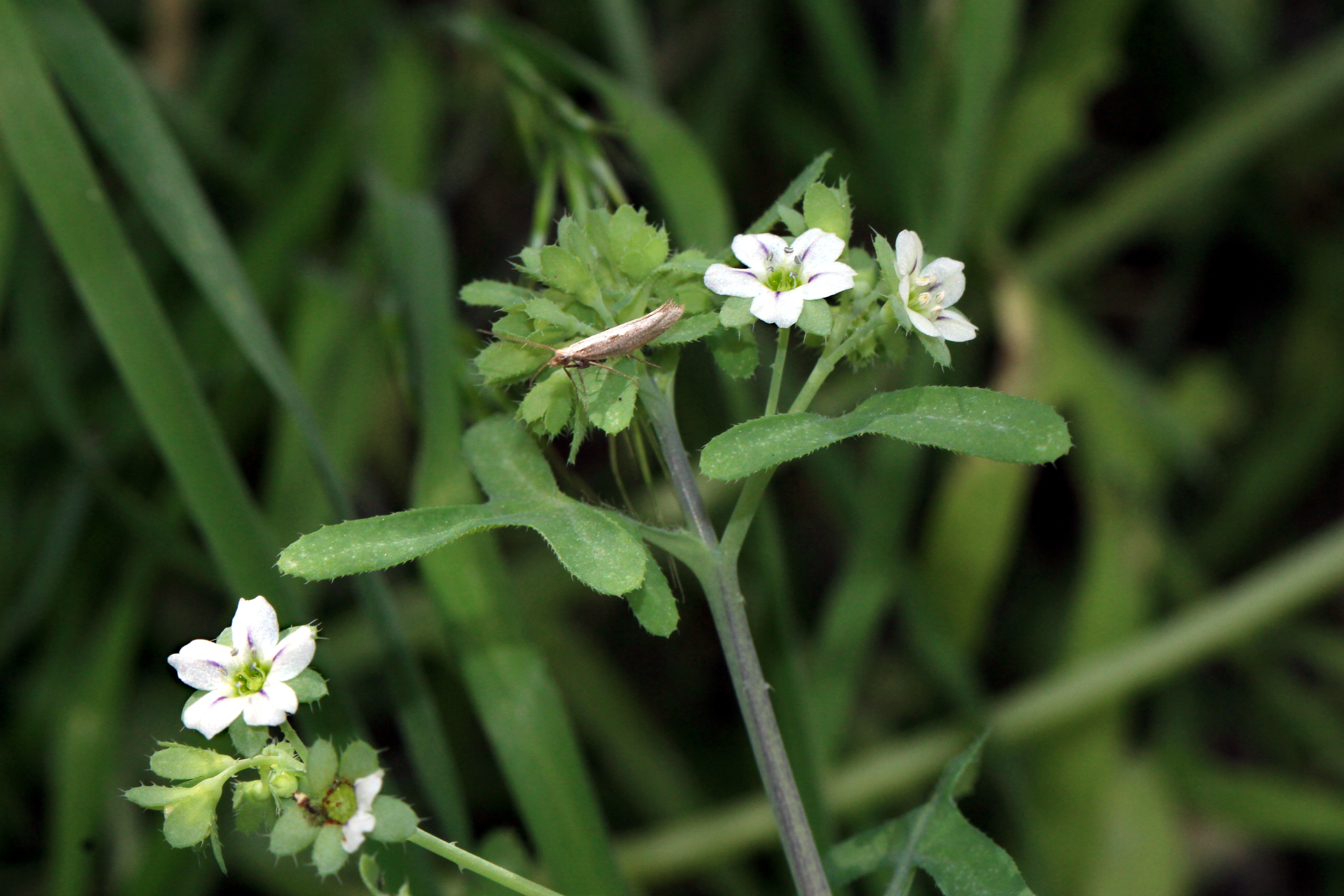
Leaves are deeply lobed or cut.

== Description ==
Pholistoma membranaceum is an annual herb with a waxy, fleshy, bristly stem up to 90 centimeters long and branching profusely, sometimes forming a tangle. The leaves are deeply lobed or cut and borne on winged petioles. The foliage is coated in hairs.

The inflorescence consists of cymes of 2 to 10 flowers each under a centimeter wide. Each pedicel is 5–20 millimetres (0.2–0.8 in). Calyx lobes are oblong and 1–3 millimetres (0.04–0.12 in). The flower is white, usually with a purple spot or streak on each of its five lobes.
