= List of plant genus names with etymologies (D–K) =

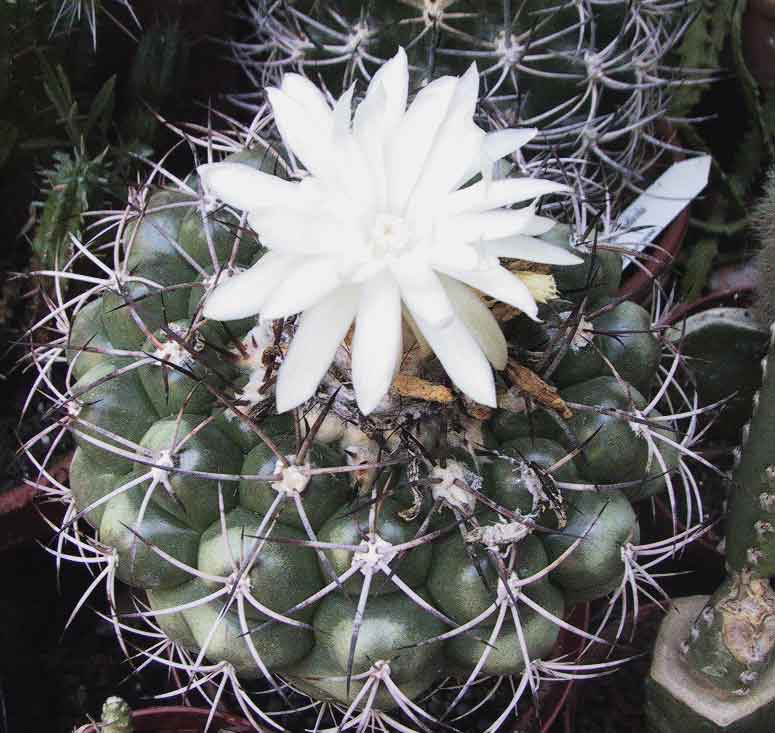
Discocactus

Since the first printing of Carl Linnaeus's Species Plantarum in 1753, plants have been assigned one epithet or name for their species and one name for their genus, a grouping of related species. Many of these plants are listed in Stearn's Dictionary of Plant Names for Gardeners. William Stearn (1911–2001) was one of the pre-eminent British botanists of the 20th century: a Librarian of the Royal Horticultural Society, a president of the Linnean Society and the original drafter of the International Code of Nomenclature for Cultivated Plants.

The first column below contains seed-bearing genera from Stearn and other sources as listed, excluding those names that no longer appear in more modern works, such as Plants of the World by Maarten J. M. Christenhusz (lead author), Michael F. Fay and Mark W. Chase. Plants of the World is also used for the family and order classification for each genus. The second column gives a meaning or derivation of the word, such as a language of origin. The last two columns indicate additional citations.

== Key ==
Latin: = derived from Latin (otherwise Greek, except as noted)
Ba = listed in Ross Bayton's The Gardener's Botanical
Bu = listed in Lotte Burkhardt's Index of Eponymic Plant Names
CS = listed in both Allen Coombes's The A to Z of Plant Names and Stearn's Dictionary of Plant Names for Gardeners
G = listed in David Gledhill's The Names of Plants
St = listed in Stearn's Dictionary of Plant Names for Gardeners

== Genera ==
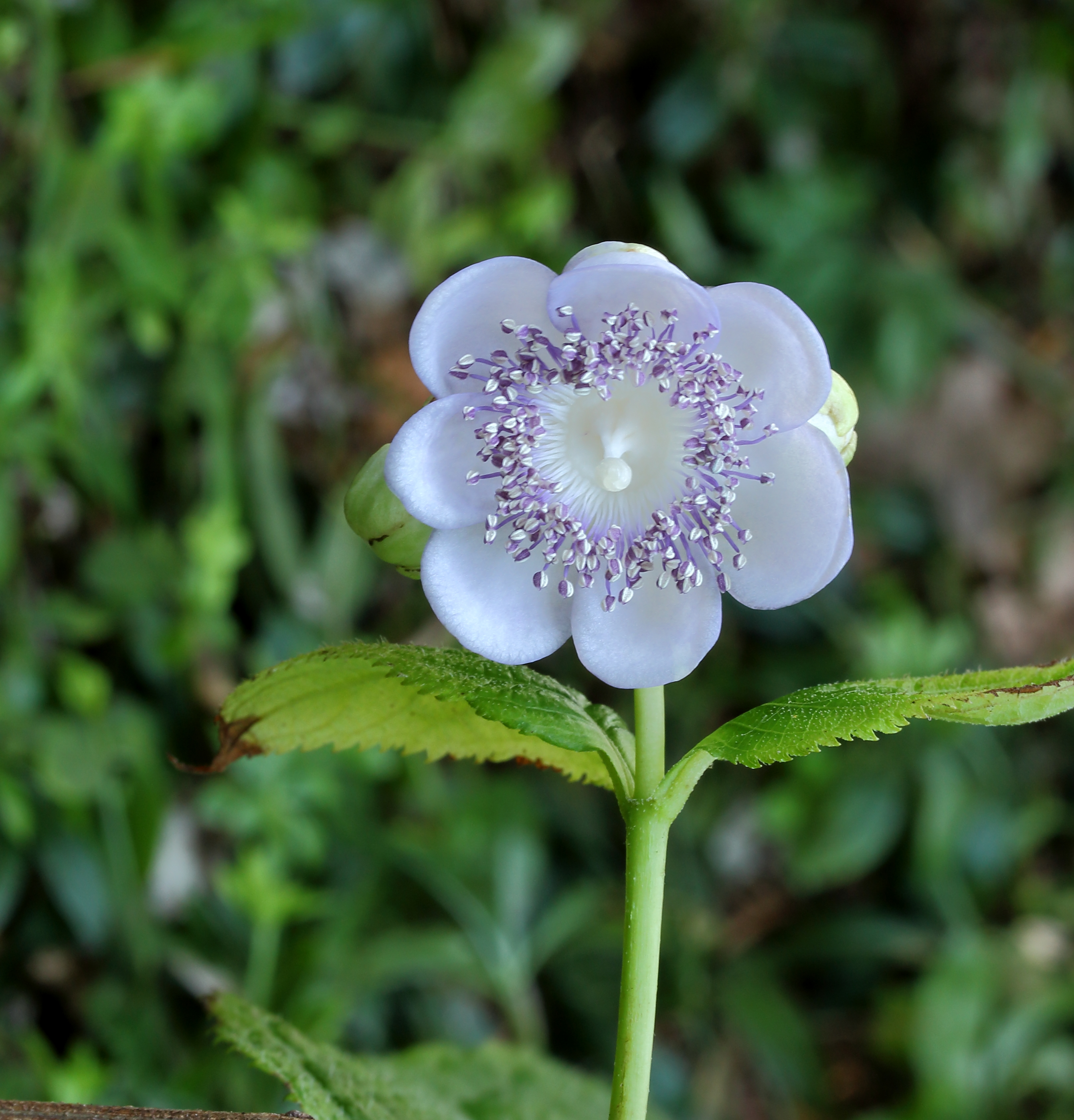
Deinanthe

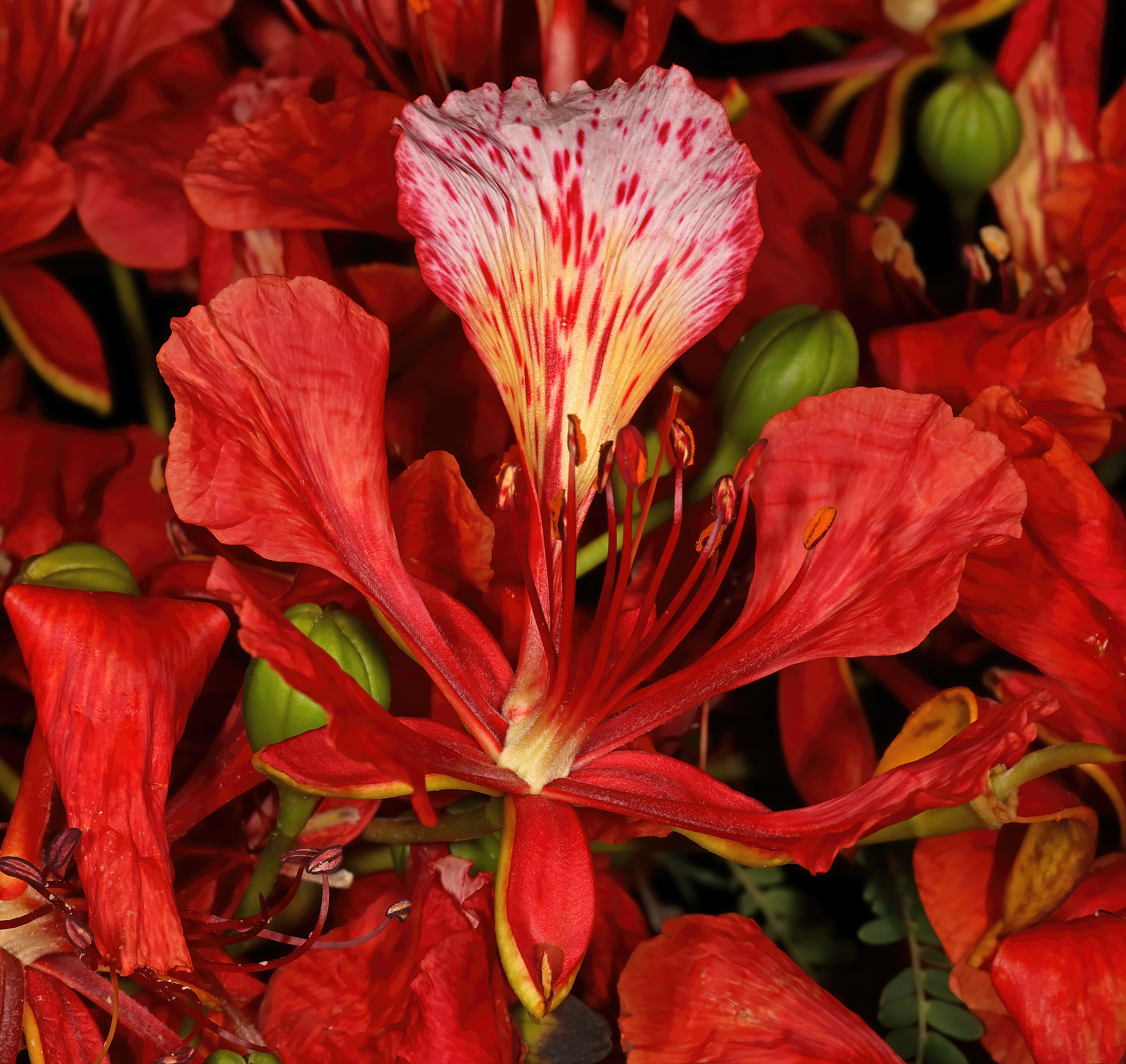
Delonix

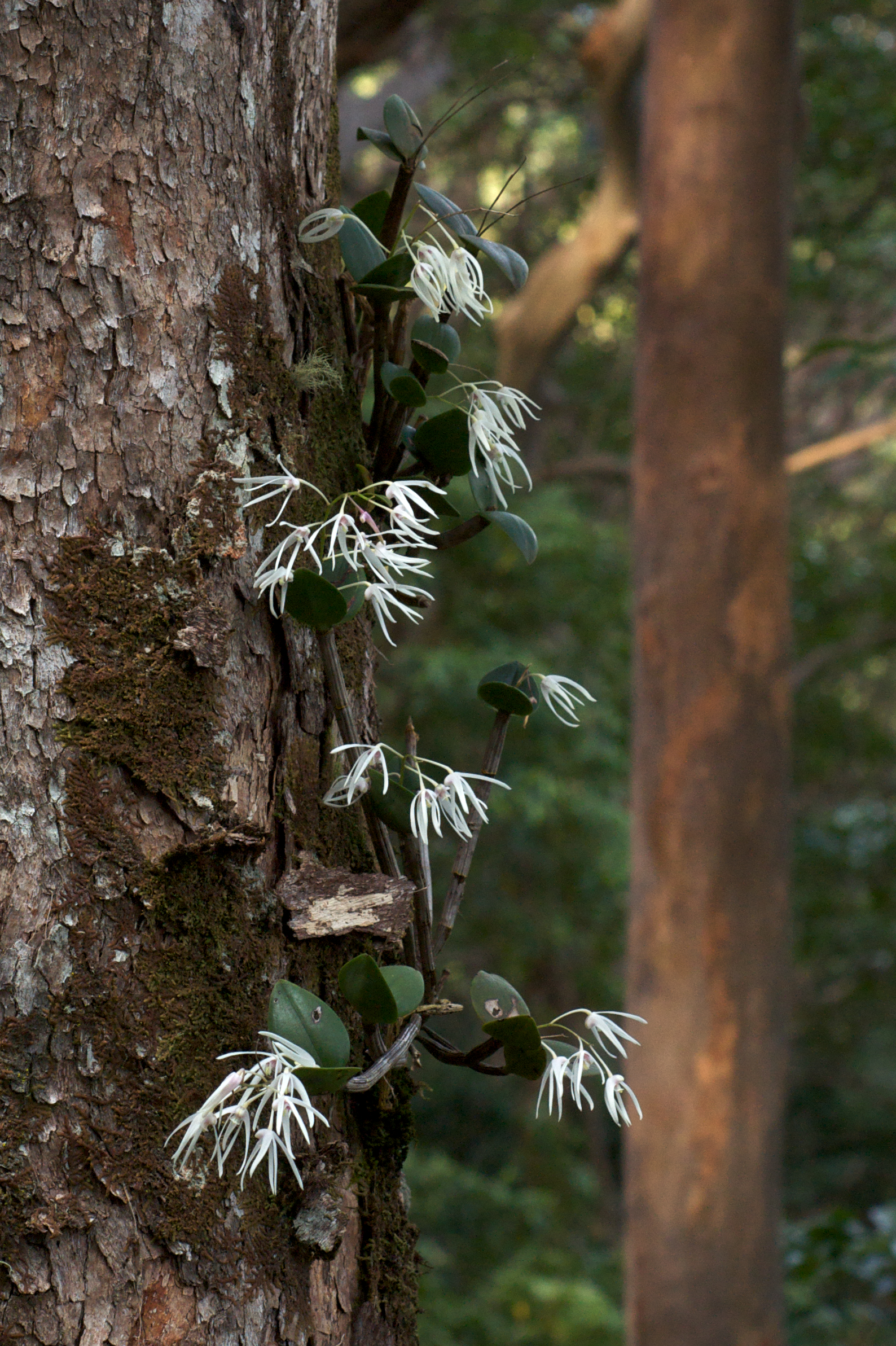
Dendrobium

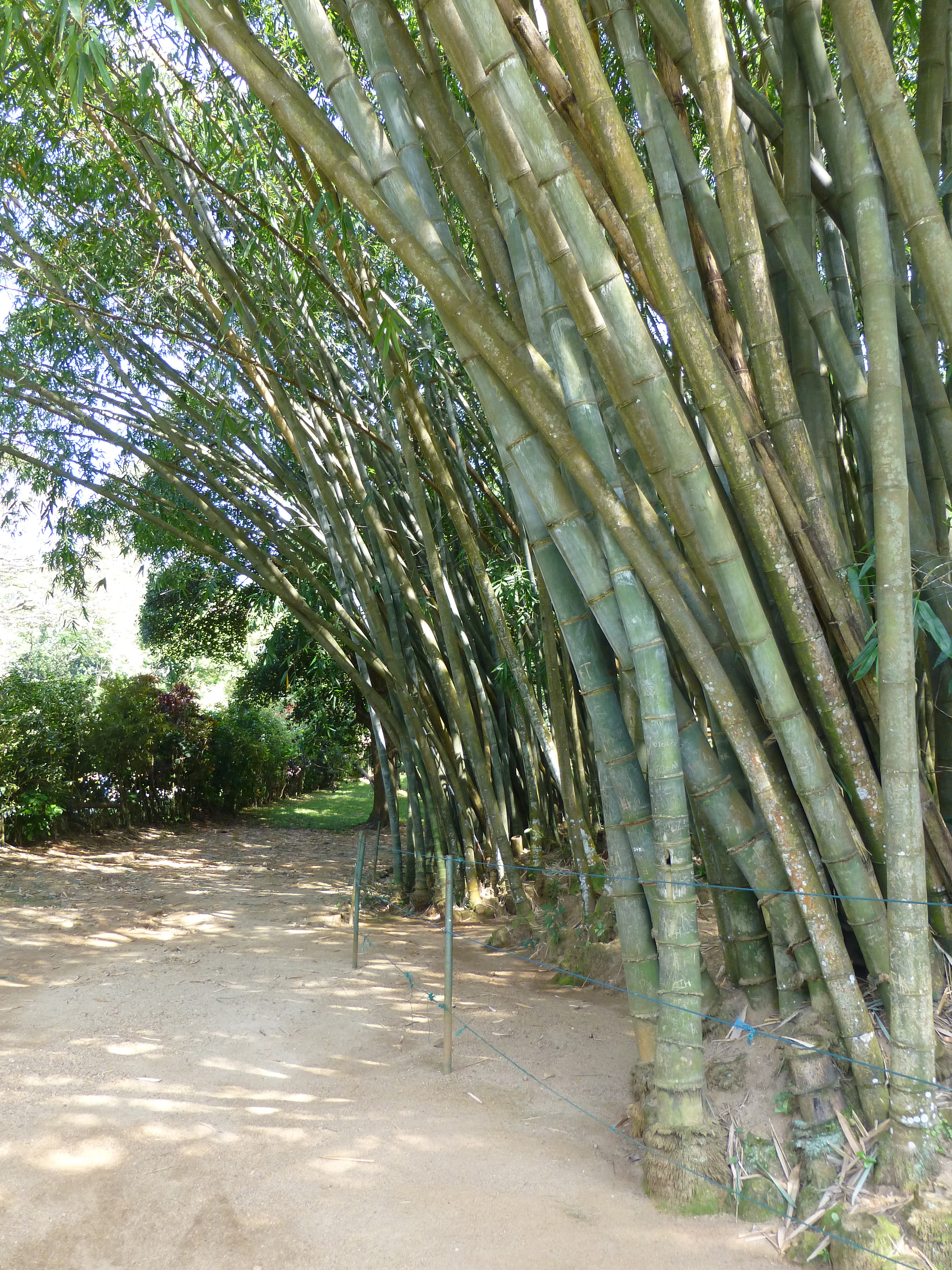
Dendrocalamus

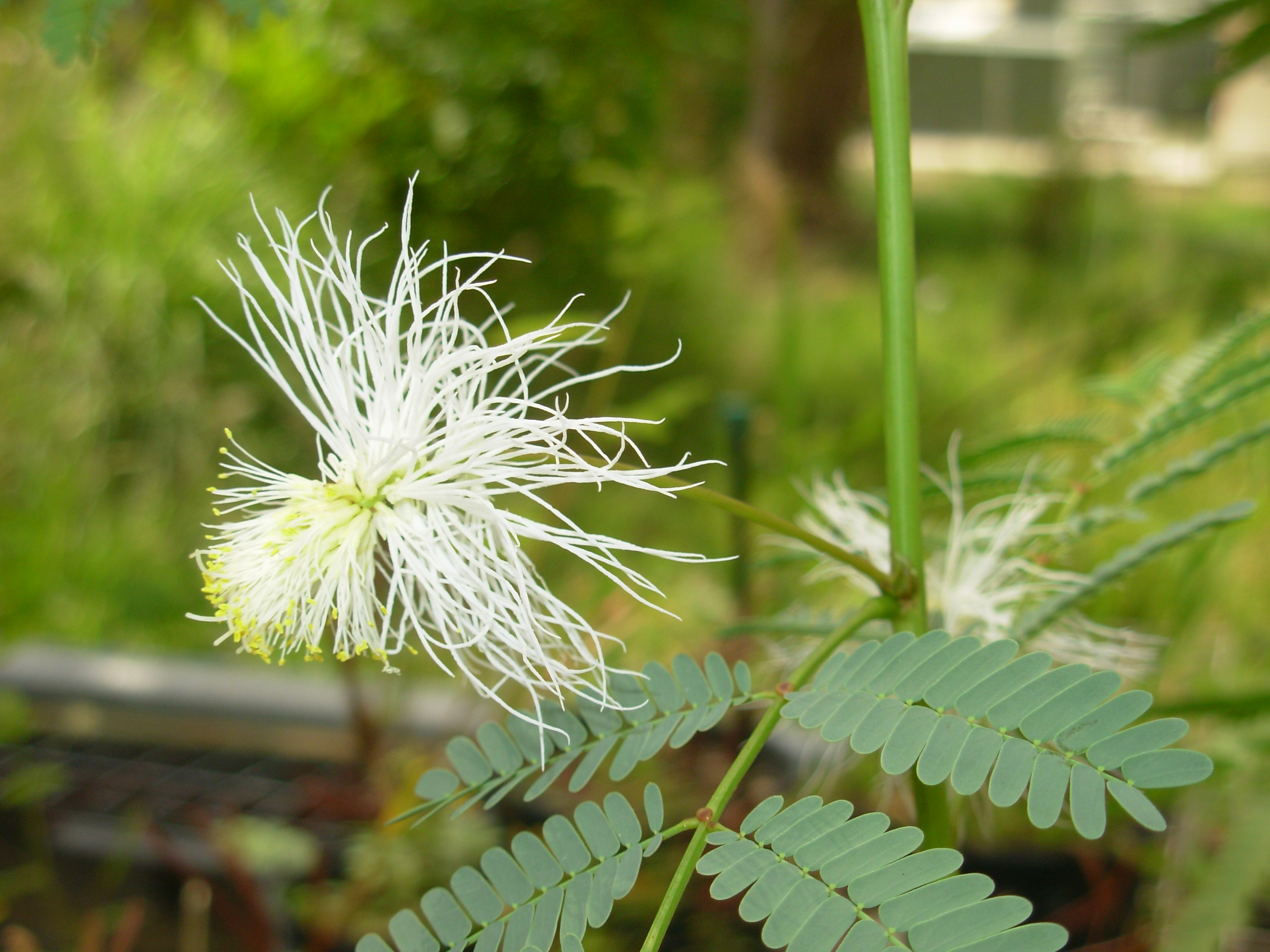
Desmanthus

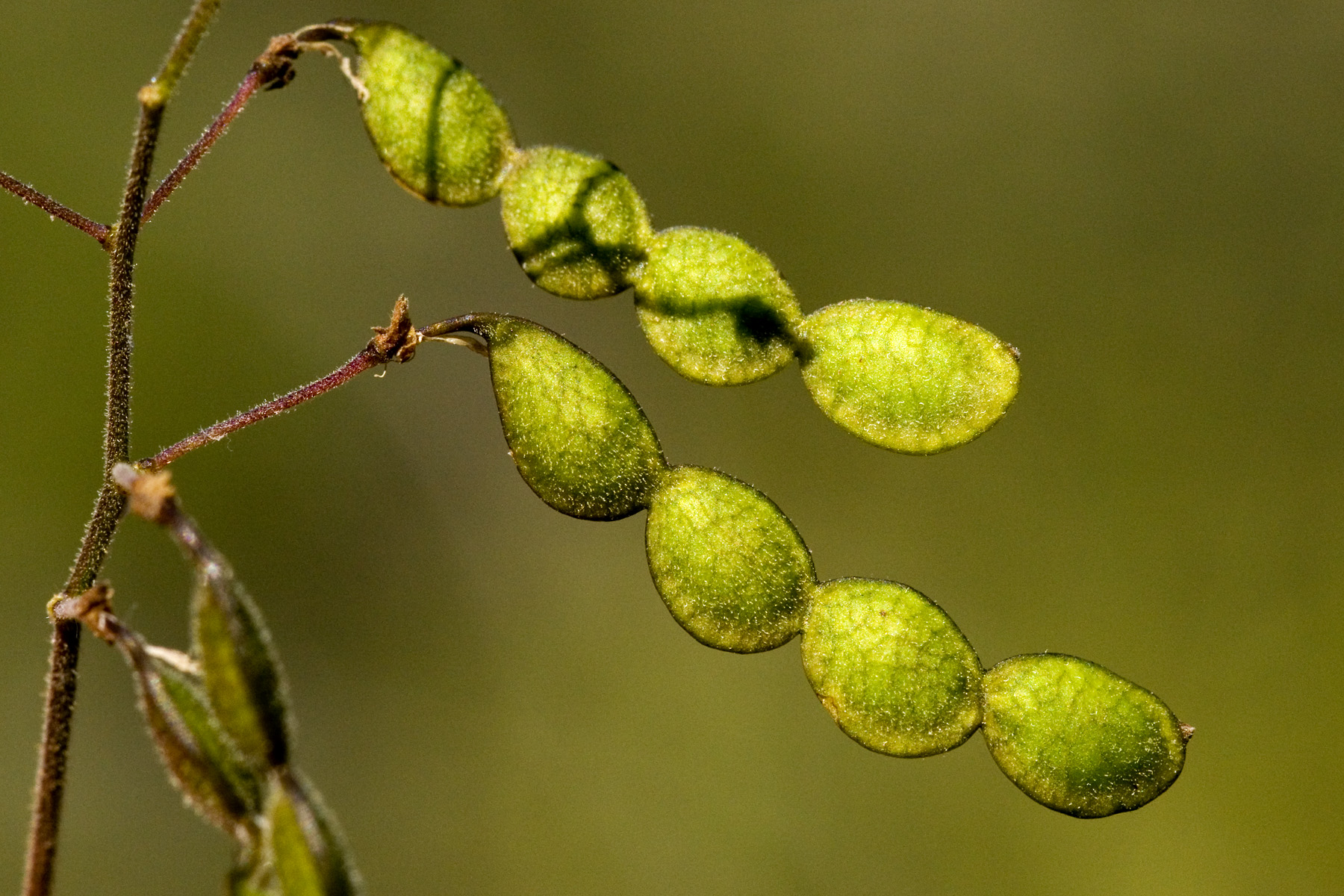
Desmodium

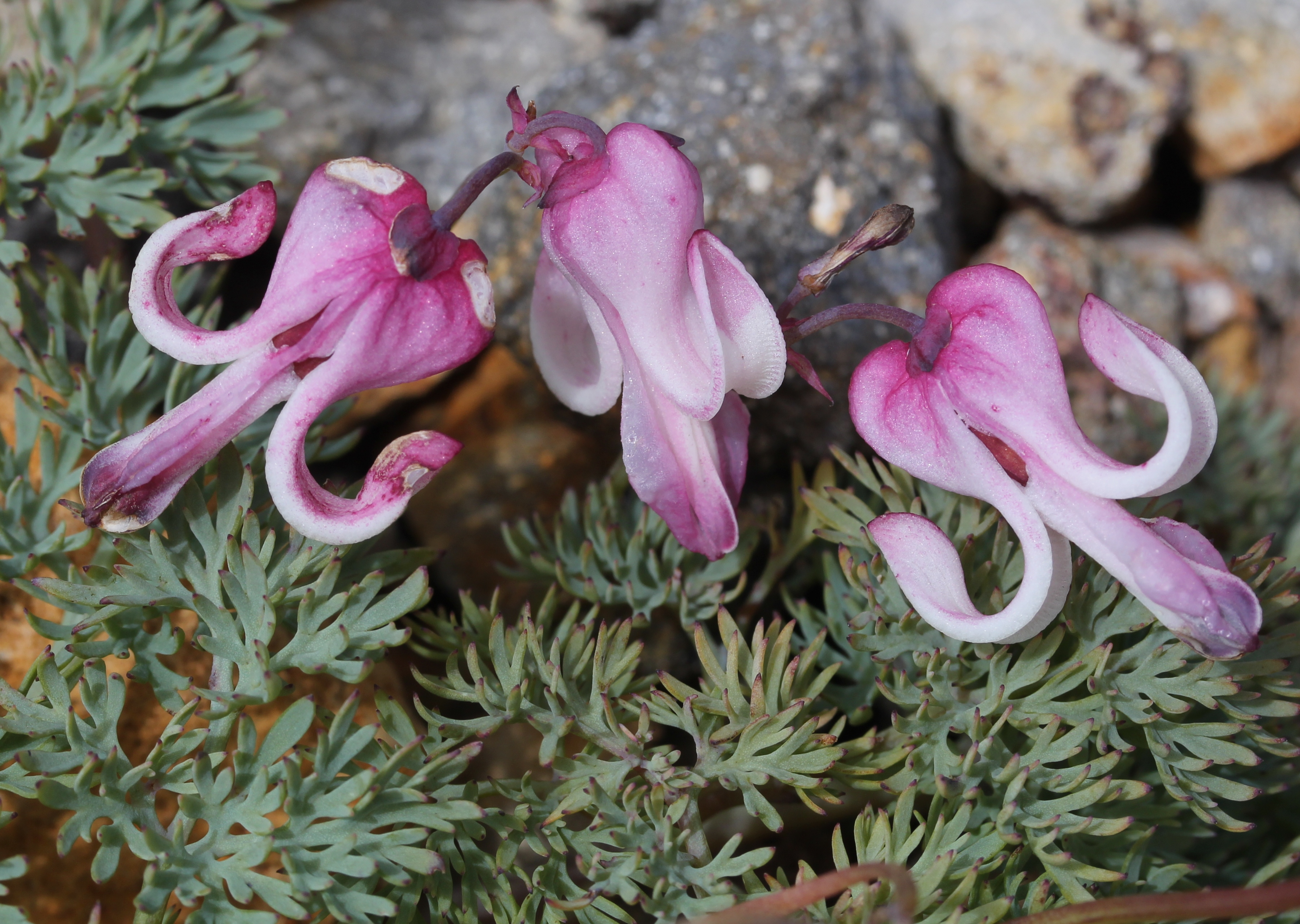
Dicentra

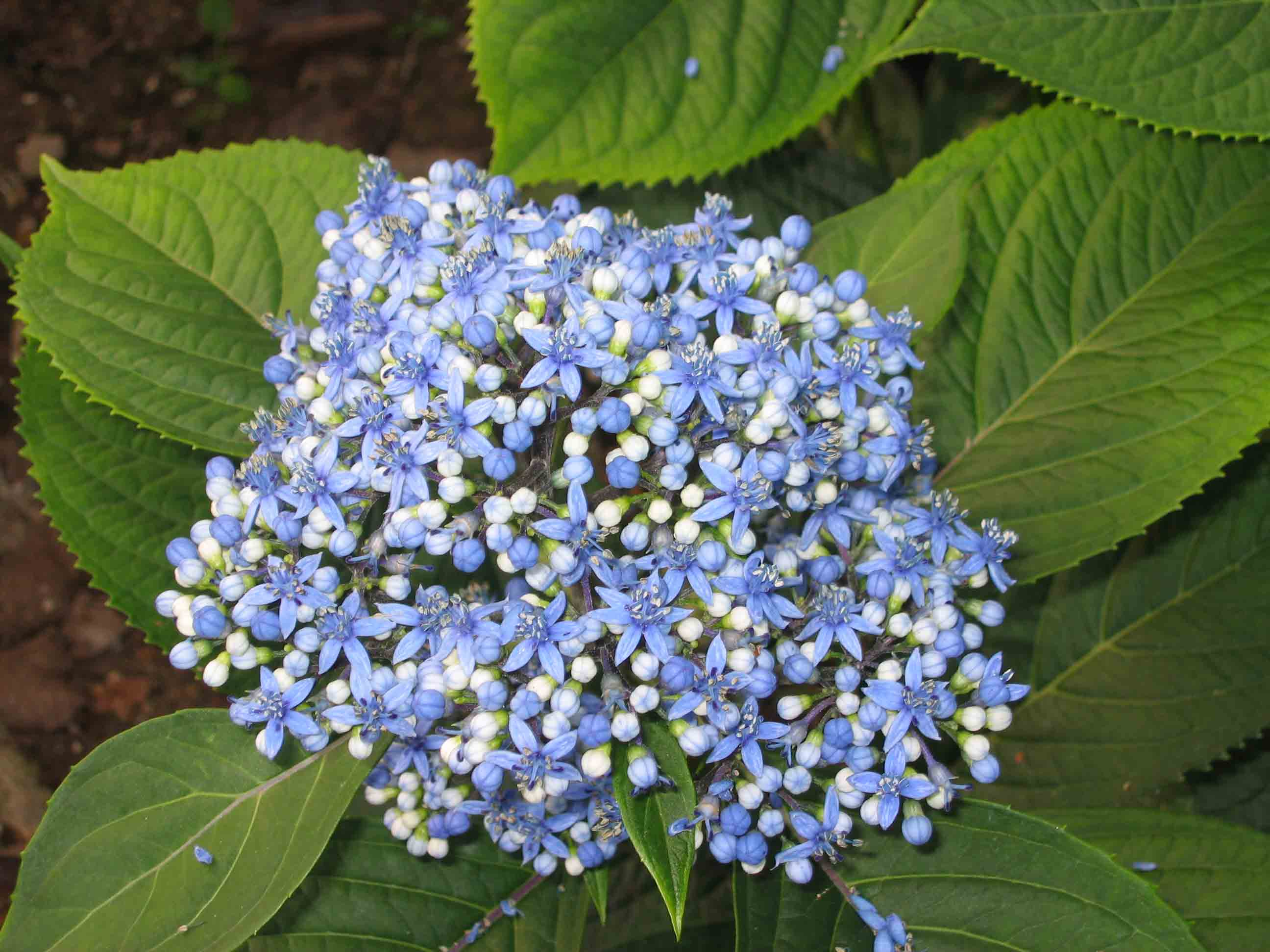
Dichroa

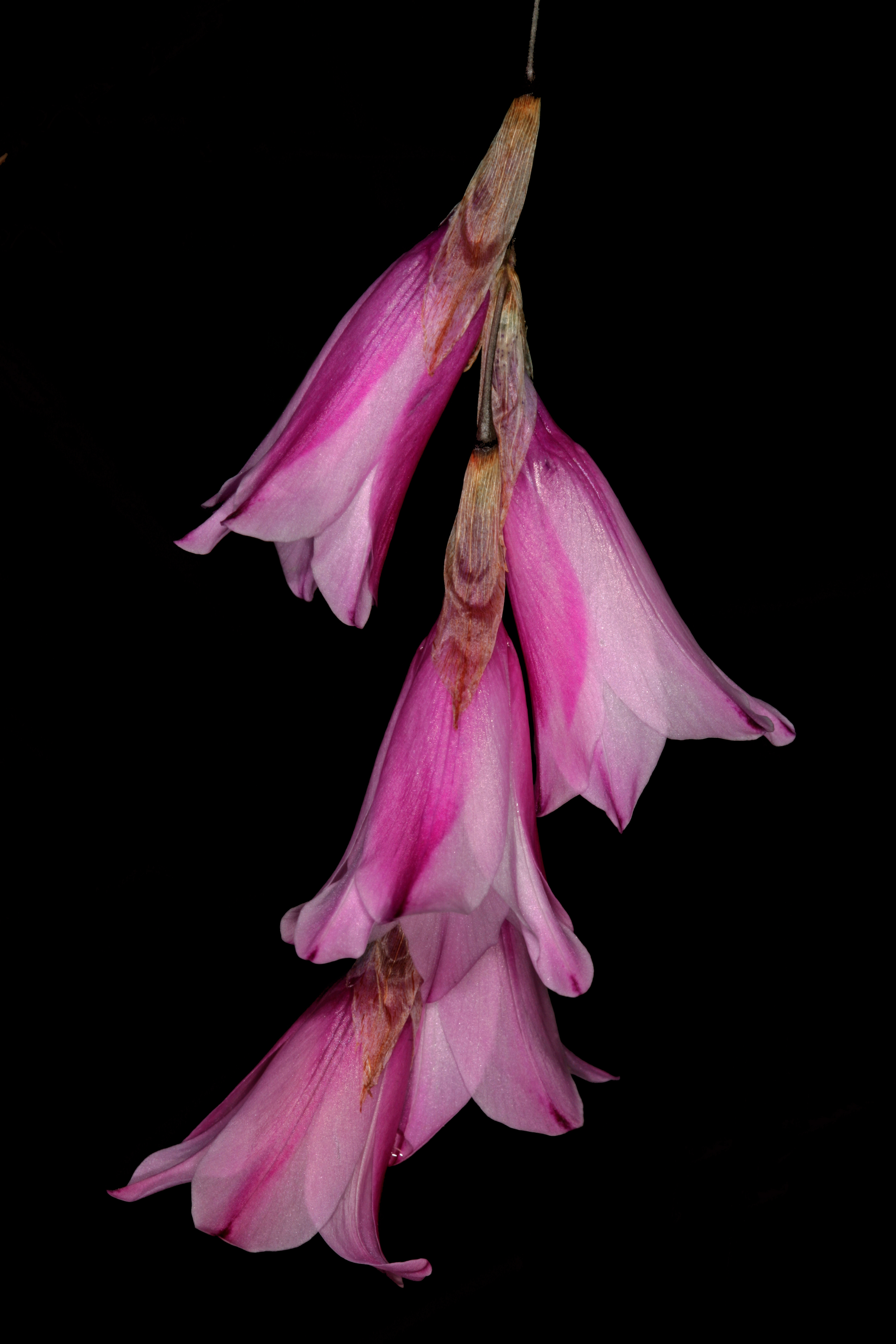
Dierama

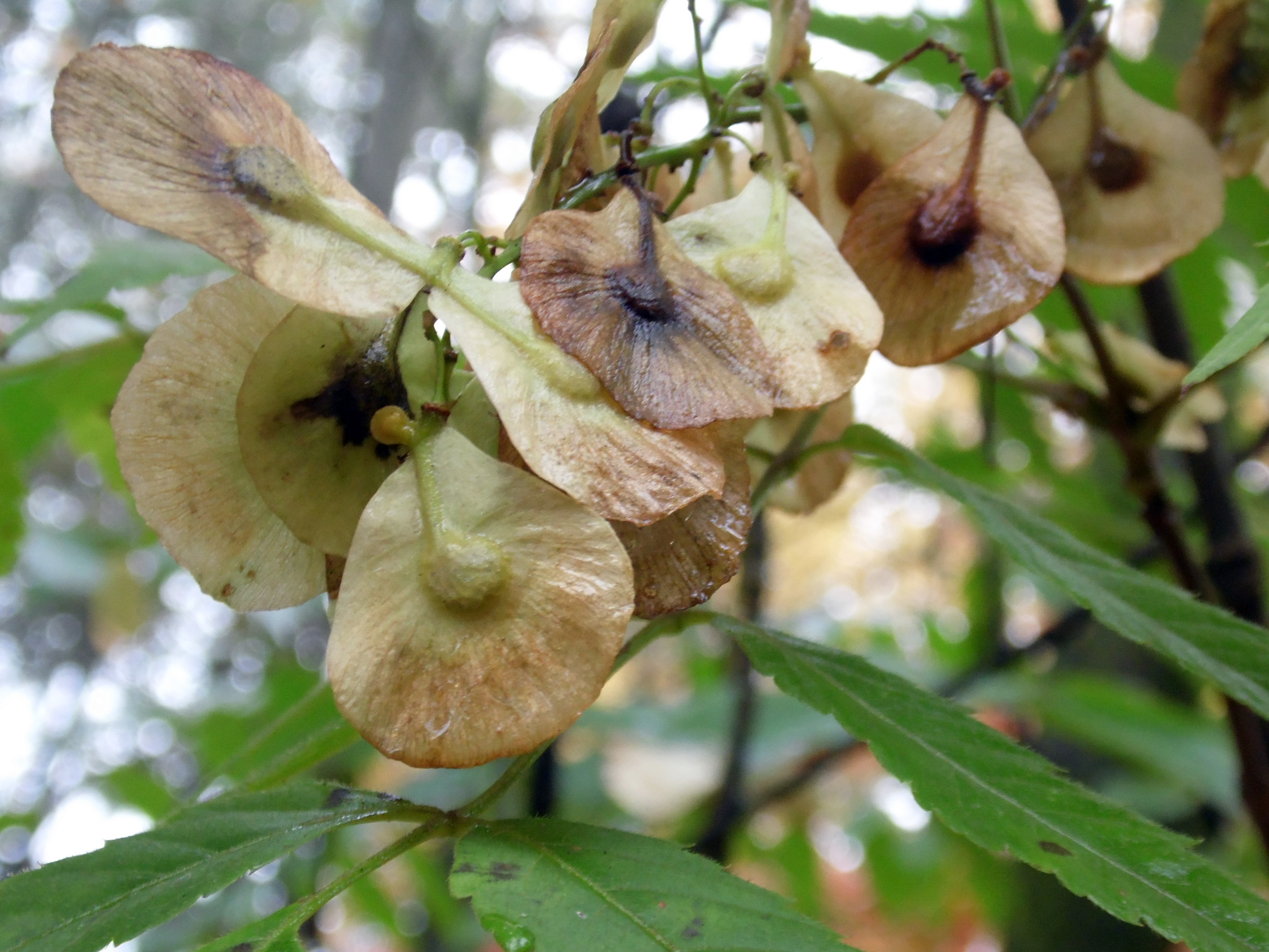
Dipteronia

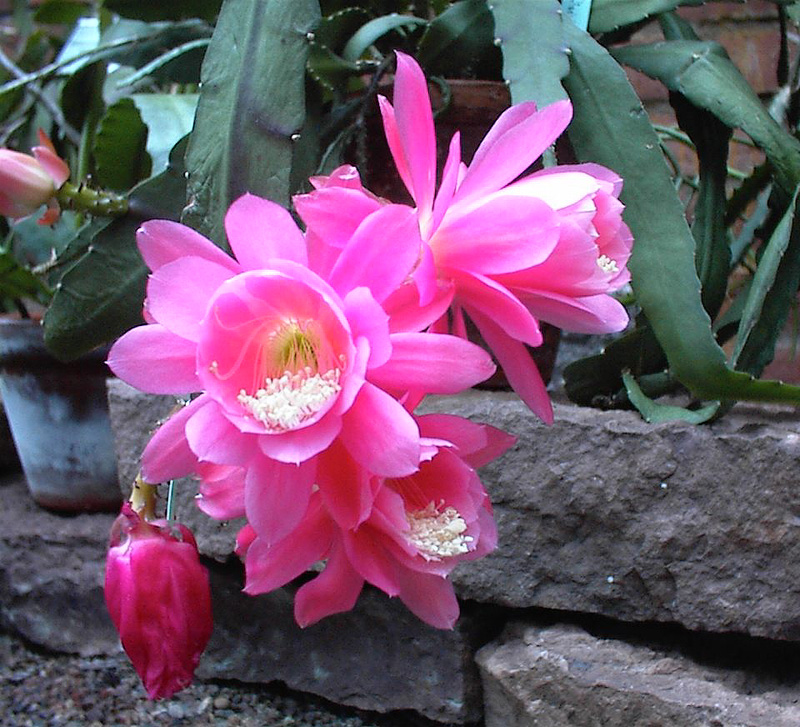
Disocactus

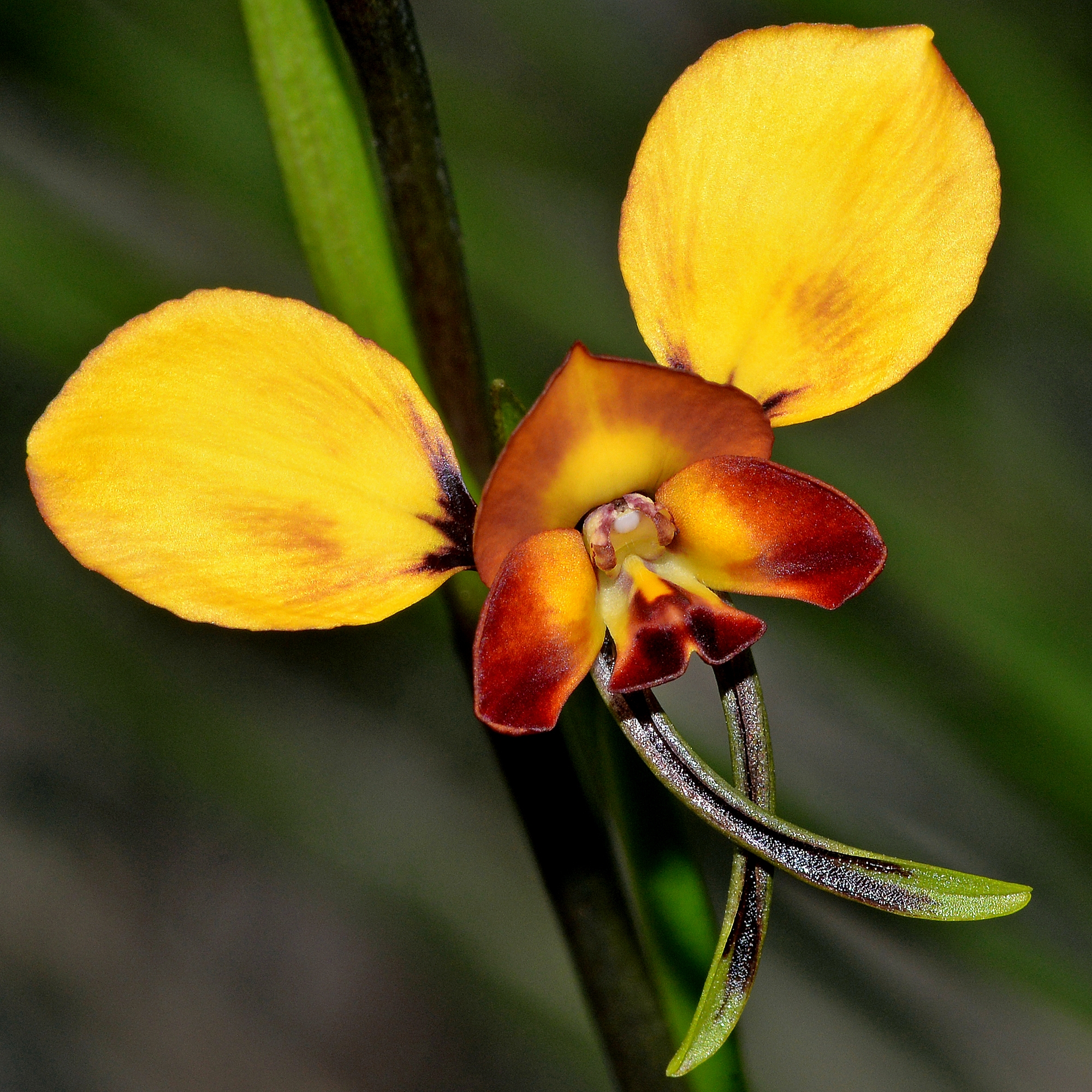
Diuris

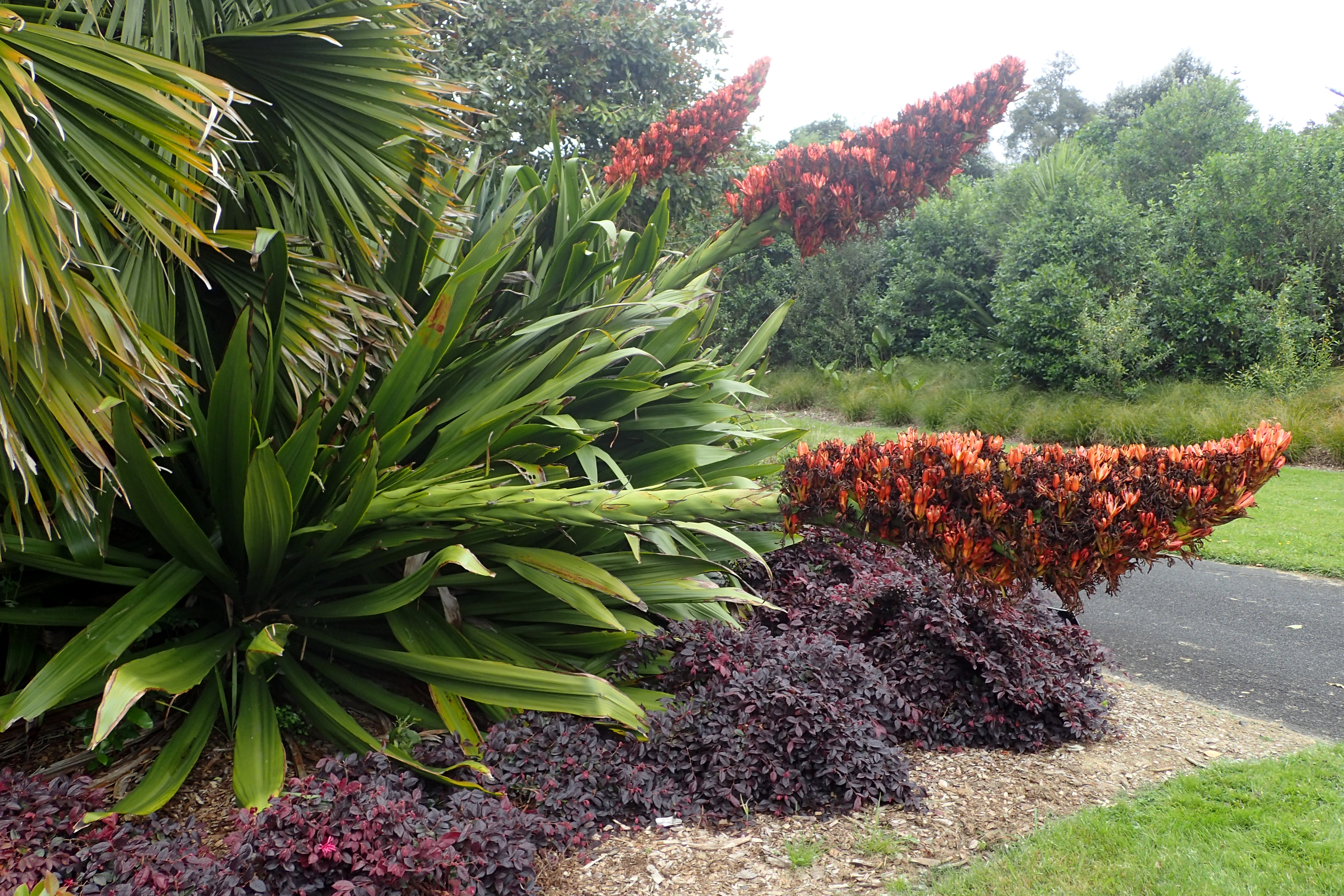
Doryanthes

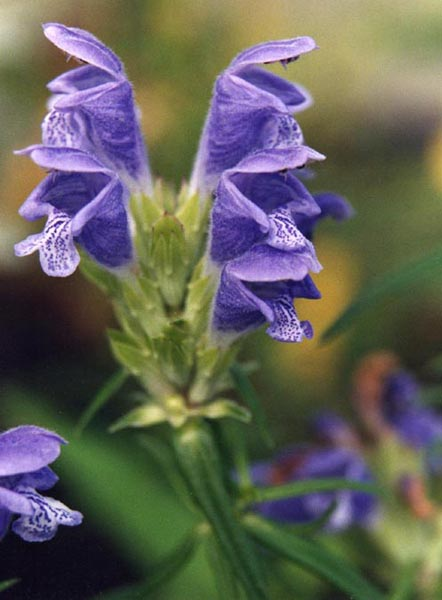
Dracocephalum

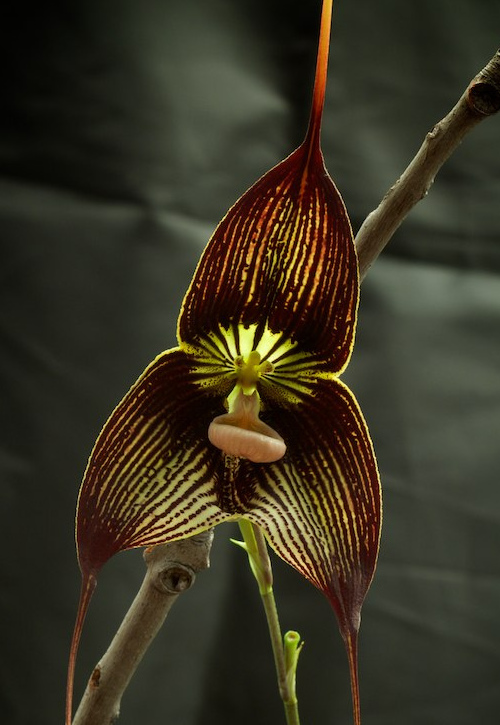
Dracula

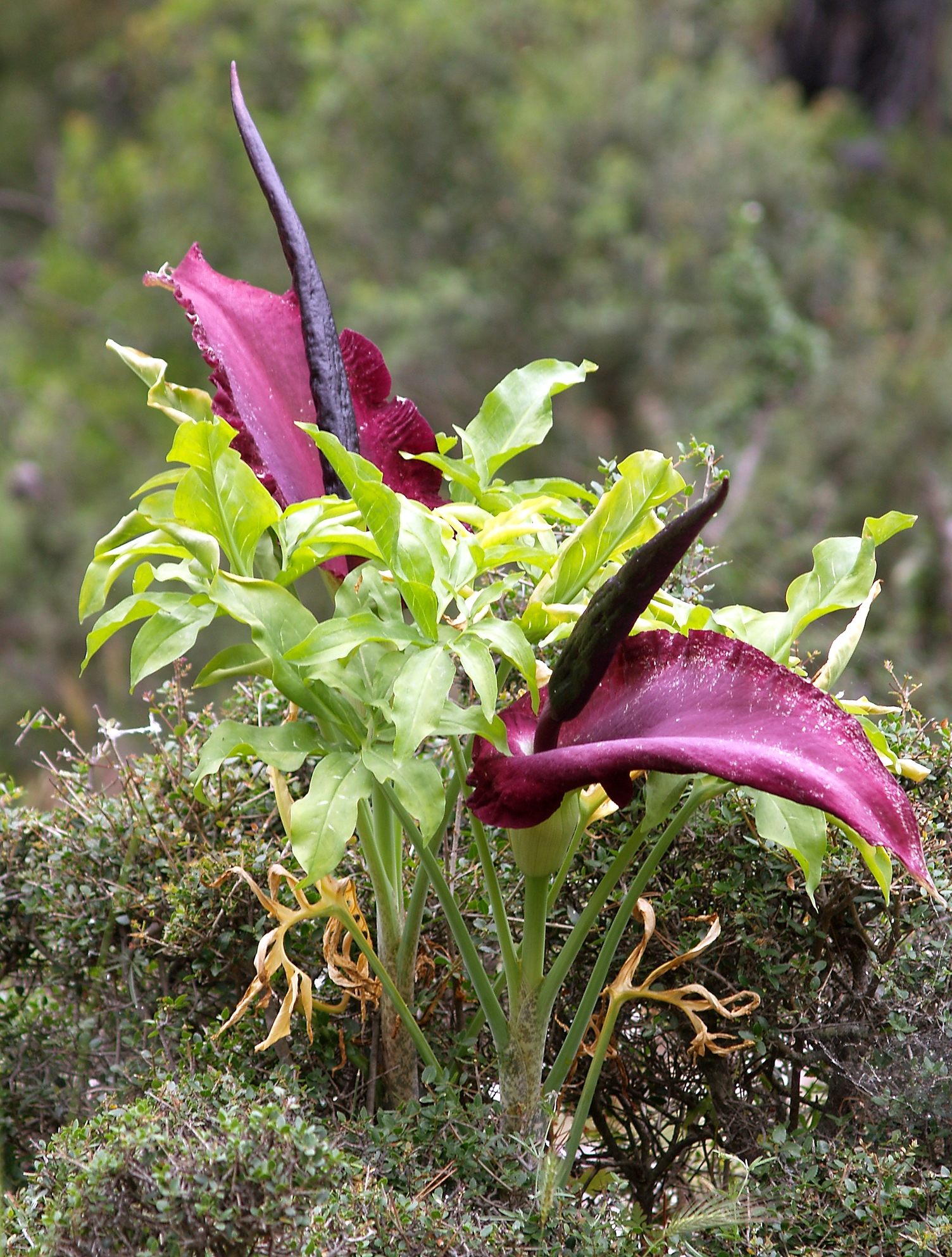
Dracunculus

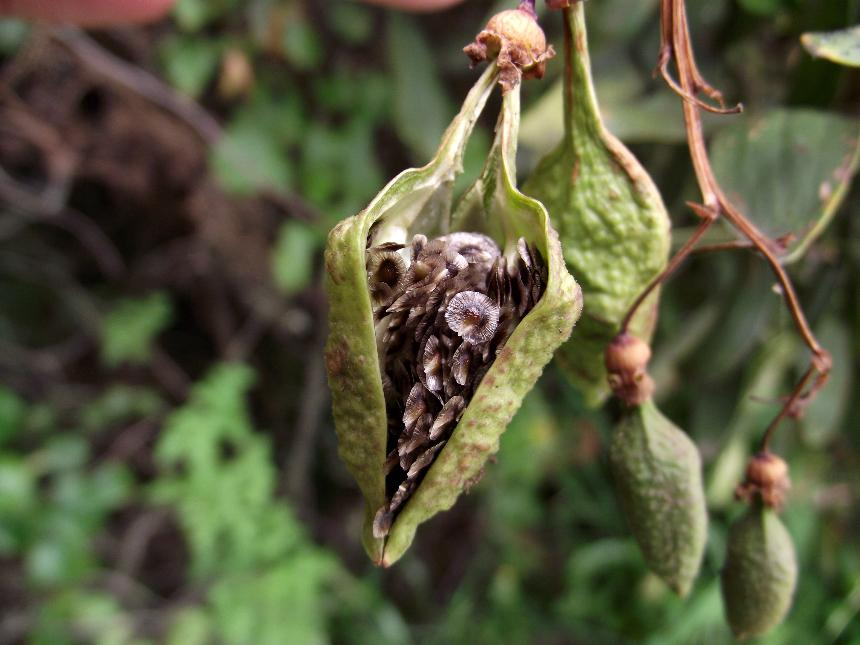
Eccremocarpus

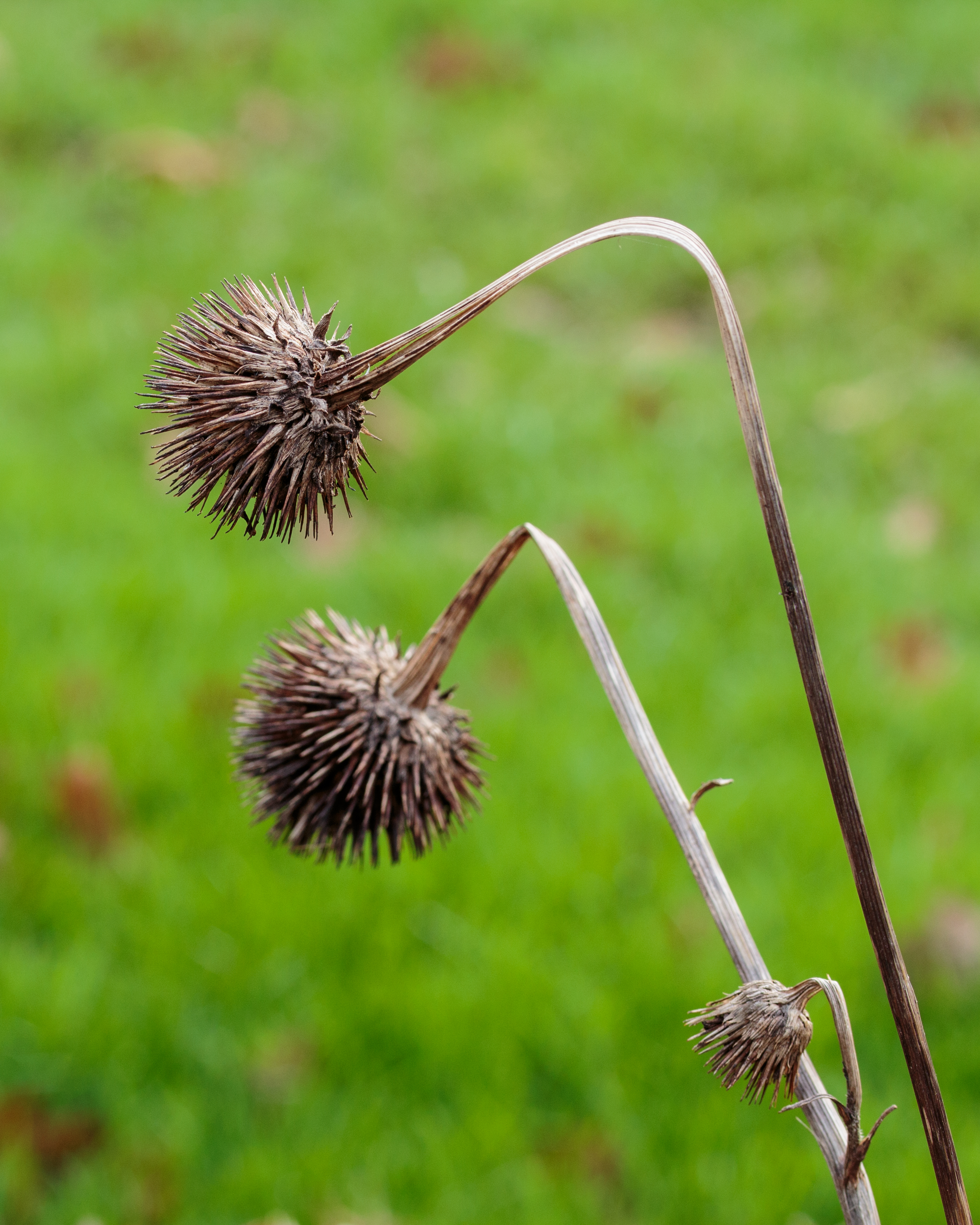
Echinacea

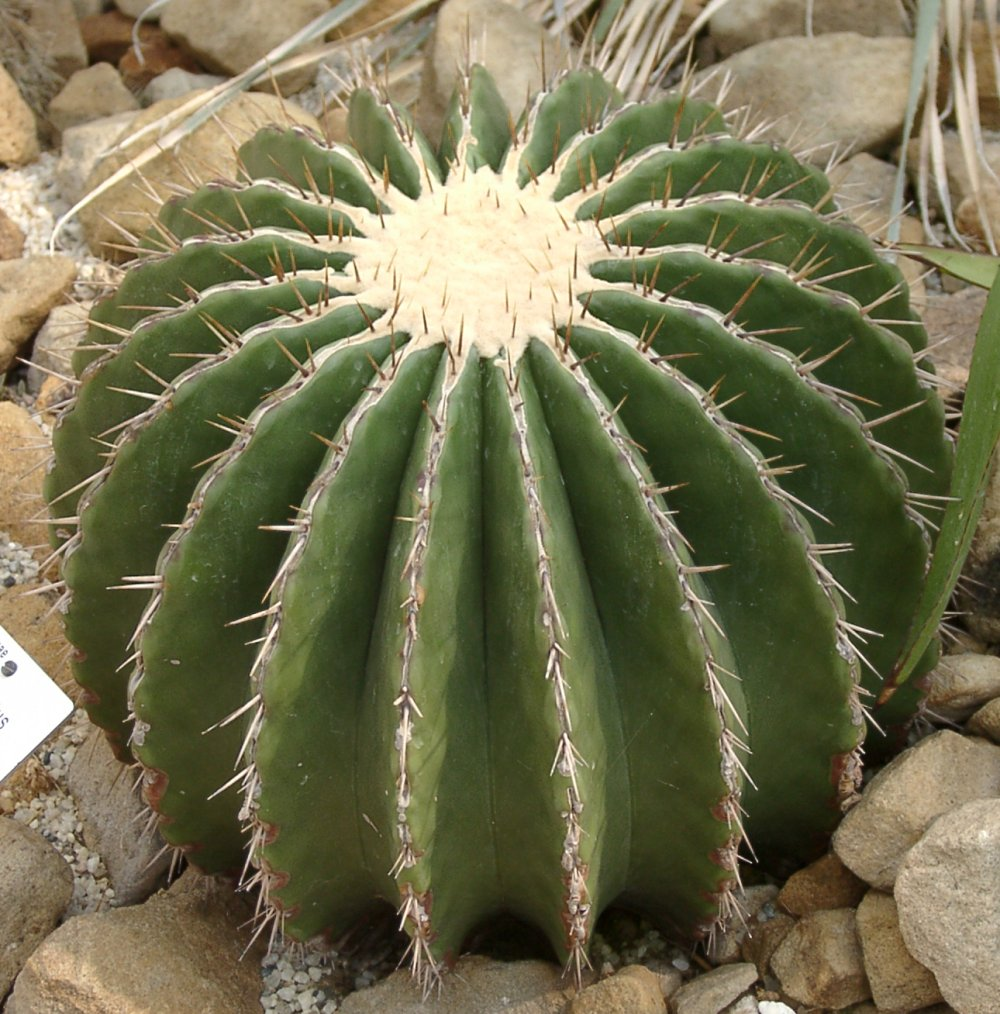
Echinocactus

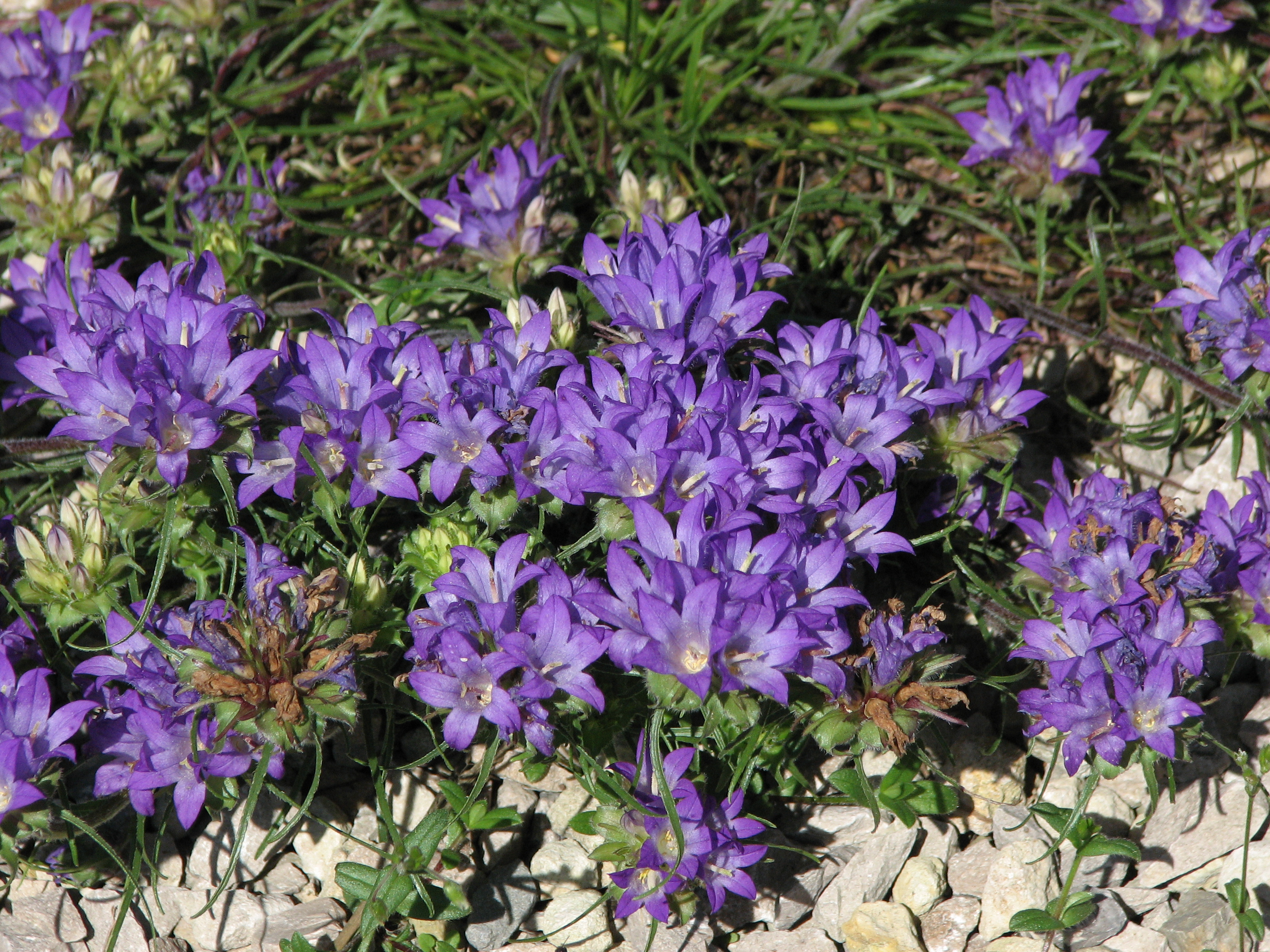
Edraianthus

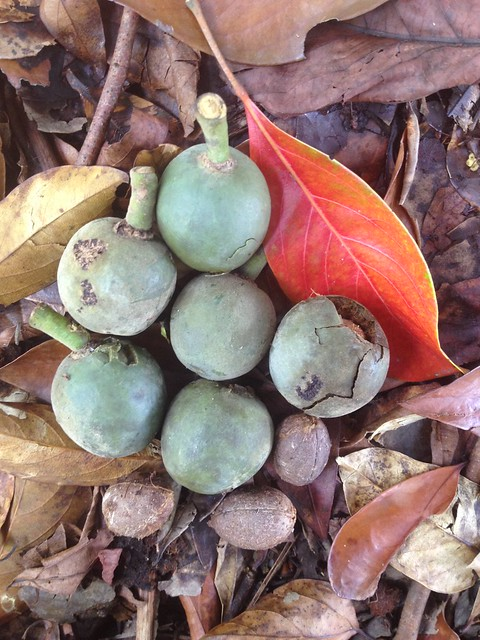
Elaeocarpus

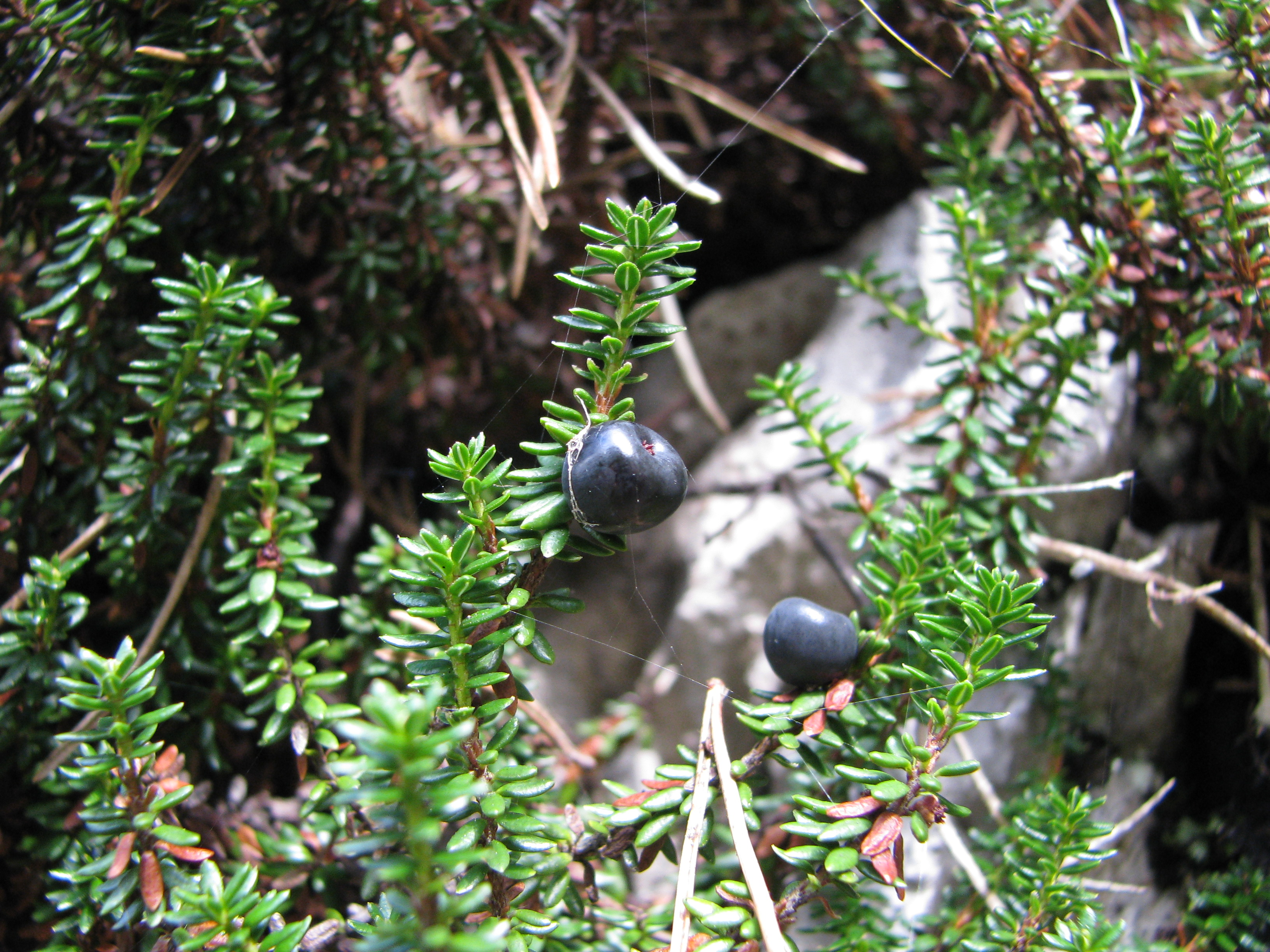
Empetrum

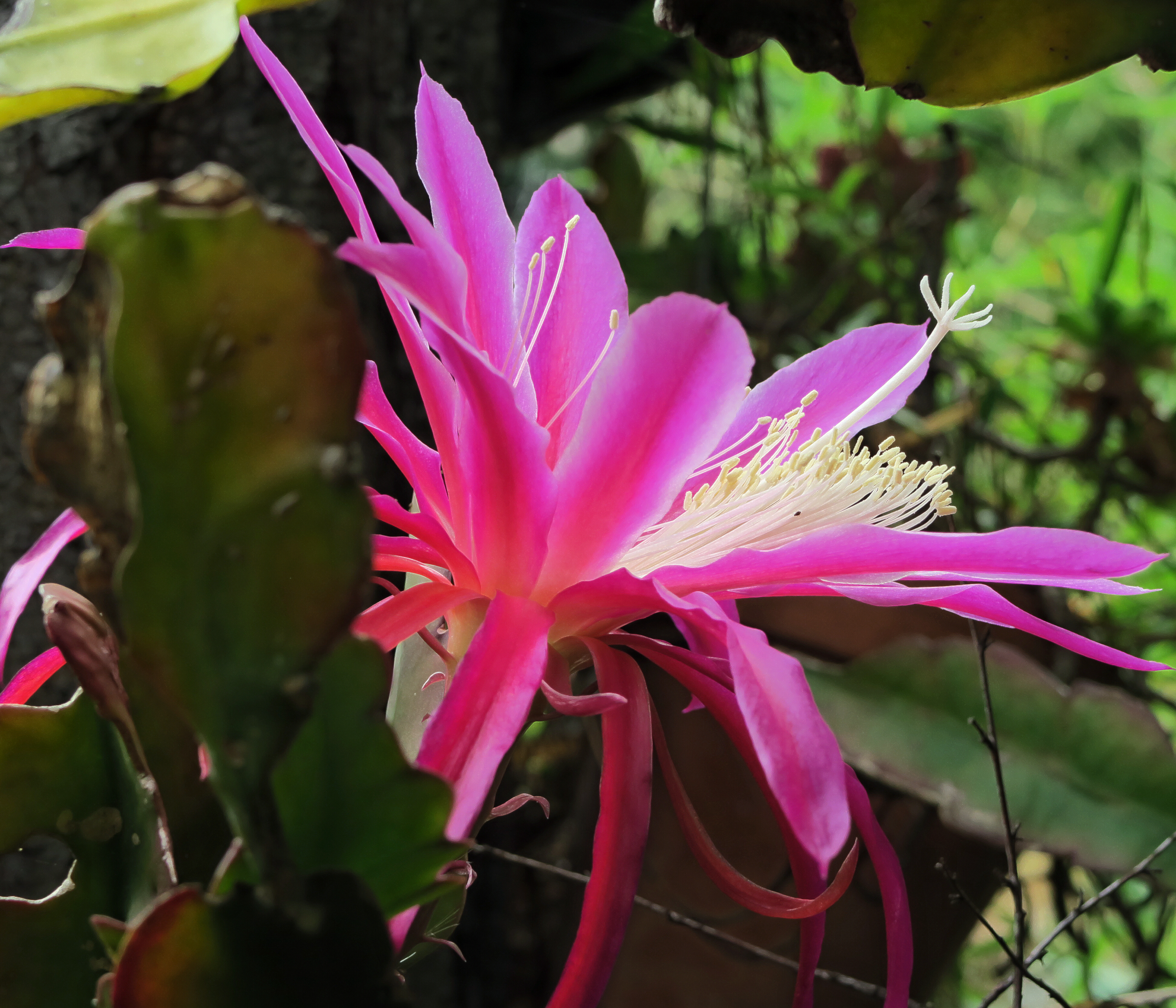
Epiphyllum

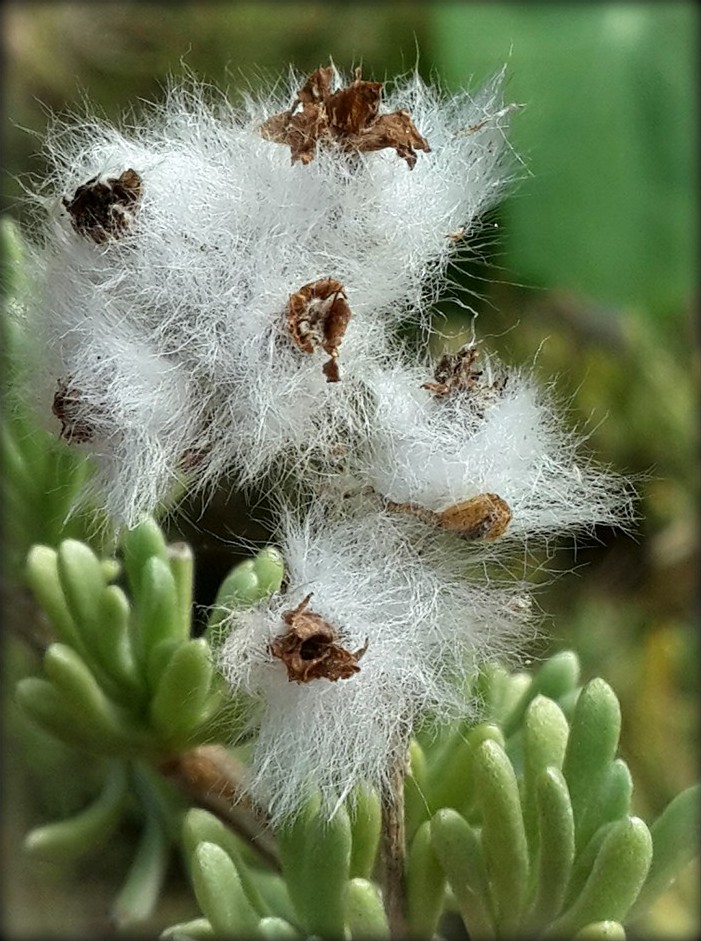
Eriocephalus

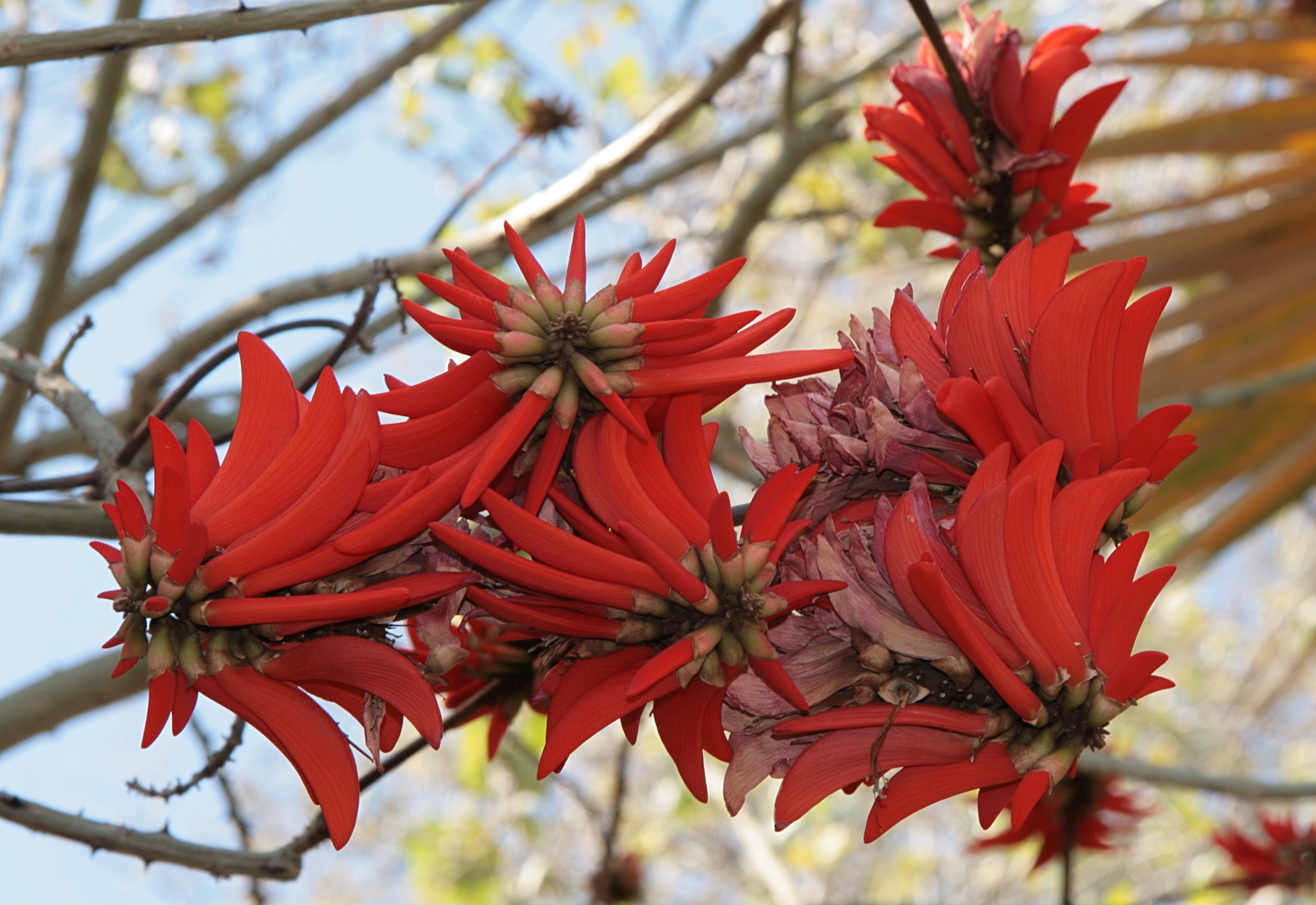
Erythrina

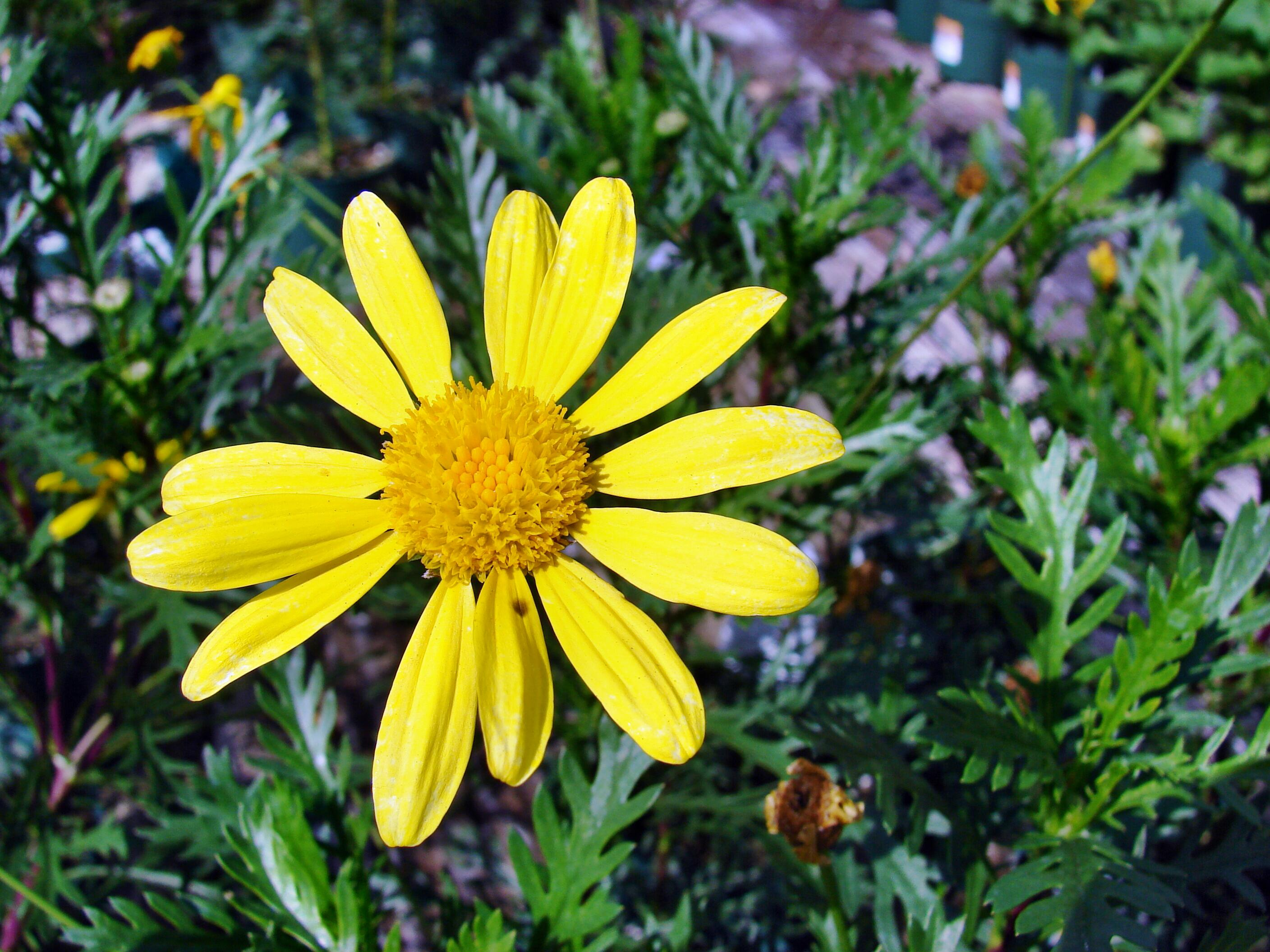
Euryops

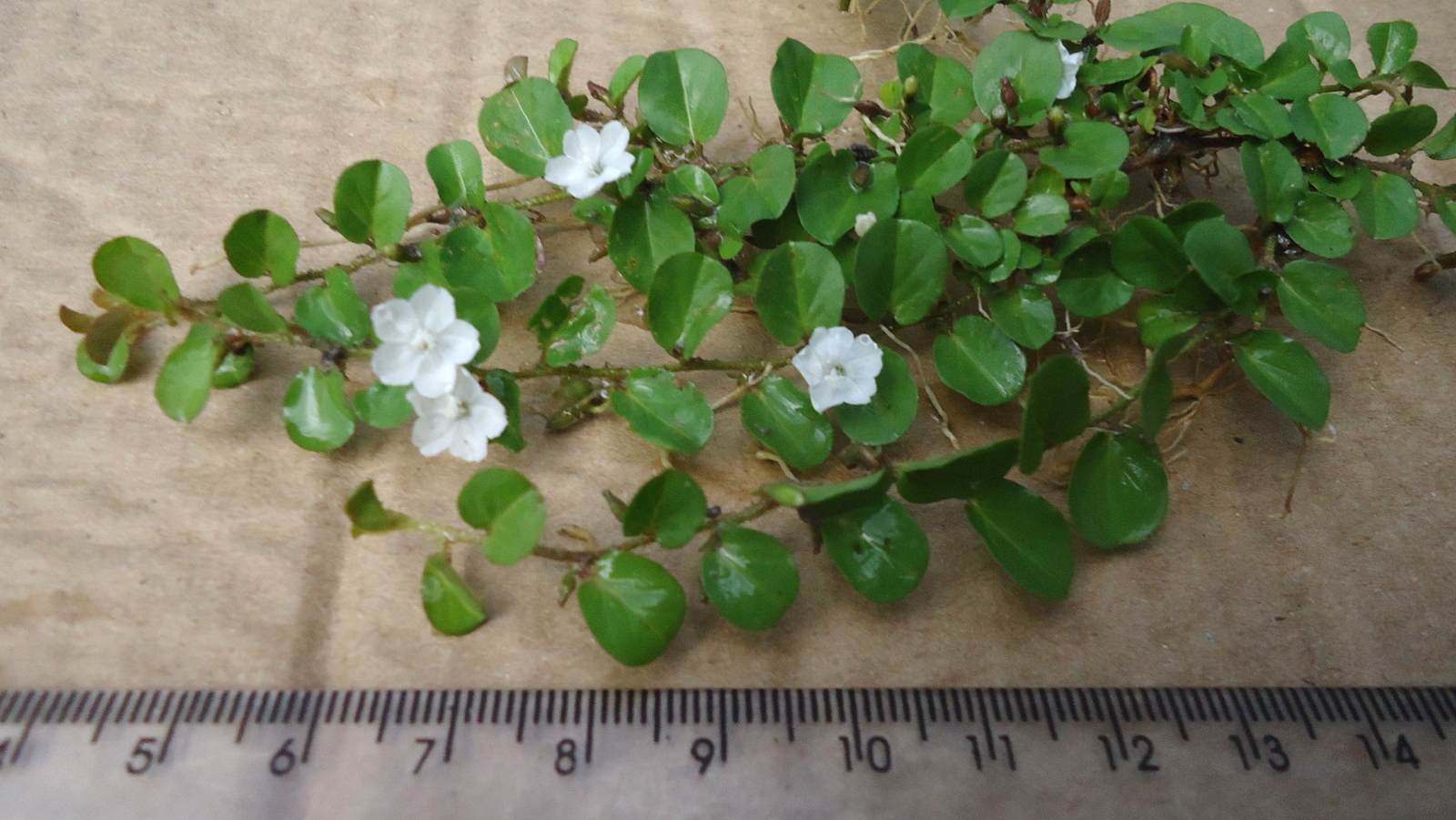
Evolvulus

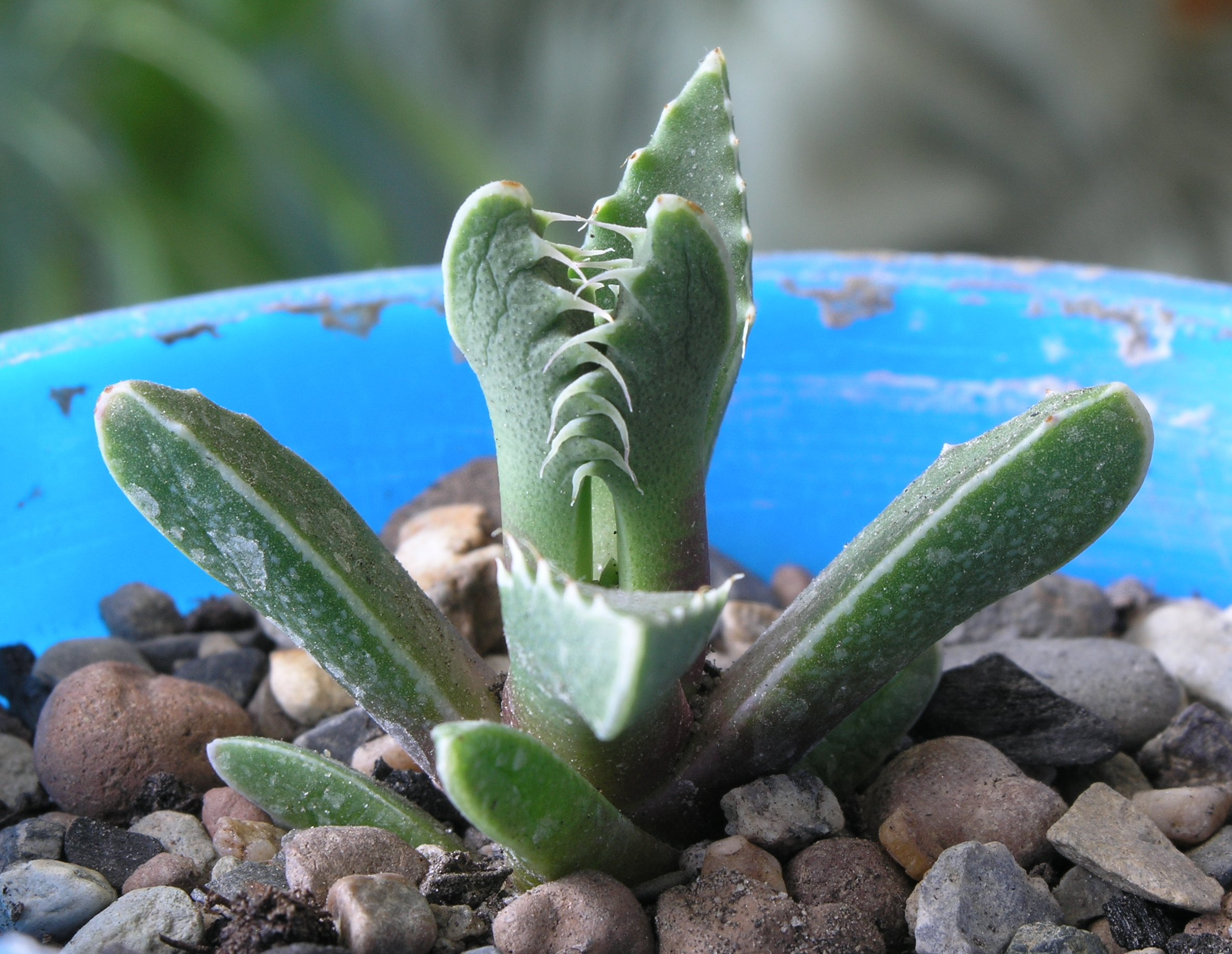
Faucaria

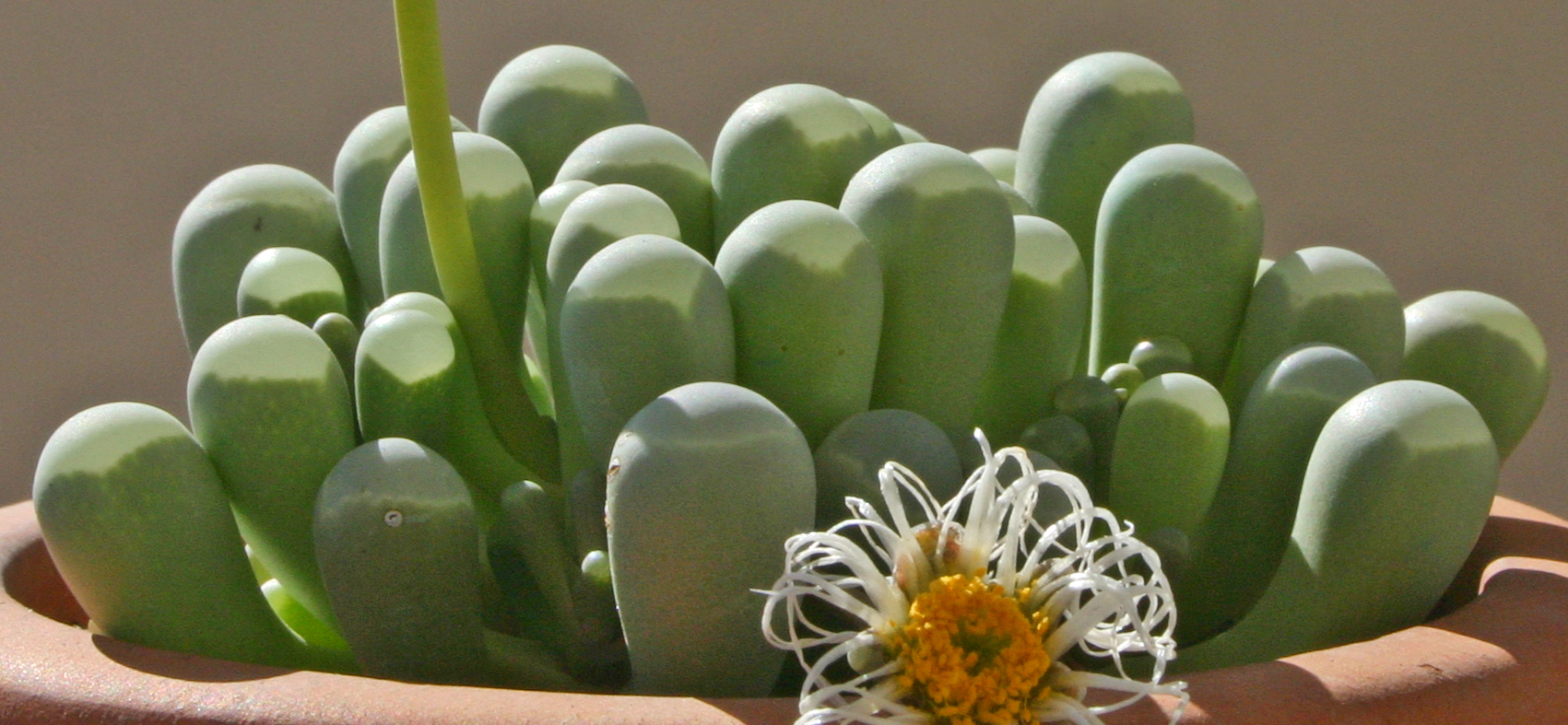
Fenestraria

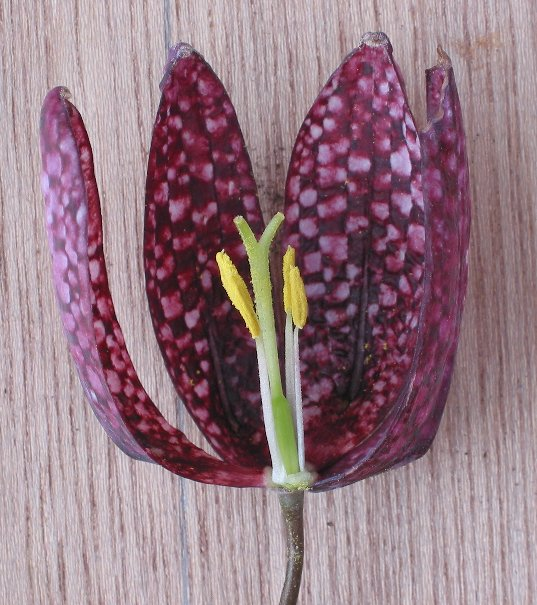
Fritillaria cross-section

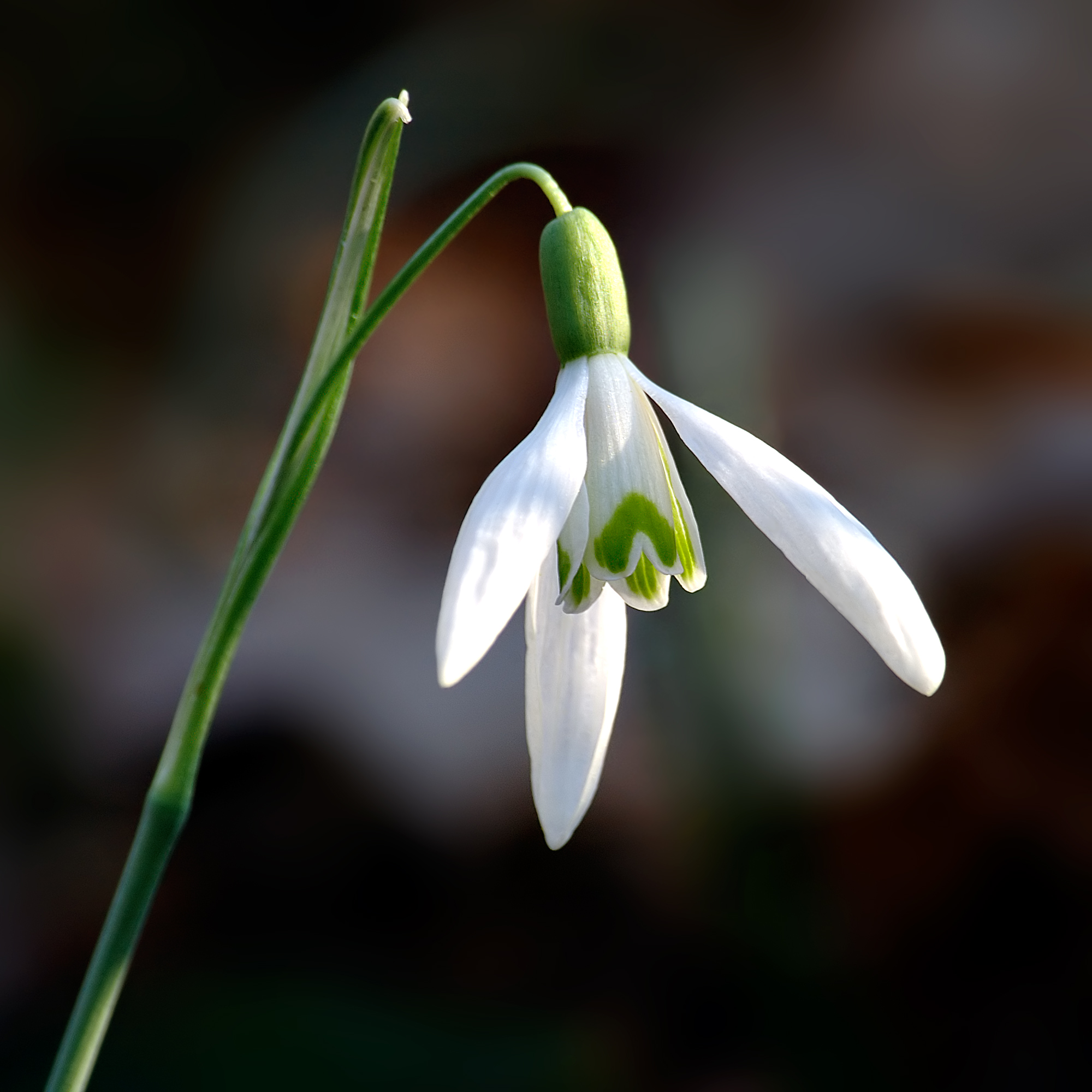
Galanthus

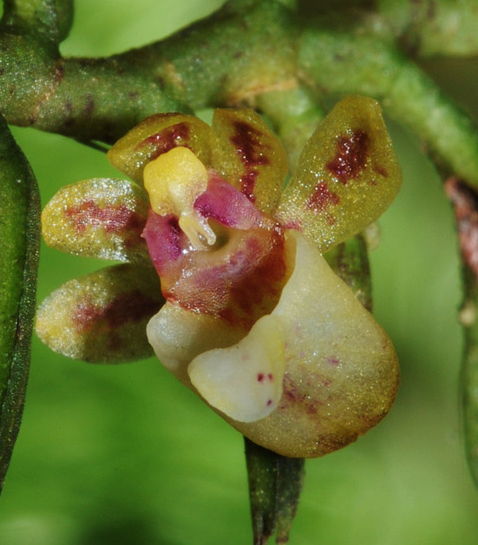
Gastrochilus flower

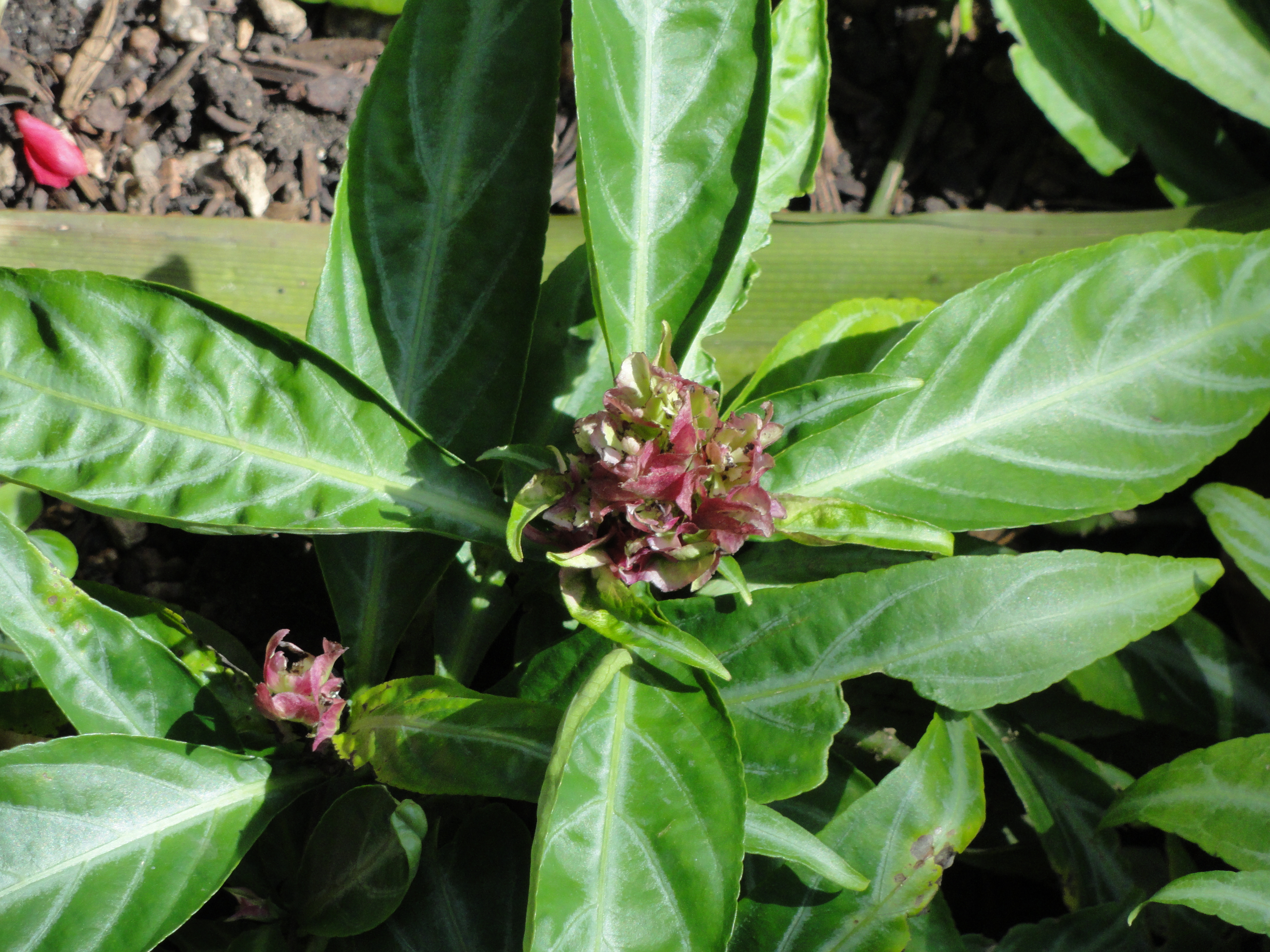
Geogenanthus

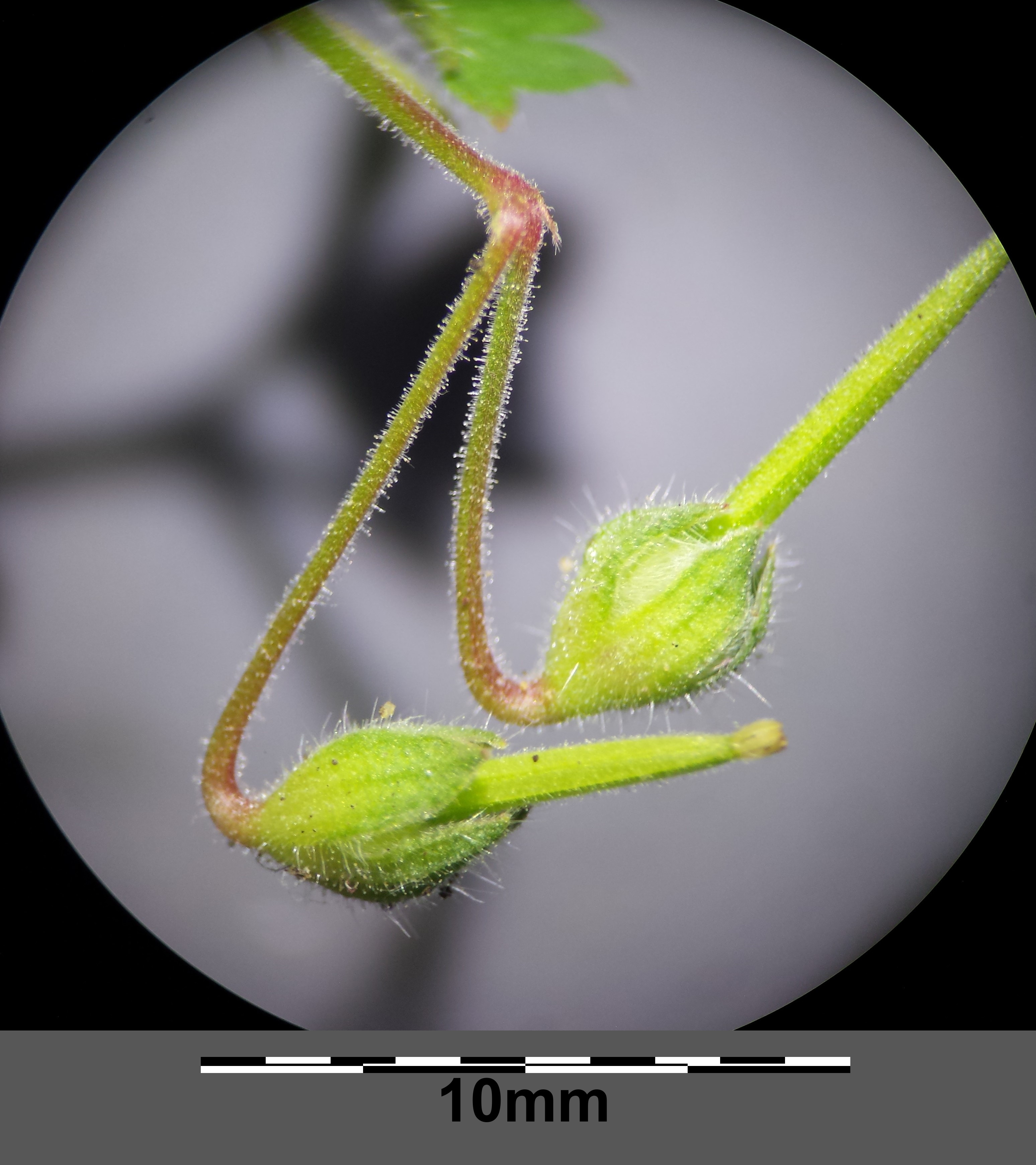
Geranium fruit

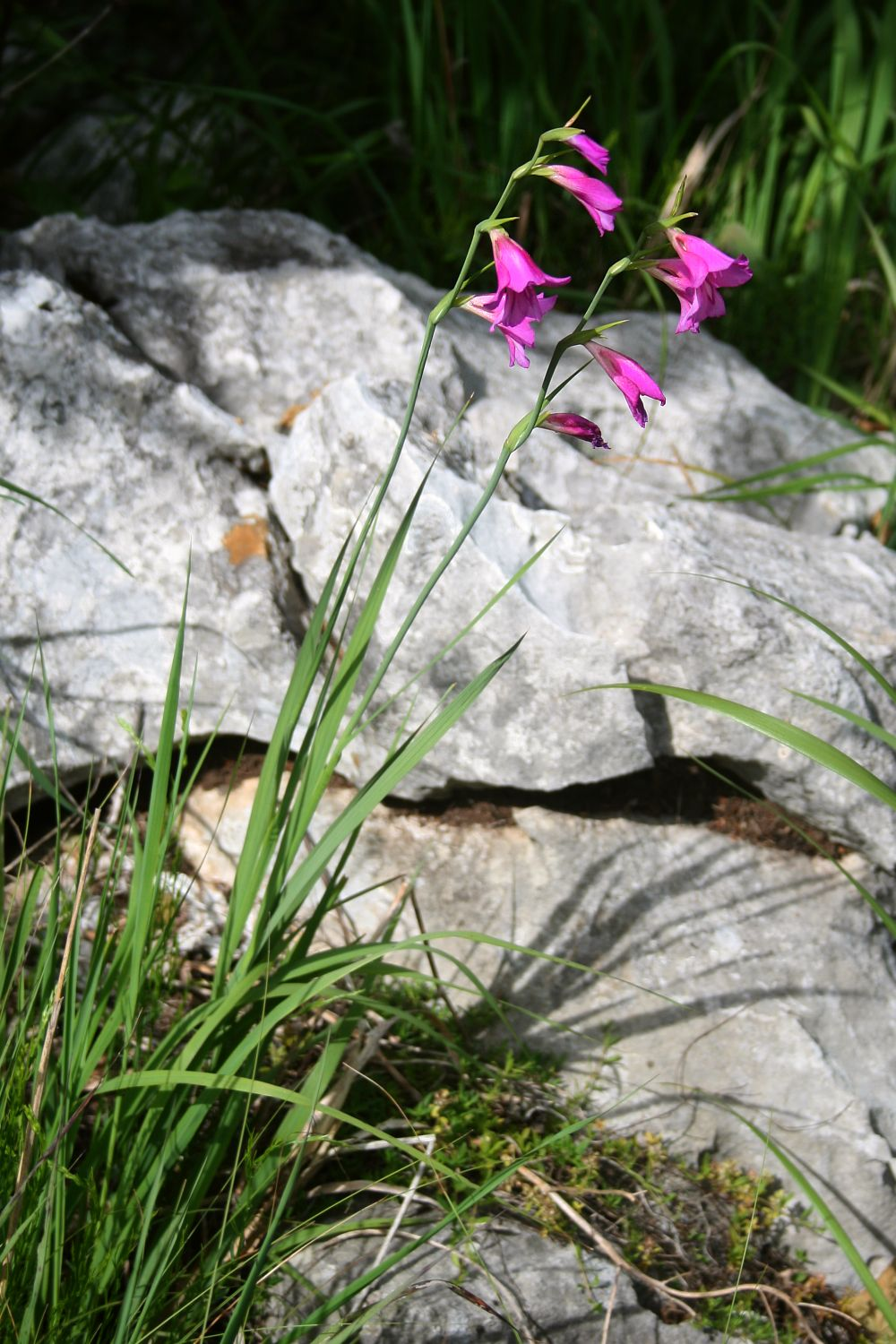
Gladiolus

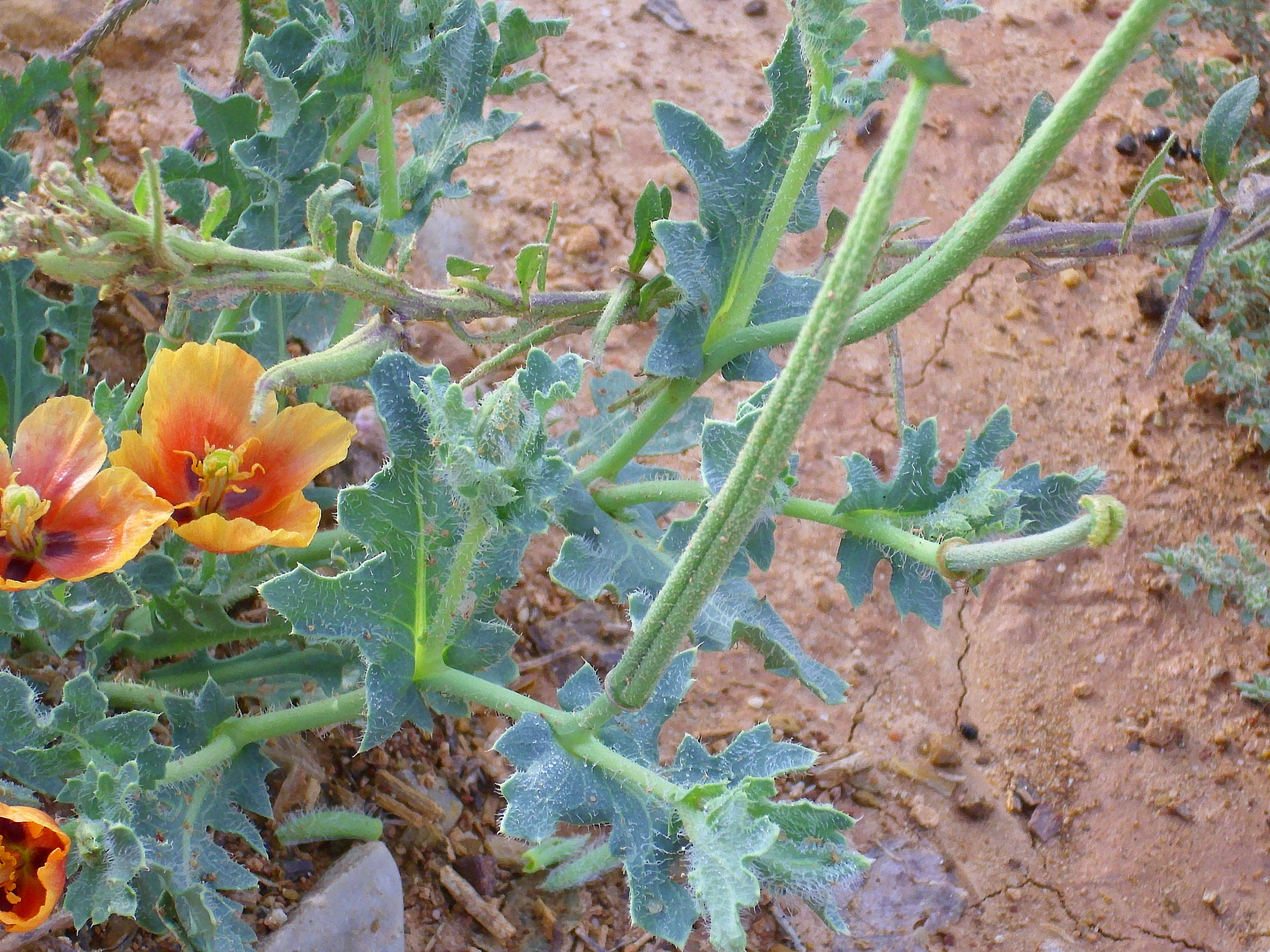
Glaucium

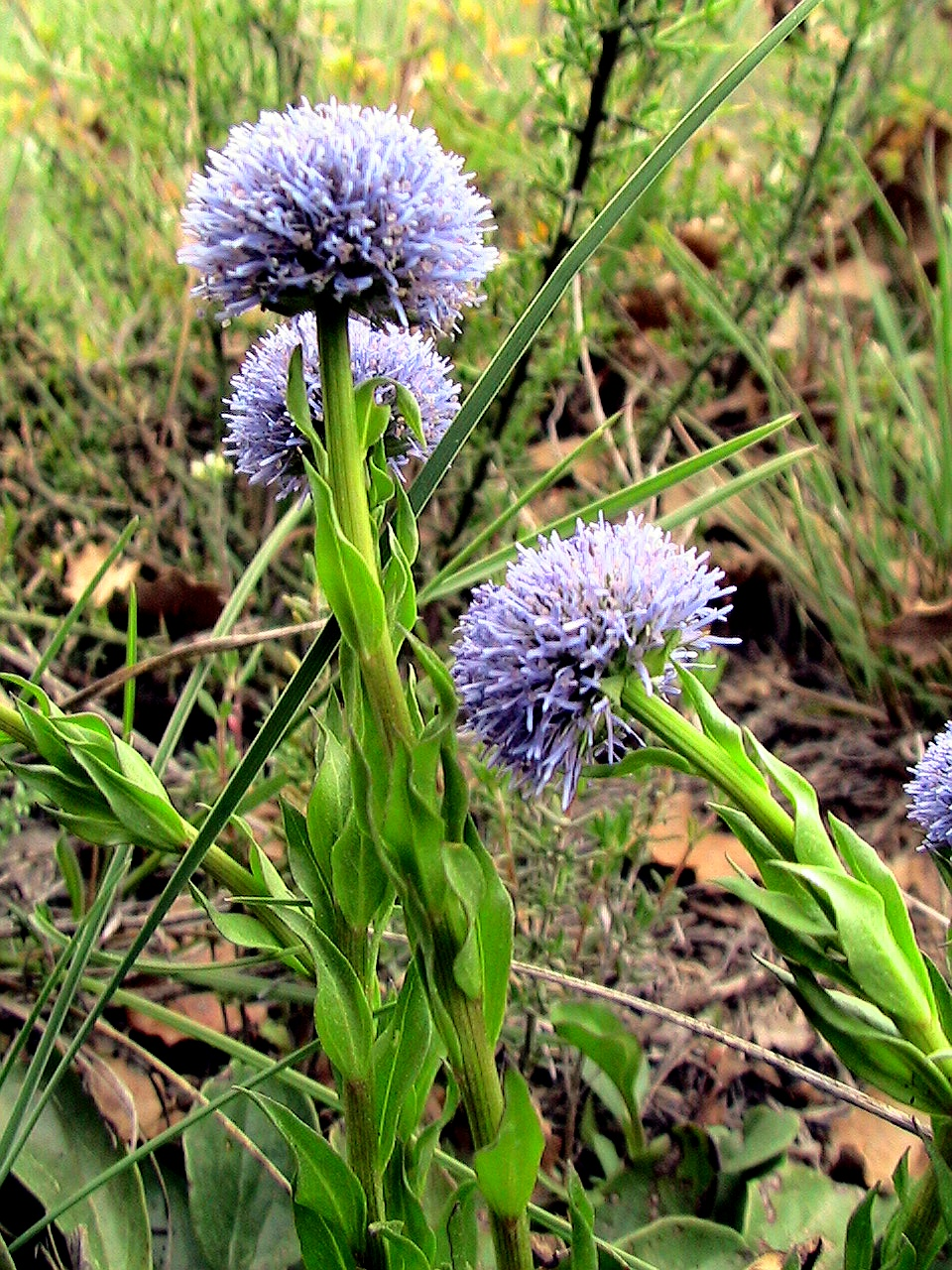
Globularia

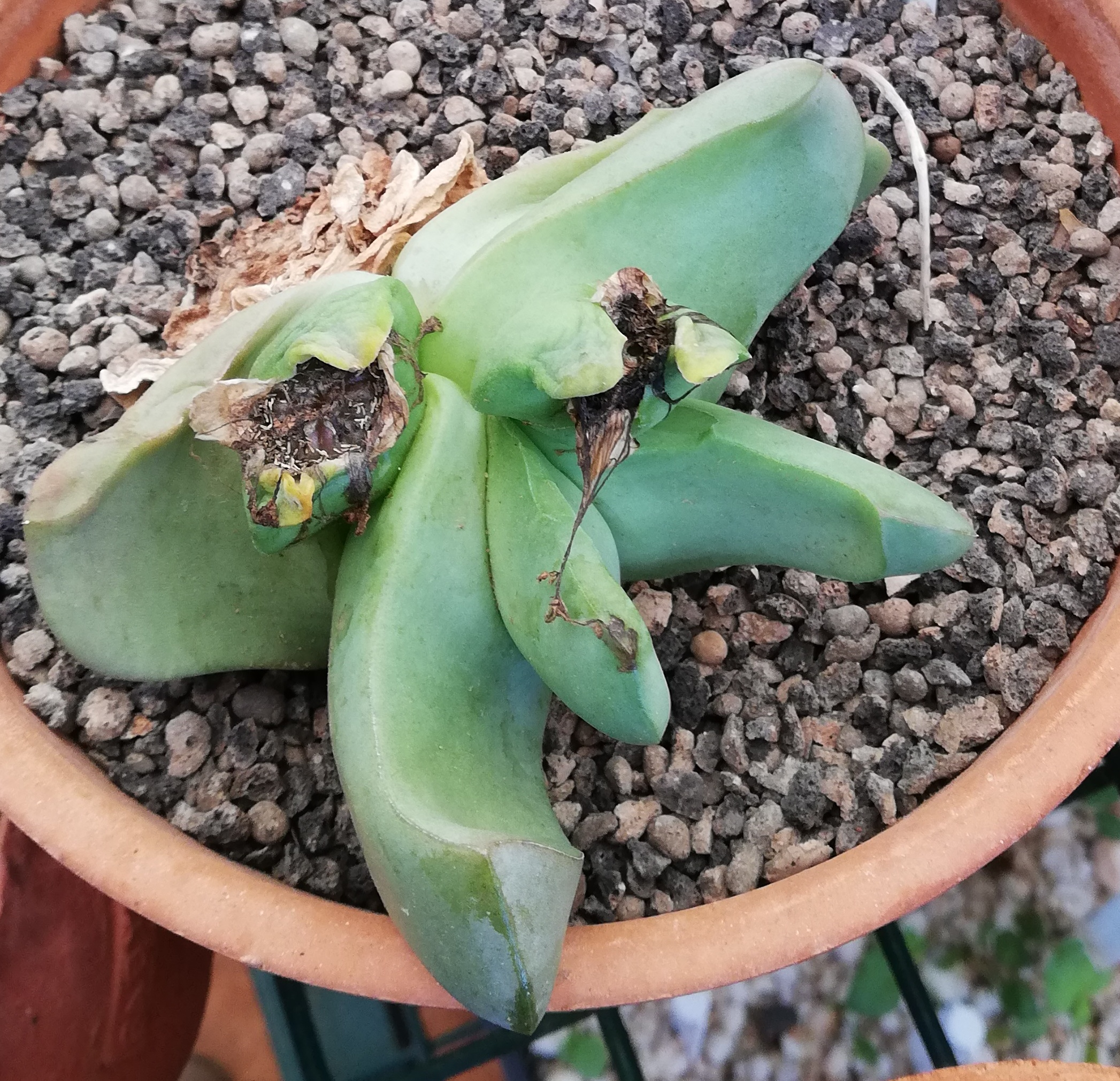
Glottiphyllum

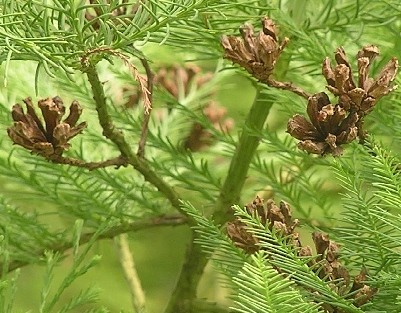
Glyptostrobus

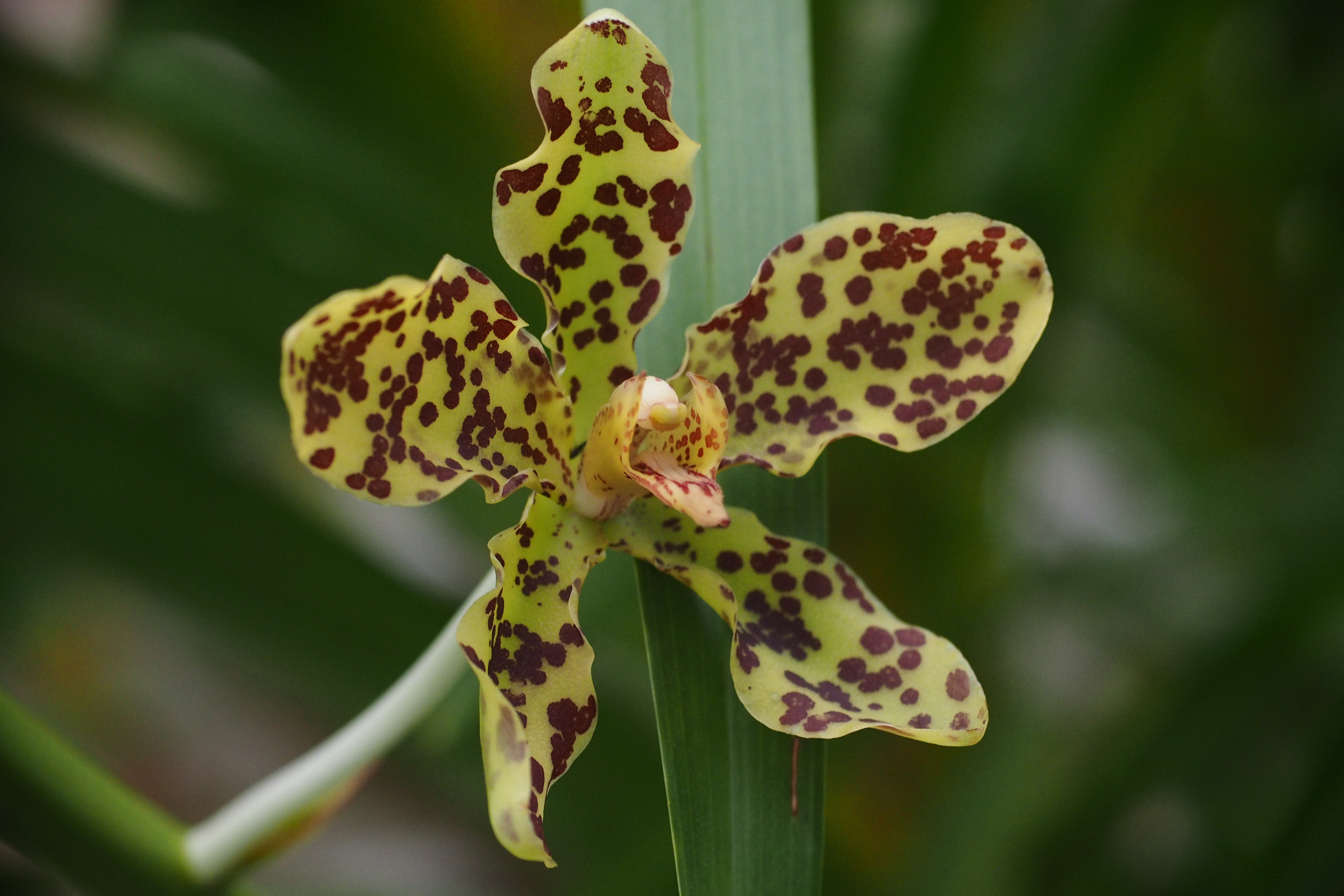
Grammatophyllum

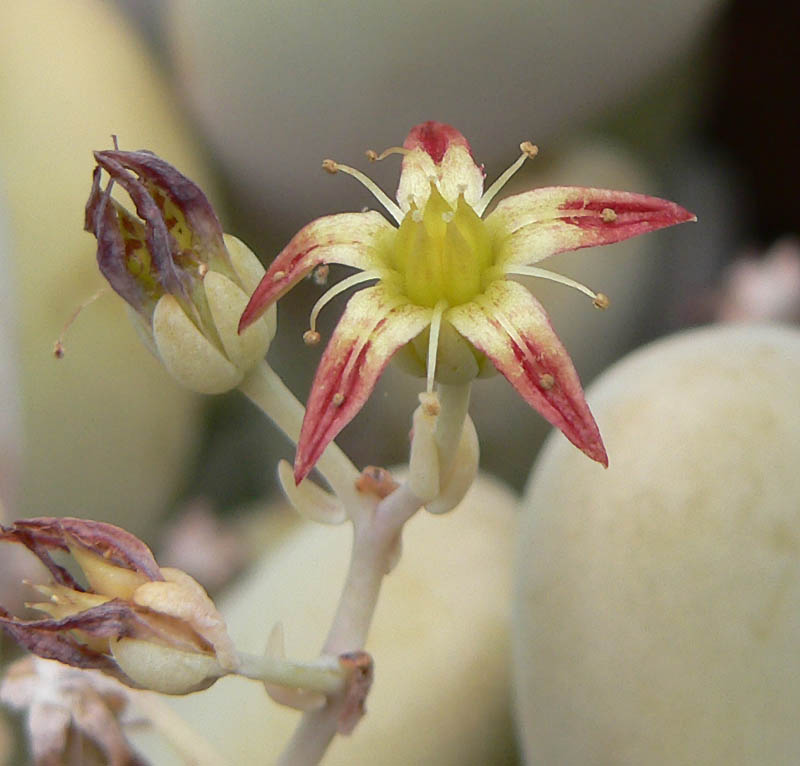
Graptopetalum

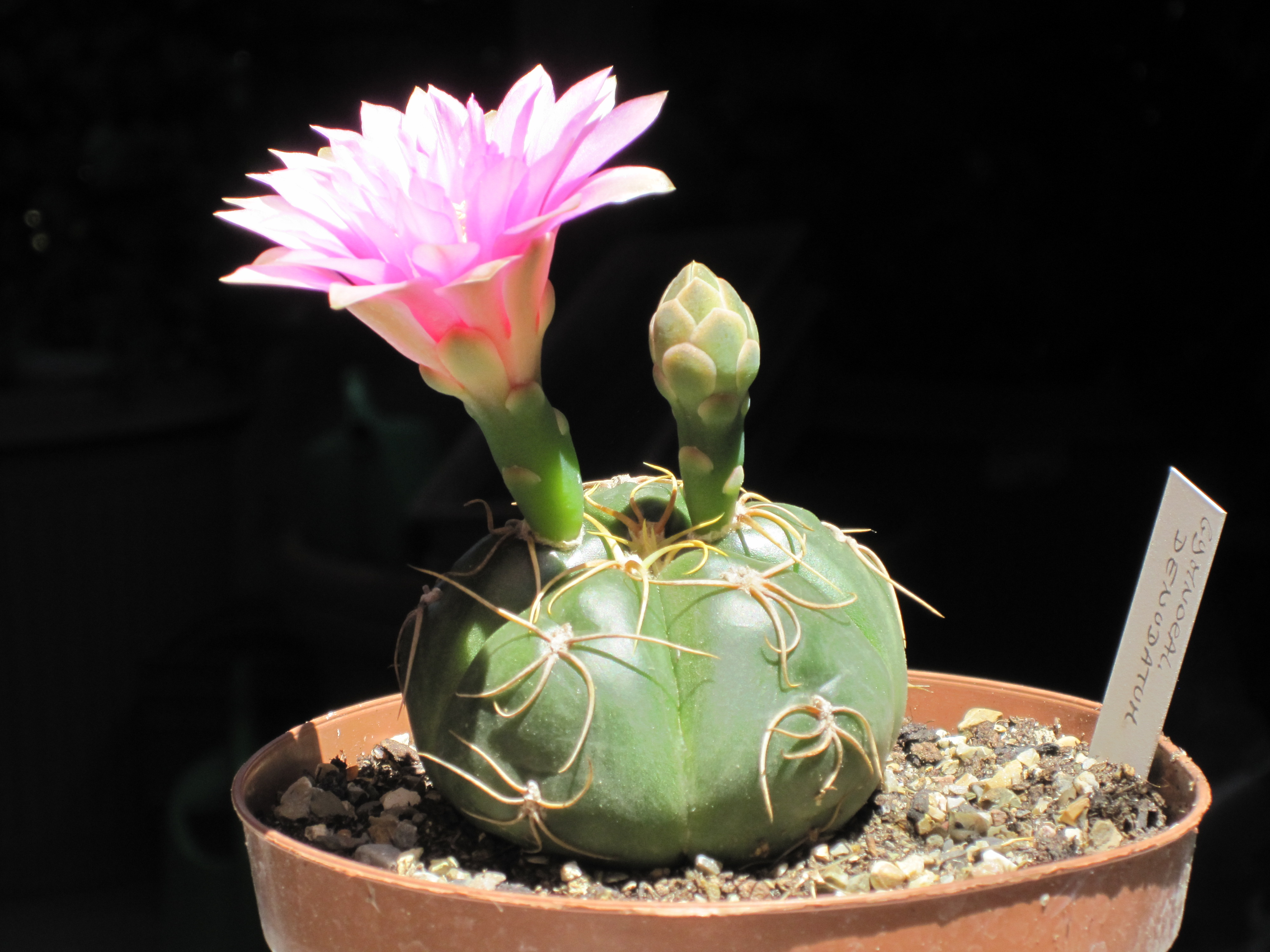
Gymnocalycium

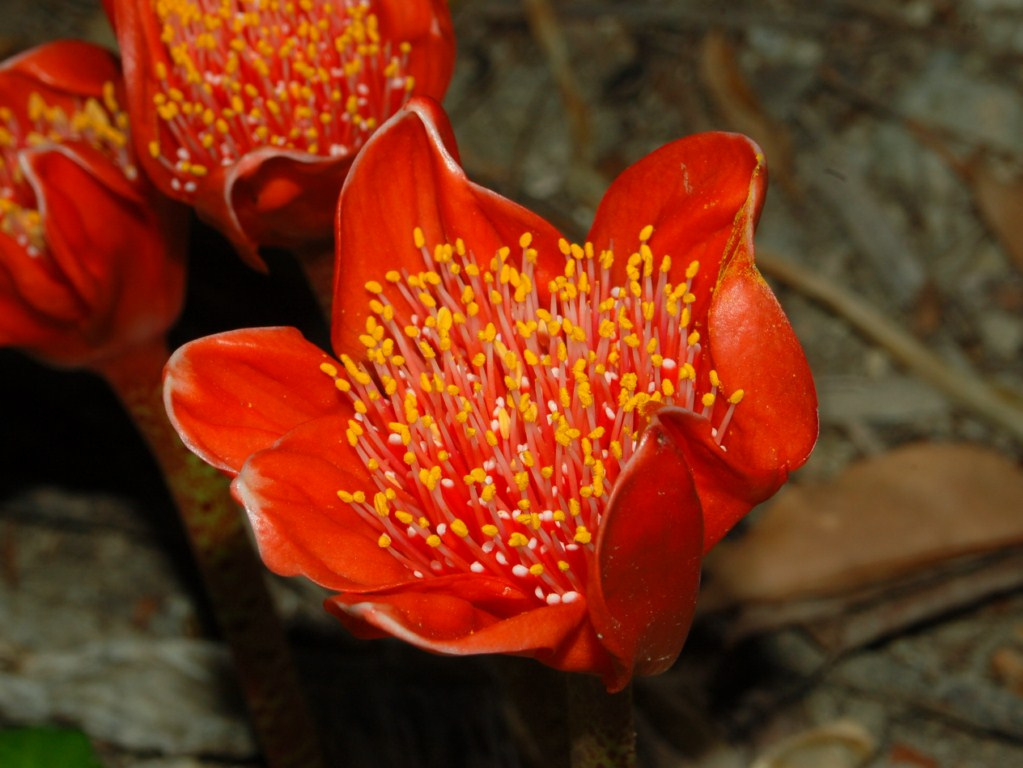
Haemanthus

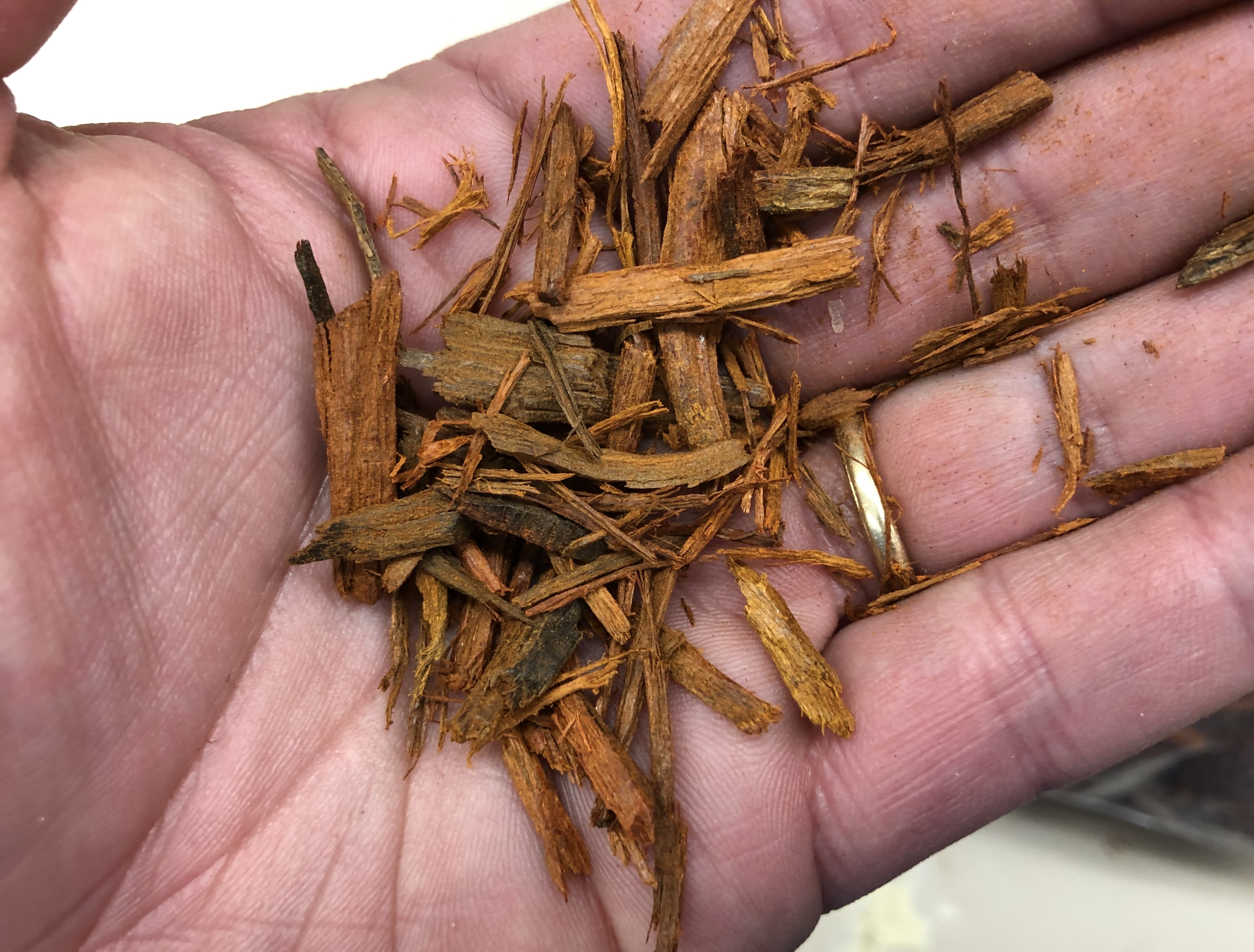
Haematoxylum wood chips

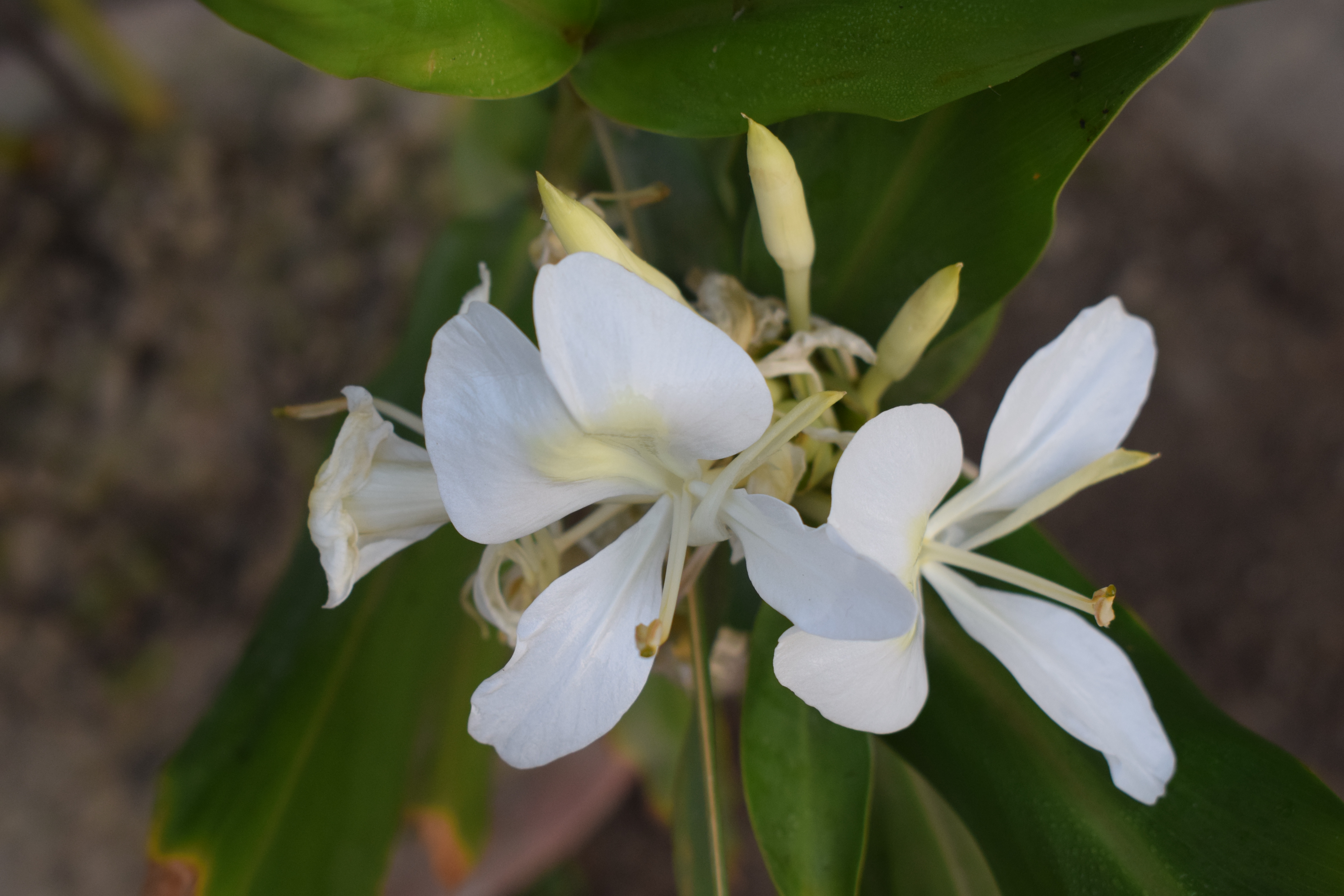
Hedychium

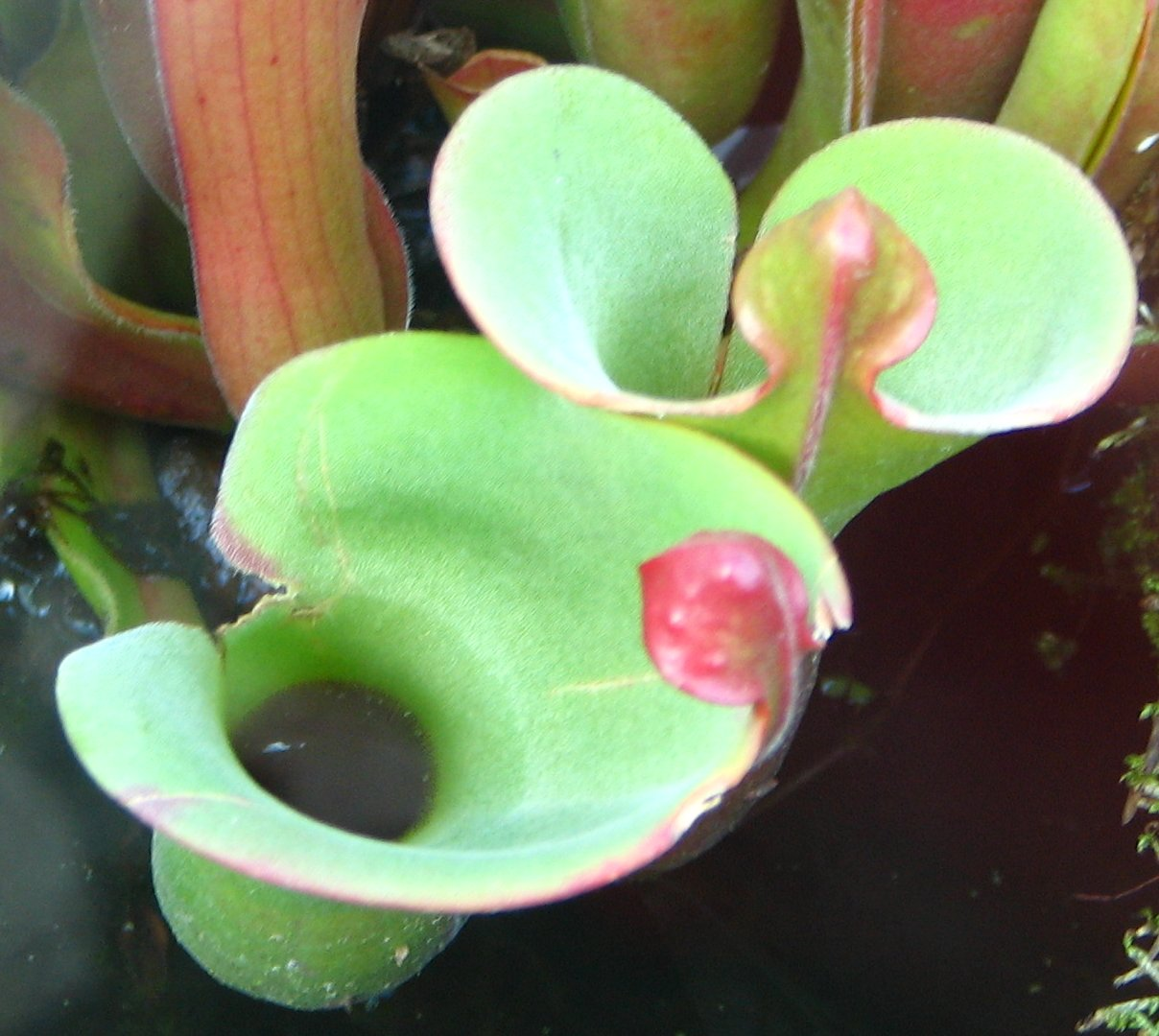
Heliamphora

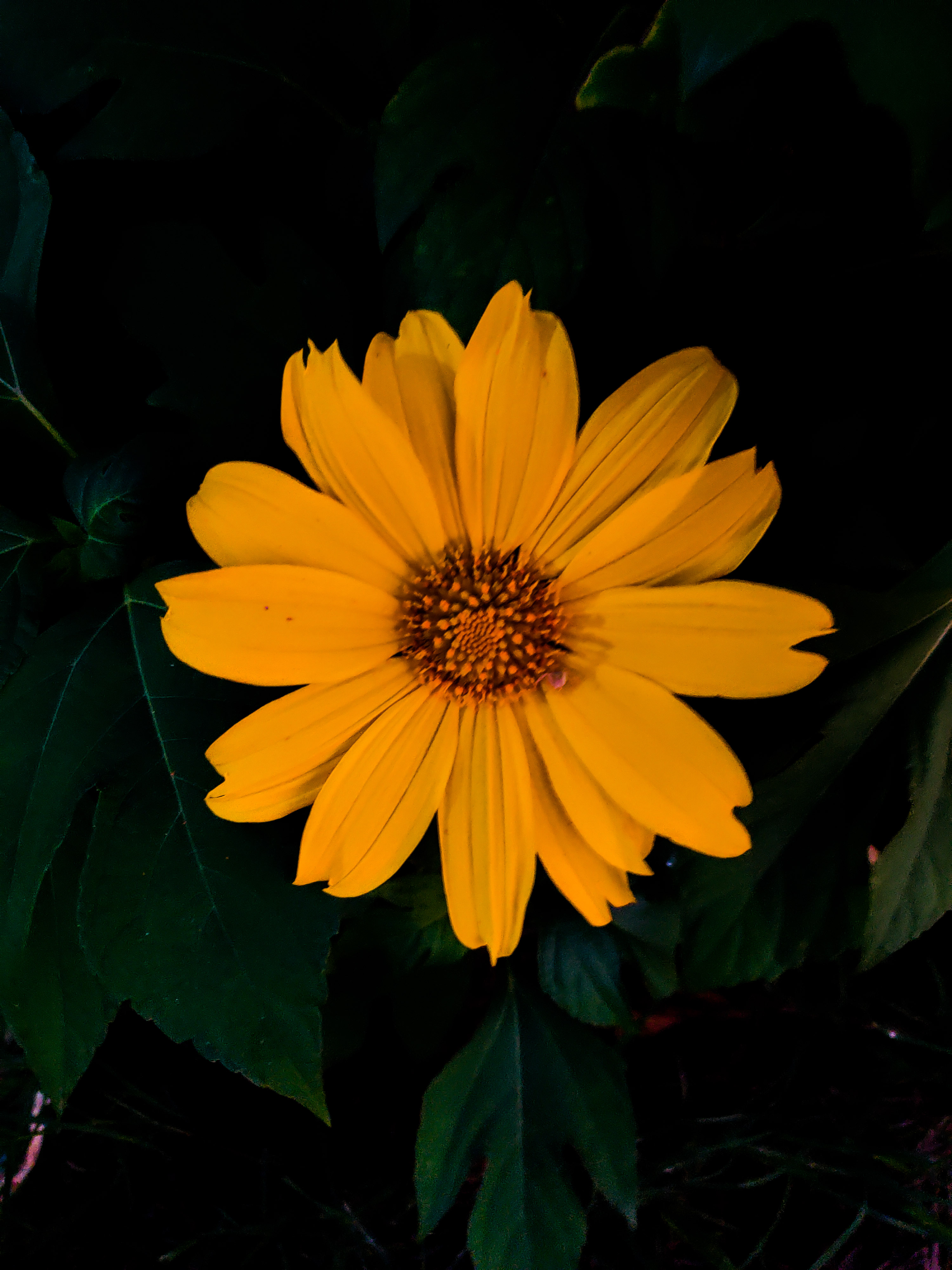
Helianthus

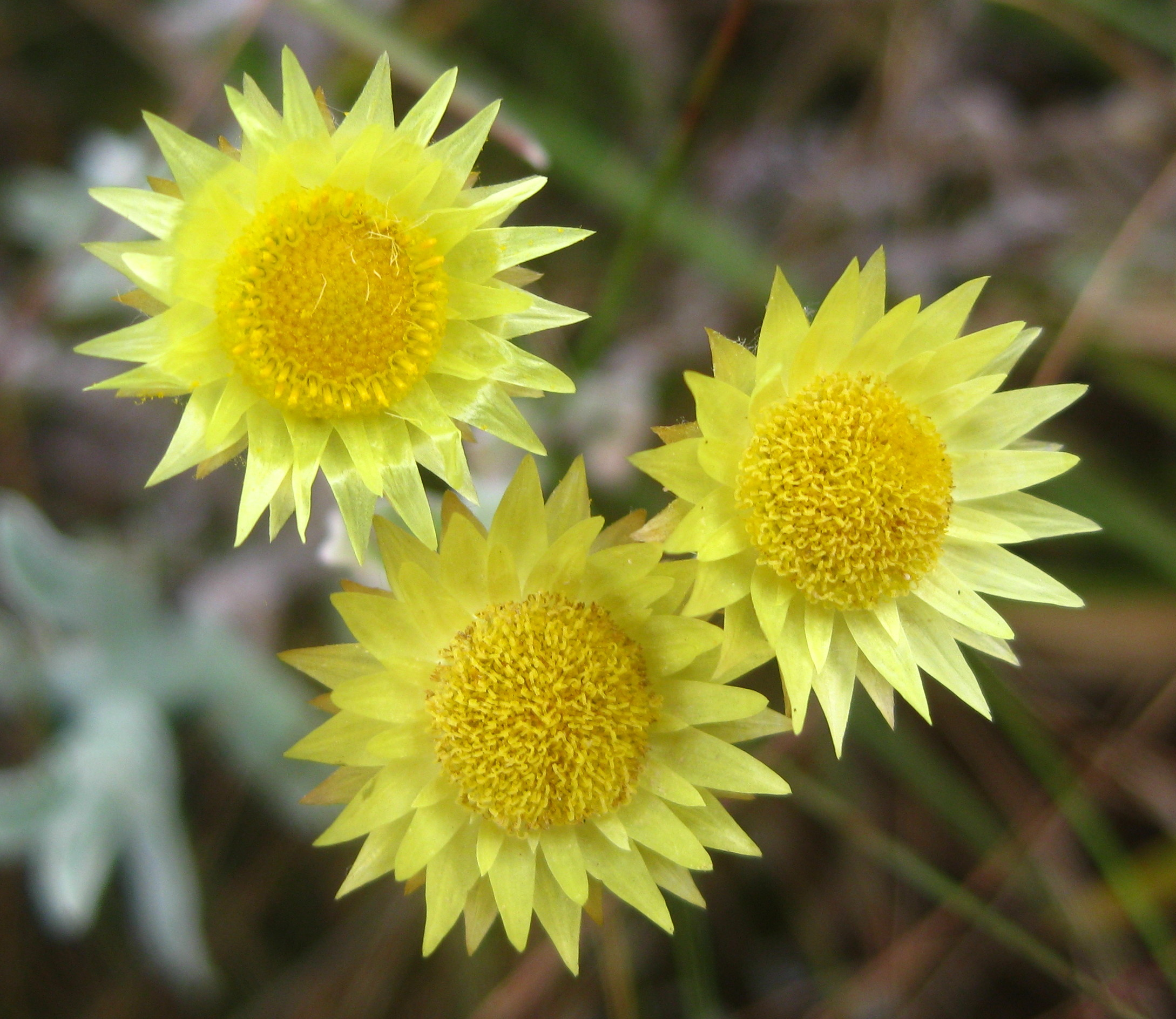
Helichrysum

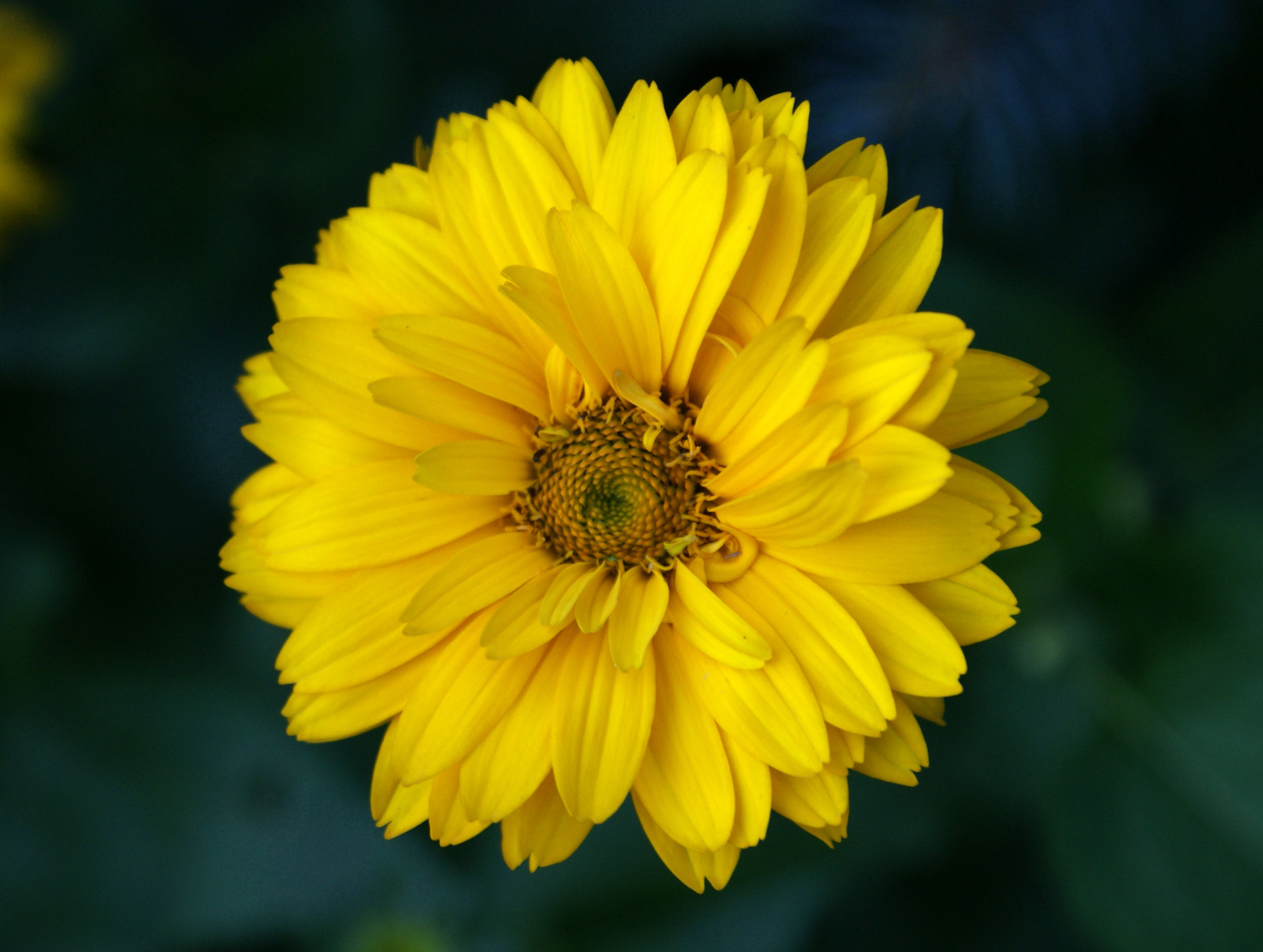
Heliopsis

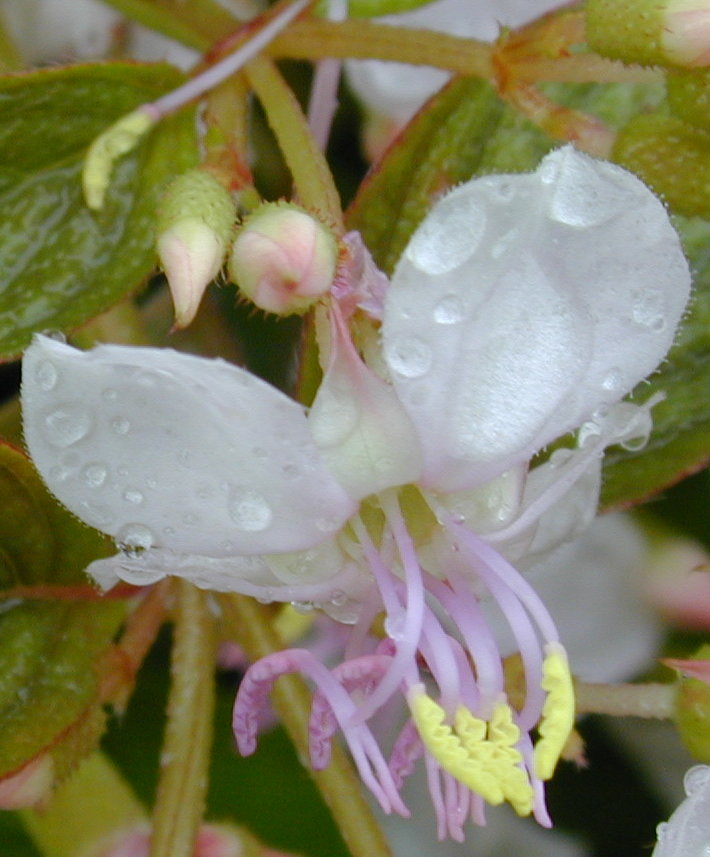
Heterocentron

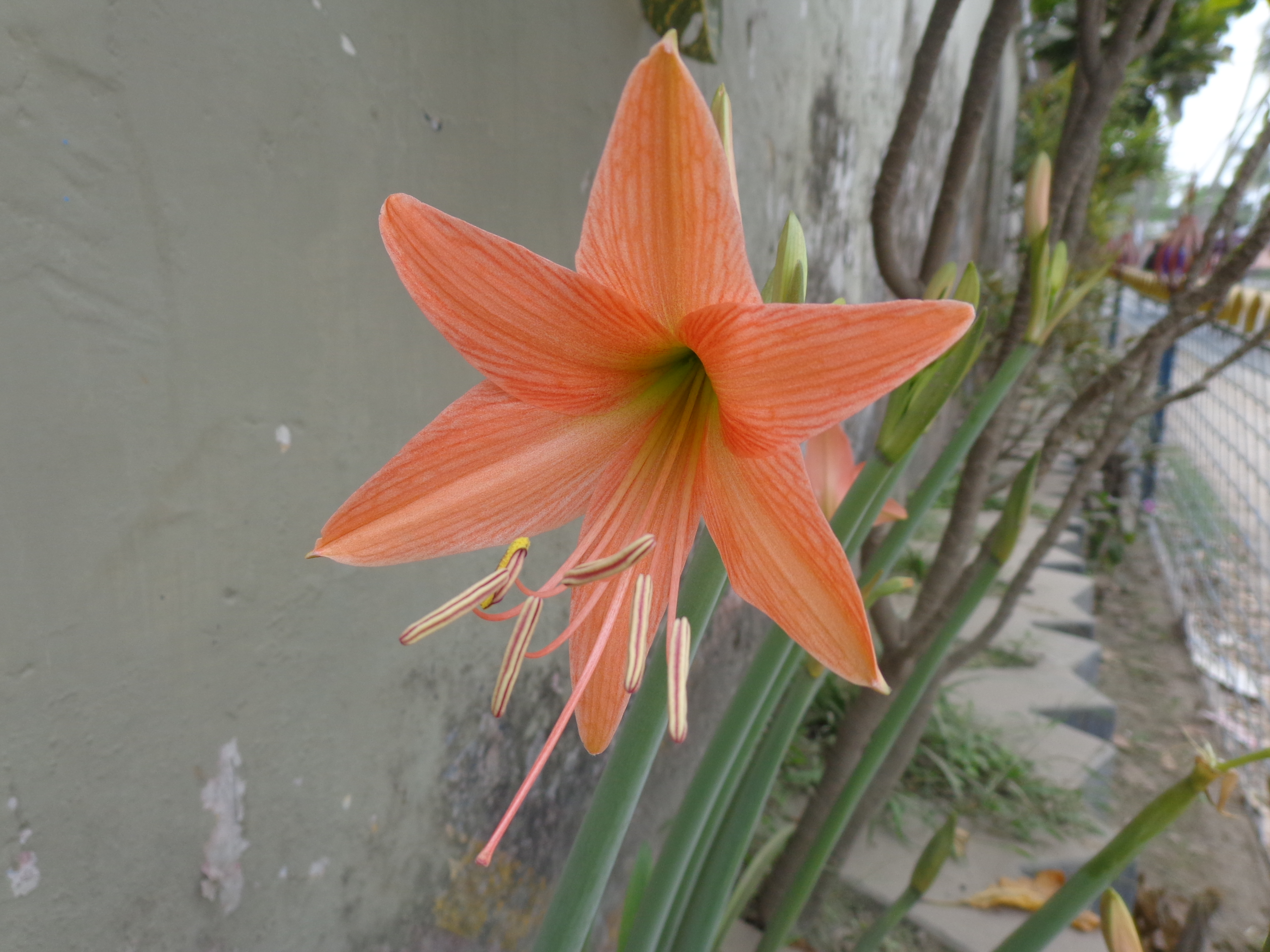
Hippeastrum

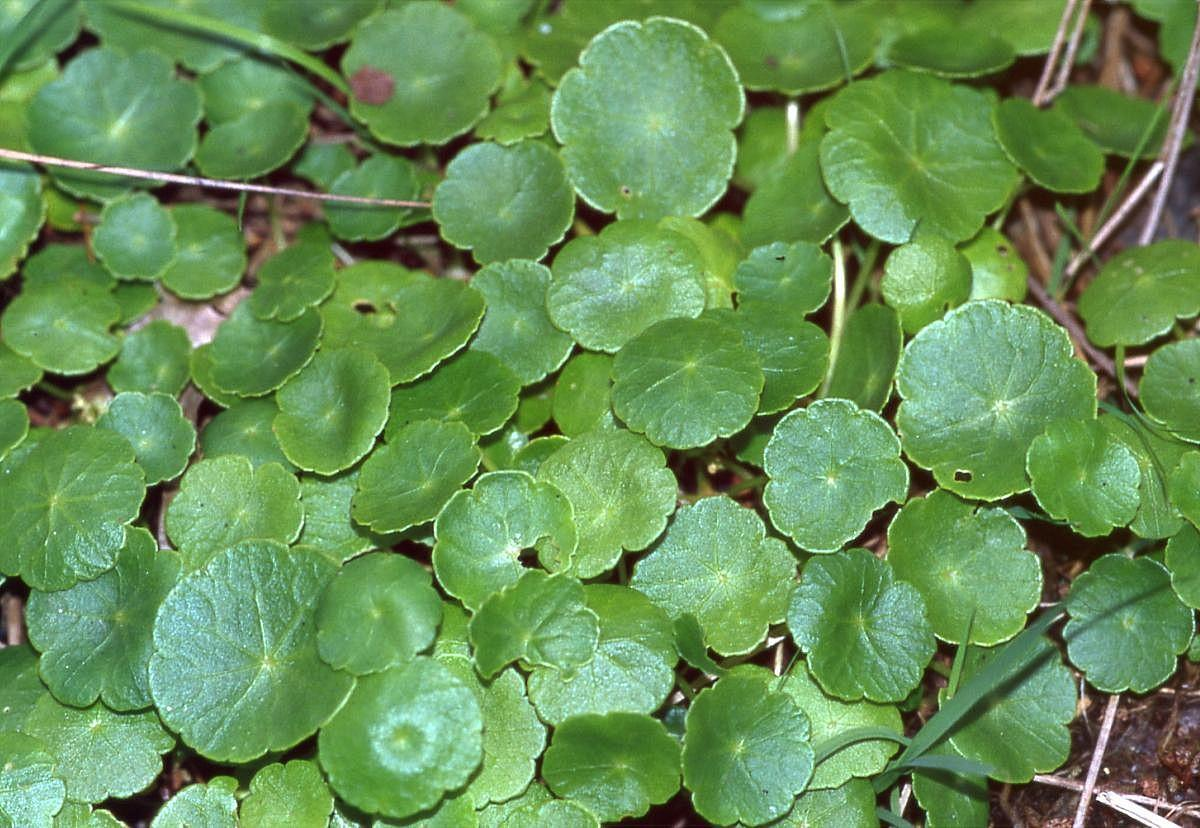
Hydrocotyle

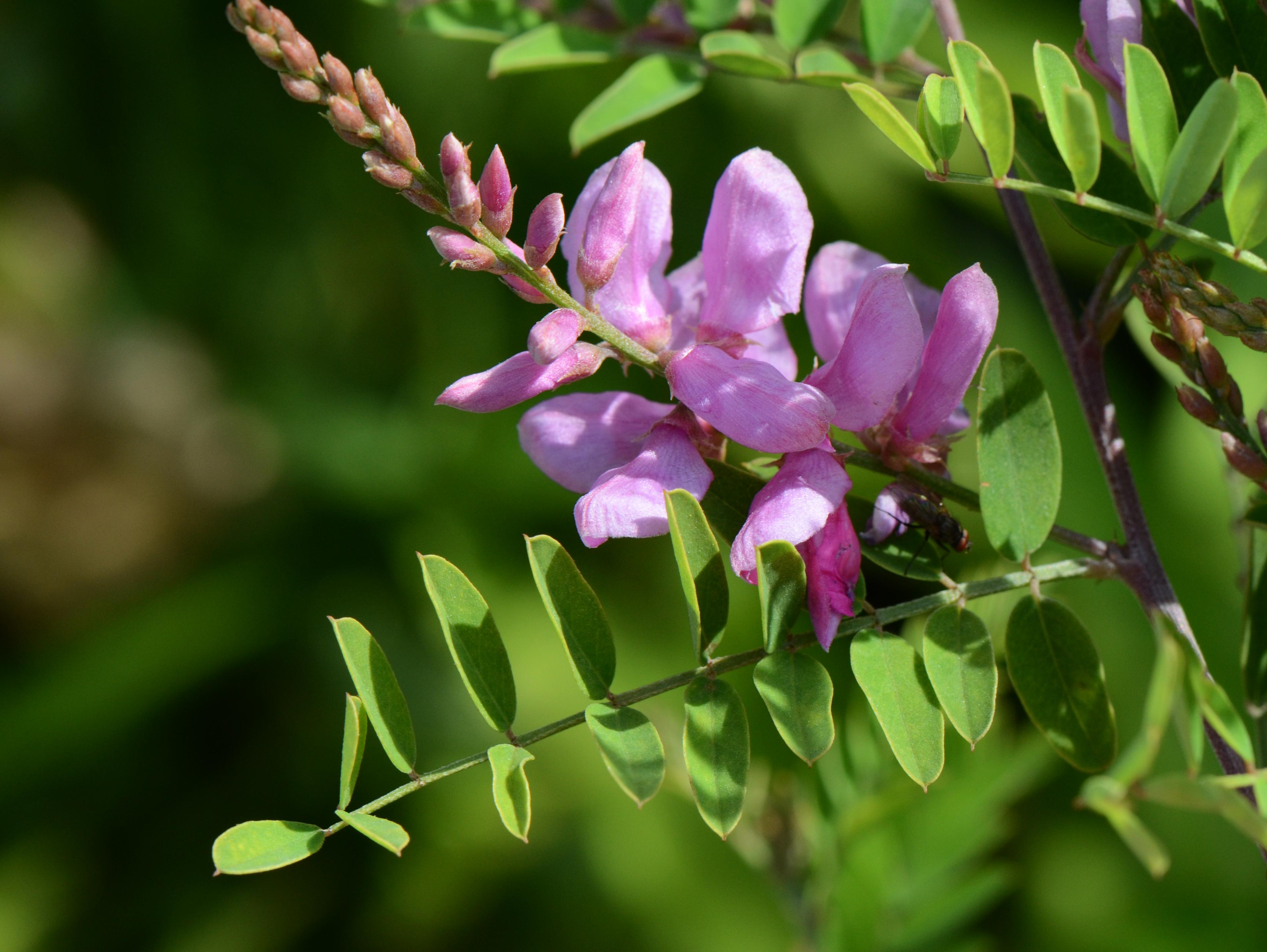
Indigofera

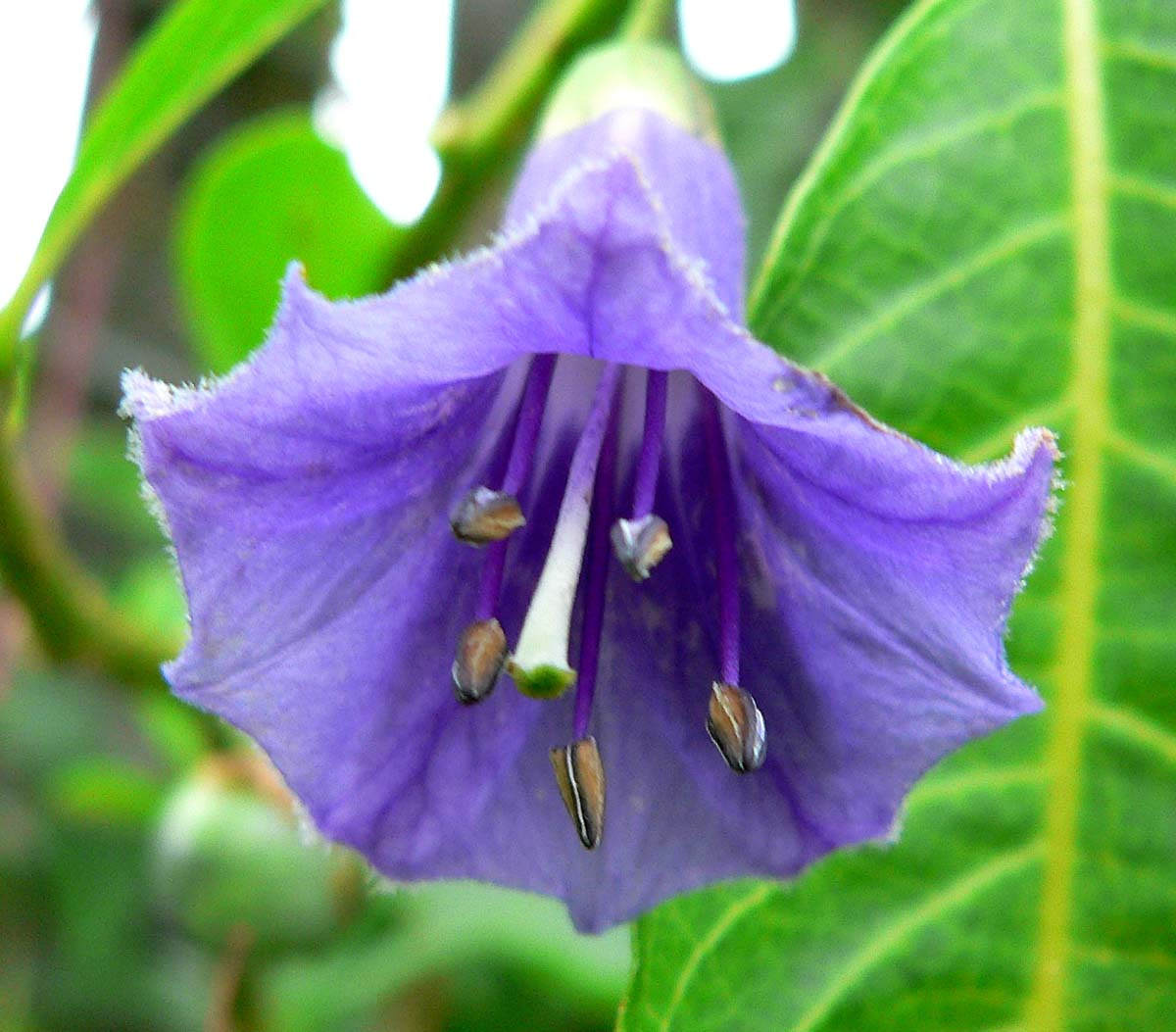
Iochroma

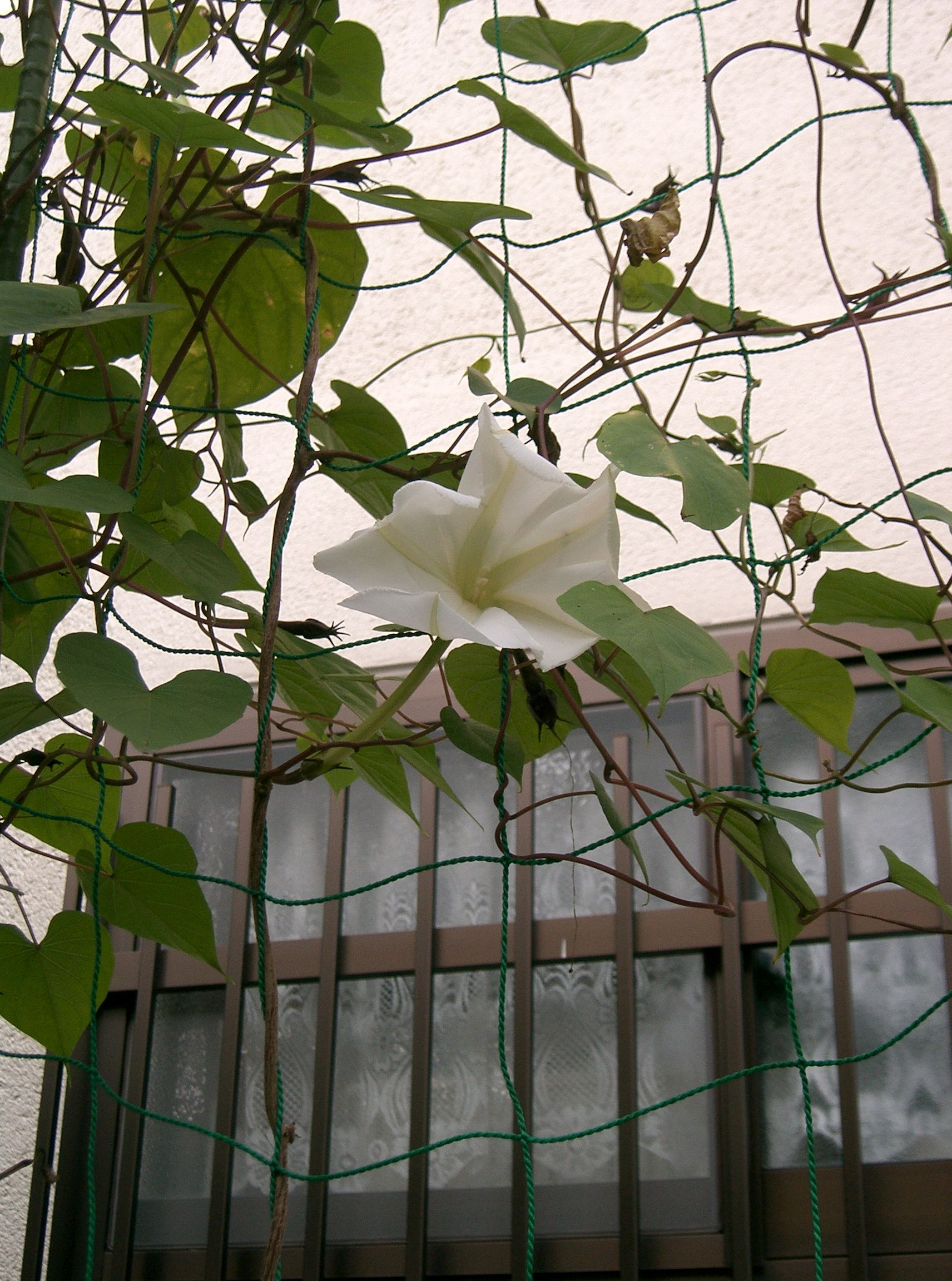
Ipomoea

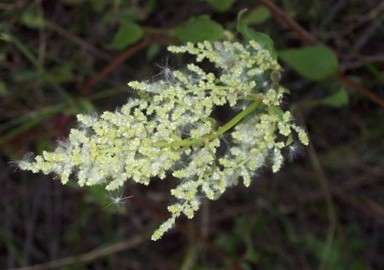
Iresine

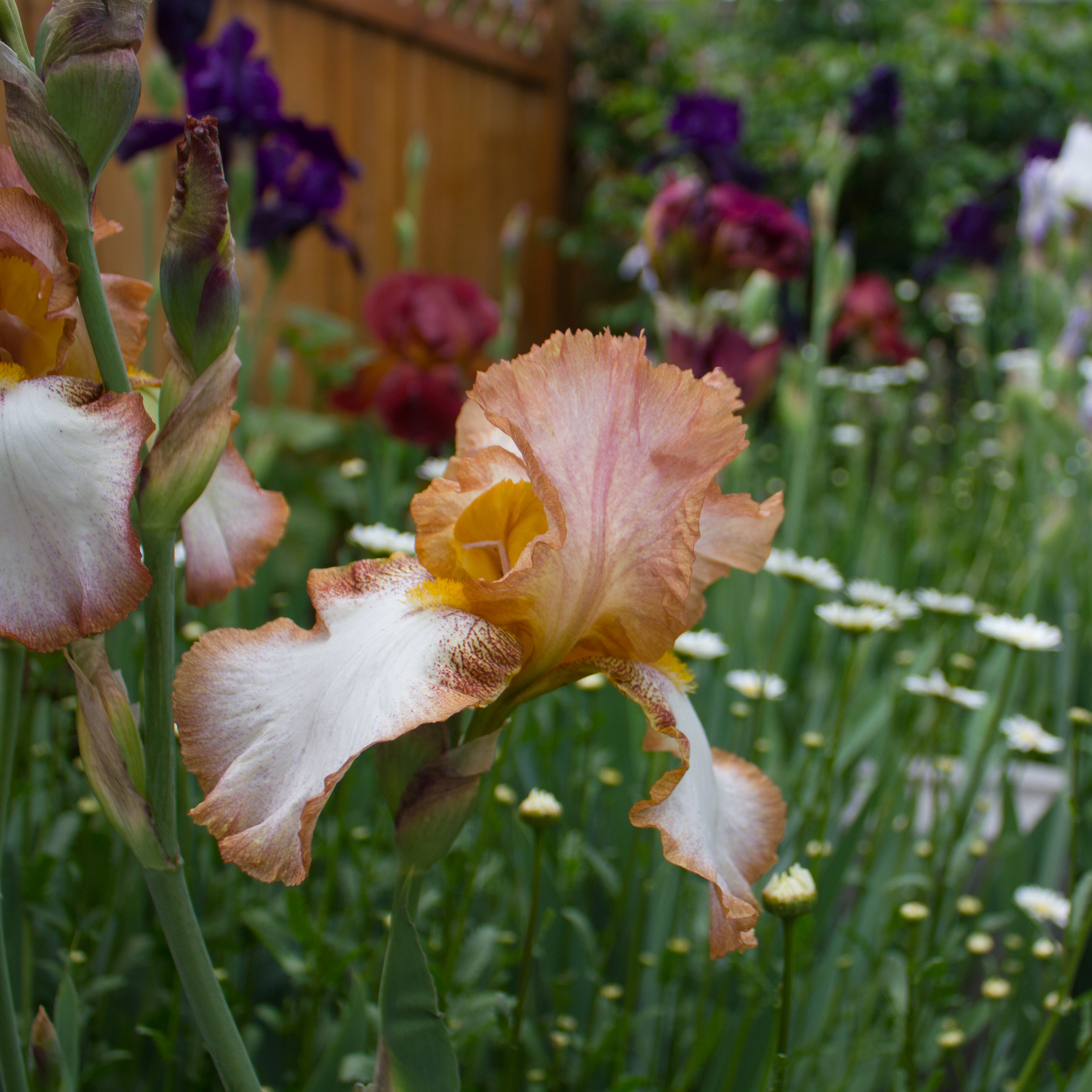
Iris

Genera
Genus (Note: Page numbers for references are omitted, since all the references list genera alphabetically except for Plants of the World, which is mainly cited for genera that match their family names.)	Meaning or derivation	Family	Order	Ref	G
Dacrydium	teardrop (the resin)	Podocarpaceae	Pinales	CS	G
Dactylicapnos	finger + smoke	Papaveraceae	Ranunculales	Ba	
Dactylis	Greek and Latin name (Note: "(Language) name" means the name of some plant originally, not necessarily in this genus.)	Poaceae	Poales	CS	G
Dactylorhiza	finger root (the tubers)	Orchidaceae	Asparagales	CS	
Daemonorops	demon shrub (the sharp hooks)	Arecaceae	Arecales	St	G
Dais	torch (the flower heads)	Thymelaeaceae	Malvales	St	G
Damasonium	Greek name	Alismataceae	Alismatales	St	G
Danae	Danaë of mythology (Note: This list includes fictional and unattested characters; also see List of plant genera named after people (D–J).)	Asparagaceae	Asparagales	CS	G
Danais	Danaïdes, or Danais, a nymph	Rubiaceae	Gentianales	Bu	
Daphne	Daphne of mythology	Thymelaeaceae	Malvales	CS	G
Daphniphyllum	leaves like Daphne	Daphniphyllaceae	Saxifragales	CS	G
Dasiphora	hair-bearing	Rosaceae	Rosales	Ba	
Dasylirion	thick lily	Asparagaceae	Asparagales	CS	G
Datisca	Greek and Latin name	Datiscaceae	Cucurbitales	CS	G
Datura	Sanskrit and Arabic name	Solanaceae	Solanales	CS	G
Daucus	Latin name	Apiaceae	Apiales	CS	G
Decazyx	Decatropidinae + Xanthoxyleae, two subtribes of Rutaceae	Rutaceae	Sapindales	Bu	
Decodon	ten teeth (on the calyx)	Lythraceae	Myrtales	St	G
Decumaria	ten (flower parts)	Hydrangeaceae	Cornales	CS	G
Deianira	Deianira, a mythological princess	Gentianaceae	Gentianales	Bu	
Deidamia	Deidamia, a mythological princess	Passifloraceae	Malpighiales	Bu	
Deinanthe	amazing flowers	Hydrangeaceae	Cornales	St	G
Delonix	prominent claw (on the petals)	Fabaceae	Fabales	St	G
Delosperma	visible seeds (inside the capsule)	Aizoaceae	Caryophyllales	CS	G
Delostoma	visible mouth (the open flowers)	Bignoniaceae	Lamiales	St	G
Delphinium	Greek name	Ranunculaceae	Ranunculales	CS	G
Dendrobium	tree life (growing on trees)	Orchidaceae	Asparagales	St	G
Dendrocalamus	tree reed	Poaceae	Poales	St	G
Dendrochilum	tree lips	Orchidaceae	Asparagales	St	G
Dendromecon	tree poppy	Papaveraceae	Ranunculales	CS	G
Dendropanax	tree Panax	Araliaceae	Apiales	St	G
Denmoza	anagram of Mendoza, a province of Argentina	Cactaceae	Caryophyllales	St	
Derris	leather covering (the seed pods)	Fabaceae	Fabales	St	
Desmanthus	bundled flower (the clusters)	Fabaceae	Fabales	CS	G
Desmodium	chain (the fruit)	Fabaceae	Fabales	CS	G
Desmoncus	chain hook (the leaf tips)	Arecaceae	Arecales	St	G
Deverra	Deverra, a goddess	Apiaceae	Apiales	Bu	
Dianella	Diana of mythology + little	Asphodelaceae	Asparagales	CS	G
Dianthus	Greek name	Caryophyllaceae	Caryophyllales	CS	G
Diapensia	Greek name	Diapensiaceae	Ericales	St	G
Diascia	two sacs (on the flowers)	Scrophulariaceae	Lamiales	CS	G
Dicentra	two spurs (on the flowers)	Papaveraceae	Ranunculales	CS	G
Dichelostemma	split wreath	Asparagaceae	Asparagales	Ba	G
Dichondra	two lumps (the capsules)	Convolvulaceae	Solanales	St	G
Dichorisandra	two separate male parts (the two stamens that diverge)	Commelinaceae	Commelinales	St	G
Dichroa	two colours (the flowers)	Hydrangeaceae	Cornales	CS	G
Dicliptera	double-folding wings (within the capsules)	Acanthaceae	Lamiales	CS	G
Dicranostigma	forked stigmas	Papaveraceae	Ranunculales	St	G
Dictamnus	Greek name	Rutaceae	Sapindales	CS	G
Dictyosperma	net seeds	Arecaceae	Arecales	St	G
Didymocarpus	double fruit (the separable capsule)	Gesneriaceae	Lamiales	St	G
Diegodendron	Diego-Suarez (present-day Antsiranana in northern Madagascar) + tree	Bixaceae	Malvales	Bu	
Dierama	funnel (the flowers)	Iridaceae	Asparagales	CS	G
Dietes	two years or two close relations (within Iridaceae)	Iridaceae	Asparagales	Ba	G
Digitalis	derived from Latin: finger (the flowers)	Plantaginaceae	Lamiales	CS	G
Digitaria	Latin: finger-like	Poaceae	Poales	Ba	G
Dimorphotheca	two shapes of containers (the achenes)	Asteraceae	Asterales	St	G
Dionaea	Dione of mythology	Droseraceae	Caryophyllales	CS	G
Dionysia	Dionysus, a god	Primulaceae	Ericales	Bu	G
Dioon	two-egged (the pairs of seeds)	Zamiaceae	Cycadales	St	G
Diosma	divine scent	Rutaceae	Sapindales	St	G
Diospyros	Greek name	Ebenaceae	Ericales	CS	G
Dipcadi	Turkish name	Asparagaceae	Asparagales	St	G
Diphylleia	two leaves	Berberidaceae	Ranunculales	St	G
Diplarrena	two male parts (the fertile stamens). Previously Diplarrhena.	Iridaceae	Asparagales	CS	G
Diploglottis	double-tongued (petal scales)	Sapindaceae	Sapindales	St	
Dipsacus	thirst (some leaves collect water)	Caprifoliaceae	Dipsacales	CS	G
Dipteronia	two-winged (fruit)	Sapindaceae	Sapindales	St	G
Dirca	fountain of Dirce (the wet habitats)	Thymelaeaceae	Malvales	St	G
Disa	Disa of legend	Orchidaceae	Asparagales	St	G
Disanthus	paired flowers	Hamamelidaceae	Saxifragales	CS	G
Discaria	disc (on the flowers)	Rhamnaceae	Rosales	St	G
Dischidia	two divisions	Apocynaceae	Gentianales	Ba	
Discocactus	disc cactus	Cactaceae	Caryophyllales	St	
Diselma	two upper decks	Cupressaceae	Pinales	Ba	
Disocactus	co-equal cactus (there are as many sepals as petals)	Cactaceae	Caryophyllales	St	
Disporopsis	Disporum-like	Asparagaceae	Asparagales	Ba	G
Disporum	two seeds	Colchicaceae	Liliales	CS	G
Distylium	two styles	Hamamelidaceae	Saxifragales	St	G
Diuris	two tails (the two longest sepals)	Orchidaceae	Asparagales	St	G
Docynia	anagram of Cydonia	Rosaceae	Rosales	St	G
Dolichandra	long male parts	Bignoniaceae	Lamiales	St	
Dolichos	Greek and Latin name	Fabaceae	Fabales	St	G
Donax	Greek and Latin name	Marantaceae	Zingiberales	St	G
Doronicum	Arabic name	Asteraceae	Asterales	CS	G
Doryanthes	spear of flowers	Doryanthaceae	Asparagales	St	G
Dovyalis	(unclear)	Salicaceae	Malpighiales	St	
Draba	Greek name	Brassicaceae	Brassicales	St	G
Dracaena	dragon	Asparagaceae	Asparagales	CS	G
Dracocephalum	dragon head (the flowers)	Lamiaceae	Lamiales	St	G
Dracophyllum	dragon leaves	Ericaceae	Ericales	Ba	G
Dracula	little dragon	Orchidaceae	Asparagales	St	G
Dracunculus	little dragon (the spathe). Latin name.	Araceae	Alismatales	CS	G
Drimia	pungent	Asparagaceae	Asparagales	St	G
Drimiopsis	Drimia-like	Asparagaceae	Asparagales	St	G
Drimys	pungent	Winteraceae	Canellales	CS	G
Drosanthemum	dew flowers	Aizoaceae	Caryophyllales	St	G
Drosera	dew (the secretions)	Droseraceae	Caryophyllales	St	G
Dryadella	dryads (tree nymphs)	Orchidaceae	Asparagales	Bu	
Dryas	dryad	Rosaceae	Rosales	CS	G
Drypis	Greek name	Caryophyllaceae	Caryophyllales	St	G
Durio	Malayan name	Malvaceae	Malvales	St	G
Dyschoriste	hard to separate, or hardly separated	Acanthaceae	Lamiales	St	G
Dysosma	bad smell	Berberidaceae	Ranunculales	CS	
Dysoxylum	bad wood (the smell)	Meliaceae	Sapindales	St	
Ebenus	Greek and Latin name	Fabaceae	Fabales	St	G
Ecballium	ejection (the ripe seeds are forcefully ejected)	Cucurbitaceae	Cucurbitales	St	G
Eccremocarpus	hanging fruit	Bignoniaceae	Lamiales	CS	G
Echidnopsis	viper-like (the stems)	Apocynaceae	Gentianales	St	
Echinacea	hedgehog (the spiny scales) (Note: Here and following, the Greek echinos is sometimes translated "sea urchin".)	Asteraceae	Asterales	CS	G
Echinocactus	hedgehog cactus	Cactaceae	Caryophyllales	St	G
Echinocereus	hedgehog Cereus (the spiny fruit)	Cactaceae	Caryophyllales	St	G
Echinochloa	hedgehog grass	Poaceae	Poales	St	G
Echinocystis	hedgehog bladder (the fruit)	Cucurbitaceae	Cucurbitales	St	
Echinodorus	hedgehog bag or spear	Alismataceae	Alismatales	St	G
Echinops	hedgehog-like (the thistle's flower heads)	Asteraceae	Asterales	CS	G
Echinopsis	hedgehog-like (the round cactus)	Cactaceae	Caryophyllales	St	
Echites	viper (the poisonous, entwining branches)	Apocynaceae	Gentianales	St	G
Echium	Greek name	Boraginaceae	Boraginales	CS	G
Edraianthus	sitting (sessile) flowers	Campanulaceae	Asterales	St	G
Eidothea	Eidothea, a mythological figure	Proteaceae	Proteales	Bu	
Elaeagnus	Greek name	Elaeagnaceae	Rosales	CS	G
Elaeis	olive (oil)	Arecaceae	Arecales	St	G
Elaeocarpus	olive (oil) fruit	Elaeocarpaceae	Oxalidales	St	G
Elaeodendron	olive tree	Celastraceae	Celastrales	St	
Elatine	Greek and Latin name	Elatinaceae	Malpighiales	St	G
Elatostema	springing male parts (the erect stamens)	Urticaceae	Rosales	St	G
Elegia	elegy	Restionaceae	Poales	Ba	
Elettaria	Malabar name	Zingiberaceae	Zingiberales	St	G
Eleusine	Eleusis (and its temple)	Poaceae	Poales	St	G
Eleutherococcus	unbound berries	Araliaceae	Apiales	Ba	G
Elleanthus	Helle (a mythological princess) + flower	Orchidaceae	Asparagales	Bu	
Elodea	marshy	Hydrocharitaceae	Alismatales	St	G
Elymus	Greek name	Poaceae	Poales	CS	G
Embothrium	in a little pit (the anthers)	Proteaceae	Proteales	CS	G
Emilia	(unknown)	Asteraceae	Asterales	St	G
Emmenanthe	lasting flowers	Hydrophyllaceae	Boraginales	St	
Emmenopterys	lasting wing (part of the calyx)	Rubiaceae	Gentianales	St	G
Empetrum	(living) on rocks. Greek name.	Ericaceae	Ericales	St	G
Encelia	(unclear)	Asteraceae	Asterales	St	G
Encephalartos	in-head-bread (the mealy, edible tops of the trunks)	Zamiaceae	Cycadales	St	G
Encyclia	encircling	Orchidaceae	Asparagales	Ba	
Enkianthus	pregnant flower (the first-named species of this genus has petal-like bracts surrounding the flowers)	Ericaceae	Ericales	CS	G
Ensete	Amharic name	Musaceae	Zingiberales	Ba	G
Entada	Malabar name	Fabaceae	Fabales	St	G
Entelea	complete (the fertile stamens)	Malvaceae	Malvales	St	G
Eomecon	Greek name	Papaveraceae	Ranunculales	CS	G
Epacris	summit-dwelling	Ericaceae	Ericales	St	G
Ephedra	Greek and Latin name	Ephedraceae	Ephedrales	St	G
Epidendrum	on trees	Orchidaceae	Asparagales	St	G
Epigaea	on the earth (the branches)	Ericaceae	Ericales	St	G
Epilobium	on pods (the flowers)	Onagraceae	Myrtales	CS	G
Epimedium	Greek name	Berberidaceae	Ranunculales	CS	G
Epipactis	Greek and Latin name	Orchidaceae	Asparagales	CS	G
Epiphyllum	on leaves (the leaf-like flower stalks)	Cactaceae	Caryophyllales	St	G
Epipremnum	(growing) on tree trunks	Araceae	Alismatales	Ba	G
Episcia	in the shade	Gesneriaceae	Lamiales	St	G
Epithelantha	nipple-borne flowers (on tubercles)	Cactaceae	Caryophyllales	St	G
Eragrostis	love grass (the heart-shaped spikelets)	Poaceae	Poales	CS	G
Eranthemum	Greek name	Acanthaceae	Lamiales	St	G
Eranthis	springtime flowers	Ranunculaceae	Ranunculales	CS	G
Erato	Erato, a Muse	Asteraceae	Asterales	Bu	
Eremaea	solitary (flowers)	Myrtaceae	Myrtales	St	
Eremanthus	solitary flowers	Asteraceae	Asterales	St	G
Eremophila	desert-loving	Scrophulariaceae	Lamiales	St	G
Eremurus	desert tail (the large flower spikes)	Asphodelaceae	Asparagales	CS	G
Erepsia	roofed (the covered stamens)	Aizoaceae	Caryophyllales	St	
Eria	wool (on the flowers)	Orchidaceae	Asparagales	St	
Erica	Greek and Latin name	Ericaceae	Ericales	CS	G
Erigenia	springtime-born	Apiaceae	Apiales	St	
Erigeron	Greek and Latin name	Asteraceae	Asterales	CS	G
Erinacea	Latin: hedgehog	Fabaceae	Fabales	Ba	G
Erinus	Greek name	Plantaginaceae	Lamiales	CS	G
Eriobotrya	woolly bunch (the inflorescences)	Rosaceae	Rosales	CS	G
Eriocephalus	woolly heads	Asteraceae	Asterales	St	G
Eriogonum	woolly nodes	Polygonaceae	Caryophyllales	St	G
Eriope	Eriopis, a mythological woman	Lamiaceae	Lamiales	Bu	
Eriophorum	wool-bearing (the fruiting heads)	Cyperaceae	Poales	CS	G
Eriophyllum	woolly leaves	Asteraceae	Asterales	St	G
Eriopidion	woolly leaves	Lamiaceae	Lamiales	Bu	
Eriopsis	Eria-like	Orchidaceae	Asparagales	St	
Eriostemon	woolly stamens	Rutaceae	Sapindales	St	G
Eritrichium	woolly hairs	Boraginaceae	Boraginales	St	G
Erlangea	University of Erlangen (now Erlangen–Nuremberg)	Asteraceae	Asterales	St	G
Erodium	heron (the long carpels or fruit)	Geraniaceae	Geraniales	CS	G
Eruca	Latin name	Brassicaceae	Brassicales	CS	G
Erycina	Erykine, an epithet of the goddess Venus	Orchidaceae	Asparagales	Bu	
Eryngium	Greek name	Apiaceae	Apiales	CS	G
Erysimum	Greek name	Brassicaceae	Brassicales	CS	G
Erythrina	red	Fabaceae	Fabales	CS	G
Erythronium	Greek name	Liliaceae	Liliales	CS	G
Erythroxylum	red wood. Previously Erythroxylon.	Erythroxylaceae	Malpighiales	St	G
Eucalyptus	well-covered (the cap on the flower buds)	Myrtaceae	Myrtales	CS	G
Eucharis	charming (the flowers)	Amaryllidaceae	Asparagales	St	G
Eucnide	good nettle	Loasaceae	Cornales	St	G
Eucomis	good hair (the bracts above the inflorescences)	Asparagaceae	Asparagales	CS	G
Eucommia	good gum	Eucommiaceae	Garryales	St	G
Eucryphia	well-hidden (by its sepals)	Cunoniaceae	Oxalidales	CS	G
Eulophia	good crests (on the lips)	Orchidaceae	Asparagales	St	G
Euodia	good fragrance	Rutaceae	Sapindales	Ba	G
Euonymus	Greek and Latin name	Celastraceae	Celastrales	CS	G
Eupatorium	Greek and Latin name	Asteraceae	Asterales	CS	G
Euphorbia	Greek and Latin name	Euphorbiaceae	Malpighiales	CS	G
Euphrasia	delight	Orobanchaceae	Lamiales	St	G
Euphrosyne	Euphrosyne, a goddess	Asteraceae	Asterales	Bu	
Euptelea	good elm	Eupteleaceae	Ranunculales	St	G
Eurya	broad	Pentaphylacaceae	Ericales	St	G
Euryale	Euryale of mythology	Nymphaeaceae	Nymphaeales	St	G
Eurybia	Eurybia, a goddess	Asteraceae	Asterales	Bu	
Euryops	large eye (the flower heads)	Asteraceae	Asterales	CS	G
Eustoma	idiom for a pretty face (the striking flowers)	Gentianaceae	Gentianales	St	G
Eustrephus	well-entwined (the climbing vines)	Asparagaceae	Asparagales	St	G
Eutaxia	modest or well-ordered	Fabaceae	Fabales	St	
Euterpe	Euterpe of mythology	Arecaceae	Arecales	St	G
Euthamia	well-crowded	Asteraceae	Asterales	Ba	
Eutrochium	well-wheeled	Asteraceae	Asterales	Ba	
Evolvulus	untwisted (the vines)	Convolvulaceae	Solanales	St	G
Exacum	Gallic and Latin name	Gentianaceae	Gentianales	St	G
Exochorda	external chord (on the ovary wall)	Rosaceae	Rosales	CS	G
Fagopyrum	beech wheat	Polygonaceae	Caryophyllales	CS	G
Fagus	Latin name	Fagaceae	Fagales	CS	G
Farfugium	Latin name	Asteraceae	Asterales	Ba	G
Fascicularia	Latin: bundled	Bromeliaceae	Poales	Ba	G
Fatsia	derived from a Japanese name	Araliaceae	Apiales	CS	G
Faucaria	gullet	Aizoaceae	Caryophyllales	St	G
Felicia	(unclear)	Asteraceae	Asterales	CS	G
Fenestraria	Latin: window (at the top of the leaves)	Aizoaceae	Caryophyllales	St	
Ferocactus	Latin: fierce + cactus	Cactaceae	Caryophyllales	CS	
Feroniella	little Feronia	Rutaceae	Sapindales	St	
Ferula	Latin name	Apiaceae	Apiales	CS	G
Festuca	Latin: straw or grass stalk	Poaceae	Poales	CS	G
Ficaria	Ficus-like	Ranunculaceae	Ranunculales	CS	G
Ficus	Latin name	Moraceae	Rosales	CS	G
Filago	Medieval Latin name	Asteraceae	Asterales	St	G
Filipendula	Latin: thread-hanging (the tubers)	Rosaceae	Rosales	CS	G
Foeniculum	Latin name	Apiaceae	Apiales	CS	G
Fokienia	Fujian, a province of China	Cupressaceae	Pinales	Ba	G
Fragaria	from Latin: fraga (strawberry)	Rosaceae	Rosales	CS	G
Frangula	Latin: brittle. Medieval Latin name.	Rhamnaceae	Rosales	Ba	G
Fraxinus	Latin name	Oleaceae	Lamiales	CS	G
Freya	Freyja, a goddess	Asteraceae	Asterales	Bu	
Fritillaria	Latin: dice box (the checkered flowers)	Liliaceae	Liliales	CS	G
Fumaria	Medieval Latin name	Papaveraceae	Ranunculales	St	G
Gaiadendron	Gaia (a goddess) + tree	Loranthaceae	Santalales	Bu	
Galactites	milky (the veins)	Asteraceae	Asterales	St	G
Galanthus	milky flowers	Amaryllidaceae	Asparagales	CS	G
Galax	milk (the flowers)	Diapensiaceae	Ericales	CS	G
Galeandra	helmet (-capped) stamens	Orchidaceae	Asparagales	St	G
Galega	derived from gala, milk; named gallica herba in Latin	Fabaceae	Fabales	CS	G
Galeopsis	Latin name	Lamiaceae	Lamiales	St	G
Galium	Greek name	Rubiaceae	Gentianales	CS	G
Gasteria	belly (the swollen flower base)	Asphodelaceae	Asparagales	St	G
Gastrochilus	belly (swollen) lip	Orchidaceae	Asparagales	St	G
Geissorhiza	tiled roots	Iridaceae	Asparagales	Ba	G
Geitonoplesium	near-neighbour	Asphodelaceae	Asparagales	St	G
Gelsemium	Italian name	Gelsemiaceae	Gentianales	CS	G
Genipa	Guyanese name	Rubiaceae	Gentianales	St	G
Genista	Latin name	Fabaceae	Fabales	CS	G
Geogenanthus	ground-birth (low-growing) flowers	Commelinaceae	Commelinales	St	G
Geonoma	colonist	Arecaceae	Arecales	St	G
Geranium	crane (the fruit). Greek and Latin name.	Geraniaceae	Geraniales	CS	G
Geum	Latin name	Rosaceae	Rosales	CS	G
Gevuina	Chilean name	Proteaceae	Proteales	St	G
Gibbaeum	Latin: humped	Aizoaceae	Caryophyllales	Ba	G
Ginkgo	Chinese and Japanese name	Ginkgoaceae	Ginkgoales	CS	G
Gladiolus	little sword (the leaves)	Iridaceae	Asparagales	CS	G
Glandora	glandular Lithodora	Boraginaceae	Boraginales	Ba	
Glaucidium	Glaucium-like	Ranunculaceae	Ranunculales	CS	G
Glaucium	greyish-blue-green (the leaves)	Papaveraceae	Ranunculales	CS	G
Glebionis	Latin: soil	Asteraceae	Asterales	Ba	
Glechoma	Greek name	Lamiaceae	Lamiales	St	G
Gliricidia	Latin: dormouse-killing (derived from a Colombian name)	Fabaceae	Fabales	St	G
Globba	Indonesian name	Zingiberaceae	Zingiberales	St	G
Globularia	little globe (the flower heads)	Plantaginaceae	Lamiales	CS	G
Gloriosa	Latin: glorious	Colchicaceae	Liliales	CS	G
Glottiphyllum	tongue leaves	Aizoaceae	Caryophyllales	St	G
Glumicalyx	glume + calyx	Scrophulariaceae	Lamiales	Ba	G
Glyceria	sweet (the seeds)	Poaceae	Poales	CS	G
Glycine	sweet	Fabaceae	Fabales	CS	G
Glycosmis	sweet scent	Rutaceae	Sapindales	St	G
Glycyrrhiza	sweet roots	Fabaceae	Fabales	CS	G
Glyptostrobus	carved (pitted) cones	Cupressaceae	Pinales	St	G
Gnaphalium	Greek and Latin name	Asteraceae	Asterales	St	G
Gnidia	Knidos	Thymelaeaceae	Malvales	St	G
Gomphocarpus	club-shaped fruit	Apocynaceae	Gentianales	Ba	G
Gompholobium	peg-like pods	Fabaceae	Fabales	St	G
Gomphrena	from a Latin name	Amaranthaceae	Caryophyllales	CS	G
Goniolimon	angled Limonium	Plumbaginaceae	Caryophyllales	Ba	G
Gossypium	Latin name, originally from Arabic	Malvaceae	Malvales	St	G
Grammatophyllum	marked leaves	Orchidaceae	Asparagales	St	G
Graptopetalum	painted petals	Crassulaceae	Saxifragales	St	G
Graptophyllum	painted leaves	Acanthaceae	Lamiales	St	G
Gratiola	satisfying	Plantaginaceae	Lamiales	St	G
Gymnadenia	naked glands (the stamens)	Orchidaceae	Asparagales	St	G
Gymnocalycium	naked (flower) buds	Cactaceae	Caryophyllales	St	G
Gymnocladus	naked branches	Fabaceae	Fabales	CS	G
Gynerium	female wool (the woolly spikelets on the female plants)	Poaceae	Poales	St	G
Gynura	female tail (the long stigmas)	Asteraceae	Asterales	CS	G
Gypsophila	gypsum-loving	Caryophyllaceae	Caryophyllales	CS	G
Habenaria	rein (the spurs and lips)	Orchidaceae	Asparagales	St	G
Habranthus	graceful flowers	Amaryllidaceae	Asparagales	St	G
Haemanthus	blood flowers	Amaryllidaceae	Asparagales	St	G
Haematoxylum	blood wood (yielding a red dye)	Fabaceae	Fabales	St	G
Hakonechloa	Mount Hakone (Japan) grass	Poaceae	Poales	Ba	G
Halimium	seaside	Cistaceae	Malvales	CS	G
Halimodendron	(salt-tolerant) seaside tree	Fabaceae	Fabales	CS	G
Hamadryas	dryads (tree nymphs)	Ranunculaceae	Ranunculales	Bu	G
Hamamelis	Greek name	Hamamelidaceae	Saxifragales	CS	G
Haplopappus	single pappus	Asteraceae	Asterales	St	G
Harpephyllum	sickle leaves	Anacardiaceae	Sapindales	St	G
Hebanthe	pubescent flower	Amaranthaceae	Caryophyllales	Bu	
Hedeoma	from a Greek name	Lamiaceae	Lamiales	St	G
Hedera	Latin name	Araliaceae	Apiales	CS	G
Hedychium	sweet snow (the scented white flowers)	Zingiberaceae	Zingiberales	CS	G
Hedyotis	sweet ear	Rubiaceae	Gentianales	St	G
Hedysarum	Greek name	Fabaceae	Fabales	CS	G
Hedyscepe	sweet covering (the flowers)	Arecaceae	Arecales	St	G
Helenium	Greek and Latin name	Asteraceae	Asterales	CS	G
Heliamphora	marsh jar (a pitcher plant)	Sarraceniaceae	Ericales	St	G
Helianthella	little Helianthus	Asteraceae	Asterales	St	G
Helianthemum	sunny flowers (the habitat)	Cistaceae	Malvales	CS	G
Helianthus	sunflowers (the appearance)	Asteraceae	Asterales	CS	G
Helichrysum	sun of gold (the flowers)	Asteraceae	Asterales	CS	G
Helicodiceros	two spiral horns (at the base of the leaves)	Araceae	Alismatales	St	G
Heliconia	Latin name, from Mount Helicon	Heliconiaceae	Zingiberales	St	G
Helictotrichon	twisted hair	Poaceae	Poales	Ba	G
Heliophila	sun-loving	Brassicaceae	Brassicales	St	G
Heliopsis	sun-like (the flowers)	Asteraceae	Asterales	CS	G
Heliotropium	sun-facing	Boraginaceae	Boraginales	CS	G
Helleborus	Greek name	Ranunculaceae	Ranunculales	CS	G
Hellenocarum	"Greek" + Carum	Apiaceae	Apiales	Bu	
Helonias	marsh	Melanthiaceae	Liliales	St	G
Heloniopsis	Helonias-like	Melanthiaceae	Liliales	St	G
Hemerocallis	one-day beauty (the ephemeral flowers). Greek and Latin name.	Asphodelaceae	Asparagales	CS	G
Hemiandra	half male-part (the reduced stamens)	Lamiaceae	Lamiales	St	G
Hemigraphis	half-brush (the hairy filaments)	Acanthaceae	Lamiales	St	G
Hemiptelea	half elm (the half-winged fruit)	Ulmaceae	Rosales	St	G
Hepatica	liver (the leaves)	Ranunculaceae	Ranunculales	St	G
Heptacodium	seven-headed (poppy)	Caprifoliaceae	Dipsacales	Ba	G
Heracleum	Heracles of mythology	Apiaceae	Apiales	CS	G
Herniaria	(a remedy for) hernia	Caryophyllaceae	Caryophyllales	St	G
Herpolirion	creeping lily	Asphodelaceae	Asparagales	Ba	G
Hesperaloe	western Aloe	Asparagaceae	Asparagales	CS	G
Hesperantha	evening flowers	Iridaceae	Asparagales	CS	G
Hesperis	evening (when the flower scent is strongest)	Brassicaceae	Brassicales	CS	G
Hesperocallis	western beauty	Asparagaceae	Asparagales	Ba	G
Heteranthera	diverse anthers (one is larger than the others)	Pontederiaceae	Commelinales	St	G
Heterocentron	diverse spurs	Melastomataceae	Myrtales	St	G
Heteromeles	diverse apples	Rosaceae	Rosales	St	G
Heterospathe	diverse spathes	Arecaceae	Arecales	St	G
Heterotheca	different (seed) boxes	Asteraceae	Asterales	Ba	G
Hevea	Guyanan name	Euphorbiaceae	Malpighiales	St	G
Hibiscus	Greek and Latin name	Malvaceae	Malvales	CS	G
Hieracium	Greek name	Asteraceae	Asterales	St	G
Hierochloe	sacred grass (for its use in ceremonies)	Poaceae	Poales	CS	G
Himalayacalamus	Himalayan reed	Poaceae	Poales	Ba	G
Hippeastrum	horse or rider star (the flowers)	Amaryllidaceae	Asparagales	CS	G
Hippobroma	horse-rage (it is poisonous)	Campanulaceae	Asterales	St	G
Hippocrepis	horse shoe (the seed pods)	Fabaceae	Fabales	CS	G
Hippophae	Greek name	Elaeagnaceae	Rosales	CS	G
Hippuris	horse tail	Plantaginaceae	Lamiales	Ba	G
Hoheria	Maori name	Malvaceae	Malvales	CS	G
Holcus	Greek and Latin name	Poaceae	Poales	CS	G
Holodiscus	undivided disk (the flowers)	Rosaceae	Rosales	CS	G
Homalanthus	flat flowers	Euphorbiaceae	Malpighiales	St	G
Homalomena	flat moon; mistranslation of a Malayan name	Araceae	Alismatales	St	
Hordeum	Latin name	Poaceae	Poales	CS	G
Horminum	Greek and Latin name	Lamiaceae	Lamiales	CS	G
Howea	Lord Howe Island (the habitat)	Arecaceae	Arecales	St	G
Humulus	German name	Cannabaceae	Rosales	CS	G
Hura	South American name	Euphorbiaceae	Malpighiales	St	G
Hyacinthella	Hyacinth, a mythological hero	Asparagaceae	Asparagales	Bu	G
Hyacinthoides	Hyacinthus-like	Asparagaceae	Asparagales	Bu	G
Hyacinthus	Hyacinth of mythology. Greek and Latin name.	Asparagaceae	Asparagales	CS	G
Hydrangea	water container (the cup-shaped capsules)	Hydrangeaceae	Cornales	CS	G
Hydrastis	water, by analogy with Hydrophyllum	Ranunculaceae	Ranunculales	St	G
Hydriastele	water column (tree)	Arecaceae	Arecales	St	G
Hydrilla	little water serpent, possibly	Hydrocharitaceae	Alismatales	St	G
Hydrocharis	water grace	Hydrocharitaceae	Alismatales	St	G
Hydrocleys	water key	Alismataceae	Alismatales	CS	G
Hydrocotyle	water + shallow cup (the leaves)	Araliaceae	Apiales	St	G
Hydrolea	water olive (the leaves)	Hydroleaceae	Solanales	St	G
Hydrophyllum	watery leaves	Restionaceae	Poales	St	G
Hygrophila	moisture-loving	Acanthaceae	Lamiales	Ba	G
Hylocereus	grove cactus	Cactaceae	Caryophyllales	St	G
Hylomecon	grove poppy	Papaveraceae	Ranunculales	St	G
Hylotelephium	forest Telephium	Crassulaceae	Saxifragales	Ba	
Hymenaea	Hymen of mythology	Fabaceae	Fabales	St	G
Hymenocallis	membrane beauty (on the stamens)	Amaryllidaceae	Asparagales	St	G
Hymenosporum	membranous seeds	Pittosporaceae	Apiales	St	G
Hymenoxys	membrane points	Asteraceae	Asterales	Ba	G
Hyophorbe	pig food	Arecaceae	Arecales	St	G
Hyoscyamus	pig (poor) bean	Solanaceae	Solanales	St	G
Hypericum	Greek and Latin name	Clusiaceae	Malpighiales	CS	G
Hyphaene	meshing (the fruit fibres)	Arecaceae	Arecales	St	G
Hypocalymma	below a veil (of sepals)	Myrtaceae	Myrtales	St	G
Hypochaeris	Greek and Latin name. Previously Hypochoeris.	Asteraceae	Asterales	St	G
Hypoestes	undercover	Acanthaceae	Lamiales	Ba	G
Hypoxis	Greek name	Hypoxidaceae	Asparagales	St	G
Hyssopus	Greek and Latin name	Lamiaceae	Lamiales	CS	G
Iberis	Greek name	Brassicaceae	Brassicales	CS	G
Ibicella	little ibex	Martyniaceae	Lamiales	St	G
Ichtyoselmis	fish + fishing line (the flowers)	Papaveraceae	Ranunculales	Ba	
Ilex	Latin name	Aquifoliaceae	Aquifoliales	CS	G
Illicium	Latin: enticement	Schisandraceae	Austrobaileyales	CS	G
Impatiens	Latin: impatient (the forcefully ejected fruit)	Balsaminaceae	Ericales	CS	G
Indigofera	indigo-bearing	Fabaceae	Fabales	CS	G
Indocalamus	Latin: East Indies + Greek: reed	Poaceae	Poales	Ba	G
Inga	Tupi–Guarani name	Fabaceae	Fabales	St	G
Inula	Latin name	Asteraceae	Asterales	CS	G
Io	Io, a mythological princess	Asteraceae	Asterales	Bu	
Iochroma	violet colour	Solanaceae	Solanales	St	G
Iogeton	Io, a mythological princess, or rusty, or violet	Asteraceae	Asterales	Bu	
Ionopsidium	violet-like	Brassicaceae	Brassicales	St	G
Ionopsis	Io, a mythological princess, or violet-appearing	Orchidaceae	Asparagales	Bu	G
Ipheion	derived from a Greek name	Amaryllidaceae	Asparagales	St	G
Iphigenia	Iphigenia, a mythological princess	Colchicaceae	Liliales	Bu	G
Ipomoea	worm-like (the vines)	Convolvulaceae	Solanales	CS	G
Ipomopsis	Ipomoea-like	Polemoniaceae	Ericales	Ba	G
Irenepharsus	Eirene (a goddess) + division	Brassicaceae	Brassicales	Bu	
Iresine	woolly branches, possibly	Amaranthaceae	Caryophyllales	CS	G
Iris	rainbow (the flowers)	Iridaceae	Asparagales	CS	G
Isatis	Greek name	Brassicaceae	Brassicales	CS	G
Ismene	Ismene, a mythological princess	Amaryllidaceae	Asparagales	Bu	G
Isolepis	equal scales	Cyperaceae	Poales	Ba	G
Isopogon	evenly bearded (the fruit)	Proteaceae	Proteales	St	G
Isopyrum	Greek and Latin name	Ranunculaceae	Ranunculales	St	G
Isotoma	equal sections (in the flowers)	Campanulaceae	Asterales	St	G
Itea	Greek name	Iteaceae	Saxifragales	CS	G
Ixia	Greek and Latin name	Iridaceae	Asparagales	St	G
Ixiolirion	Ixia + lily	Ixioliriaceae	Asparagales	St	G
Ixora	derived from Sanskrit	Rubiaceae	Gentianales	St	G
Jaborosa	Arabic name	Solanaceae	Solanales	Ba	G
Jacaranda	Brazilian name	Bignoniaceae	Lamiales	St	G
Jacmaia	anagram of Jamaica	Asteraceae	Asterales	Bu	G
Janusia	Janus, a god	Malpighiaceae	Malpighiales	Bu	
Jasione	Greek name	Campanulaceae	Asterales	St	G
Jasminum	Persian name	Oleaceae	Lamiales	CS	G
Jatropha	doctor food (it is a purgative)	Euphorbiaceae	Malpighiales	St	G
Juania	Juan Fernández Islands in the Valparaíso Region of Chile	Arecaceae	Arecales	Bu	G
Juglans	Latin name	Juglandaceae	Fagales	CS	G
Juncus	binding. Latin name.	Juncaceae	Poales	CS	G
Juniperus	Latin name	Cupressaceae	Pinales	CS	G
Kadsura	Japanese name	Schisandraceae	Austrobaileyales	St	G
Kalanchoe	derived from a Chinese name	Crassulaceae	Saxifragales	CS	G
Kalopanax	attractive Panax	Araliaceae	Apiales	CS	G
Kigelia	Mozambique name	Bignoniaceae	Lamiales	St	G
Kirengeshoma	Japanese name	Hydrangeaceae	Cornales	CS	G

== See also ==
- Glossary of botanical terms
- List of Greek and Latin roots in English
- List of Latin and Greek words commonly used in systematic names
- List of plant genera named after people: A–C, D–J, K–P, Q–Z
- List of plant family names with etymologies
