= Poppy =

Flowering plant

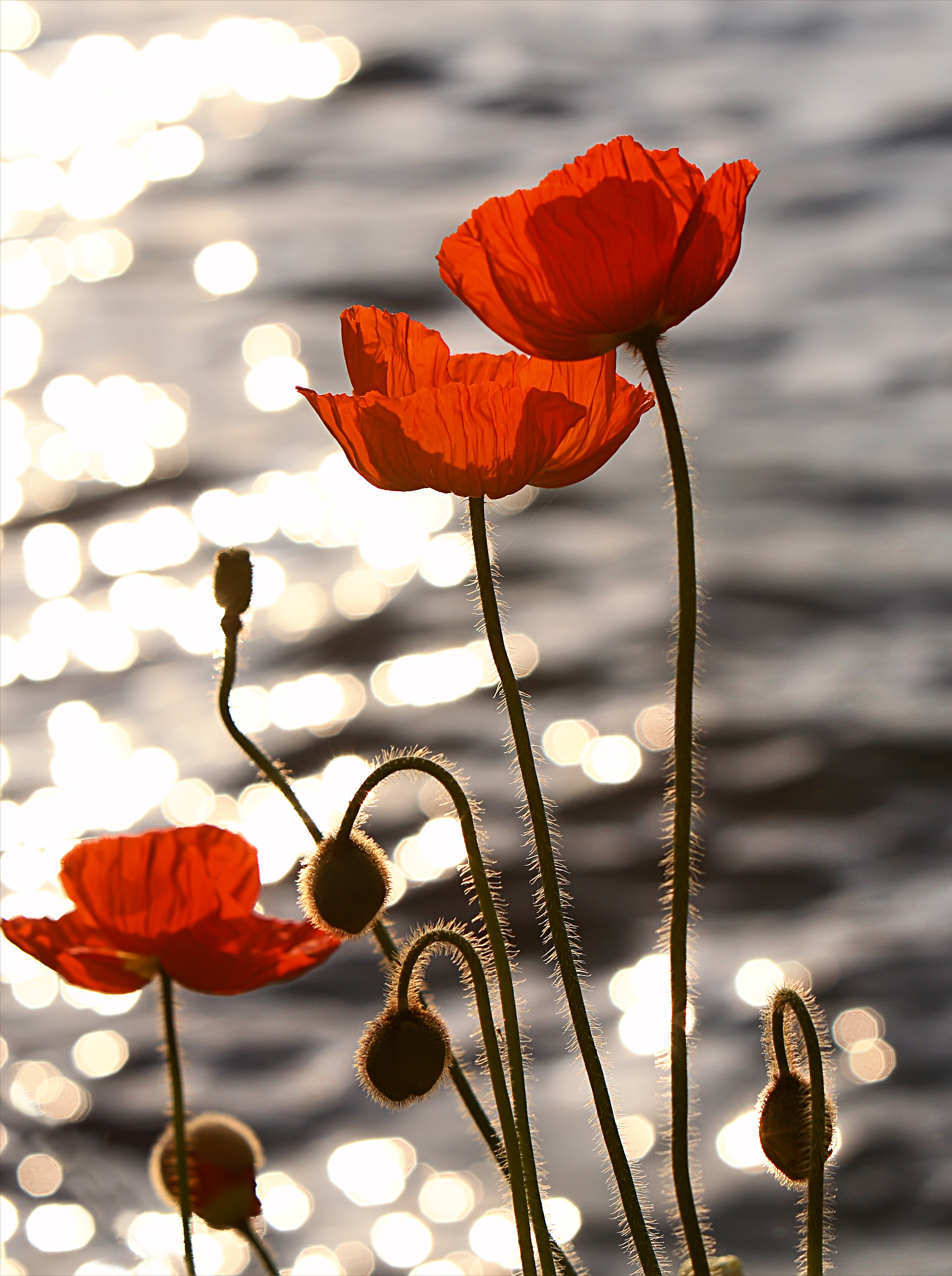
Poppies on Lake Geneva, Montreux

A poppy is a flowering plant in the subfamily Papaveroideae of the family Papaveraceae. Poppies are herbaceous plants, often grown for their colourful flowers. One species of poppy, Papaver somniferum, is the source of the narcotic drug mixture opium, which contains powerful medicinal alkaloids such as morphine and has been used since ancient times as an analgesic and narcotic medicinal and recreational drug. It also produces edible seeds. Following the trench warfare in the poppy fields of Flanders, Belgium, during World War I, poppies, specifically the red poppy, have become a symbol of remembrance of soldiers who have died during wartime, especially in the UK, Canada, Australia, Africa and other Commonwealth realms.

== Description ==
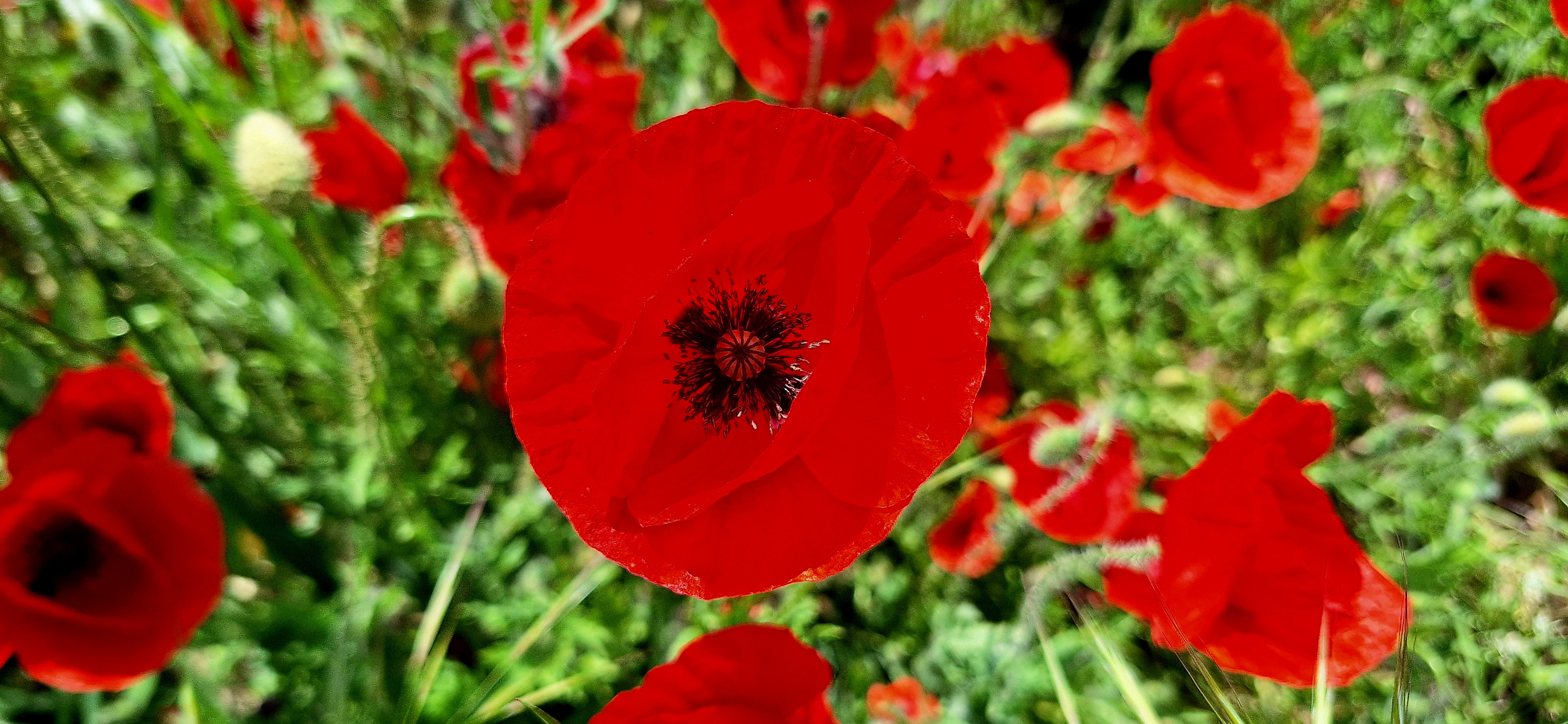
A close-up of a red-flowered poppy

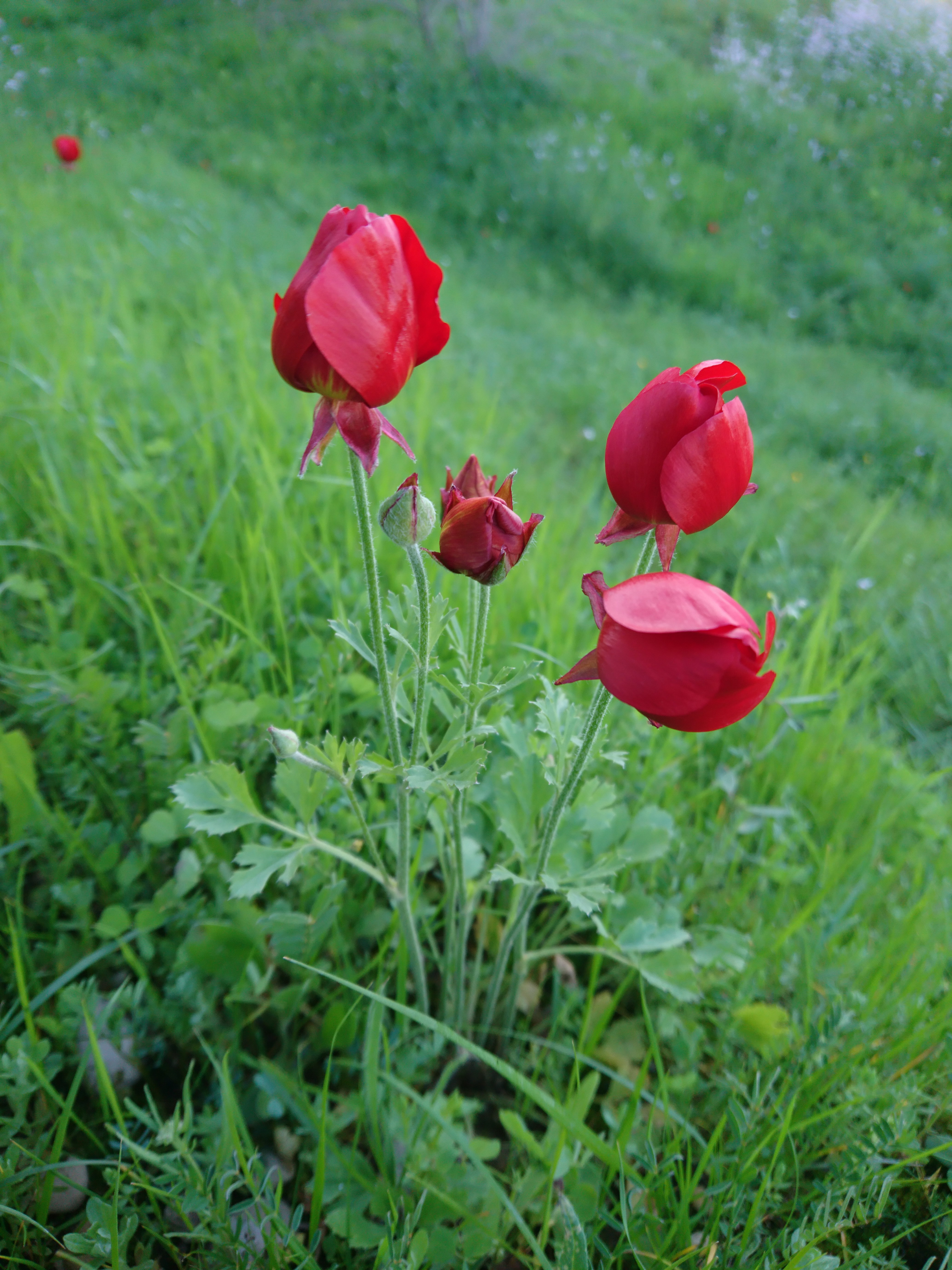
Wild poppy in Behbahan

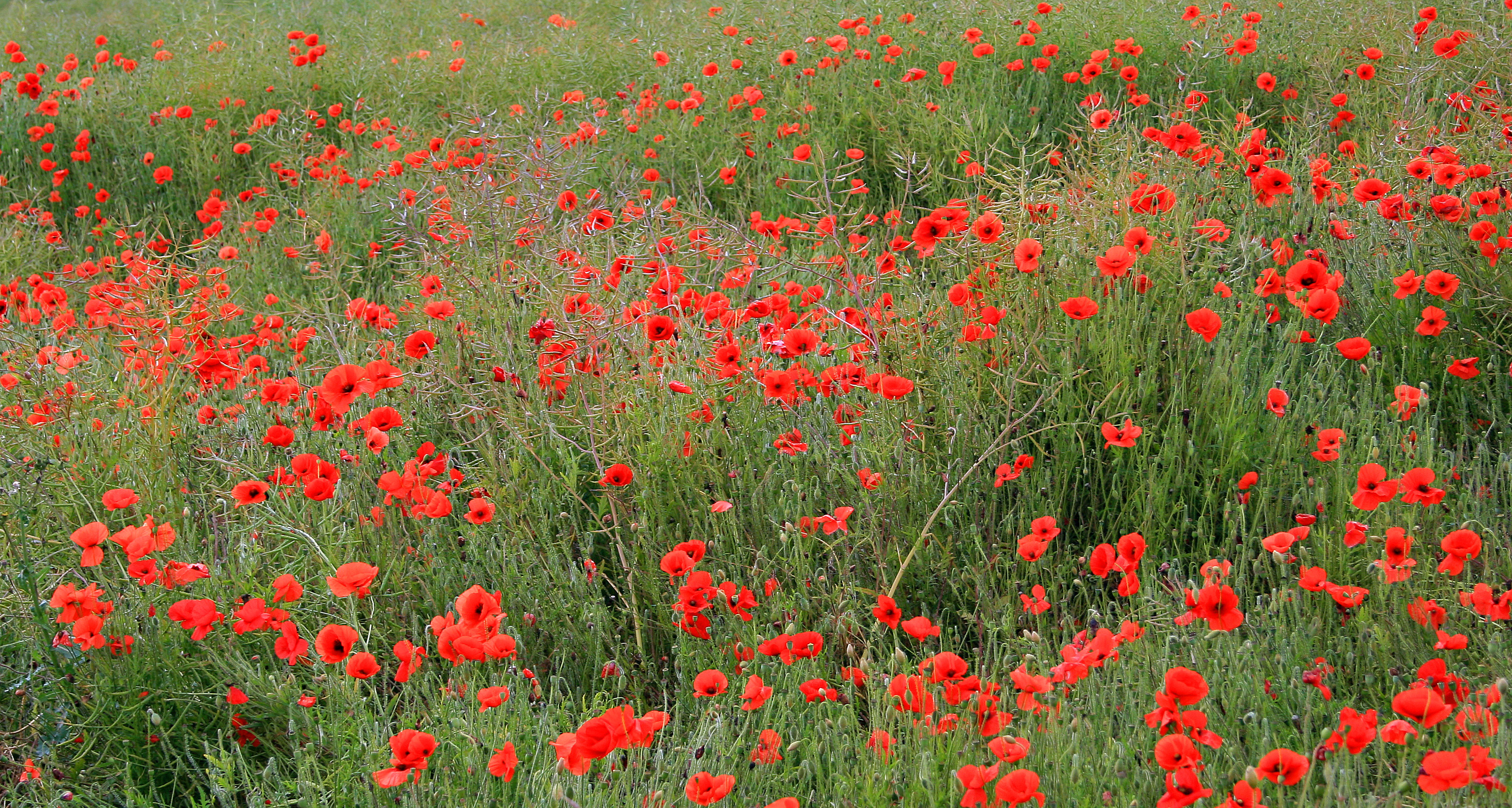
Wild poppy in Harrietsham, Kent, England

Poppies are herbaceous annual, biennial or short-lived perennial plants. Some species are monocarpic, dying after flowering.

Poppies can be over 1 metre (3.3 ft) tall with flowers up to 15 centimetres (5.9 in) across. Flowers of species (not cultivars) have 4 or 6 petals, many stamens forming a conspicuous whorl in the center of the flower and an ovary composed of 2 or more fused carpels. The petals are showy, may be of almost any colour and may have markings. The petals are crumpled in the bud and as blooming finishes, the petals often lie flat before falling away.

In the temperate zones, poppies bloom from spring into early summer. Most species secrete latex when injured. Bees use poppies as a pollen source. The pollen of the oriental poppy, Papaver orientale, is dark blue, that of the field or corn poppy (Papaver rhoeas) is grey to dark green. The opium poppy, Papaver somniferum, grows wild in Southeast Europe and Southeast Asia. It is believed that it originated in the Mediterranean region.

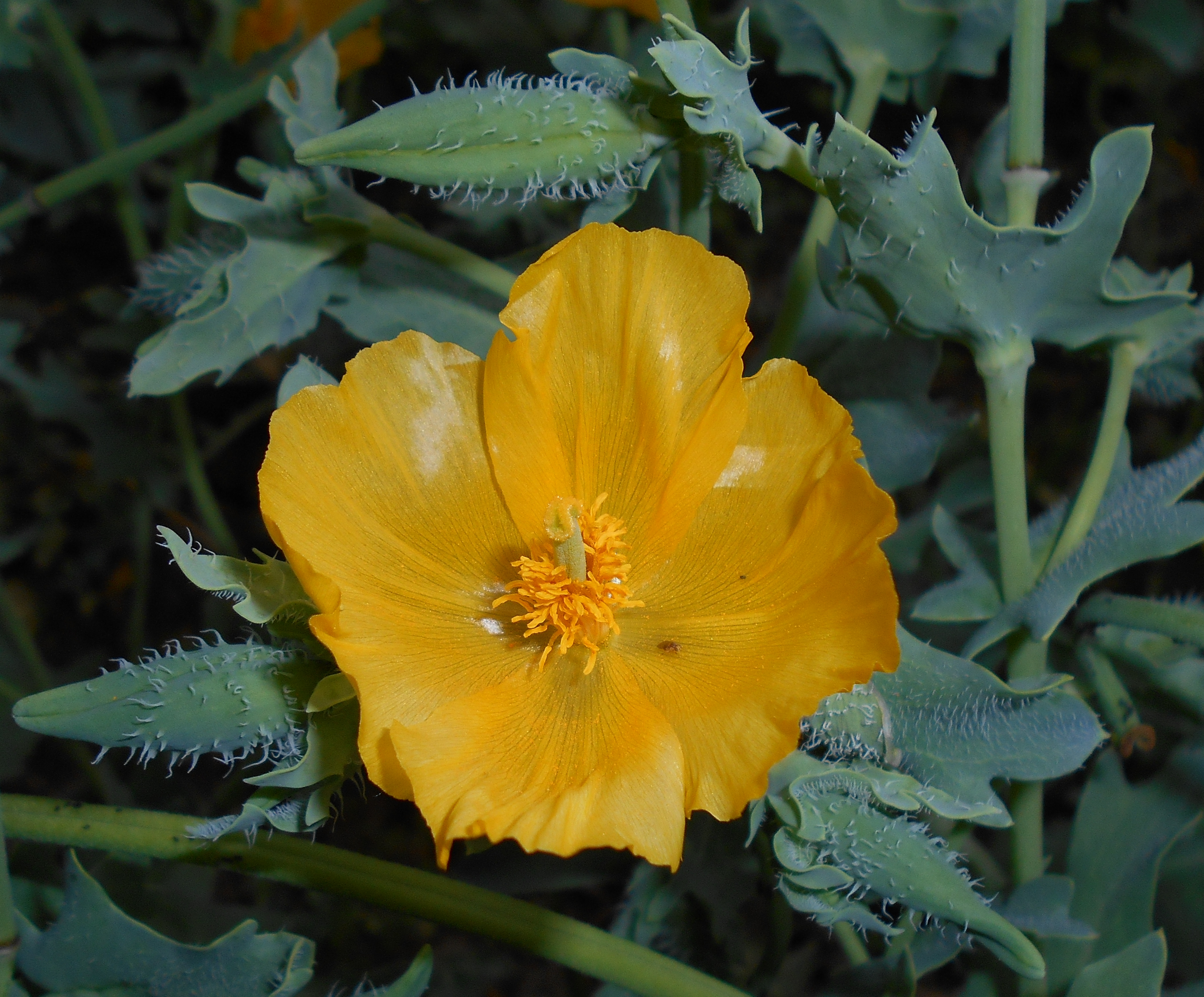
A flowering glaucium flavum

Poppies belong to the subfamily Papaveroideae of the family Papaveraceae, which includes the following genera:

- Papaver – Papaver rhoeas, Papaver somniferum, Papaver orientale, Papaver nudicaule, Papaver cambricum
- Eschscholzia – Eschscholzia californica
- Meconopsis – Meconopsis napaulensis
- Glaucium - the horned poppies including Glaucium flavum and Glaucium corniculatum
- Stylophorum – celandine poppy
- Argemone – prickly poppy
- Romneya – matilija poppy and relatives
- Canbya – pygmy poppy
- Stylomecon – wind poppy
- Arctomecon – desert bearpaw poppy
- Hunnemannia – tulip poppy
- Dendromecon – tree poppy

== Uses and cultivation ==
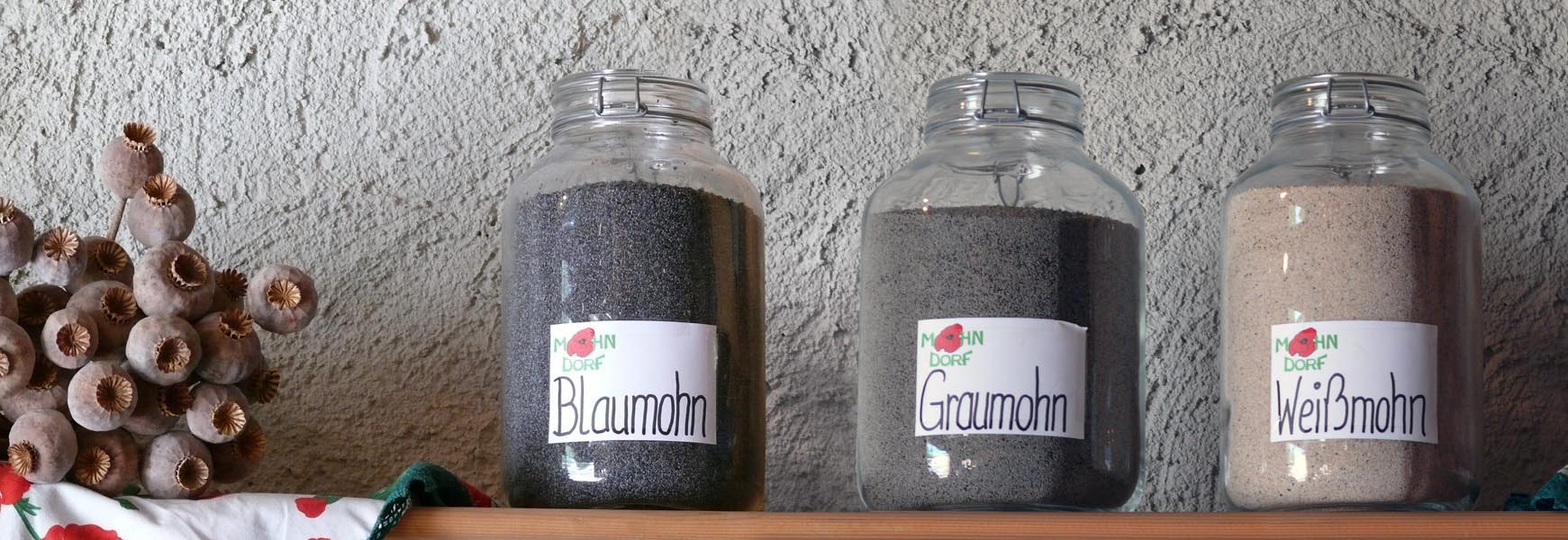
Poppy stems next to jars of blue, gray, and white poppy seeds used for pastries

The flowers of most poppy species are attractive and are widely cultivated as annual or perennial ornamental plants. This has resulted in a number of commercially important cultivars, such as the Shirley poppy, a cultivar of Papaver rhoeas and semi-double or double (flore plena) forms of the opium poppy Papaver somniferum and oriental poppy (Papaver orientale). Poppies of several other genera are also cultivated in gardens.

Poppy seeds are rich in oil, carbohydrates, calcium and protein and are regularly used to fill various pastries in Central and Eastern Europe. Poppy oil is often used as cooking oil, salad dressing oil, or in products such as margarine. Poppy oil can also be added to spices for cakes or breads. Poppy products are also used in different paints, varnishes, and some cosmetics.

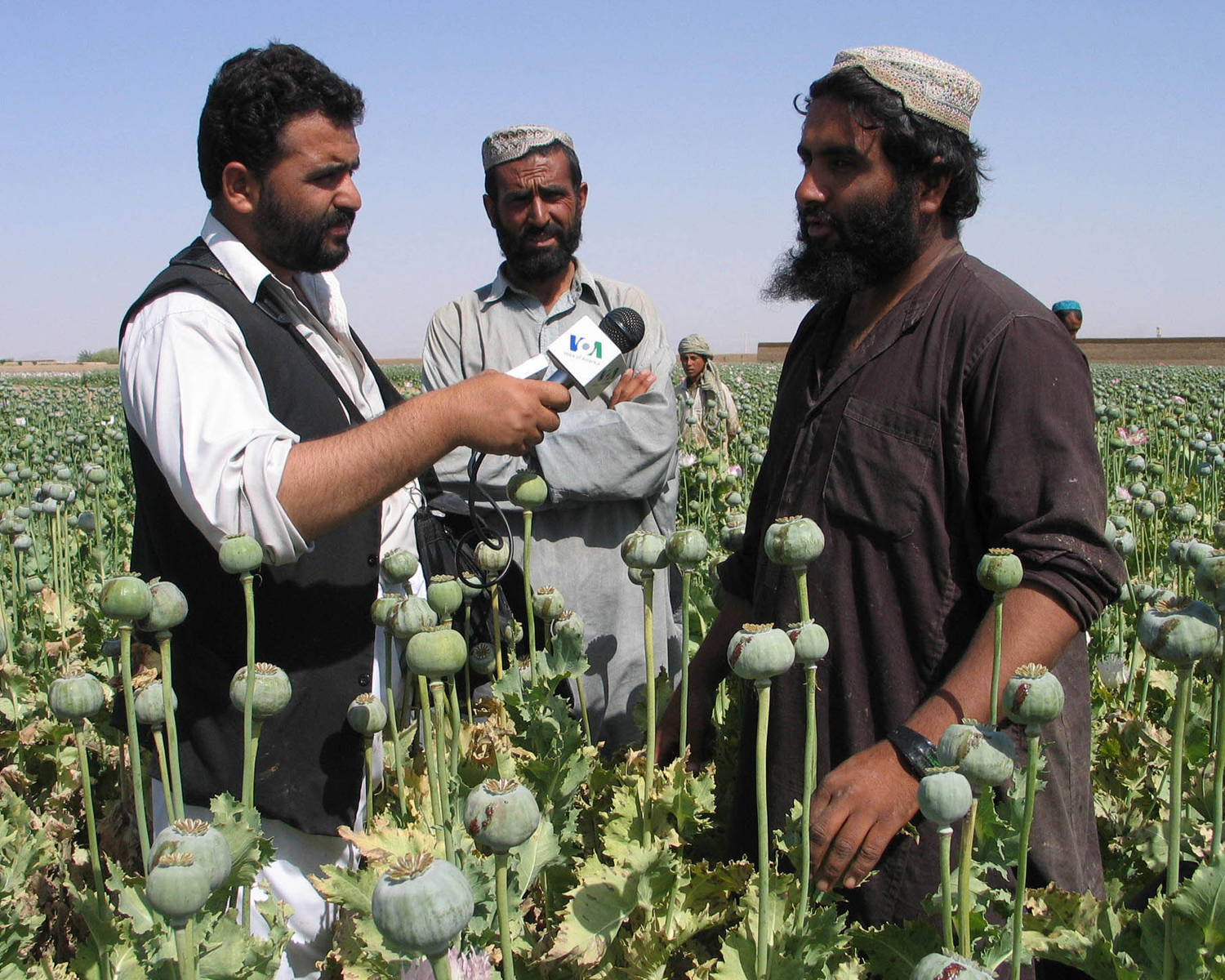
Poppy cultivators being interviewed in a poppy field

A few species have other uses, principally as sources of drugs and foods. The opium poppy is widely cultivated and its worldwide production is monitored by international agencies. It is used for production of dried latex and opium, the principal precursor of narcotic and analgesic opiates such as morphine, heroin, and codeine.

=== Traditional medicine ===
Raw opium poppy seeds can sometimes contain extremely small quantities of opiate alkaloids such as morphine and codeine. Poppy seeds and fixed oils can also be nonnarcotic because when they are harvested about twenty days after the flower has opened, the morphine is no longer present. Poppy cultivation is strictly regulated in most parts of the world, with exceptions, such as India where opium gum, which also contains the analgesic thebaine, is legally produced.

== History ==
Papaver somniferum was domesticated by the indigenous people of Western and Central Europe between 6000 and 3500 BC. However, it is believed that its origins may come from the Sumerian people, where the first use of opium was recognized. Poppies and opium made their way around the world along the silk road. Juglets resembling poppy seed pods have been discovered with trace amounts of opium and the flower appeared in jewelry and on art pieces in Ancient Egypt, dated 1550–1292 BC.

The eradication of poppy cultivation came about in the early 1900s through international conferences due to safety concerns associated with the production of opium. In the 1970s the American war on drugs targeted Turkish production of the plant, leading to a more negative popular opinion of the U.S.

== In culture ==
The feminine given name "Poppy" is taken from the name of the flower.

A poppy flower is depicted on the reverse of the Macedonian 500-denar banknote, issued in 1996 and 2003. The poppy is also part of the coat of arms of North Macedonia.

Canada has issued special quarters (25-cent coins) with a red poppy on the reverse in 2004, 2008, 2010, and 2015. The 2004 Canadian "poppy" quarter was the world's first coloured circulation coin.

== Symbolism ==
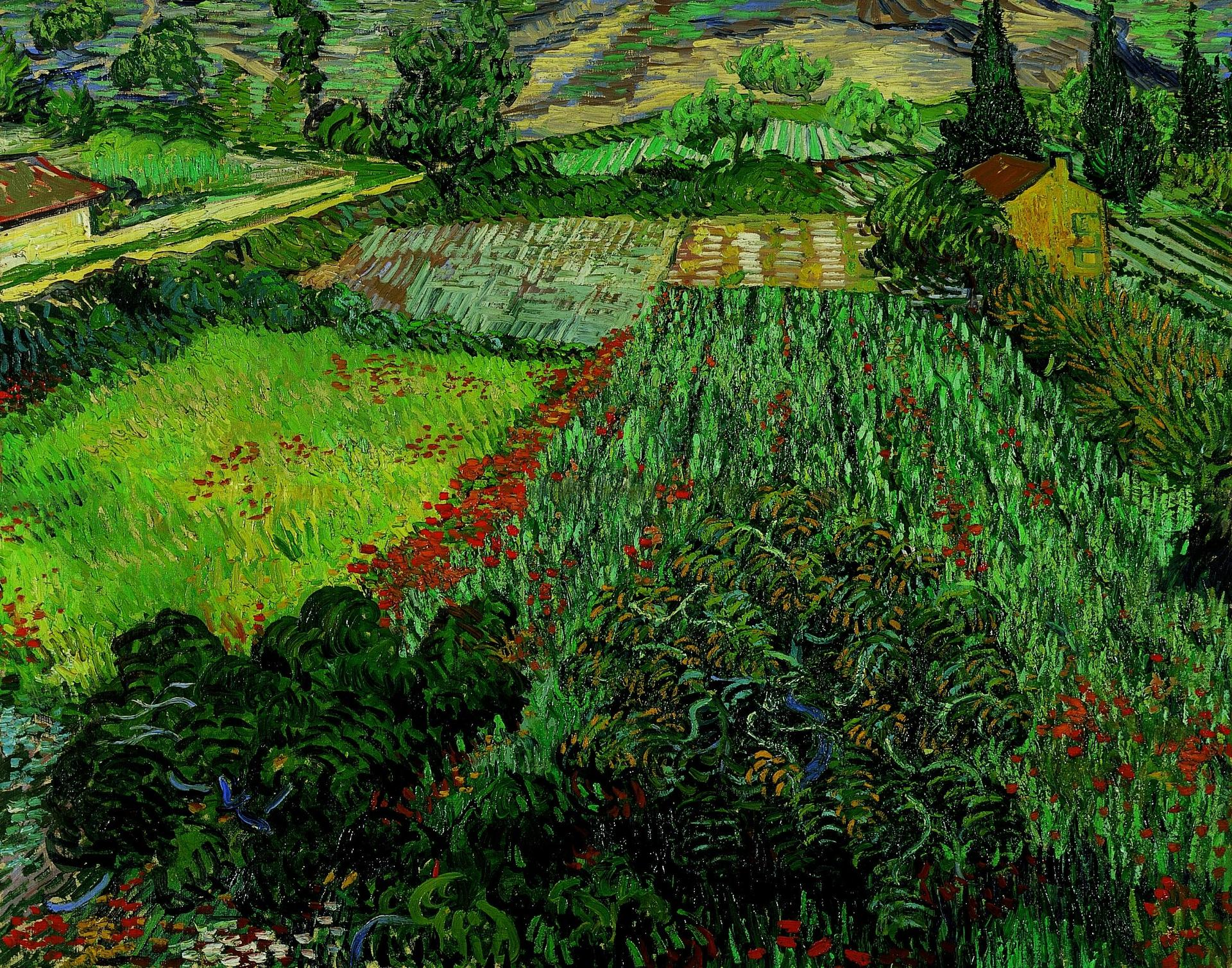
Field with Poppies, 1889, by Vincent van Gogh

Poppies have long been used as a symbol of sleep, peace, and death: Sleep because the opium extracted from them is a sedative, and death because of the common blood-red colour of the red poppy in particular. In Greek and Roman myths, poppies were used as offerings to the dead. Poppies used as emblems on tombstones symbolize eternal sleep. This symbolism was evoked in L. Frank Baum's 1900 children's novel The Wonderful Wizard of Oz, in which a magical poppy field threatened to make the protagonists sleep forever. A second interpretation of poppies in Classical mythology is that the bright scarlet colour signifies a promise of resurrection after death.

Red-flowered poppy is unofficially considered the national flower of the Albanians in Albania, Kosovo and elsewhere. This is due to its red and black colours, the same as the colours of the flag of Albania. Red poppies are also the national flower of Poland. The California poppy, Eschscholzia californica, is the state flower of California.

The powerful symbolism of Papaver rhoeas has been borrowed by various advocacy campaigns, such as the White Poppy and Simon Topping's black poppy.

=== Wartime remembrance ===
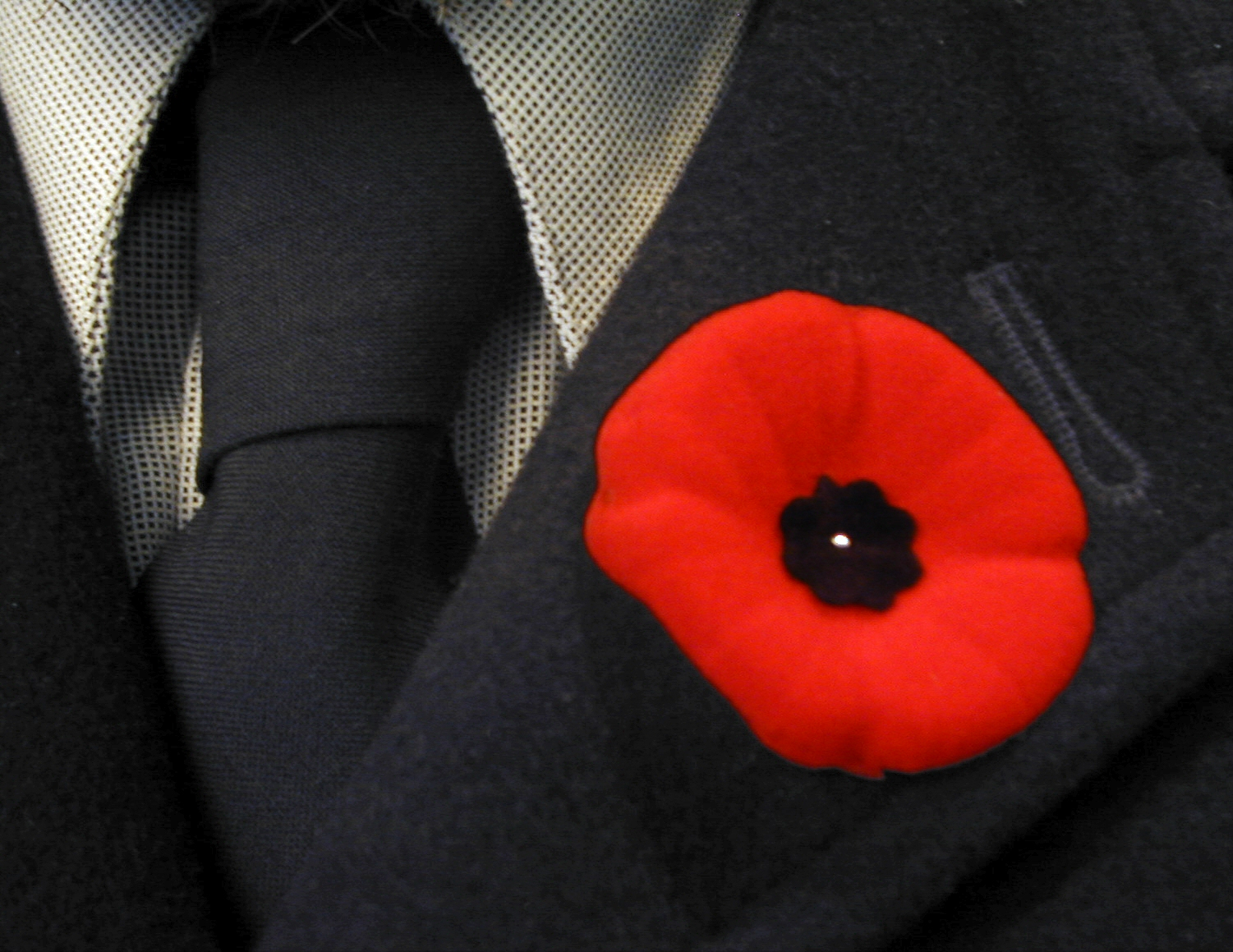
A Canadian remembrance poppy worn on the lapel

The poppy of wartime remembrance is Papaver rhoeas, the red-flowered corn poppy. This poppy is a common plant of disturbed ground in Europe and is found in many locations, including Flanders, which is the setting of the famous poem "In Flanders Fields" by the Canadian surgeon and soldier John McCrae. In Canada, the United Kingdom, Australia, South Africa and New Zealand, artificial poppies (plastic in Canada, paper in the UK, Australia, South Africa, Malta and New Zealand) are worn to commemorate those who died in war.

This form of commemoration is associated with Remembrance Day, which falls on 11 November. In Canada, Australia and the UK, poppies are often worn from the beginning of November through to the 11th, or Remembrance Sunday, if that falls on a later date. In New Zealand and Australia, soldiers are also commemorated on ANZAC day (25 April), although the poppy is still commonly worn around Remembrance Day. Wearing of poppies has been a custom since 1924 in the United States. Moina Michael of Georgia is credited as the founder of the Memorial Poppy in the United States.

The Veterans of Foreign Wars provides financial aid to its members in need and their families, partly through the selling of artificial poppies known by the registered trademark "Buddy Poppy" since 1924. Disabled veterans have assembled the poppies from the beginning of the campaign in 1923. The VFW Buddy Poppy program has raised enormous capital to support the welfare of veterans and their families.

The original poppy poster was painted by Howard Chandler Christy in 1926. Many other official posters appeared in subsequent years. Their purpose was to advertise and promote sales.

== See also ==
- List of poppy seed pastries and dishes
- Poppy goddess
