= Meconopsis lancifolia =

Scientific classification
- Kingdom: Plantae
- Clade: Embryophytes
- Clade: Tracheophytes
- Clade: Spermatophytes
- Clade: Angiosperms
- Clade: Eudicots
- Order: Ranunculales
- Family: Papaveraceae
- Genus: Meconopsis
- Species: M. lancifolia

Binomial name
- Meconopsis lancifolia (Franch.) Franch. ex Prain

Species of flowering plant in the poppy family

Meconopsis lancifolia is a plant species in the genus Meconopsis, in the family Papaveraceae. M. lancifolia is monocarpic, meaning that it flowers only once before dying.

== Description ==
Height: Though often only 8–20 cm (3.1–7.9 in) high at maturity, some plants may reach 35 cm (14 in) while flowering, and up to 42 cm (17 in) tall while fruiting.

Stems: Erect stem 3.7–25 cm long, 5–13 mm in diameter near the base. Ascending to patent-reflexed, tawny-coloured, soft bristles typically cover the stems, sometimes densely, though occasionally stems may be more or less glabrous.

Leaves: Entire to slightly sinuate or pinnately lobed leaves are borne in a basal rosette, are green or greyish-green above and are a paler, somewhat glaucous colour beneath, and measure between 2–16- 25 cm in length, and 0.5–2.2 cm in width, tapering gradually at the base. Leaves are sparsely bristly or have a variable number of bristles; bristles are not dark at the base. Lamina are elliptic-lanceolate to elliptic-oblanceolate, narrow-oblanceolate, or more rarely linear-lanceolate. Petioles are 1.5–9 cm in length.

Flowers: 2.6–8.2 cm across, with 4– 8– 11 satiny deep-blue to violet, to indigo-purple, more rarely pinkish, or very rarely light blue petals. Petals measure 13–32 mm x 10–32 mm. Flowers June–early August.

Flowers are typically significantly darker than those of Meconopsis grandis or Meconopsis horridula.

Fruit: oblong-ellipsoid to subcylindric green capsules with purple ribs ripening to brown.

== Cultivation ==
Meconopsis lancifolia does not appear to have ever been in cultivation, or is rare in cultivation despite substantial efforts by Forrest. Taylor considered that the generally weak characteristics of the bulbous root implied that it was a difficult plant. However, as it is so widespread, it is genetically quite variable, and so perhaps some forms are more adaptable than others. The standard well-fed, winter dry, summer wet may require some modification for success, with less emphasis on the summer wet.

== Habitat ==
In the wild, it is particularly associated with limestone habitats, including stony alpine meadows, rocky slopes, screes, moraines, stony and rocky pastures, open low moorland scrub, and alpine moorland. Prefers less sunny exposures.

== Distribution ==
Widespread across China, specifically in western China, from southwest Gansu to northwest Yunnan, east and southeast Tibet, western Sichuan; the Cangshan, Yulongxueshan, and the mountains of the Mekong-Salween and Mekong-Yangtze divides.

Also native to north Myanmar.

== Etymology ==
Meconopsis is derived from the Greek for 'poppy-like' (μήκων mḗkōn, 'poppy'; ὄψις ópsis, 'aspect'), while lancifolia is from the Latin for 'with sharply pointed leaves'.
