= Cathcartia =

Scientific classification
- Kingdom: Plantae
- Clade: Embryophytes
- Clade: Tracheophytes
- Clade: Spermatophytes
- Clade: Angiosperms
- Clade: Eudicots
- Order: Ranunculales
- Family: Papaveraceae
- Subfamily: Papaveroideae
- Tribe: Papavereae
- Genus: Cathcartia; Hook.f.

Species
- See text

Synonyms
- Cumminsia King ex Prain

Genus of flowering plants

Cathcartia is a small genus of flowering plants in the family Papaveraceae, native to China, Nepal, the eastern Himalayas, and northern Myanmar. Chloroplast DNA evidence supports a split of Cathcartia from the blue poppy genus Meconopsis in an effort to resolve longstanding taxonomic difficulties in the Himalayan poppies.

== Species ==
The following species are accepted:

- Cathcartia chelidoniifolia (Bureau & Franch.) Grey-Wilson
- Cathcartia oliveriana (Franch. ex Prain) Grey-Wilson
- Cathcartia smithiana Hand.-Mazz.
- Cathcartia villosa Hook.f.
