= Woodland poppy =

Woodland poppy may refer to:

- Stylophorum diphyllum, an eastern North-American species
- Meconopsis villosa, a Himalayan species
