= Meconopsis bhutanica =

Conservation status
- Critically Endangered (IUCN 3.1)

Scientific classification
- Kingdom: Plantae
- Clade: Embryophytes
- Clade: Tracheophytes
- Clade: Spermatophytes
- Clade: Angiosperms
- Clade: Eudicots
- Order: Ranunculales
- Family: Papaveraceae
- Genus: Meconopsis
- Species: M. bhutanica

Binomial name
- Meconopsis bhutanica Tosh.Yoshida & Grey-Wilson

Species of flowering plant in the poppy family

Meconopsis bhutanica is a Himalayan blue poppy species endemic to Bhutan.
