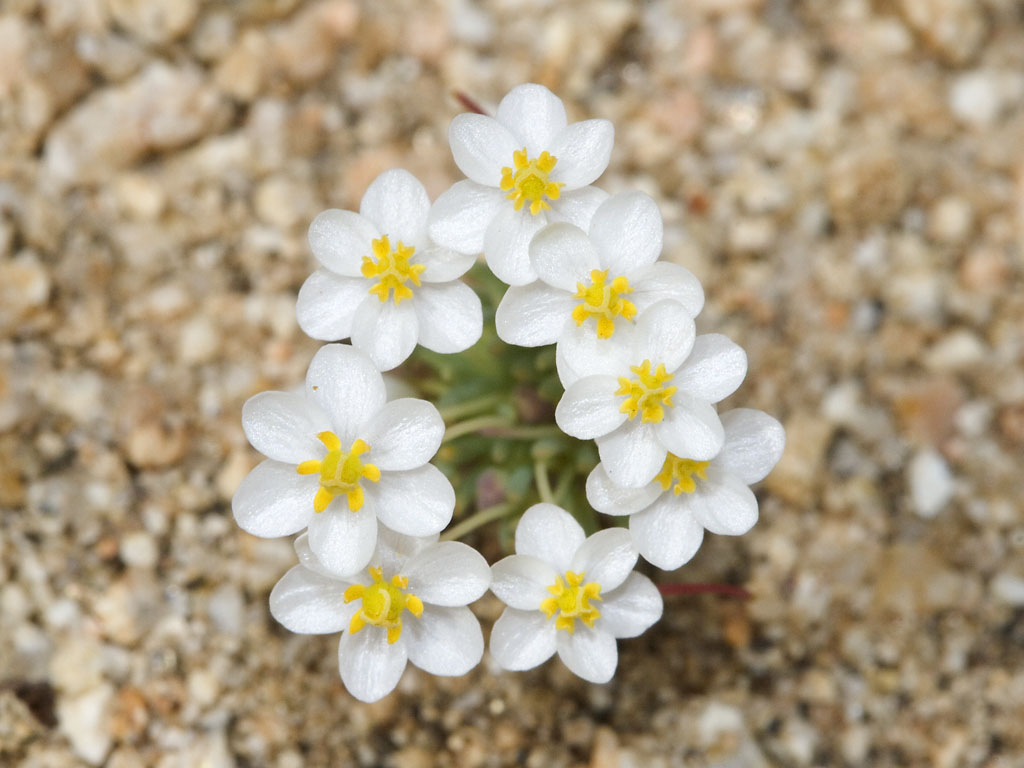

Conservation status
- Vulnerable (NatureServe)

Scientific classification
- Kingdom: Plantae
- Clade: Tracheophytes
- Clade: Angiosperms
- Clade: Eudicots
- Order: Ranunculales
- Family: Papaveraceae
- Genus: Canbya
- Species: C. candida

Binomial name
- Canbya candida Parry ex A.Gray

= Canbya candida =

Species of flowering plant

Canbya candida (common names: pygmy poppy, white pygmy poppy) is a tiny, white flowered annual plant in the genus Canbya of the poppy family. It is found in the western Mojave Desert of Southern California. It grows 1–3 cm (3/8–1 1/8 in) tall. Its leaves are 5–9 mm (3/16–11/32 in) long. The flowers are borne in leaf axils, and have 5–7 white petals that are each 3–4 mm (1/8–5/32 in) long, and 6-9 stamens.
