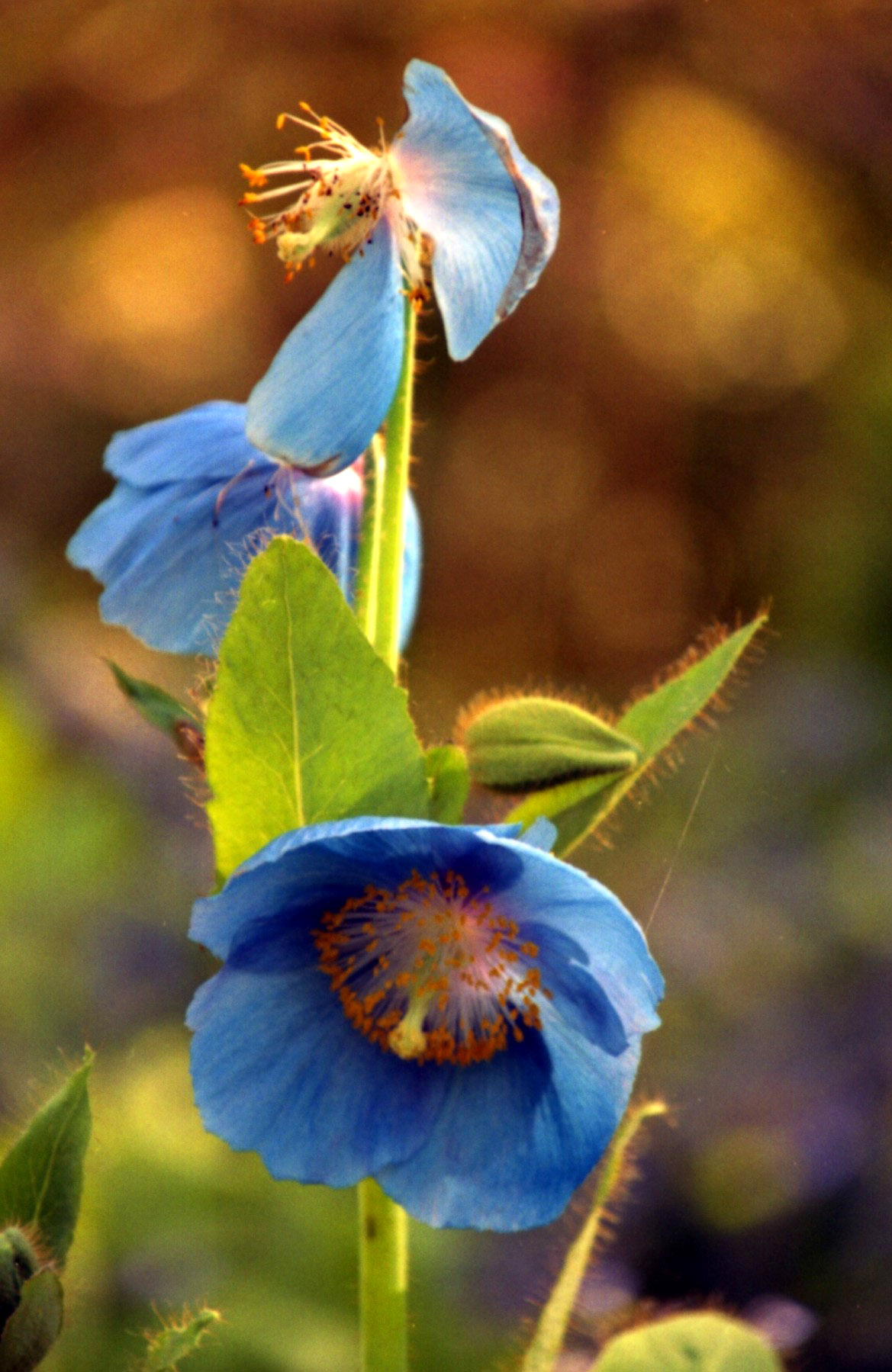

Scientific classification
- Kingdom: Plantae
- Clade: Embryophytes
- Clade: Tracheophytes
- Clade: Spermatophytes
- Clade: Angiosperms
- Clade: Eudicots
- Order: Ranunculales
- Family: Papaveraceae
- Genus: Meconopsis
- Species: M. simplicifolia

Binomial name
- Meconopsis simplicifolia (D. Don) Walp.

= Meconopsis simplicifolia =

Species of flowering plant in the poppy family

Meconopsis simplicifolia is a perennial in the poppy family, sometimes monocarpic, with a taproot, rosette of leaves with bristly hairs, and blue or purple flowers on leafless stems, native to altitudes of 3,450–5,450 metres (11,300–17,900 ft) in central Nepal and southeastern Tibet.

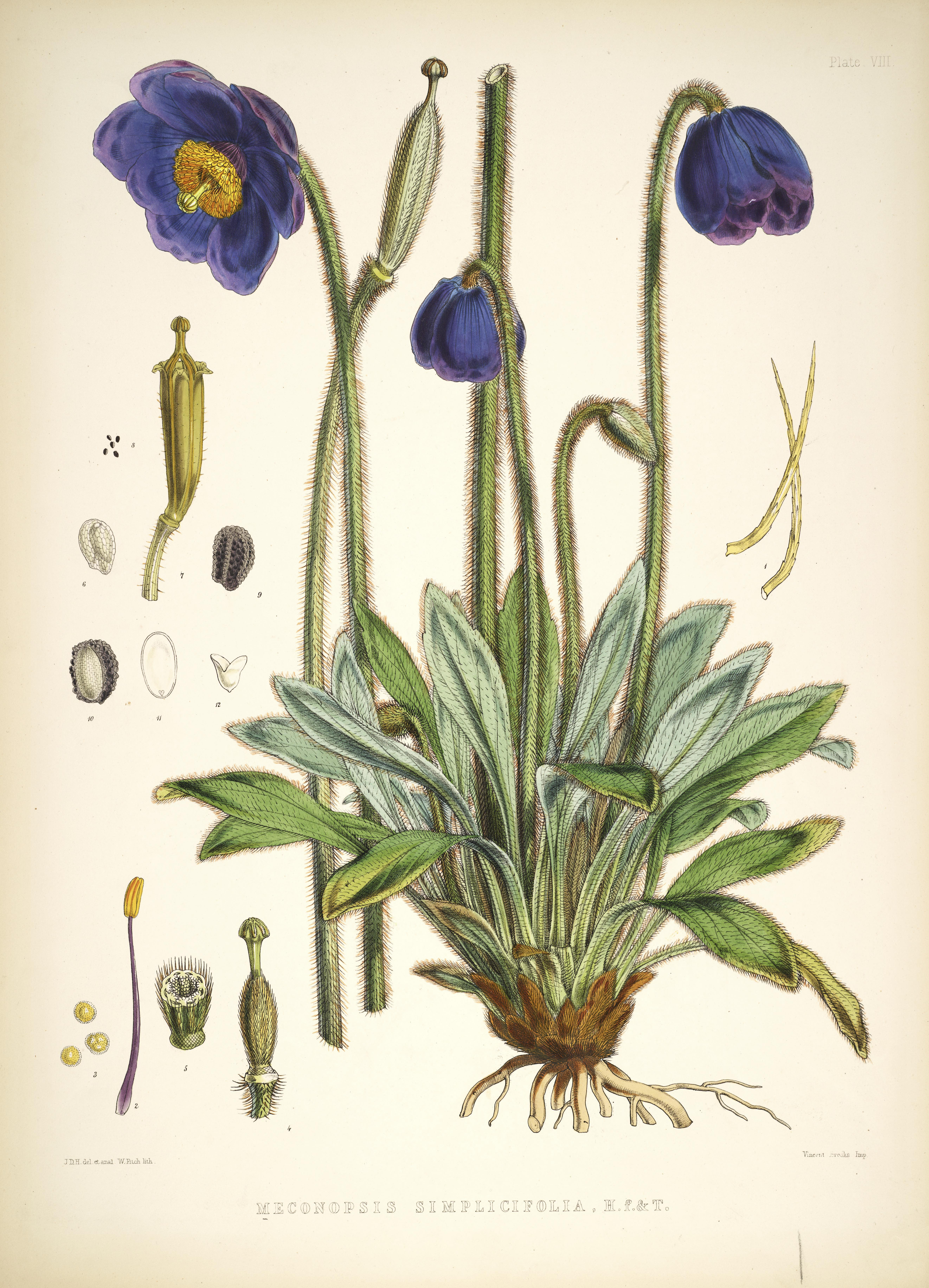
Plate VIII of Illustrations of Himalayan plants
