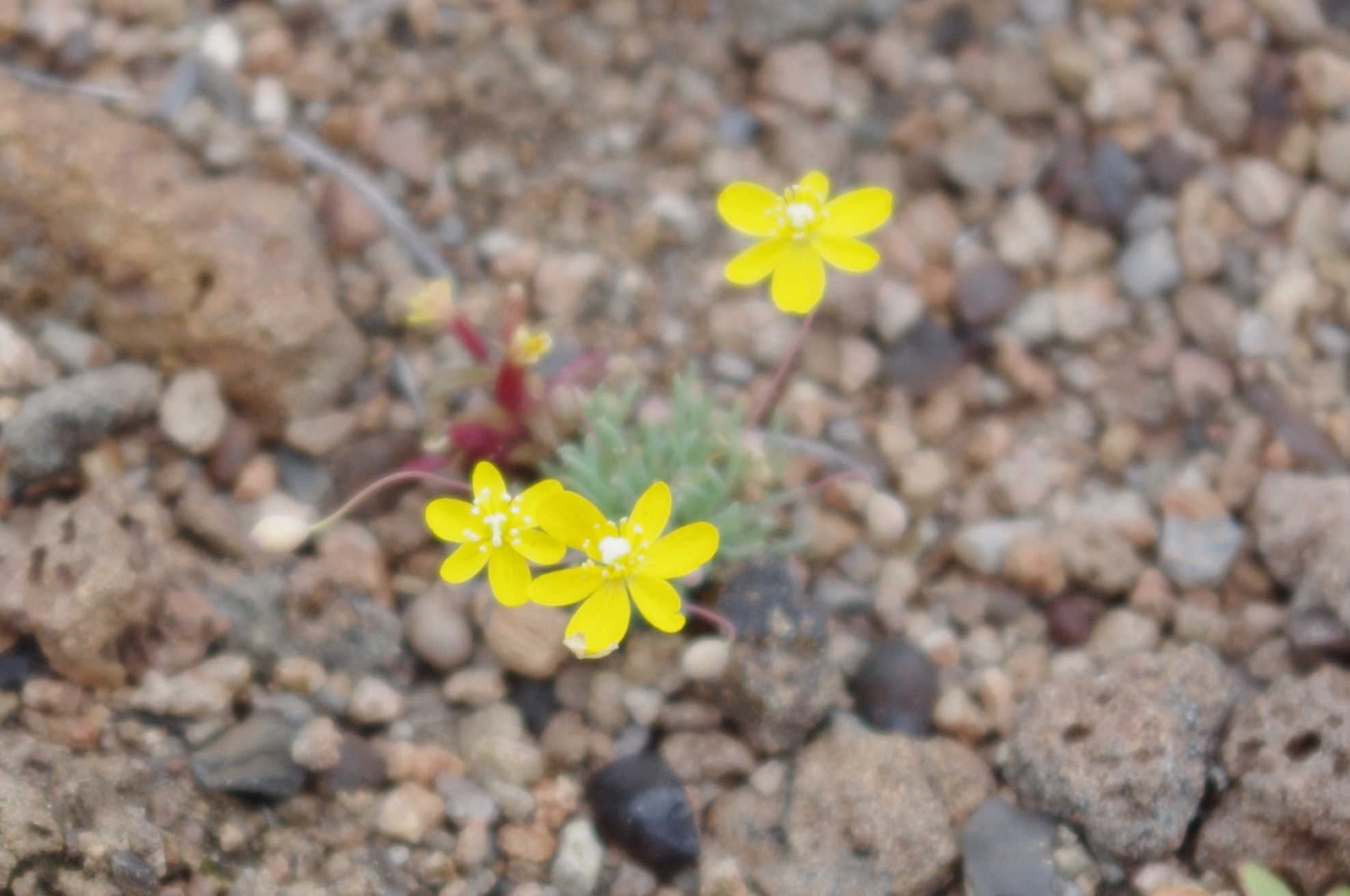

Conservation status
- Vulnerable (NatureServe)

Scientific classification
- Kingdom: Plantae
- Clade: Tracheophytes
- Clade: Angiosperms
- Clade: Eudicots
- Order: Ranunculales
- Family: Papaveraceae
- Genus: Canbya
- Species: C. aurea

Binomial name
- Canbya aurea S. Wats.

= Canbya aurea =

Yellow pygmy-poppy

Species of flowering plant

Canbya aurea, common name yellow pygmy-poppy, is a plant species endemic to the relatively cool northern deserts of the western United States. It is known only from central and southeastern Oregon and northwestern Nevada, as well as one collection reported from Mono County, California. It grows on dry, sandy soil, usually with sagebrush (mostly Artemisia tridentata), at elevations of 900–1,700 metres (2,950–5,580 ft).

Canbya aurea is a small herb rarely more than 2 centimetres (0.79 in) tall, branching at or just above ground level. Leaves are fleshy, linear to oblong, untoothed and unlobed, up to 10 millimetres (0.39 in) long. Flowers are bright yellow, up to 10 millimetres (0.39 in) across.
