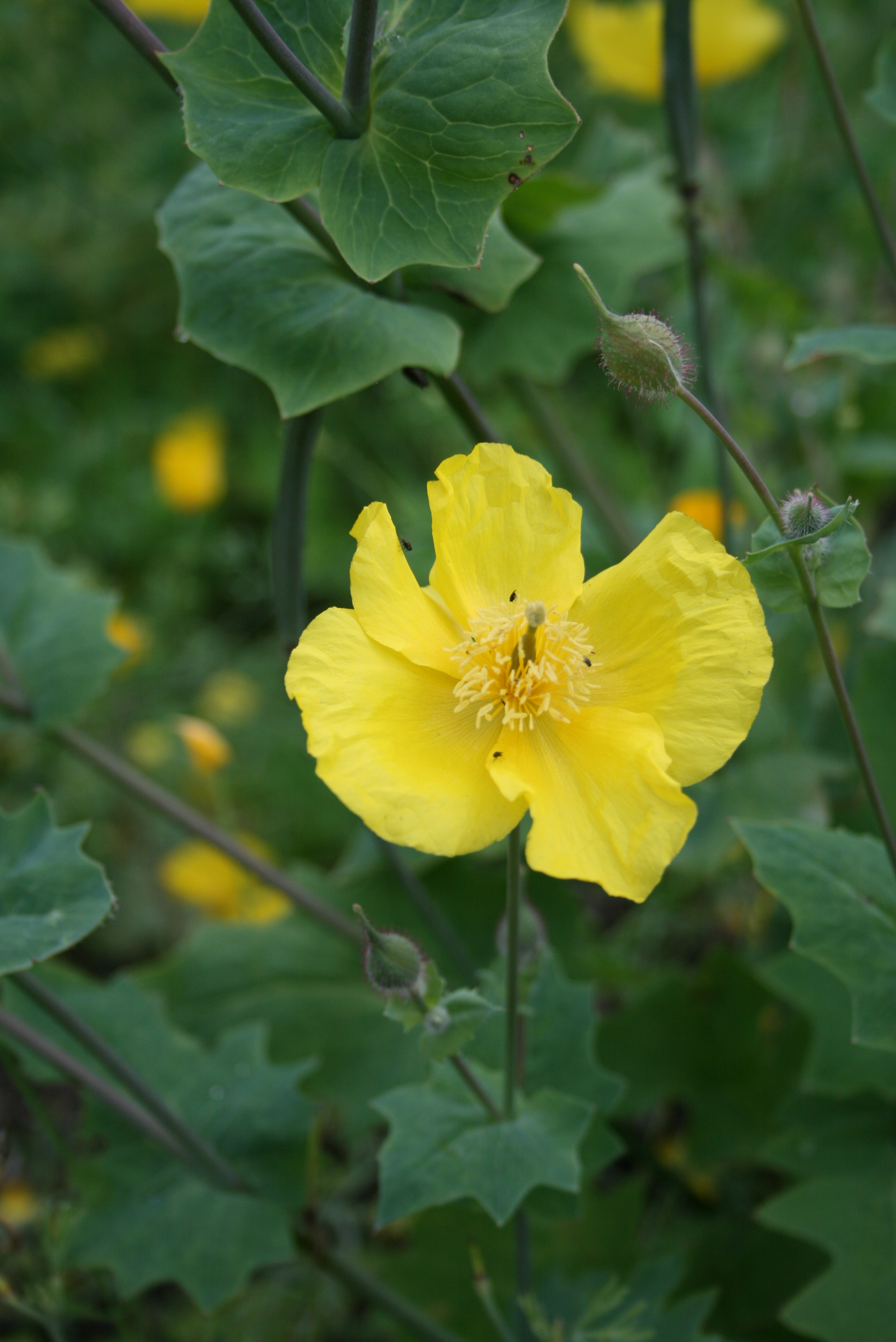
- Dicranostigma erectum

Scientific classification
- Kingdom: Plantae
- Clade: Tracheophytes
- Clade: Angiosperms
- Clade: Eudicots
- Order: Ranunculales
- Family: Papaveraceae
- Subfamily: Papaveroideae
- Tribe: Chelidonieae
- Genus: Dicranostigma; Hook.f. & Thomson

Species
- Dicranostigma erectum; Dicranostigma fimbrilligerum; Dicranostigma franchetianum; Dicranostigma henanense; Dicranostigma iliensis; Dicranostigma lactucoides; Dicranostigma leptopodon; Dicranostigma platycarpum

= Dicranostigma =

Genus of flowering plants

Dicranostigma, also known as the eastern horned poppies, is a genus in the poppy family Papaveraceae, the species of which are native to the Himalaya and western China. Although resembling the true horned poppies of Glaucium, they have stigmas with two lobes and fruit with only traces of the "horns".

A number of the species have only been recently published.

The annual Dicranostigma erectum and biennial/perennial Dicranostigma lactucoides ("Himalayan horned poppy") are regularly cultivated.
