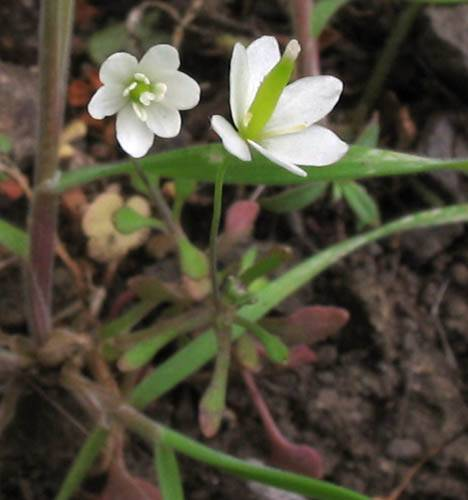

Scientific classification
- Kingdom: Plantae
- Clade: Embryophytes
- Clade: Tracheophytes
- Clade: Spermatophytes
- Clade: Angiosperms
- Clade: Eudicots
- Order: Ranunculales
- Family: Papaveraceae
- Genus: Meconella
- Species: M. denticulata

Binomial name
- Meconella denticulata Greene

= Meconella denticulata =

Species of flowering plant

Meconella denticulata is a species of flowering plant in the poppy family known by the common name smallflower fairypoppy.

It is endemic to California, where it grows in the coastal mountain ranges from around the San Francisco Bay Area to the Peninsular Ranges in the southern part of the state.

== Description ==
Meconella denticulata is an annual herb growing up to 20 or 30 centimeters tall. The leaves are linear to oval in shape, sometimes slightly toothed, and 1 to 4 centimeters in length.

The inflorescence is a single flower on a narrow peduncle. It has usually 6 white petals each a few millimeters long.

The fruit is a narrow, twisting capsule 2 or 3 centimeters in maximum length containing many tiny seeds.
