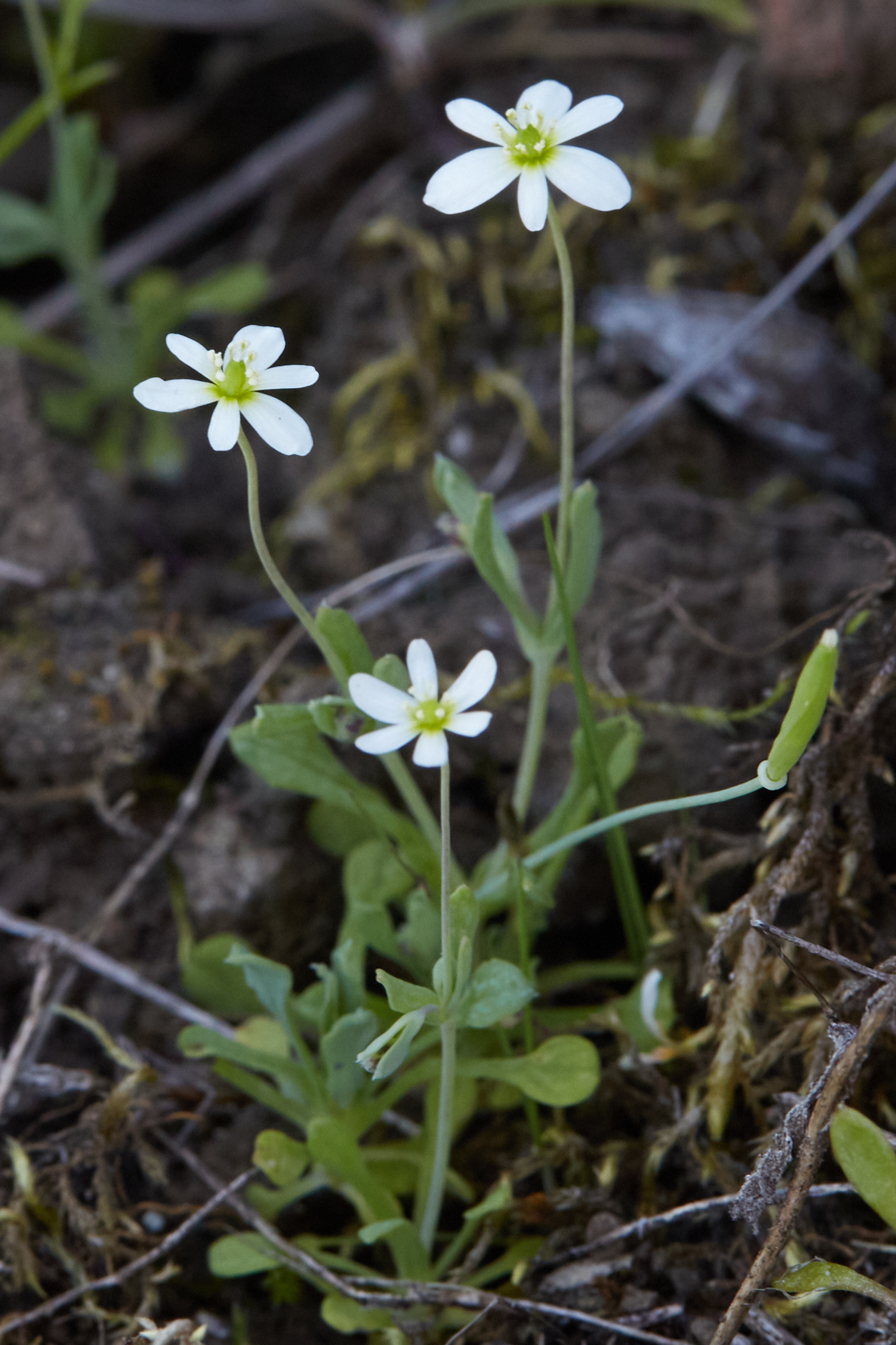

Conservation status
- Imperiled (NatureServe)

Scientific classification
- Kingdom: Plantae
- Clade: Tracheophytes
- Clade: Angiosperms
- Clade: Eudicots
- Order: Ranunculales
- Family: Papaveraceae
- Genus: Meconella
- Species: M. oregana

Binomial name
- Meconella oregana Nutt.

Synonyms
- Platystigma oreganum (Nutt.) Benth. & Hook.f. ex S.Watson

= Meconella oregana =

Species of flowering plant

Meconella oregana, the white fairypoppy, is a flowering plant species native to Oregon, California, Washington and British Columbia. It grows on sandy bluffs, meadows and stream banks, at elevations of less than 300 m (1000 feet).

Meconella oregana is a small herb up to 16 cm (6.3 inches) tall. It has narrow, linear leaves up to 18 mm (0.7 inches) long. Flowers are solitary on long, thin stalks, white with 4-6 stamens (compared with 8-12 stamens in M. californica).
