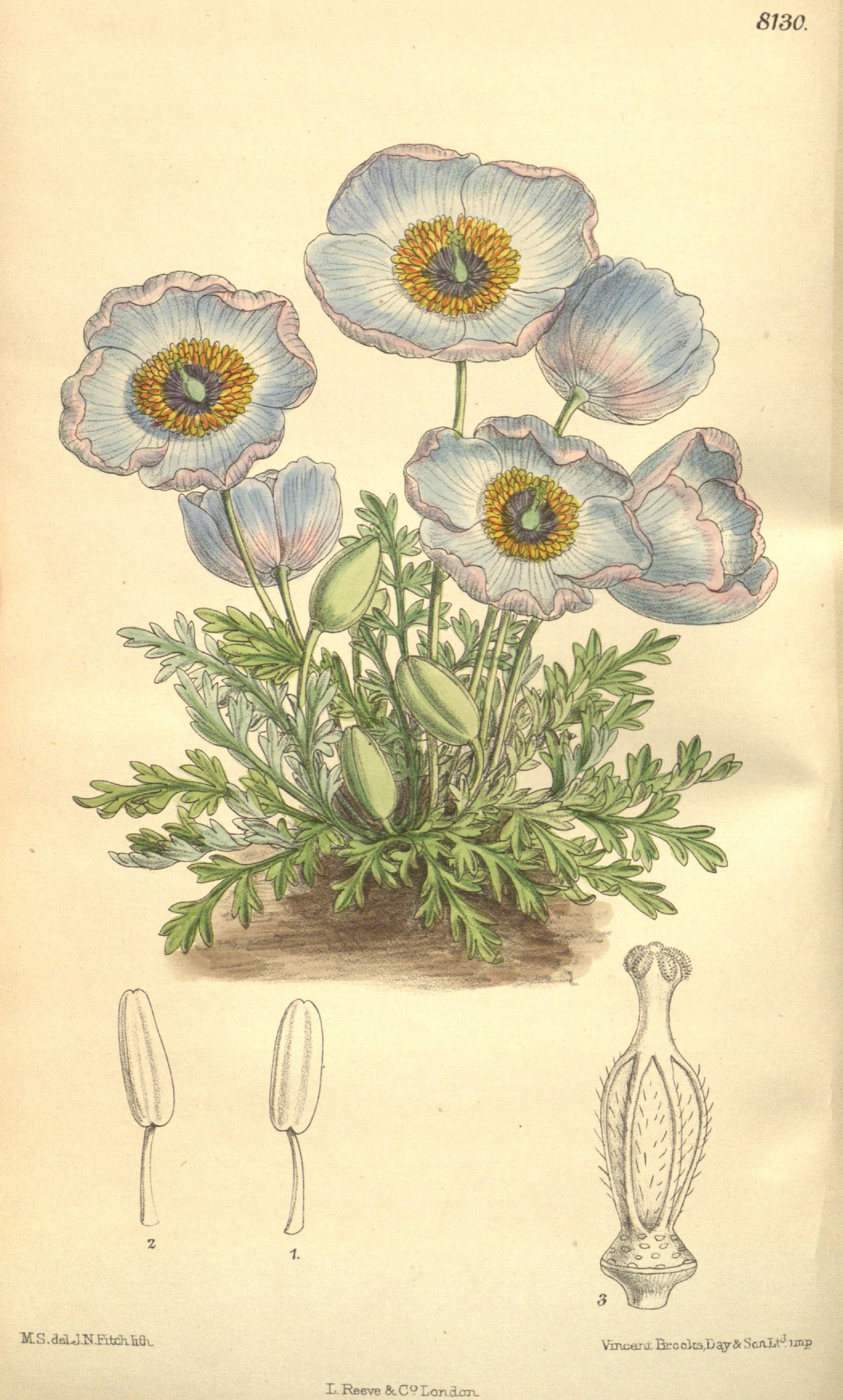

Scientific classification
- Kingdom: Plantae
- Clade: Embryophytes
- Clade: Tracheophytes
- Clade: Spermatophytes
- Clade: Angiosperms
- Clade: Eudicots
- Order: Ranunculales
- Family: Papaveraceae
- Genus: Meconopsis
- Species: M. bella

Binomial name
- Meconopsis bella Prain

= Meconopsis bella =

Species of flowering plant in the poppy family

Meconopsis bella is commonly known as the pretty blue poppy. M. bella is a species of the genus Meconopsis which is found from central Nepal to southeastern Tibet. It is a herbaceous flowering plant and is a part of the poppy family Papaveraceae. This plant is also referred to as Meconopsis bella prain, since it was aptly names by the botanist Prain.

== Distribution ==
Meconopsis bella is one of the four species of the meconopsis family that occurs in the Himalayan alpine zone. It is found in from central Nepal to southeastern Tibet at altitudes ranging from 3,500 to 5,000 m (11,500 to 16,400 ft). It is found in rock crevices and grass cliff edges.

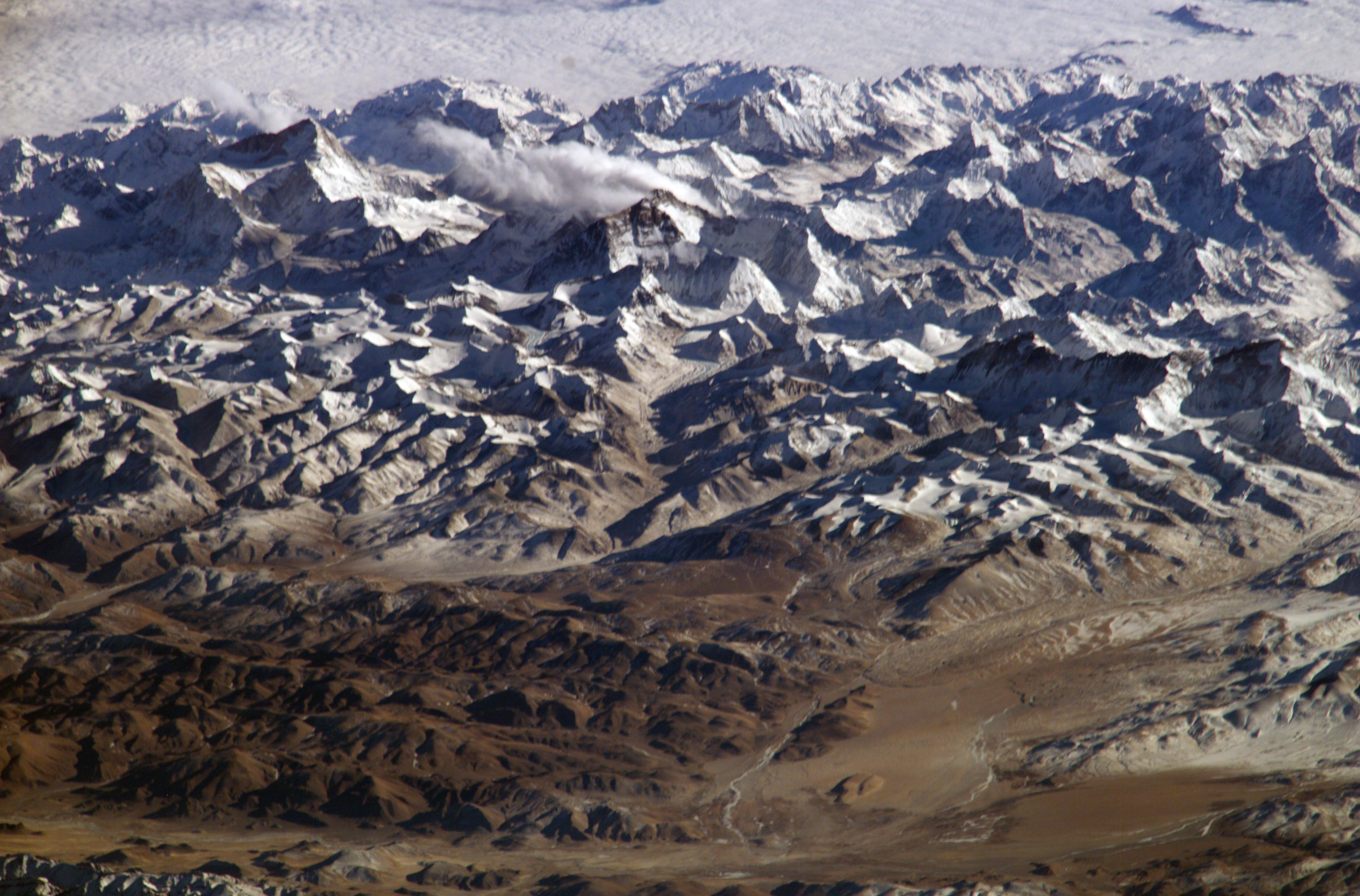
The Himalayan Alpines

== Habitat and ecology ==
Meconopsis bella is a deciduous, perennial plant that grows in rock crevices and grass cliff edges. As a perennial plant, it lives for over two years. It dies in autumn and winter to a resting bud and then emerges again in the spring and summer. As a perennial flowering plant, it grows from the root-stalk as opposed to from a seed. This pretty blue poppy thrives in poor, drained soil, and on a cool, half shaded raised bed.

== Morphology ==
Individuals of this species are tufted perennial plants with thick taproots carrying old leaf stalks. There are no leaves at the stem, only on the base. The leaves on the base can be entire or lobed. The flowers are nodding, and grow singly on slender stems; the stems are usually about 20 cm (8 in) long. Flowers can be pale blue, purple, or pink and can be either hairless or bristly haired. Several flowers are produced from the same rosette in succession. The petals are 1.5–3 cm (0.6–1.2 in) long and have undulate margins.
