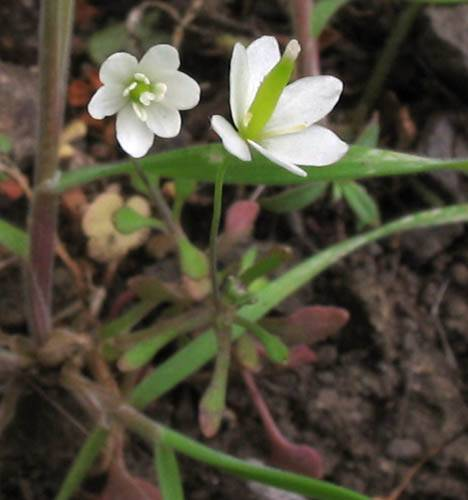
- Meconella denticulata

Scientific classification
- Kingdom: Plantae
- Clade: Embryophytes
- Clade: Tracheophytes
- Clade: Spermatophytes
- Clade: Angiosperms
- Clade: Eudicots
- Order: Ranunculales
- Family: Papaveraceae
- Subfamily: Papaveroideae
- Tribe: Platystemoneae
- Genus: Meconella; Nutt.

Type species
- Meconella oregana

= Meconella =

Genus of flowering plants in the poppy family

Meconella is a small genus of flowering plants in the poppy family. They are known generally as fairypoppies.

== Species ==
There are about 3 species:

Image	Name	Distribution
	Meconella californica – California fairypoppy	around the San Francisco Bay Area and the Sierra foothills
	Meconella denticulata – smallflower fairypoppy	from around the San Francisco Bay Area to the Peninsular Ranges
	Meconella oregana – white fairypoppy	Oregon, California, Washington and British Columbia.

A fourth species, Meconella linearis, is sometimes treated as Platystigma linearis or Hesperomecon linearis.

The species are endemic from British Columbia, Canada south to California.
