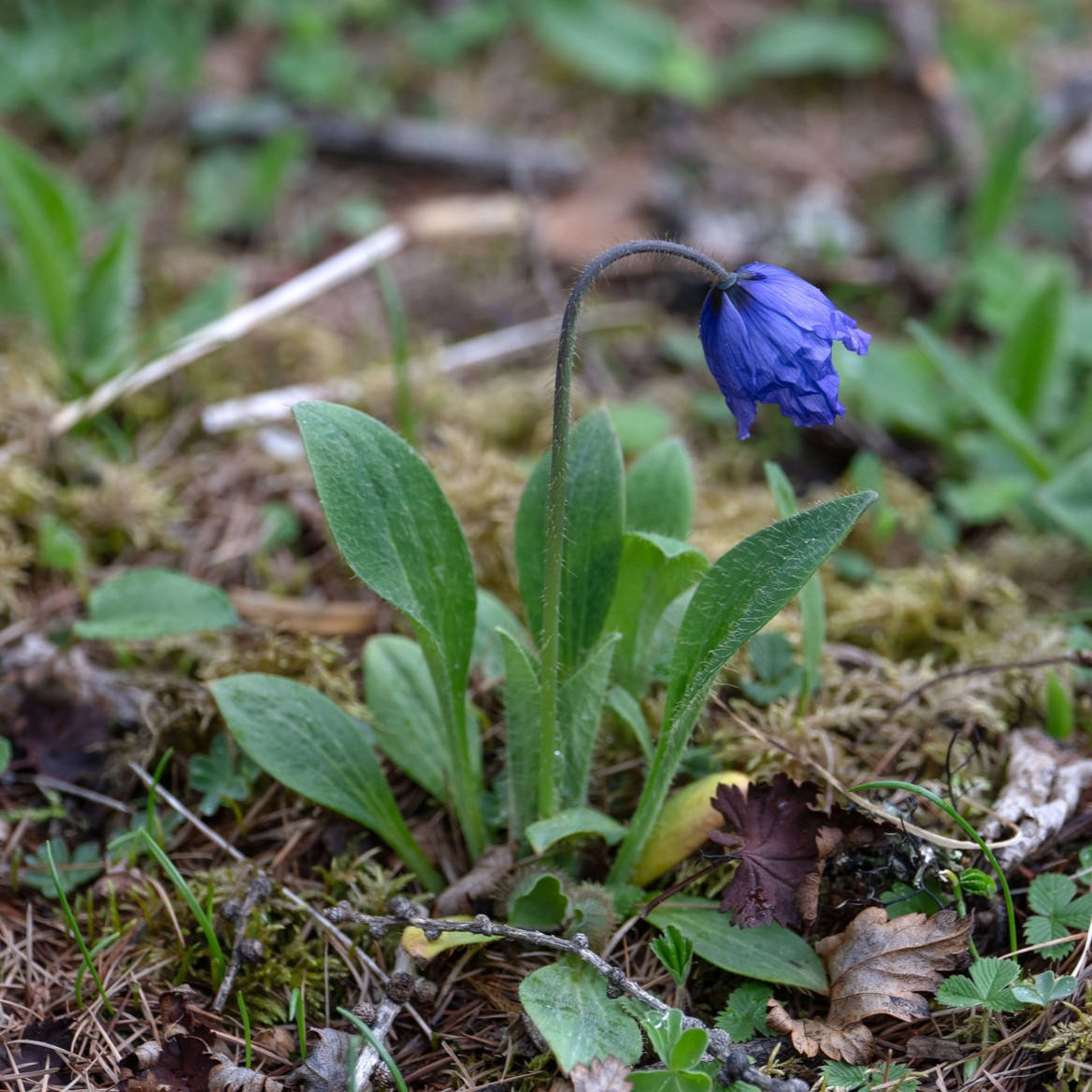
- In Sichuan, China

Scientific classification
- Kingdom: Plantae
- Clade: Embryophytes
- Clade: Tracheophytes
- Clade: Spermatophytes
- Clade: Angiosperms
- Clade: Eudicots
- Order: Ranunculales
- Family: Papaveraceae
- Genus: Meconopsis
- Species: M. quintuplinervia

Binomial name
- Meconopsis quintuplinervia Regel

Synonyms
- Meconopsis biloba; Papaver quintuplinervium

= Meconopsis quintuplinervia =

Species of flowering plant

Meconopsis quintuplinervia, the harebell poppy, is a species of flowering plant in the poppy family, native to China. It has gained the Royal Horticultural Society's Award of Garden Merit.

== Taxonomy ==
Meconopsis quintuplinervia was scientifically describe and named in 1876 by Eduard August von Regel. In 2018 the botanists Maarten J. M. Christenhusz and James W. Byng published an argument for moving it to the genus Papaver, but this has not become the accepted name. It has no varieties and has 4 synonyms.

Table of Synonyms
Name	Year	Rank	Notes
Meconopsis biloba L.Z.An, Shu Y.Chen & Y.S.Lian	2009	species	= het.
Meconopsis punicea var. limprichtii Fedde	1921	variety	= het.
Meconopsis quintuplinervia var. glabra M.C.Wang & P.H.Yang	1990	variety	= het.
Papaver quintuplinervium (Regel) Christenh. & Byng	2018	species	≡ hom.
Notes: ≡ homotypic synonym ; = heterotypic synonym
