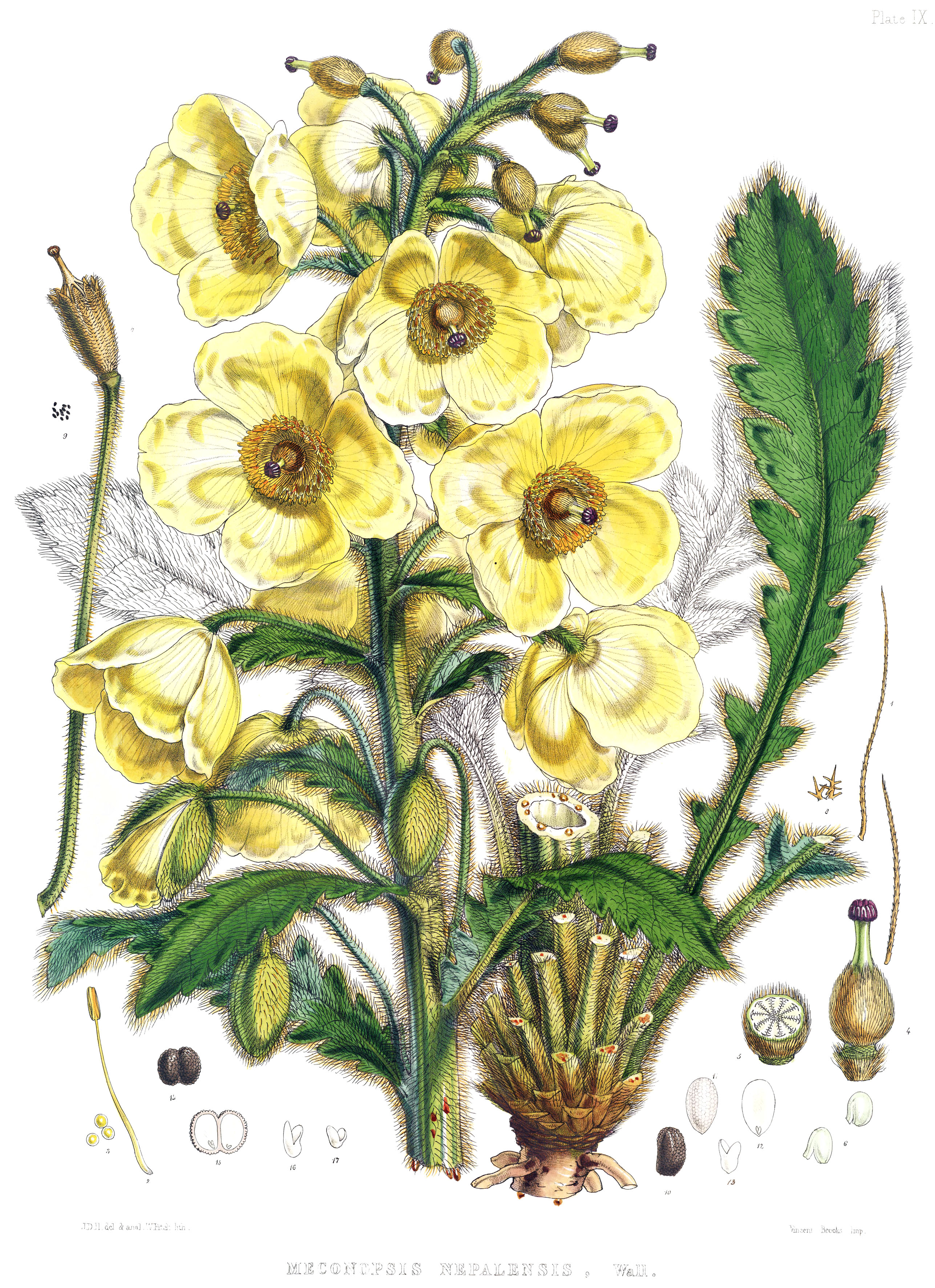

Scientific classification
- Kingdom: Plantae
- Clade: Embryophytes
- Clade: Tracheophytes
- Clade: Spermatophytes
- Clade: Angiosperms
- Clade: Eudicots
- Order: Ranunculales
- Family: Papaveraceae
- Genus: Meconopsis
- Species: M. napaulensis

Binomial name
- Meconopsis napaulensis DC.

Synonyms
- Meconopsis nepalensis

= Meconopsis napaulensis =

Nepal poppy

Species of flowering plant in the poppy family

Meconopsis napaulensis, the Nepal poppy or satin poppy, is a plant of the family Papaveraceae. The plant contains beta-carbolines, which (in doses high enough) act as a psychedelic drug. However, its phytochemistry remains predominantly unstudied.

Recent taxonomical reclassification by Grey-Wilson (2006) has separated four new species from M. napaulensis: M. chankheliensis, M. ganeshensis, M. staintonii and M. wilsonii, while M. wallichii has been reinstated. M. wallichii had been previously described in 1852 by Hooker, but was later placed under the species M. napaulensis by Taylor in 1934.

In light of the current reclassification by Grey-Wilson, the description of the species M. napaulensis is subsequently much more refined. Based on the type specimen, it is only yellow in flower, with a small geographical range in central Nepal.

Prior to the recent reclassification of Meconopsis napaulensis, flower colours of the species ranged between red, purple and white, and much of what is grown in gardens under the name M. napaulensis are of this colour. However, the name is now technically misapplied.
