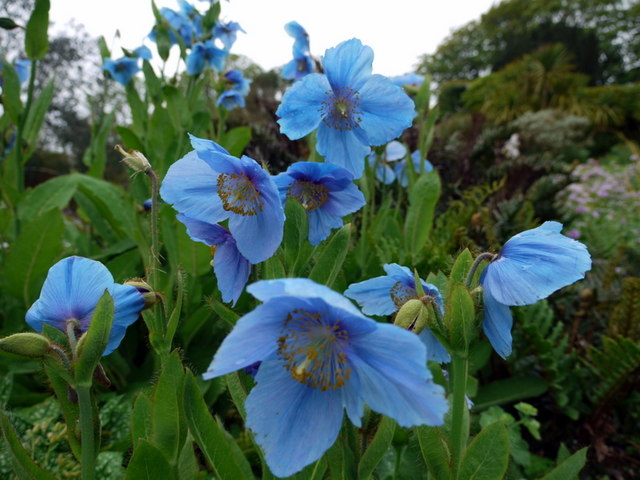

Scientific classification
- Kingdom: Plantae
- Clade: Tracheophytes
- Clade: Angiosperms
- Clade: Eudicots
- Order: Ranunculales
- Family: Papaveraceae
- Genus: Meconopsis
- Species: M. grandis

Binomial name
- Meconopsis grandis Prain

= Meconopsis grandis =

Species of plant

Meconopsis grandis, the Himalayan blue poppy, is a species of flowering plant in the poppy family (Papaveraceae), native to China (Yunnan), Bhutan, northeast India and Nepal.

Growing to 1 m (3.3 ft) tall and broad, this hardy herbaceous perennial has a basal rosette of toothed leaves. Large, showy, pure blue flowers up to 15 cm (5.9 in) wide, with a prominent yellow central boss are produced in late Spring.

The plant is valued as an ornamental, but is notably difficult to grow in normal garden conditions. Though perennial it can be short-lived. It prefers an evenly cool temperature and shaded conditions, in somewhat acid soil which remains reliably moist.

The following cultivars are recipients of the Royal Horticultural Society's Award of Garden Merit:

- 'Bobby Masterson' (syn. 'Betty Sherriff's Dream Poppy')
- 'Mrs Jebb'
