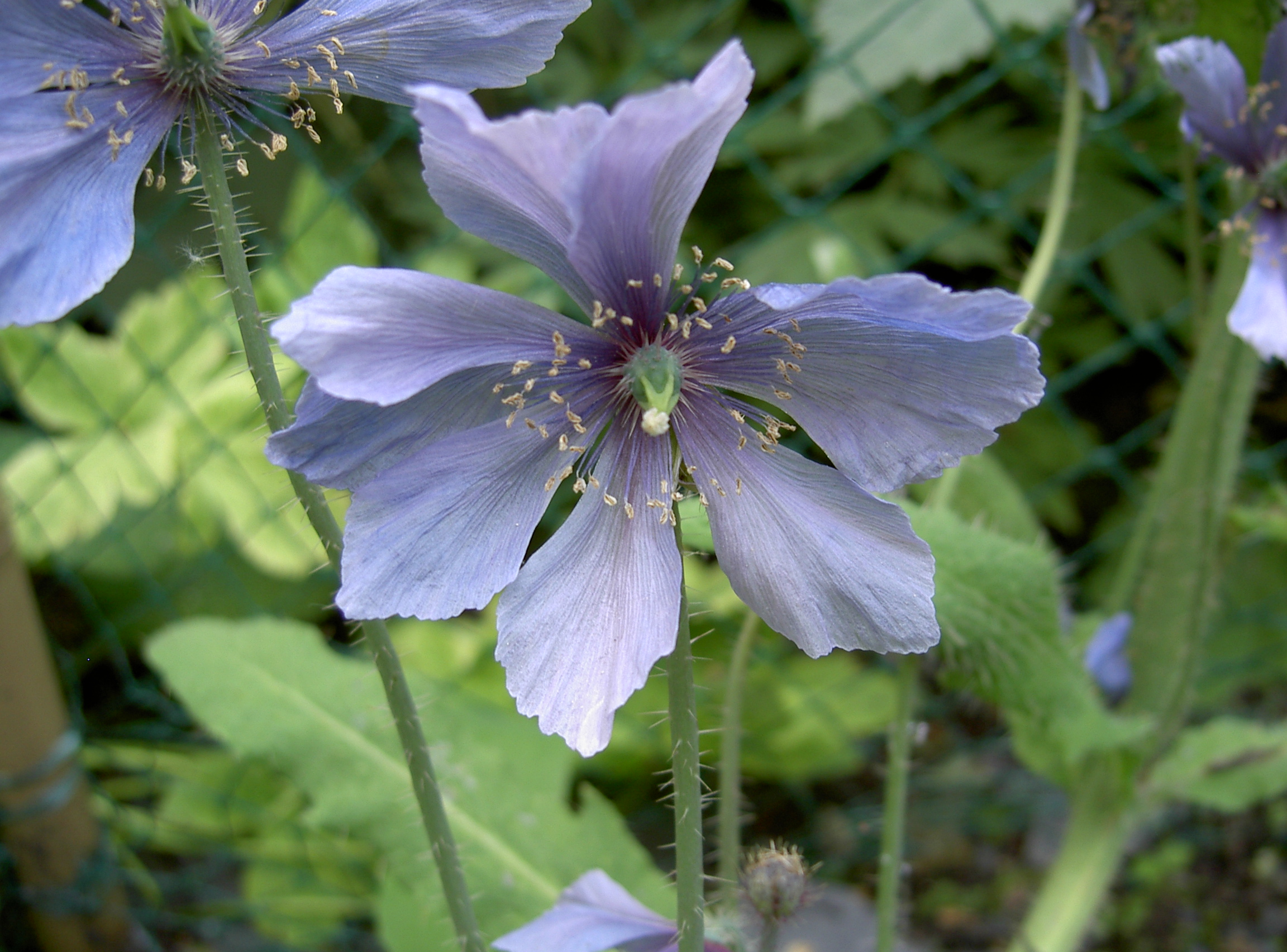

Scientific classification
- Kingdom: Plantae
- Clade: Embryophytes
- Clade: Tracheophytes
- Clade: Spermatophytes
- Clade: Angiosperms
- Clade: Eudicots
- Order: Ranunculales
- Family: Papaveraceae
- Genus: Meconopsis
- Species: M. horridula

Binomial name
- Meconopsis horridula Hook.f. & Thomson

= Meconopsis horridula =

Species of flowering plant in the poppy family

Meconopsis horridula, the prickly blue poppy, is a flowering plant from the family Papaveraceae. It grows in high altitudes. The height of the plant varies from 20 cm (7.9 in) to 1 m (3 ft 3 in). It is a monocarpic, dicot plant.

== Morphology ==
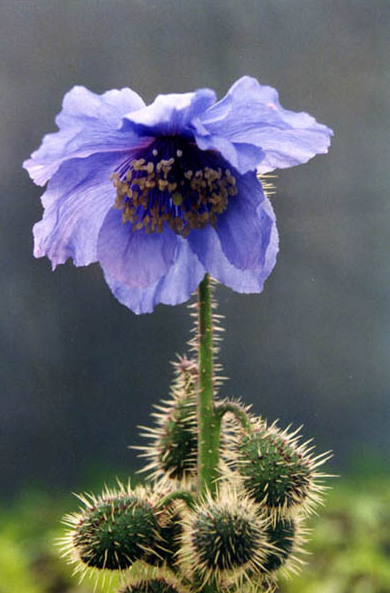
Meconopsis horridula flower with spiny capsules

Meconopsis horridula is a species with many variations in leaf structure and inflorescence. In the wild, the flowers are solitary or arranged in a raceme. The plant is monocarpic (it produces seeds and dies) with a plump taproot. The stem and pedicels have straw-colored spines on their surface.

The plant has basal leaves (about 25 cm) arranged in a rosette. The leaves are elliptical or narrow-oblong shaped, tapering into the petiole. The leaf margin is entire or slightly lobed or toothed. The leaves have a base attenuate to petiole and an obtuse or acute apex. The adaxial and abaxial surface of the leaf is covered with yellowish or purplish spines that grow from purple wart-like structures. In some cases they are covered with bristles. The upper leaves are smaller and bract-like. It has deciduous leaves.

The open-faced flowers are usually in shades of blue or reddish blue, but rarely white. The flowers are 5–7.5 cm (2.0–3.0 in) in size. The stalk is usually less than 22 cm (8.7 in) long. The stalk that bears the flower is bent, so the flower is not held upright and is droopy. The overlapping petals are arranged in a broad cup shape. The 4-8 petals are oval. The sepals have bristles on the adaxial surface. When solitary, flowers are arranged on scape. In some cases, the flowers are gathered together (agglomerated) in the lower half of the stem.

The stamens (10–14 mm) hold greyish-black anthers and the pollen is yellow or orange-yellow. The filaments and petals are usually of similar color. The pistil consists of a style (6–7 mm) with yellow stigma. The ovary is conical and has compressed spines on the outer surface.

The seeds are reniform, small, dark brown and have pointed ends. They are contained within a pod covered with spines (spines have thickened base). This pod is called a capsule, which is a domed cylinder tapering towards one end. The capsule is about 1.5 cm to 2 cm long and 0.6 cm to 1.1 cm wide. Since Meconopsis horridula is a dicot plant, the seeds have two cotyledons.

== Distribution ==
Meconopsis horridula can be found from as far west as western Nepal, through the central and eastern Himalayas, to southeastern Tibet (Xizang) and western China (western Kansu to Sichuan and northwestern Yunnan).

== Habitat and ecology ==
Meconopsis horridula grows in rocky areas and grass slopes at altitudes from 3,100 m (10,200 ft) to almost 6,000 m (20,000 ft), close to the limit for vegetation at these altitudes. These plants can be grown in slightly shaded or sunny, cool areas, in meadows and rocky regions. They can also grow with other shrubs such as the rhododendron. They require plenty of moisture while growing and do not need protection from winter. Since they grow on high altitudes, they can tolerate temperatures as low as −10 °F (−23 °C). The flower color is not affected by the alkalinity of the soil.

== Usage ==
Meconopsis horridula is used for ornamental and horticultural purposes but considering the monocarpic nature of the plant, it is difficult to cultivate. It has been cultivated from 1904, mostly coming from China and Tibet.

When cultivated, the basal leaves die and a dormant bud is left behind along with a tap root. The new saplings have few leaves and are vulnerable to strong winds. The plants take about two years (2–3 seasons after the seed) to reach the flowering stage. They are fairly resistant to droughts. They are tolerant and robust when it comes to growing in gardens. When the flowers are in a raceme, the flowers at the top bloom first and turn into fruits by the time the lower flowers have bloomed.

The seeds germinate when sown in mild heat conditions or a warm bright spot under the sun. Germination of seeds is slow but reliable when sown in a cool place during spring. Plants like well-drained neutral soil. The young seedling has heart-shaped leaves.

== Traditional medicine ==
Meconopsis horridula is used in Chinese traditional herbal medicine because of its anti-inflammatory and analgesic qualities. As such, they are widely harvested. Although one plant produces many seeds, germination is low in natural and laboratory settings. As the demand for this plant increases, more and more plants are likely to be uprooted.
