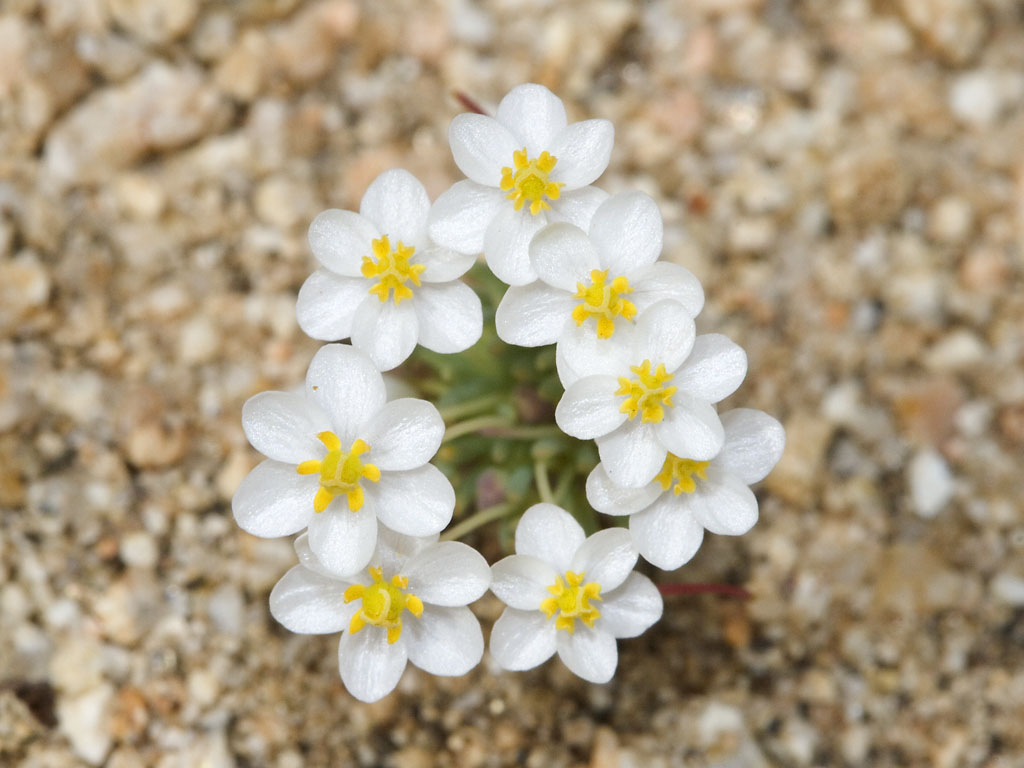
- Pygmy poppy (Canbya candida)

Scientific classification
- Kingdom: Plantae
- Clade: Tracheophytes
- Clade: Angiosperms
- Clade: Eudicots
- Order: Ranunculales
- Family: Papaveraceae
- Subfamily: Papaveroideae
- Tribe: Papavereae
- Genus: Canbya; Parry ex A.Gray

Species
- Canbya aurea; Canbya candida

= Canbya =

Genus of flowering plants

Canbya, also known as the pygmy poppies, is a genus of the poppy family Papaveraceae consisting of two species found in the dry parts of western North America. Both species are small, no more than a few centimeters tall, with flowers less than 10 mm across.

The genus was named after well-known amateur botanist William Marriott Canby (1831–1904).

== Species ==
Image	Name	Distribution
	Canbya aurea - yellow pygmy-poppy	Central and southeastern Oregon and northwestern Nevada
	Canbya candida - pygmy poppy, white pygmy poppy	western Mojave Desert of Southern California.
