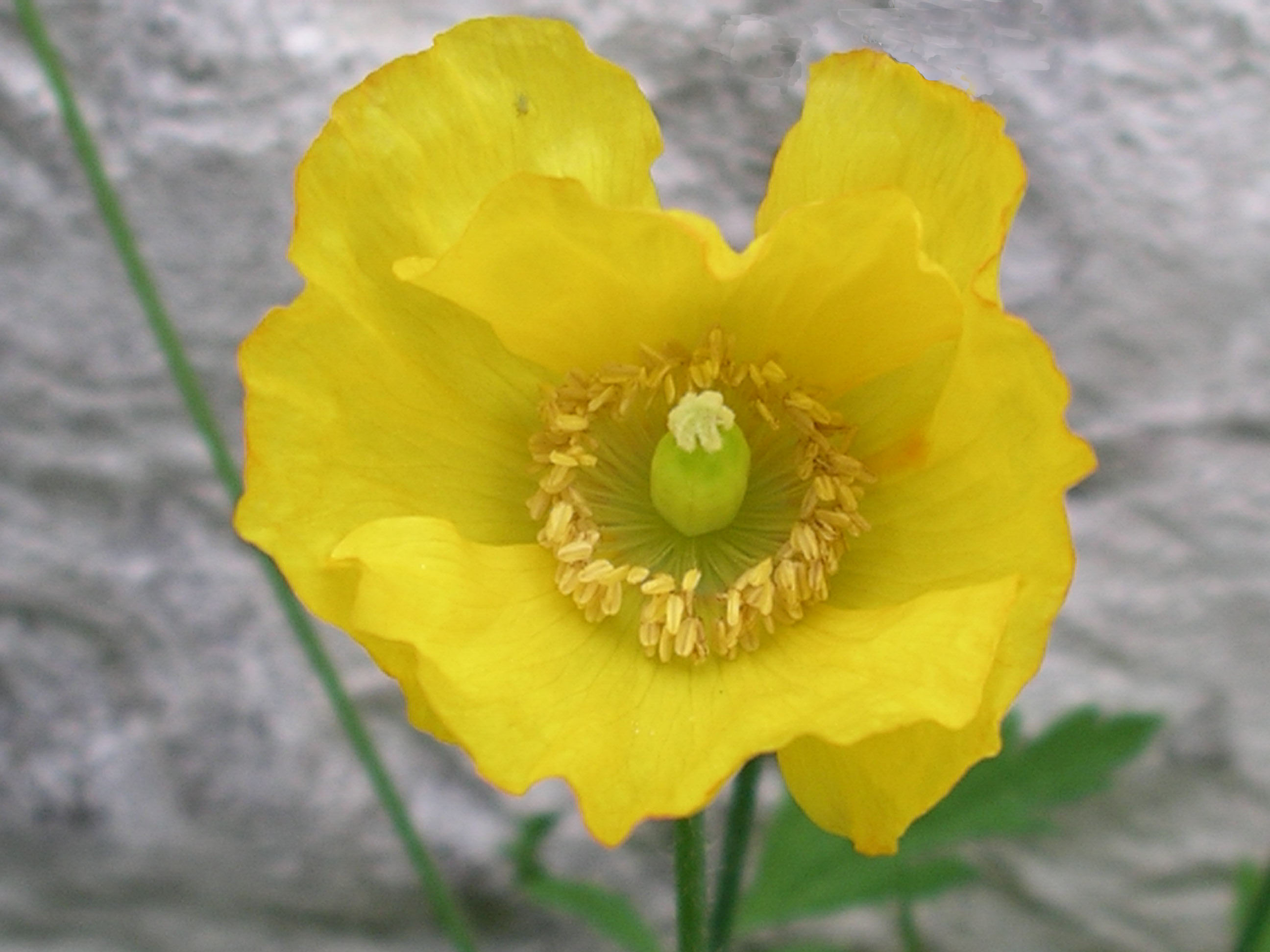

Scientific classification
- Kingdom: Plantae
- Clade: Embryophytes
- Clade: Tracheophytes
- Clade: Spermatophytes
- Clade: Angiosperms
- Clade: Eudicots
- Order: Ranunculales
- Family: Papaveraceae
- Genus: Papaver
- Species: P. cambricum

Binomial name
- Papaver cambricum L.

Synonyms
- Argemone cambrica (L.) Desf.; Cerastites cambricus (L.) Gray; Meconopsis cambrica (L.) Vig.; Papaver flavum Moench; Papaver luteum Lam.; Parameconopsis cambrica (L.) Grey-Wilson; Stylophorum cambricum (L.) Spreng.

= Papaver cambricum =

Species of flowering plant in the poppy family

Papaver cambricum, synonym Meconopsis cambrica, the Welsh poppy, is a perennial flowering plant in the poppy family Papaveraceae. It has yellow to orange flowers and is widely grown as a garden plant. It is a native of damp, rocky sites in upland areas of Western Europe from the British Isles to the Iberian Peninsula. It has been used since 2006 as the basis for the logo of the political party Plaid Cymru.

== Description ==
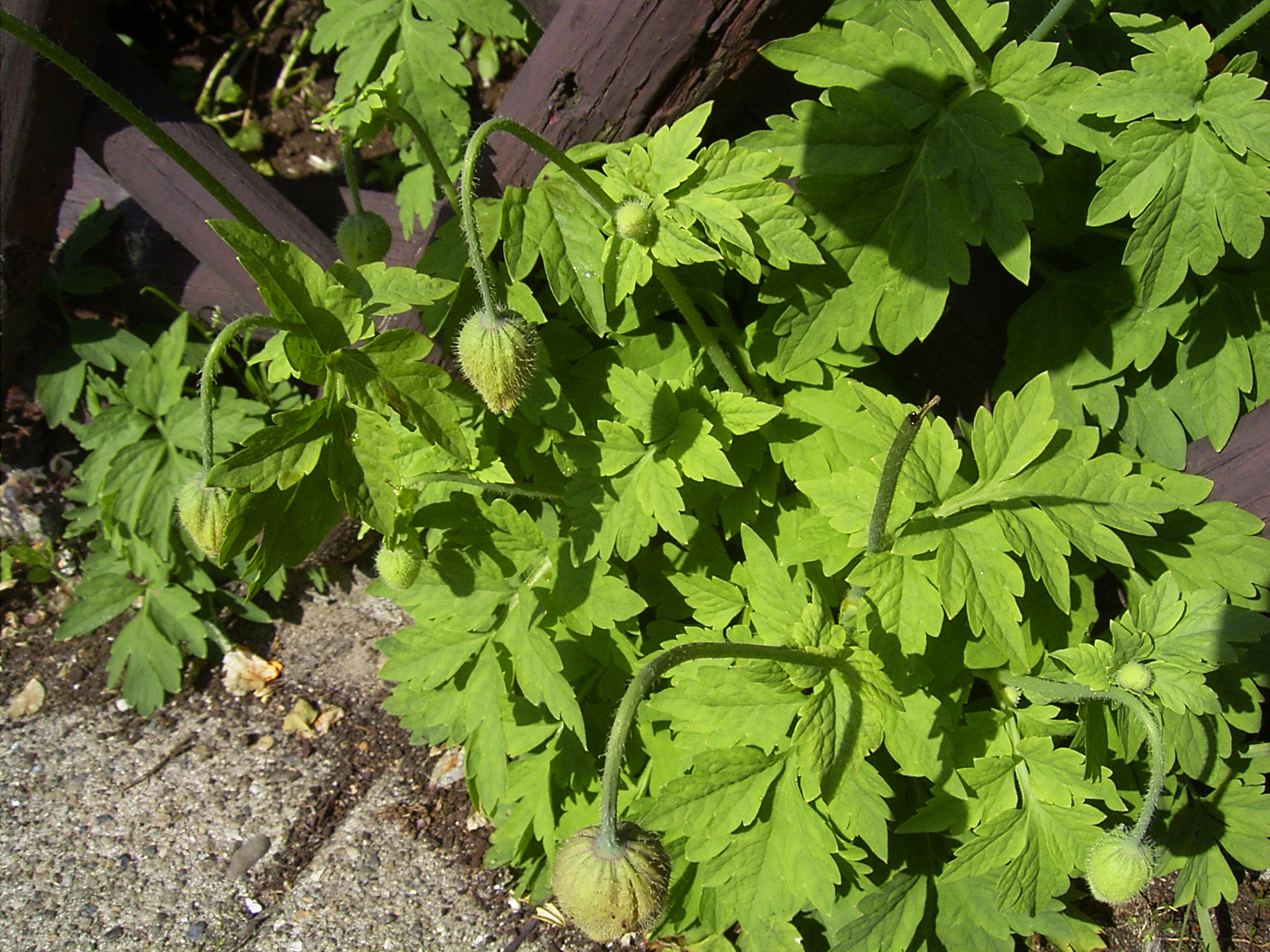
Foliage and unopened flower buds

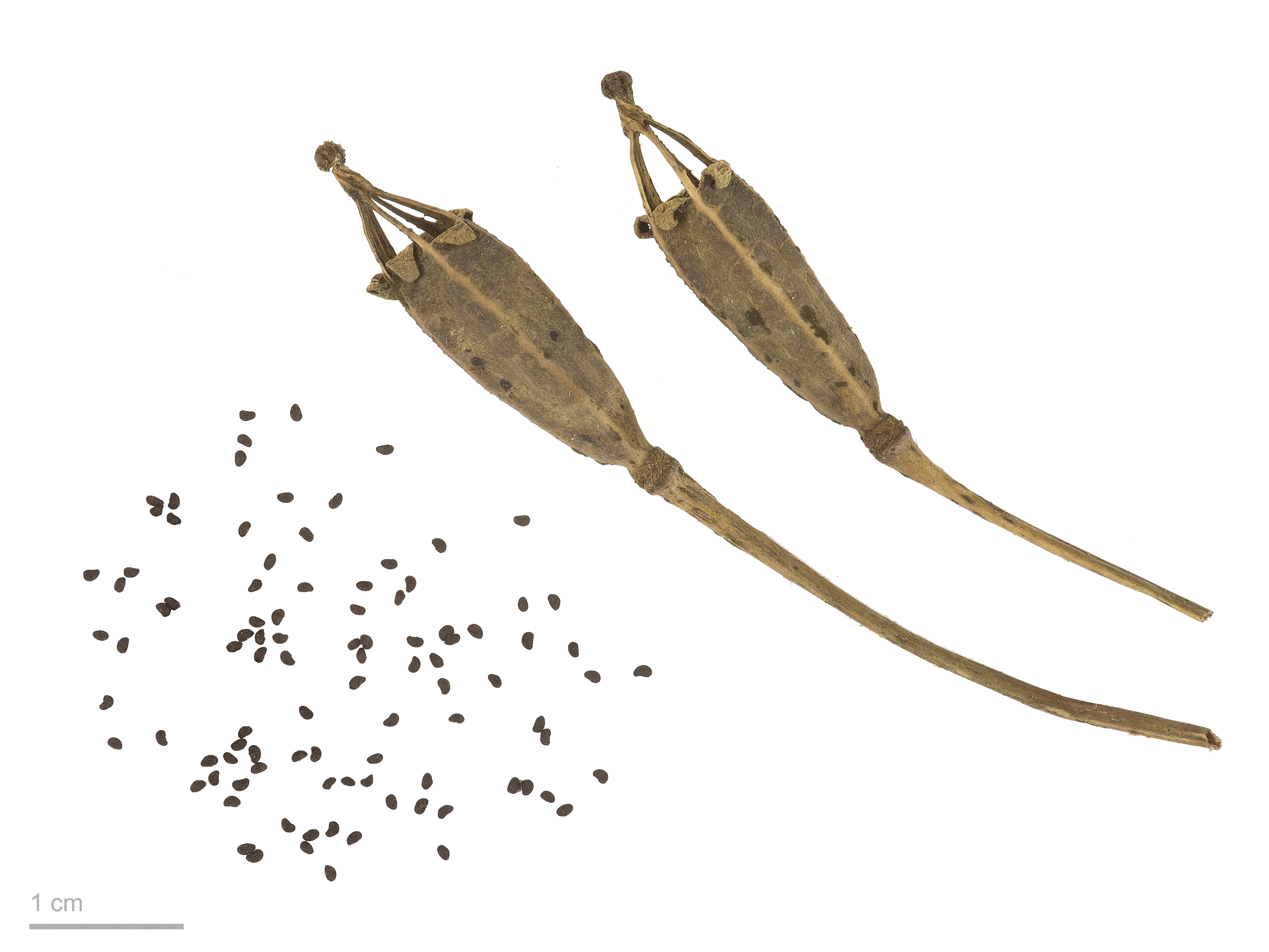
Papaver cambricum - MHNT

Papaver cambricum has pinnately divided leaves composed of pinnately divided leaflets. The plant can grow between 30–60 cm (12–24 in) tall. It blooms between May and July. The flower is distinctively yellow or orange with four petals, and coarsely hairy green sepals that fall off soon after the flower opens. It spreads easily from the numerous small black seeds produced in the summer, from a long, ribbed capsule that opens with flaps.

== Taxonomy and phylogeny ==
The species was originally named by Carl Linnaeus in his 1753 Species Plantarum as Papaver cambricum. In 1814, Louis Viguier separated it from Papaver, making it the type species of his new genus Meconopsis. One of the reasons was the presence of a style: other species in the genus Papaver have unstalked stigmas, arranged in a disc shape, whereas P. cambricum has stigmatic surfaces at the end of a distinct style. Later, many newly discovered species from the Himalayas and adjacent regions of China were added to the genus. As Meconopsis cambricum, it was the only species in the genus native to Europe.

However, a molecular phylogenetic study published in 2011 showed that P. cambricum is not related to Meconopsis species, but is instead nested within Papaver, suggesting that Linnaeus' original name should be restored. However, this would have left the genus Meconopsis without a type species and hence without a valid name, unless the name were to be conserved. A proposal to retain Meconopsis for the Asian species was accepted in 2017, with the conserved type Meconopsis regia G.Taylor. The genus transfer is accepted by many sources.

== Distribution and habitat ==
Papaver cambricum is endemic to upland areas of Western Europe; it is found natively in the mountains of the Iberian Peninsula, the Pyrenees, the Massif Central and some western parts of the British Isles (Wales, south-western England and parts of Ireland). It has, however, been widely naturalised outside its native range.

Papaver cambricum lives in damp, shady places on rocky ground. In its most western locations, it is increasingly found on more open ground with less cover. It is especially well adapted to colonising gaps and crevices in rocks and stones. This habit has enabled it to colonise the urban environment, growing between paving slabs and at the edges of walls.

== In culture ==
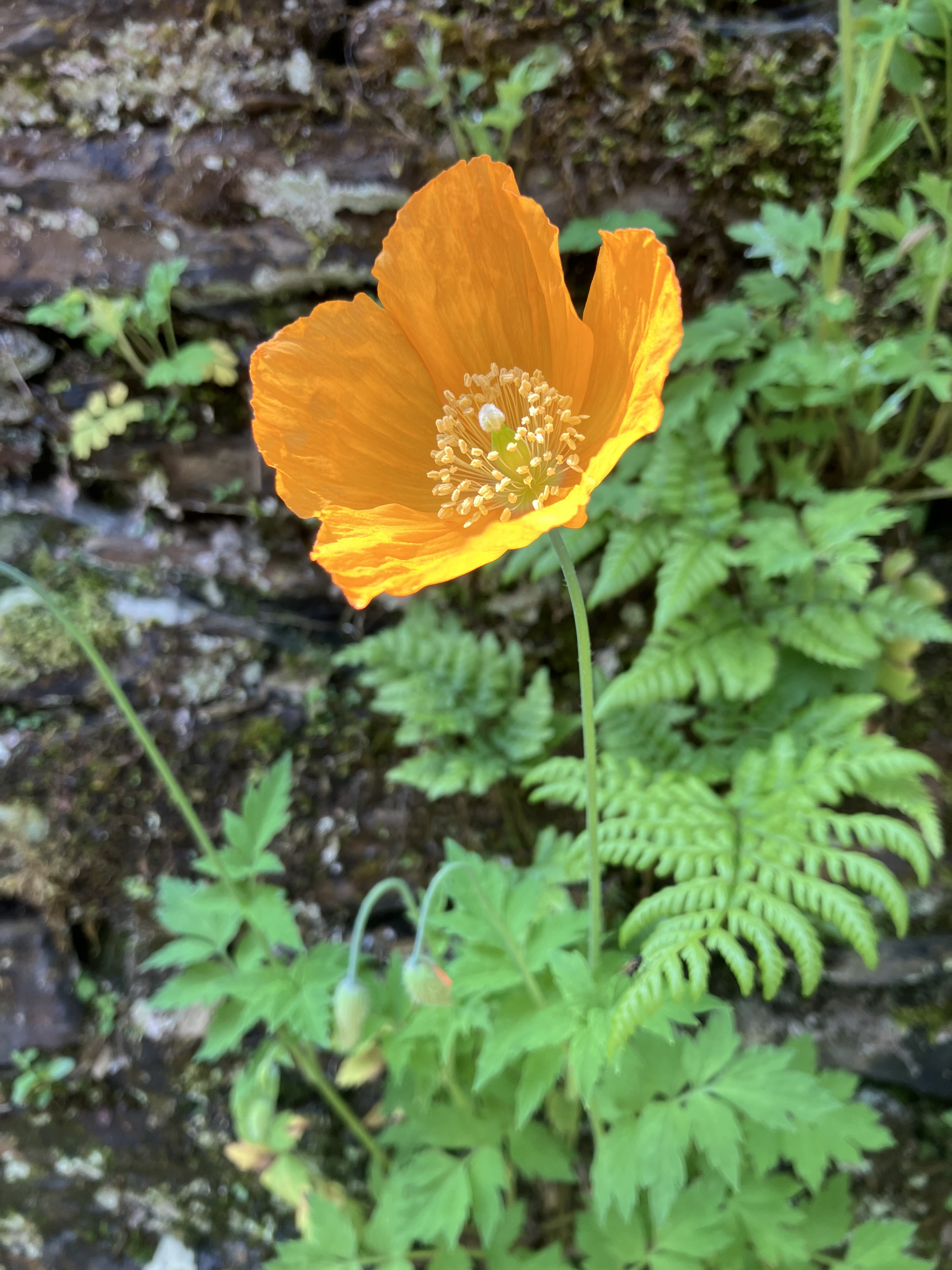
Orange Welsh poppy growing in mossy cracks in a garden wall

On 24 February 2006, the Welsh political party Plaid Cymru adopted a stylised image of P. cambricum as its party logo.

== Alkaloids ==
Mecambrine (Fugapavine) [1093-07-8]

Mecambrine [1093-07-8] is a spiroisoquinoline alkaloid, first isolated from Mecanopsis carnbrica (L.) Vig., is identical with Fugapavine found in Papaver fugax and Papaver caucasicum Marsch.-Bieb.
