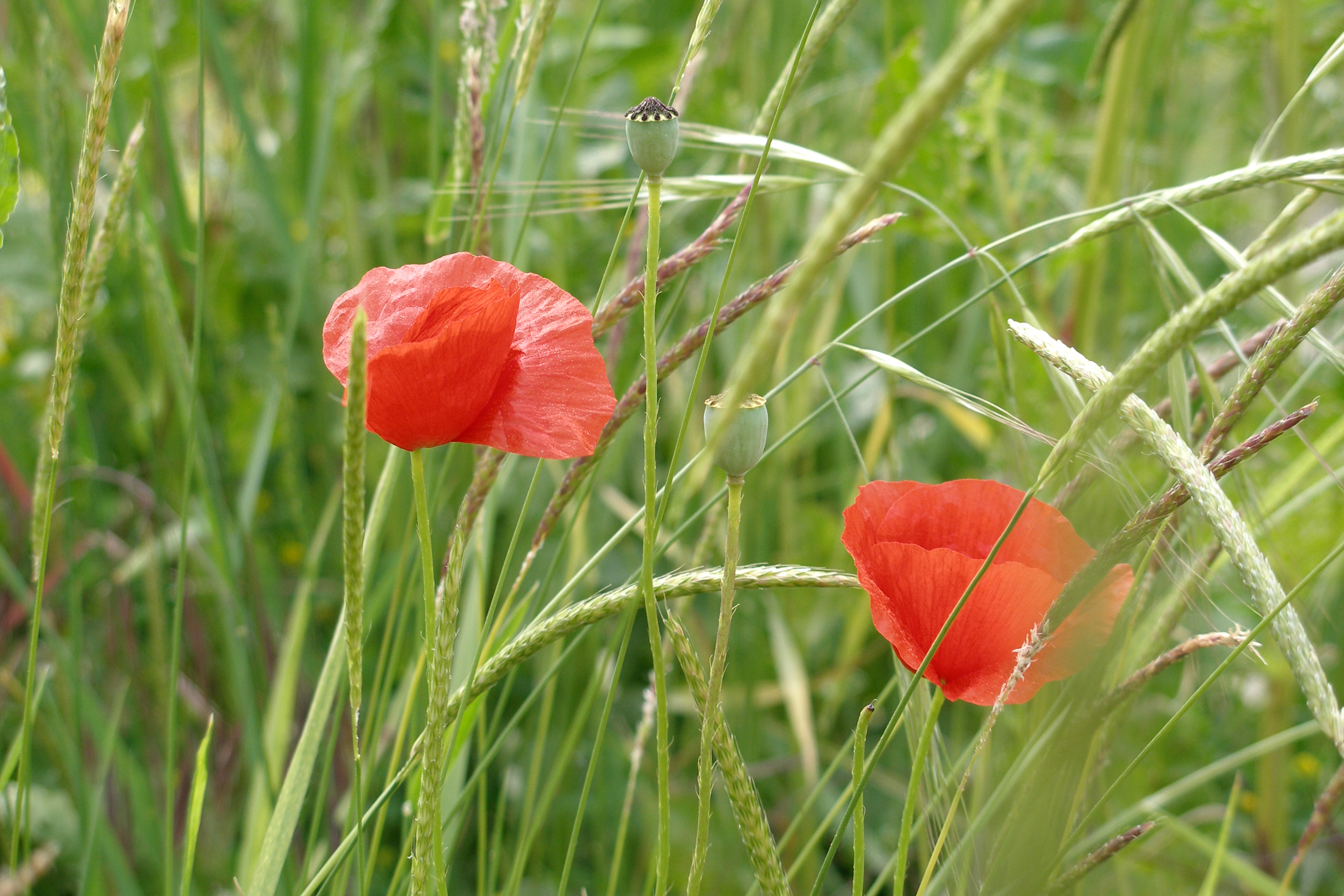
- Papaver rhoeas

Scientific classification
- Kingdom: Plantae
- Clade: Tracheophytes
- Clade: Angiosperms
- Clade: Eudicots
- Order: Ranunculales
- Family: Papaveraceae
- Subfamily: Papaveroideae; Eaton, Bot. Dict., ed. 4: 38. 1836.

Genera
- See text

= Papaveroideae =

Subfamily of flowering plants

Papaveroideae is a subfamily of the family Papaveraceae (the poppy family).

== Genera ==
- Subfamily Papaveroideae Eaton

- Tribe Eschscholzieae Baill.

- Dendromecon Benth. – California.
- Eschscholzia Cham. – Western North America.
- Hunnemannia Sweet – Eastern Mexico.

- Tribe Chelidonieae Dumort.

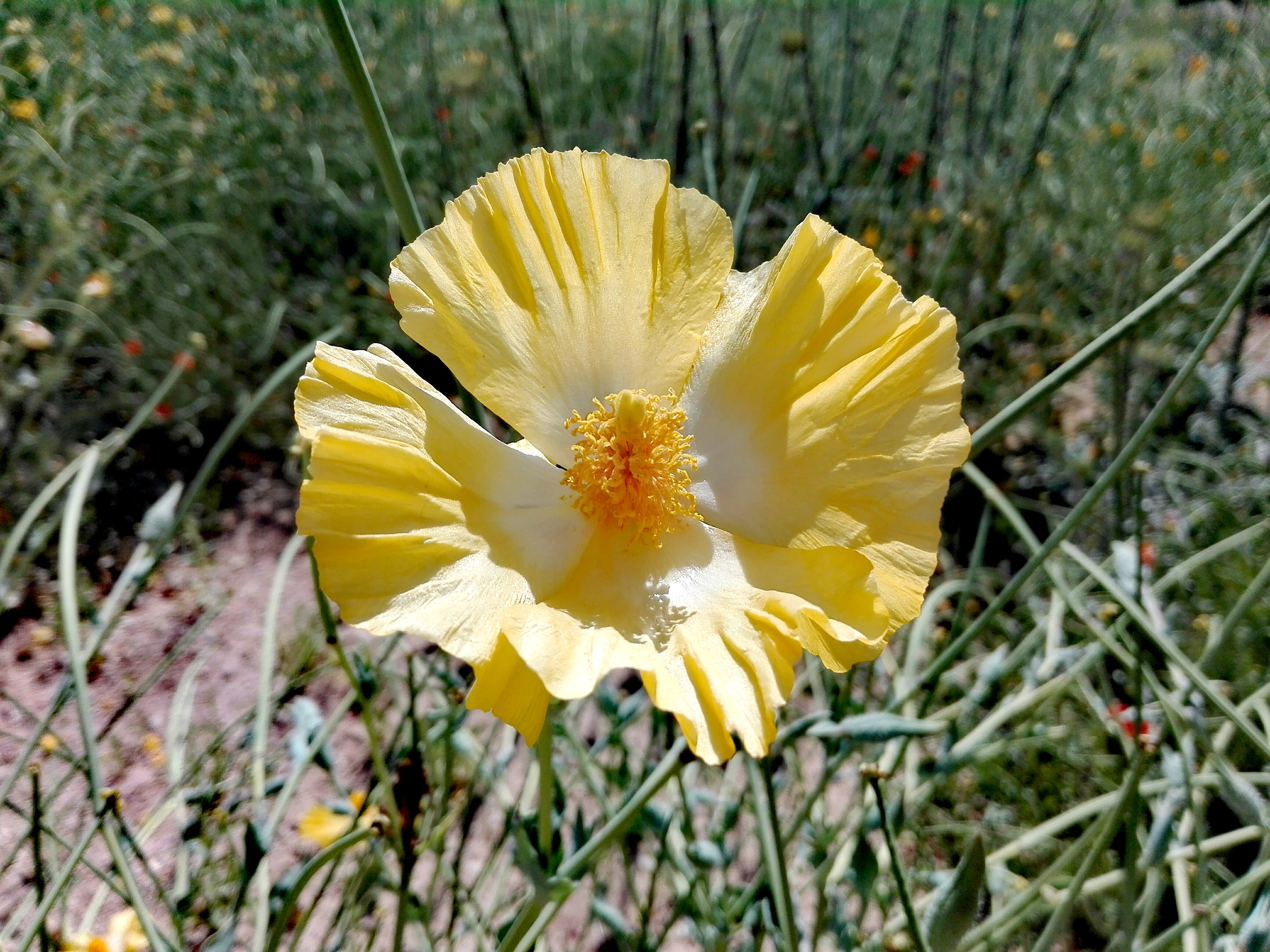
Glaucium vitellinum

- Bocconia L. – Central and southern America, Antilles
- Chelidonium L. – Eurasia
- Dicranostigma Hook.f. & Thomson – Central Asia
- Eomecon Hance – Eastern China
- Glaucium Mill. – Europe to Central Asia
- Hylomecon Maxim. – Eastern Asia
- Macleaya R.Br. – Eastern Asia
- Sanguinaria L. – Eastern North America
- Stylophorum Nutt. – Eastern North America, Eastern Asia

- Tribe Platystemoneae Spach

- Hesperomecon Greene – Western North America
- Meconella Nutt. – Western North America
- Platystemon Benth. – Western North America

- Tribe Papavereae Dumort.

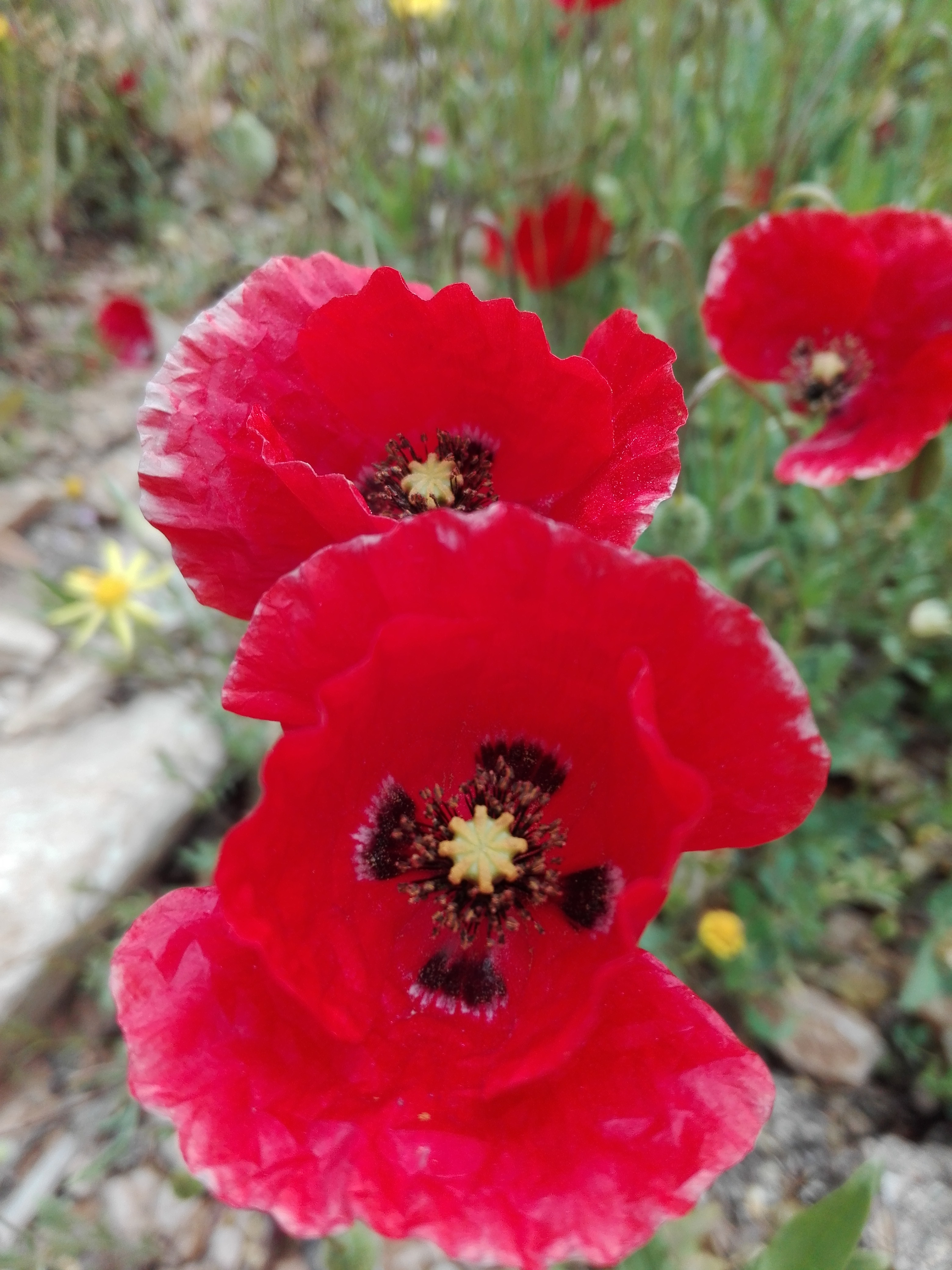
Papaver rhoeas

- Arctomecon Torr. & Frém. – Western North America
- Argemone L. – North America, Antilles, central and southern America, Hawaii
- Canbya Parry – Western North America
- Meconopsis Vig. – Central southern Asia, western Europe; paraphyletic
- Papaver L. – Northern hemisphere, South Africa, Cape Verde; paraphyletic
- Roemeria Medik. – Mediterranean region, south west Asia
- Romneya Harv. – California
- Stylomecon G. Taylor – California

== Bibliography ==
- Kadereit, J.W.; Schwarzbach, A.E.; Jork, K.B. (1997). "The phylogeny of Papaver s.l. (Papaveraceae): polyphyly or monophyly?". Plant Systematics and Evolution. 204 (1–2): 75–98. Bibcode:1997PSyEv.204...75K. doi:10.1007/bf00982533. S2CID 20019969.
