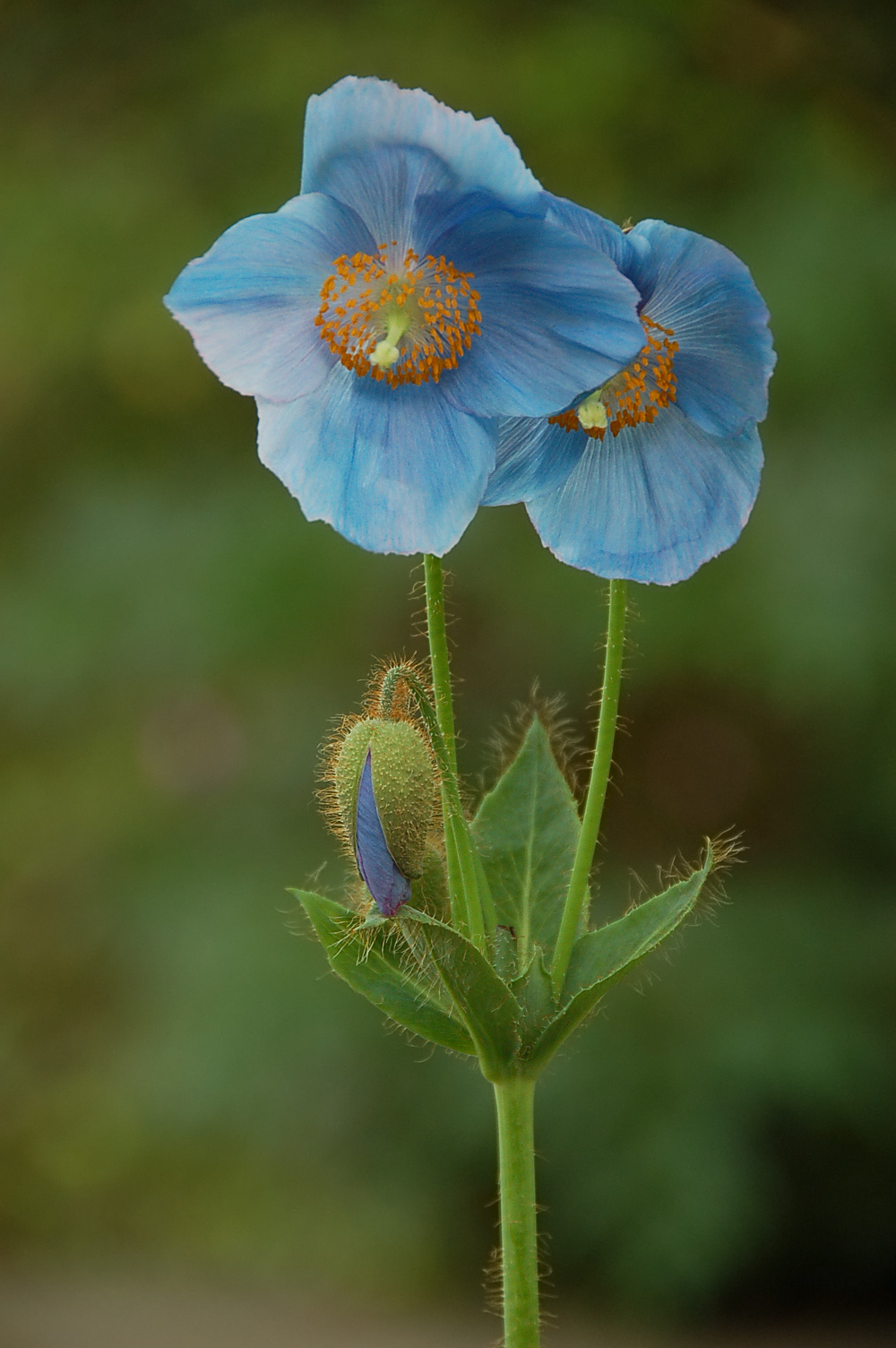
- Blue poppy (Meconopsis sp.)

Scientific classification
- Kingdom: Plantae
- Clade: Embryophytes
- Clade: Tracheophytes
- Clade: Spermatophytes
- Clade: Angiosperms
- Clade: Eudicots
- Order: Ranunculales
- Family: Papaveraceae
- Subfamily: Papaveroideae
- Tribe: Papavereae
- Genus: Meconopsis; Vig.

Type species
- Meconopsis regia G.Taylor (typ. cons.)

Species
- See text.

= Meconopsis =

Genus of flowering plants in the poppy family

Meconopsis is a genus of flowering plants in the poppy family Papaveraceae. It was created by French botanist Viguier in 1814 for the species known by the common name Welsh poppy, which Carl Linnaeus had described as Papaver cambricum. The genus name means "poppy-like" (from Greek mekon poppy, opsis alike). Himalayan species discovered later were also placed in Meconopsis. In the 21st century, it was discovered that the Himalayan species were less closely related to the Welsh poppy, which has been restored to Papaver. All species now placed in Meconopsis are native to the Himalayas and surrounding regions. They have attractive, usually blue flowers.

The taxonomy of Meconopsis remains unsettled. Although many sources recognize the genus, others sink it into Papaver. There is also uncertainty over the number of species, as many readily hybridise with each other producing viable seed. It is likely that some individually named species are in fact a single species but with an under-appreciated morphological diversity.

A large proportion of species are monocarpic and as such are notoriously difficult to maintain in cultivation.

Meconopsis species do not produce opium.

== Taxonomy ==
The genus Meconopsis and its species have a complex taxonomic history. A European species was first described in 1753 by Carl Linnaeus as Papaver cambricum, commonly known as the Welsh poppy. It has a style, while all other then described Papaver species lacked one, having only a "stigmatic disc" (i.e. a disc-shaped region on the top of the ovary receptive to pollen). On the basis of this difference, in 1814, Louis Viguier transferred P. cambricum to his new genus Meconopsis as Meconopsis cambrica, then the only species. Later, when mainly blue-flowered poppy-like species with styles like the Welsh poppy were discovered in the Himalayas and neighbouring regions, they were also placed in the genus Meconopsis. However, molecular phylogenetic studies from 1995 onwards showed that the Welsh poppy was not closely related to the Himalayan species, but rather to Papaver species. In 2011, Kadereit et al. proposed that Linnaeus's original name should be restored. However, as Meconopsis cambrica was the type species of the genus Meconopsis, if the Welsh poppy was moved back to Papaver, all the Himalayan species would have to be placed in this genus as well. In 2012, it was proposed that Meconopsis should become a conserved name, with the new type Meconopsis regia. This proposal has been accepted.

=== Phylogeny ===
Molecular phylogenetic studies have shown that the Old World members of the subfamily Papaveroideae form a monophyletic clade. However, they have sometimes left relationships within this clade unresolved. A 2014 study found that neither Meconopsis nor Papaver were monophyletic. Meconopsis was split into two clades, a large one which the authors called section Eumeconopsis, and a smaller one, Meconopsis sect. Eucathcartia, containing four of the species included in the study.

- - - - - - Clade I – Meconopsis section Eumeconopsis – most Meconopsis species
          - Clade II – Papaver section Meconella
        - Clade III – Papaver section Argemonidium plus Roemeria
        - Clade IV – remaining Papaver species, including P. cambricum, plus Stylomecon
    - Clade V – Meconopsis sect. Eucathcartia – four species in the study

An alternative cladogram resolves Clade III as the sister of Clades I and II. It was suggested that the generic name Meconopsis should be retained for Clade I, and Clade V should be treated as the genus Cathcartia. This would still leave Papaver non-monophyletic. An alternative approach, adopted by Plants of the World Online and since largely reversed, was to sink Meconopsis, Roemeria, Stylomecon and Cathcartia into Papaver.

=== Sections ===
In 2017, Xiao and Simpson raised Meconopsis sect. Eucathcartia (Clade V) to the genus Cathcartia. On the basis of a further molecular phylogenetic study they divided Meconopsis into four sections.

- Meconopsis sect. Meconopsis

- Meconopsis autumnalis P.A.Egan
- Meconopsis chankheliensis Grey-Wilson
- Meconopsis dhwojii G.Taylor
- Meconopsis discigera Prain
- Meconopsis ganeshensis Grey-Wilson
- Meconopsis gracilipes G.Taylor
- Meconopsis manasluensis P A.Egan
- Meconopsis napaulensis DC.
- Meconopsis paniculata Prain
- Meconopsis pinnatifolia C.Y.Wu & H.Chuang ex L.H.Zhou
- Meconopsis regia G.Taylor
- Meconopsis robusta Hook.f. & Thomson
- Meconopsis simikotensis Grey-Wilson
- Meconopsis staintonii Grey-Wilson
- Meconopsis superba King ex Prain
- Meconopsis taylorii L.H.J.Williams
- Meconopsis tibetica Grey-Wilson
- Meconopsis torquata Prain
- Meconopsis violacea Kingdon-Ward
- Meconopsis wallichii Hook.
- Meconopsis wilsonii Grey-Wilson

- Meconopsis sect. Aculeatae Fedde

- Meconopsis aculeata Royle
- Meconopsis bikramii Aswal (doubtfully placed here)
- Meconopsis concinna Prain
- Meconopsis delavayi Franch. Ex Prain
- Meconopsis forrestii Prain
- Meconopsis georgei G.Taylor
- Meconopsis henrici Bureau & Franch.
- Meconopsis horridula Hook.f. & Thomson
- Meconopsis impedita Prain
- Meconopsis lancifolia Franch.
- Meconopsis latifolia Prain
- Meconopsis muscicola Tosh.Yoshida, H.Sun & Boufford
- Meconopsis neglecta G.Taylor
- Meconopsis pseudovenusta G.Taylor
- Meconopsis pulchella Tosh.Yoshida, H.Sun & Bouford
- Meconopsis venusta Prain
- Meconopsis yaoshanensis Tosh.Yoshida, H.Sun & Boufford

- Meconopsis sect. Primulinae Fedde

- Meconopsis argemonantha Prain
- Meconopsis bella Prain
- Meconopsis florindae Kingdon-Ward
- Meconopsis lyrata (H.A.Cummins & Prain) Fedde
- Meconopsis primulina Prain
- Meconopsis sinuata Prain
- Meconopsis wumungensis K.M.Feng
- Meconopsis zang-nanensis L.H.Zhou

- Meconopsis sect. Grandes Fedde

- Meconopsis betonicifolia Franch.
- Meconopsis biloba L.Z.An, Shu Y.Chen & Y.S.Lian
- Meconopsis grandis Prain
- Meconopsis integrifolia (Maxim.) Franch.
- Meconopsis punicea Maxim.
- Meconopsis quintuplinervia Regel
- Meconopsis simplicifolia (D.Don) Walp.
- Meconopsis sherriffii G.Taylor

A further species was described after Xiao and Simpson's classification:

- Meconopsis gakyidiana Tosh.Yoshida, Yangzom & D.G.Long

Xiao and Simpson placed four former Meconopsis species in the genus Cathcartia:

- Cathcartia chelidonifolia (Bureau & Franch.) Grey-Wilson = Meconopsis chelidoniifolia Bureau & Franch.
- Cathcartia oliveriana (Franch. ex Prain) Grey-Wilson = Meconopsis oliveriana Franch. ex Prain
- Cathcartia smithiana Hand.-Mazz. = Meconopsis smithiana (Hand.-Mazz.) G.Taylor ex Hand.-Mazz.
- Cathcartia villosa Hook.f. = Meconopsis villosa (Hook.f.) G.Taylor

== Cultivation ==
Himalayan varieties have the reputation for being difficult to grow from seed, but when germinating new plants, using fresh seeds will help. These plants are available in a variety of strong colours, including blue, red, orange, purple, white and yellow depending on species and cultivar.

All meconopsis require an acid or neutral soil pH, in a partially shaded sheltered position.

=== Cultivars ===
The following cultivars, of mixed or uncertain heritage, have won the Royal Horticultural Society's Award of Garden Merit:-

- 'Bobby Masterton' (Infertile Blue Group)
- 'Dalemain' (George Sherriff Group)
- 'Keillour'
- 'Marit'
- 'Mop-Head' (Fertile Blue Group)
- 'Mrs Jebb' (Infertile Blue Group)
- 'P.C. Abildgaard' (Infertile Blue Group)
- 'Slieve Donard' (Infertile Blue Group)
- 'Susan's Reward' (George Sherriff Group)

=== Pests and diseases ===
In the United Kingdom, Meconopsis has been affected by the invasive golden root mealybug. Damping off may occur on seedling grown plants.
