= Meconopsis villosa =

Scientific classification
- Kingdom: Plantae
- Clade: Embryophytes
- Clade: Tracheophytes
- Clade: Spermatophytes
- Clade: Angiosperms
- Clade: Eudicots
- Order: Ranunculales
- Family: Papaveraceae
- Genus: Meconopsis
- Species: M. villosa

Binomial name
- Meconopsis villosa (Hook.f. ex Hook.) G.Taylor

Synonyms
- Cathcartia villosa Hook.f. ex Hook.

Species of flowering plant in the poppy family

Meconopsis villosa, the Himalayan woodland-poppy, is an ornamental poppy, which is native of Nepal. The species was placed in the genus Cathcartia erected by J.D. Hooker to honour J.F. Cathcart, an Indian civil servant and amateur botanist who collected and hired native artists to illustrate the flowers of the Himalayas. It was transferred to Meconopsis by George Taylor in 1934. In 2017, it was suggested that the genus Cathcartia should be revived, and this species again treated as Cathcartia villosa.
