= Arboretum at the University of California, Santa Cruz =

Arboretum in Santa Cruz, California

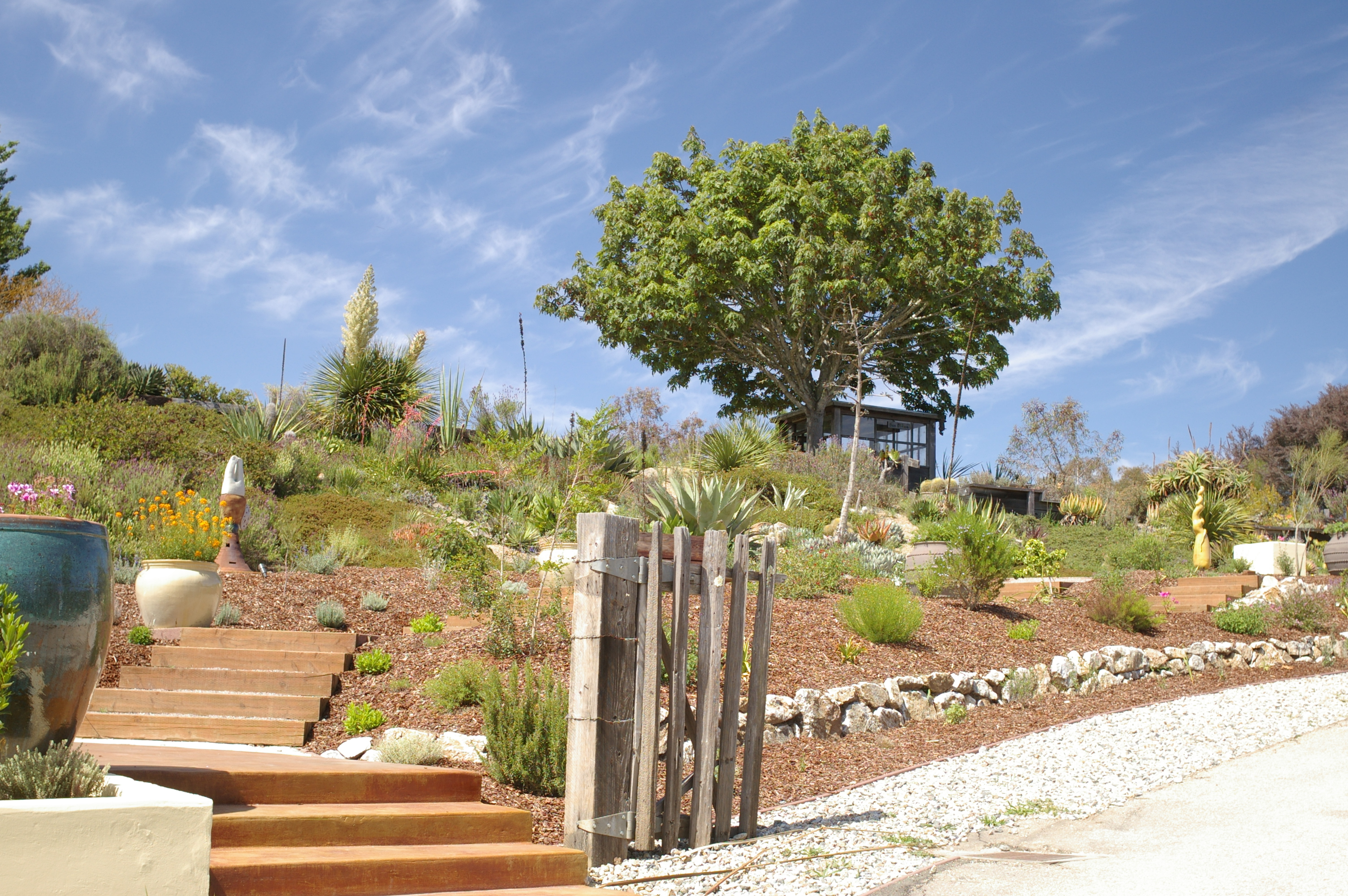

- Location within California Location within the United States
- Interactive map of Arboretum at the University of California, Santa Cruz
- Type: Botanical garden
- Location: 1156 High St, Santa Cruz, California 95064
- Coordinates: 36°58′57.75″N 122°3′41.11″W
- Operator: University of California Santa Cruz
- Status: Open year round
- Website: arboretum.ucsc.edu

The Arboretum & Botanic Garden at the University of California, Santa Cruz, is located on the campus of the University of California, Santa Cruz, in the United States. The garden is set over some 115 acres and includes over 300 rare plant species.

== Description ==
The Arboretum site has remarkable climatic and topographic diversity and a wide variety of soils, since the underlying rocks include granite, schist, limestone, and several sandstones. The Arboretum officially started in 1964, when the UCSC campus was established, with about 90 species of eucalyptus. Its gradual expansion has focused mainly on mediterranean-climate plants of the Southern Hemisphere, and now includes a comprehensive collection of conifers, exotic South African proteas, Australian and New Zealand plants, and a fine collection of native Californian shrubs and trees.

== Major collections ==
- Australian Garden – over 2,000 species, forms, and cultivars (out of some 20,000 species native to the subcontinent), and believed to be the largest collection of Australian plants outside Australia. The gardens include many acacias; many members of the fragrant myrtle family such as Eucalyptus, Callistemon, Melaleuca, and Leptospermum; members of the Protea family; Grevilleas; Banksias; and waratah (Telopea speciosissima). The Elvenia J. Slosson Research Gardens (1978) support testing of new Australian ornamentals.
- California Garden – Most noteworthy are the ponderosa pines, along with coast redwoods, Douglas firs, coast live oaks, California bays, willows, cottonwoods, madrones, and buckeyes. Other popular plants include Epilobium (formerly Zauschneria), bush anemone (Carpenteria californica), California lilacs (Ceanothus spp.), monkeyflowers (Diplacus spp.), buckwheats (Eriogonum spp.), woolly blue curls (Trichostema lanatum), salvias, and flannelbush or Fremontia (Fremontodendron spp.). The Arboretum also contains an extensive collection of native bulbs, and several rare Channel Island plants including the Santa Cruz Island bush mallow (Malacothamnus fasciculatus var. nesioticus), island barberry (Berberis pinnata ssp. insularis), and bush poppy (Dendromecon spp.). The collection also emphasizes plants native to the Santa Cruz Mountains and the Santa Lucia Mountains in Monterey County, including the endangered Santa Cruz Cypress (Cupressus abramsiana) and the rare Santa Lucia fir (Abies bracteata).
- South African Gardea – A variety of Proteaceae, including Leucadendrons such as the silver tree (Leucadendron argenteum), Leucospermum, and one of the largest collections of members of the genus Erica (Cape heaths) outside South Africa.
- Edward D. Landels New Zealand Garden – dedicated in 1984, the garden includes Lily Family members, New Zealand flax (phormiums), pittosporum trees, the manuka or tea tree (Leptospermum scoparium), and a young kauri forest.
- Eucalyptus Grove – mainly specimens donated by Max Watson, including species rare in nature or in California plantings.
- Conifers – A particularly good collection, representing nearly all known genera of conifers, with the exception of a genus unknown outside of China and a parasitic New Caledonian genus.
- Primitive Flowering Plants – A one-of-a-kind collection of "living fossils" among flowering plants, of great interest for the study of evolution.
- Aroma Garden – many mints, salvias, lavenders, oregano, thymes, and other drought-tolerant perennials and shrubs.
- Rare Fruit Exhibit – unusual fruit-bearing plants.
- Laurasian Forest – various interesting North American plants, particularly high-altitude Mexican species.
- Cactus & Succulent Garden – with many plants from the collections of Victor Reiter, noted plant breeder.
- South American – materials of instructional value, planted beside the New Zealand Garden for comparison to New Zealand and Chilean flora.

== Gallery ==
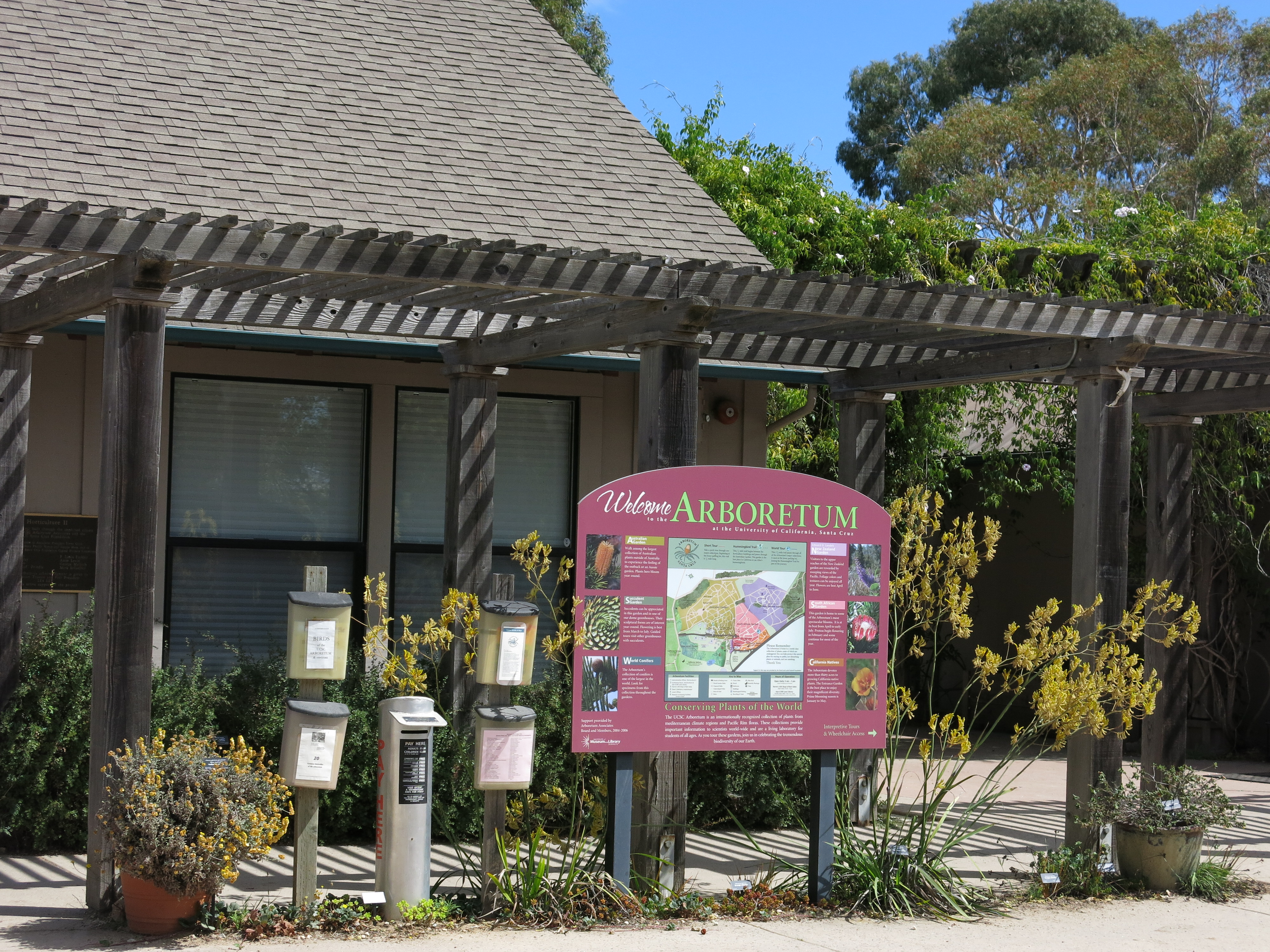

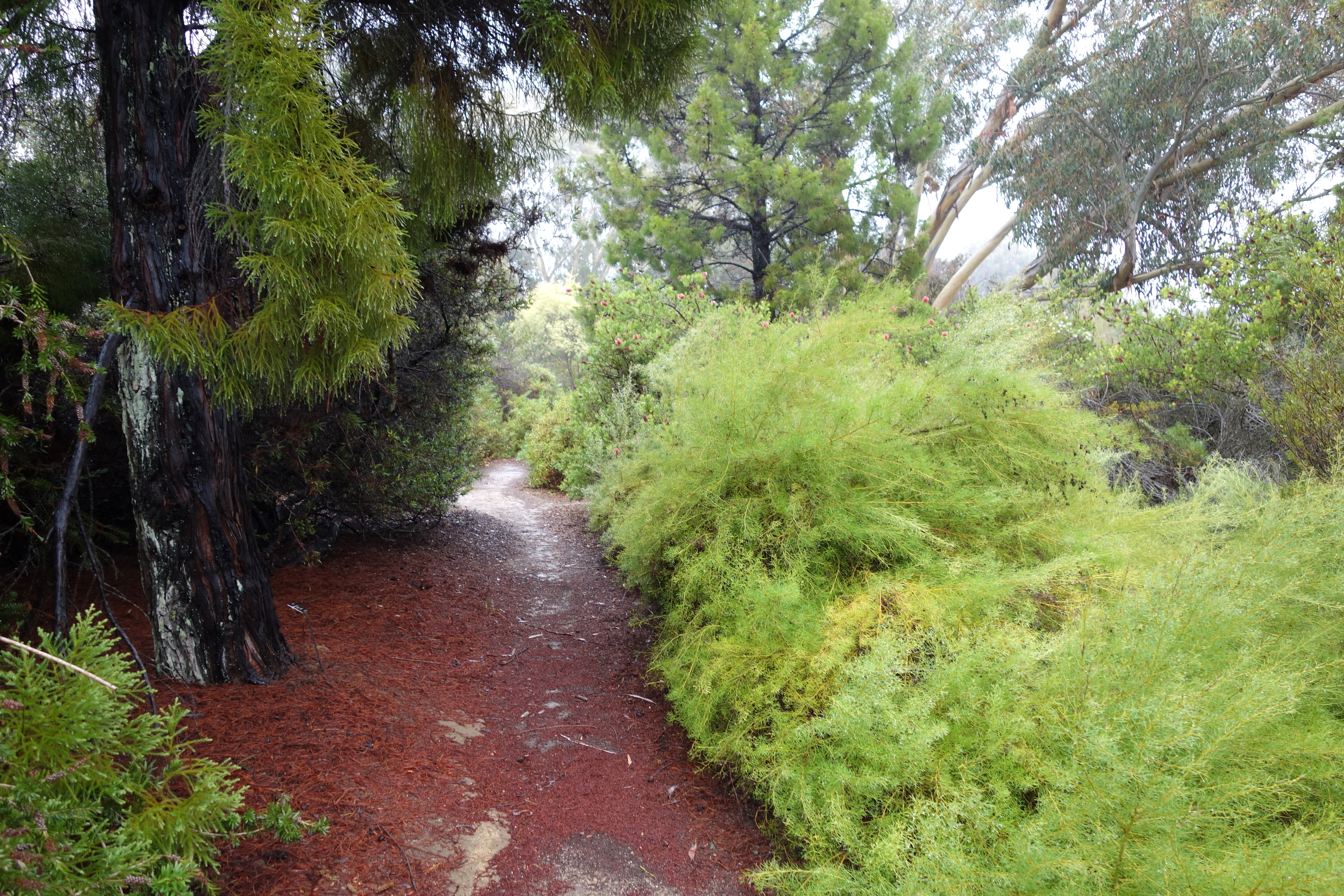

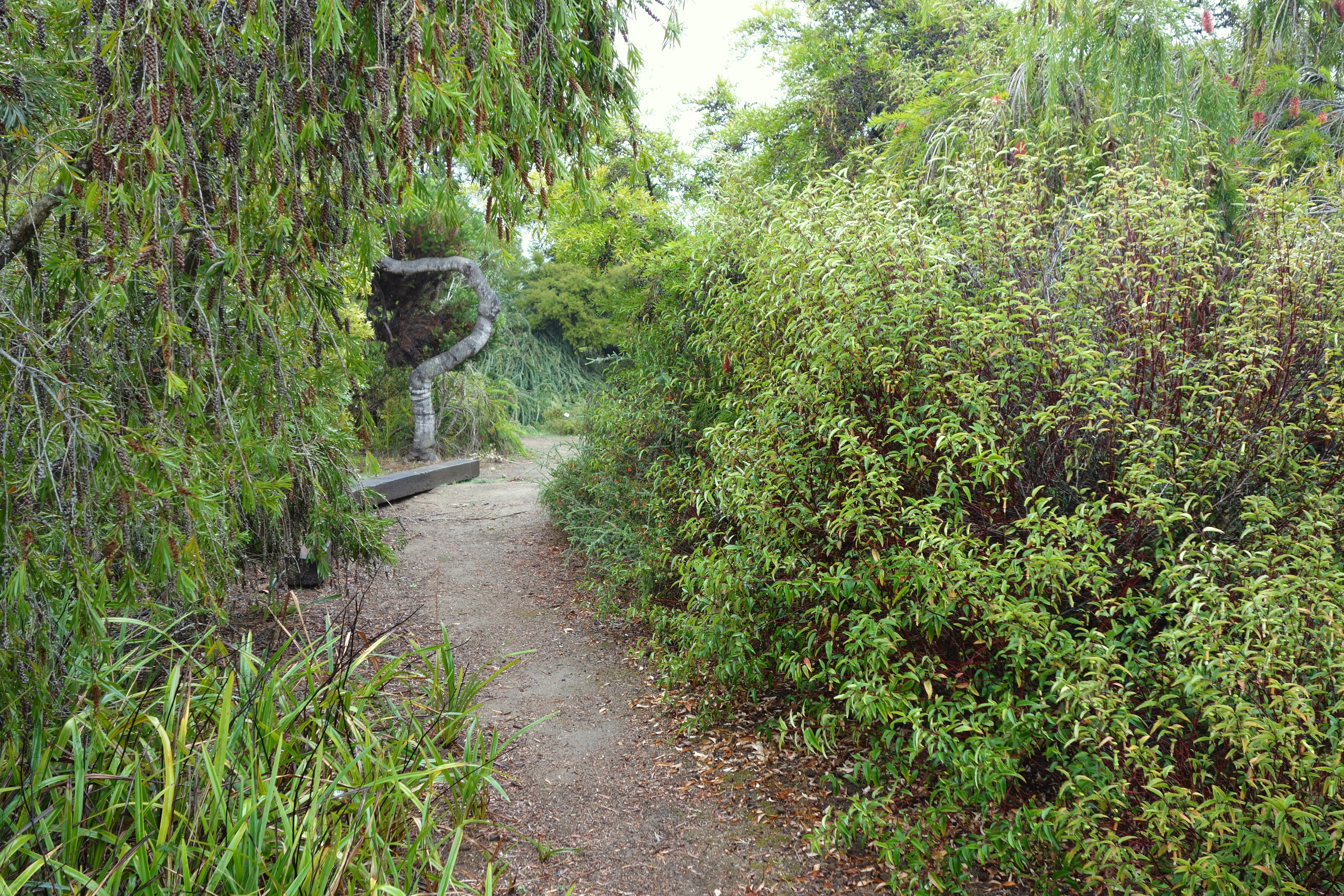

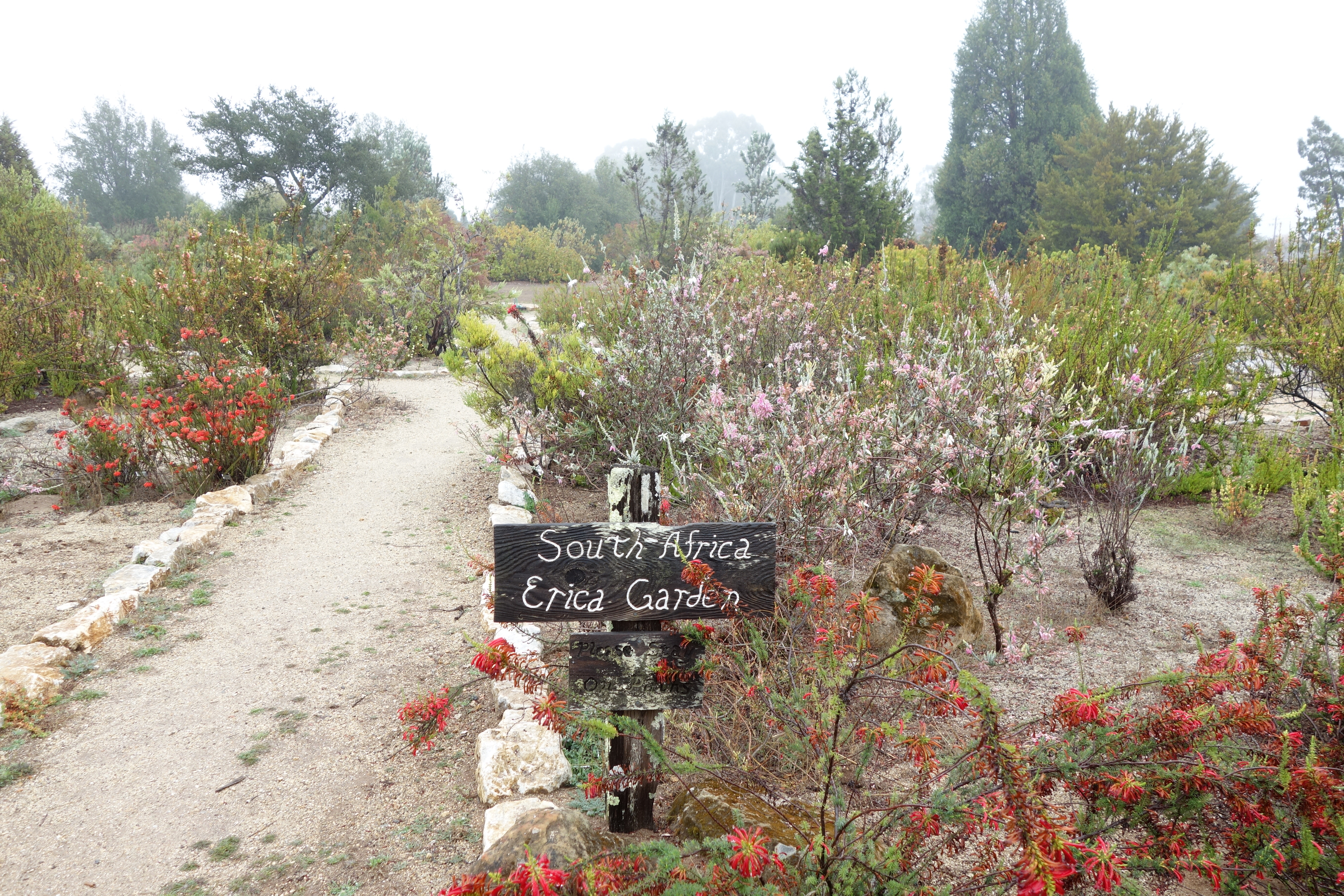

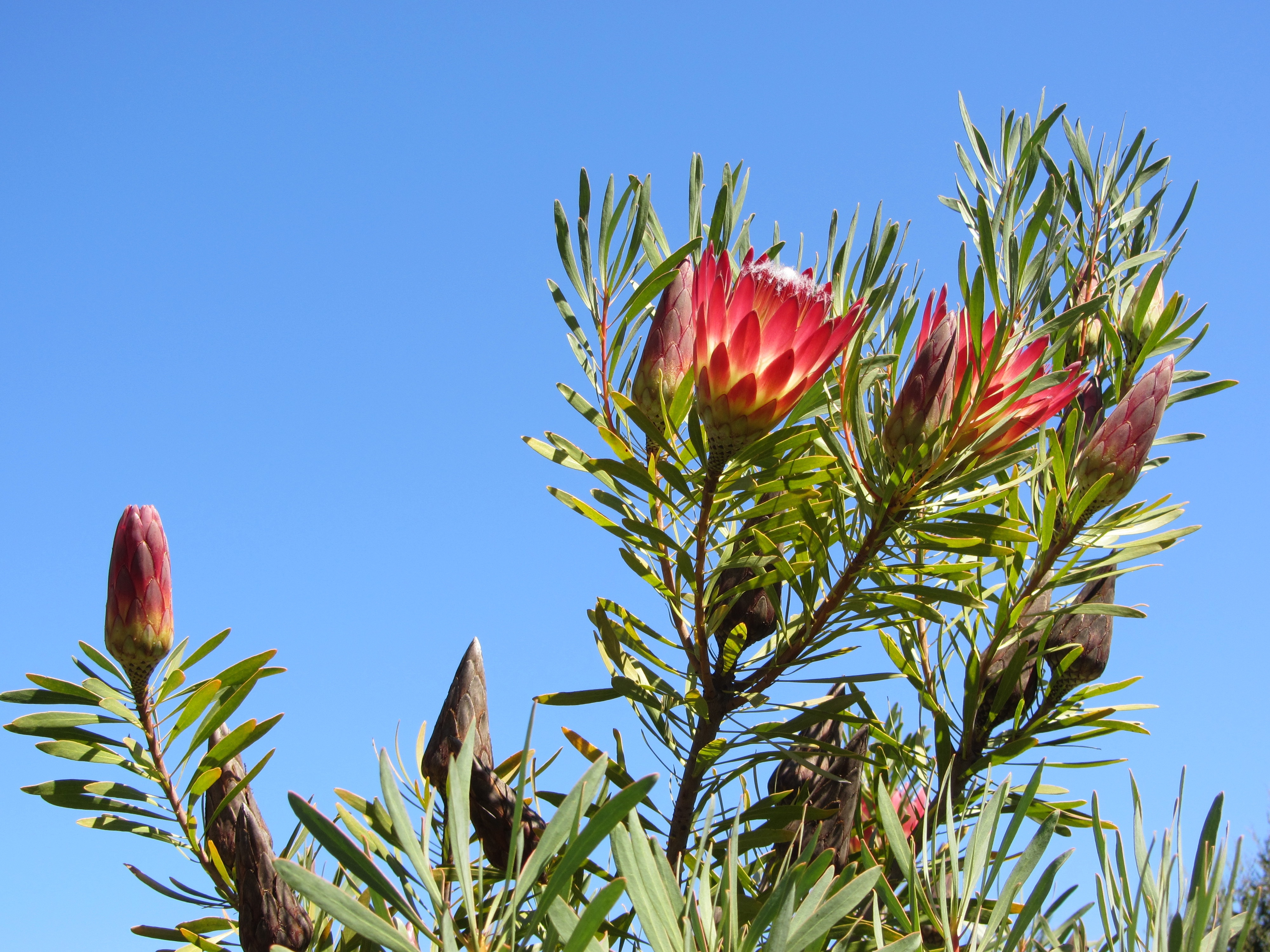

== See also ==
- List of botanical gardens in the United States
