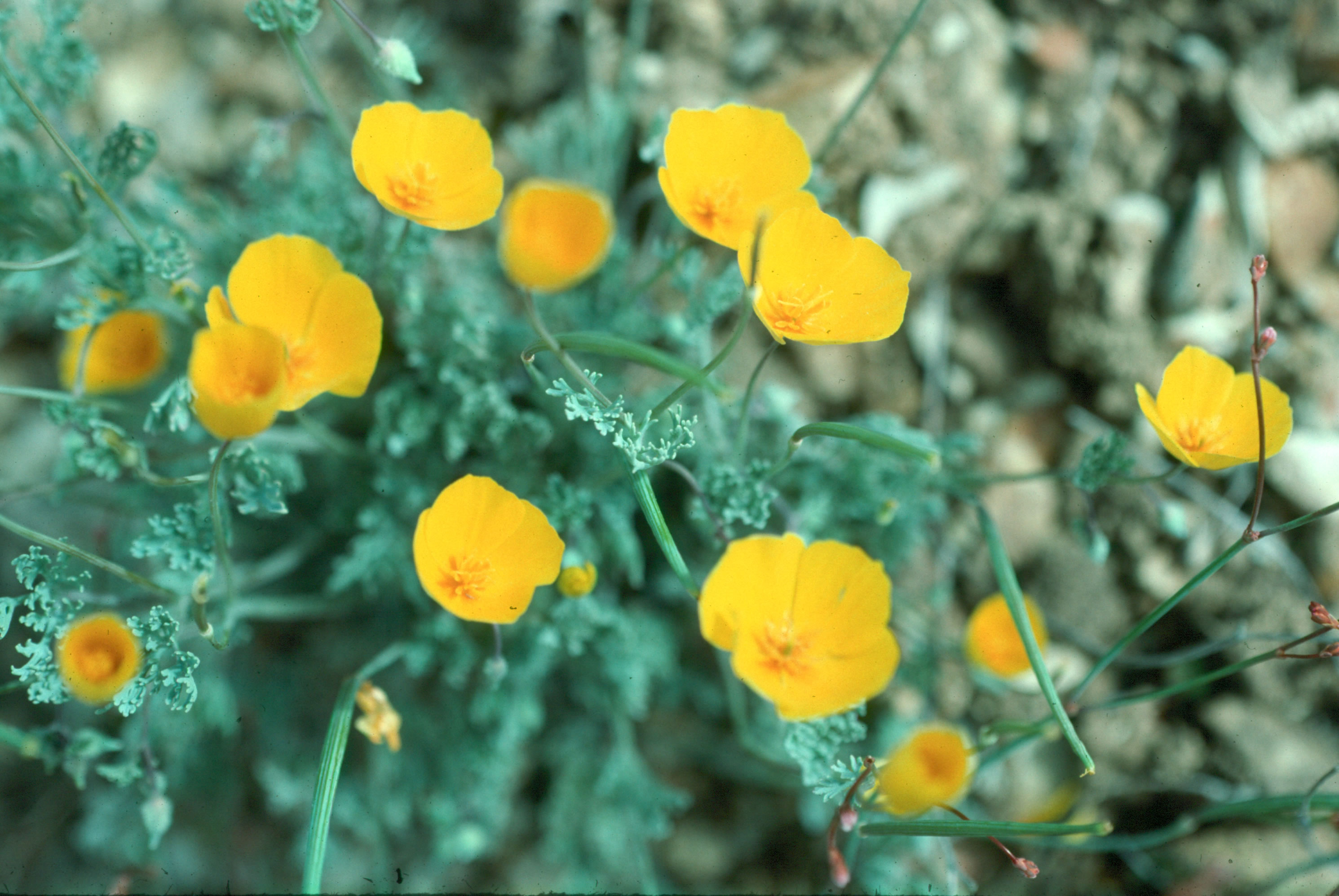

Scientific classification
- Kingdom: Plantae
- Clade: Tracheophytes
- Clade: Angiosperms
- Clade: Eudicots
- Order: Ranunculales
- Family: Papaveraceae
- Genus: Eschscholzia
- Species: E. hypecoides

Binomial name
- Eschscholzia hypecoides Benth.

= Eschscholzia hypecoides =

Species of flowering plant

Eschscholzia hypecoides is a species of poppy known by the common name San Benito poppy.

== Distribution ==
The wildflower is endemic to California where it is mainly limited to the Inner Southern California Coast Ranges, in and around San Benito County. It is a plant of oak woodlands, grassland slopes, and chaparral habitats.

This wildflower was once considered a variety of the endemic tufted poppy (Eschscholzia caespitosa).

== Description ==
Eschscholzia hypecoides is an annual herb with leaves made up of rounded segments and producing fuzzy stems up to 30 centimeters tall.

Atop the thin, erect stems are bright yellow to orange poppy flowers. Each flower has petals one or two centimeters long and sometimes spotted with a darker shade of yellow or orange.

The fruit is a capsule 3 to 7 centimeters long containing tiny netted brown seeds.
