= Tree poppy =

Tree poppy is a name used for various plants in the family Papaveraceae:

- Genus Dendromecon
- Genus Romneya
- Bocconia frutescens
