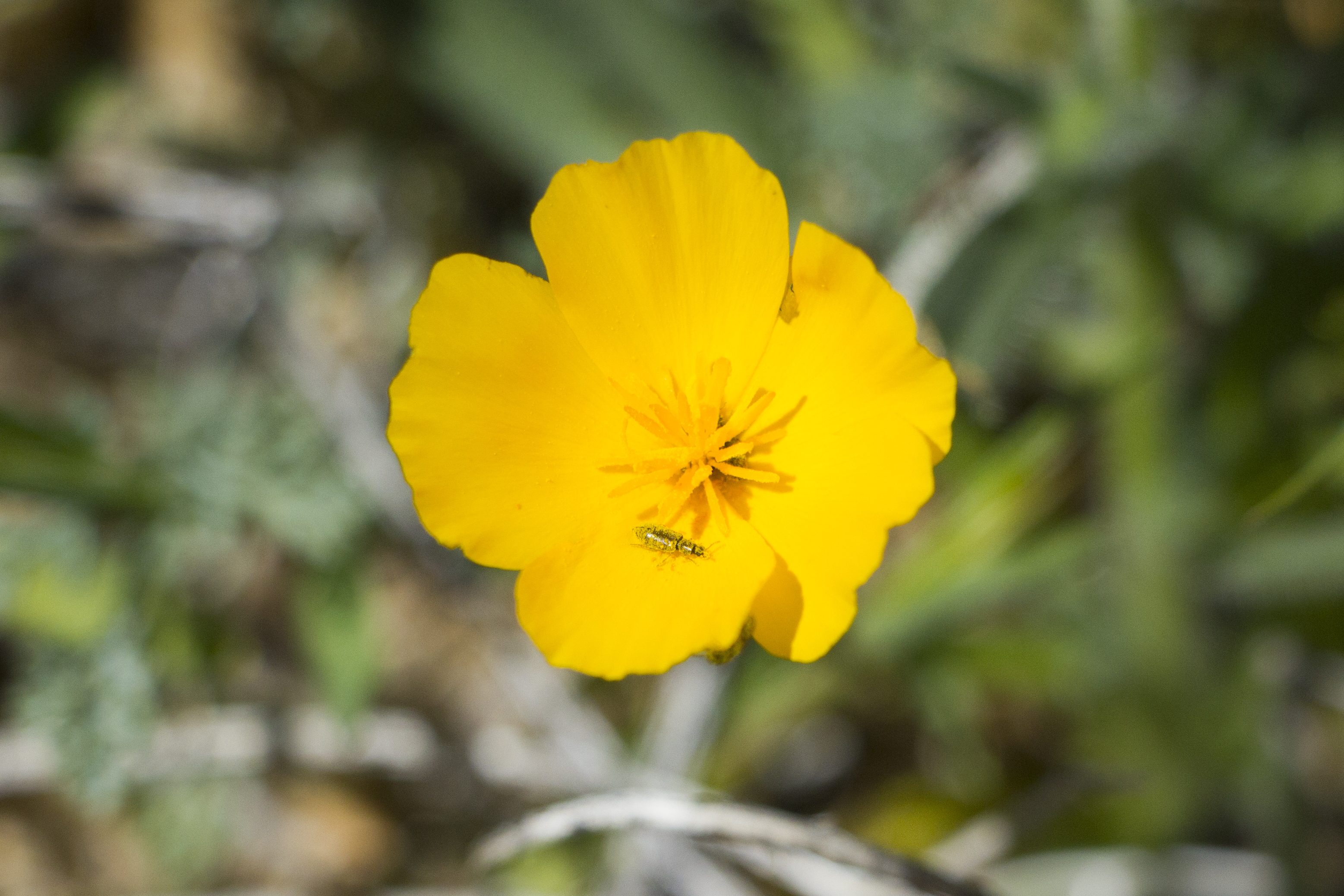

Scientific classification
- Kingdom: Plantae
- Clade: Tracheophytes
- Clade: Angiosperms
- Clade: Eudicots
- Order: Ranunculales
- Family: Papaveraceae
- Genus: Eschscholzia
- Species: E. androuxii

Binomial name
- Eschscholzia androuxii Still

= Eschscholzia androuxii =

Species of flowering plant

Eschscholzia androuxii is a species of poppy known by the common name Joshua Tree poppy.

The plant is endemic to the counties of Riverside and San Bernardino in Southern California (United States).

It is found in desert habitats.

== Description ==
Eschscholzia androuxii is an annual wildflower growing from a clump of foliage made up of segmented leaves with deep divisions.

The erect stalks grow up to 35 centimeters tall. They bear poppy flowers with yellow petals 10-25 millimeters long, with a distinctive dark spot at the base of the filaments (under the flower). The fruit is a capsule 4 to 7 centimeters long containing tiny net-ridged black seeds.

Many of the larger-flowered collections identified as Eschscholzia minutiflora subsp. covillei may actually be Eschscholzia androuxii.

== Sources ==
- "Eschscholzia androuxii". Jepson eFlora, Revision 12. University of California.
