= Eschscholzia elegans =

Scientific classification
- Kingdom: Plantae
- Clade: Tracheophytes
- Clade: Angiosperms
- Clade: Eudicots
- Order: Ranunculales
- Family: Papaveraceae
- Genus: Eschscholzia
- Species: E. elegans

Binomial name
- Eschscholzia elegans Greene

Species of flowering plant

Eschscholzia elegans is a relative of the California poppy that occurs on Guadalupe and Cedros islands, off the coast of the Baja California peninsula.

Although many of the specimens given its name are actually Eschscholzia ramosa, its type specimen and a few other specimens have very different seeds, and may be more closely related to Eschscholzia palmeri.
