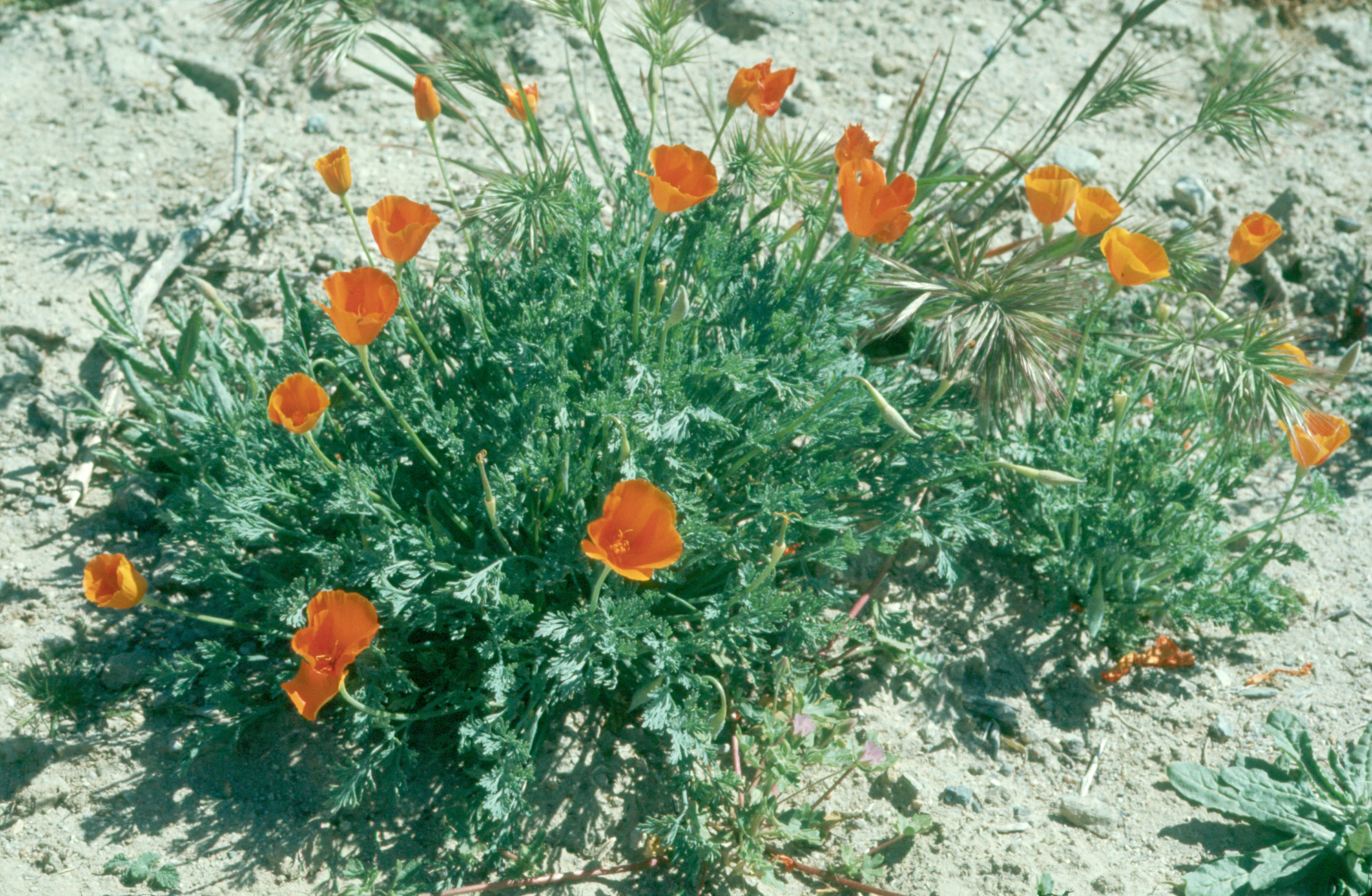

Scientific classification
- Kingdom: Plantae
- Clade: Tracheophytes
- Clade: Angiosperms
- Clade: Eudicots
- Order: Ranunculales
- Family: Papaveraceae
- Genus: Eschscholzia
- Species: E. lemmonii

Binomial name
- Eschscholzia lemmonii Greene

= Eschscholzia lemmonii =

Species of flowering plant

Eschscholzia lemmonii is a species of poppy known by the common name Lemmon's poppy.

It is endemic to California, where its distribution includes the Coast Ranges, Sierra Nevada foothills, and Transverse Ranges. One subspecies, the Tejon poppy, ssp. kernensis, is limited to the mountains of Kern County surrounding the Grapevine. This wildflower is an annual herb growing from a patch of segmented leaves made up of round-edged leaflets. The erect stalks grow up to 30 centimeters tall and bear orange or dark yellow poppy flowers. The fruit is a capsule 3 to 7 centimeters long containing tiny netted brown seeds.
