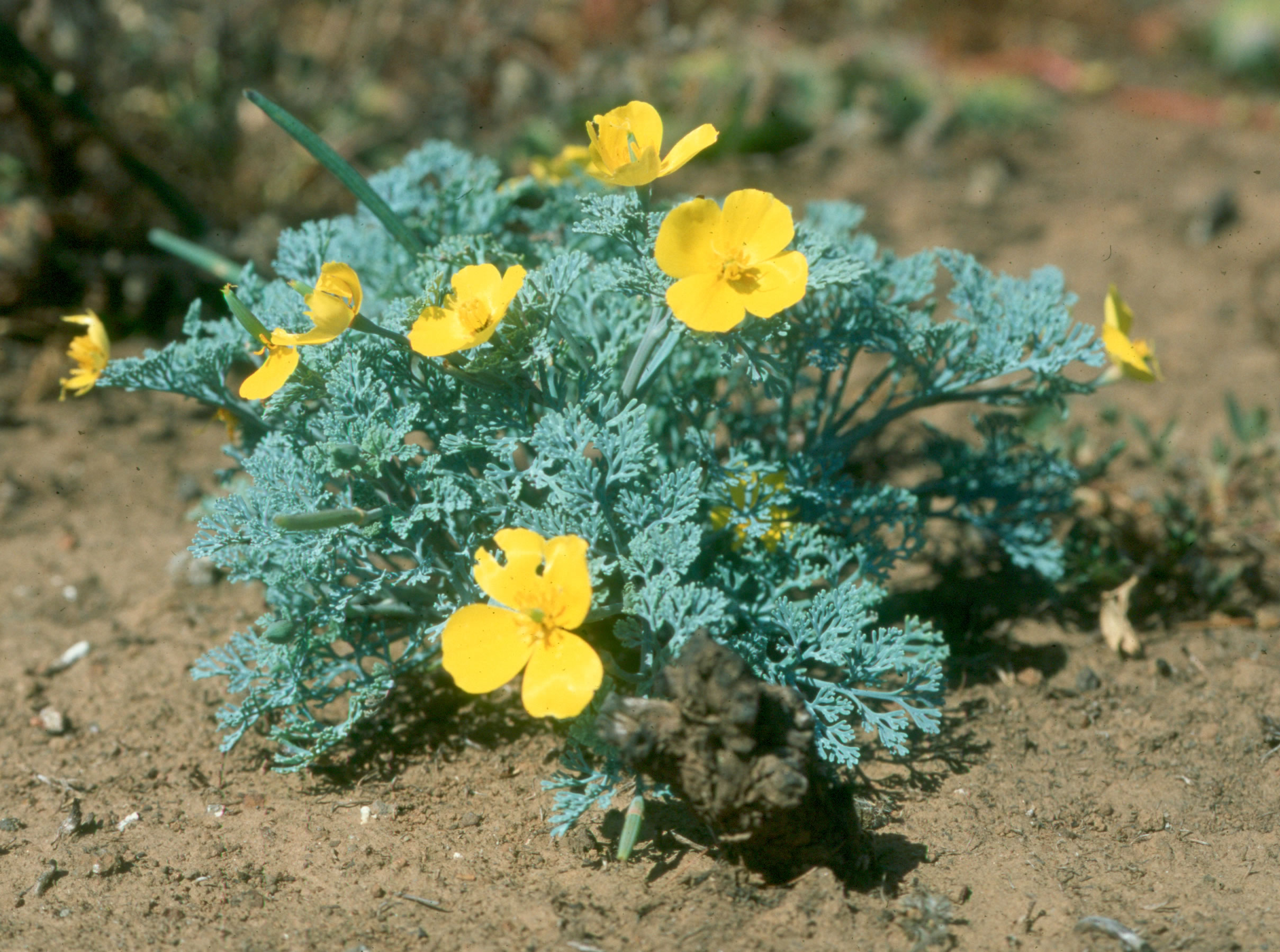

Scientific classification
- Kingdom: Plantae
- Clade: Tracheophytes
- Clade: Angiosperms
- Clade: Eudicots
- Order: Ranunculales
- Family: Papaveraceae
- Genus: Eschscholzia
- Species: E. ramosa

Binomial name
- Eschscholzia ramosa Greene

= Eschscholzia ramosa =

Species of flowering plant

Eschscholzia ramosa is a species of poppy known by the common name Channel Islands poppy, or simply island poppy.

The plant is endemic to the Channel Islands of California off the Southern California coast (United States), and to Guadalupe Island off the western coast of Baja California state (Mexico).

It is usually found in chaparral habitats.

== Description ==
Eschscholzia ramosa is an annual wildflower growing from a clump of foliage made up of segmented leaves with divided, rounded leaflets.

The erect stalks grow up to 30 centimeters tall. They bear poppy flowers with yellow petals one half to two centimeters long, often with orange spots near the bases. The fruit is a capsule 4 to 7 centimeters long containing tiny netted brown seeds.

Many of the collections identified as Eschscholzia elegans are actually Eschscholzia ramosa.
