= Eschscholzieae =

Scientific classification
- Kingdom: Plantae
- Clade: Tracheophytes
- Clade: Angiosperms
- Clade: Eudicots
- Order: Ranunculales
- Family: Papaveraceae
- Subfamily: Papaveroideae
- Tribe: Eschscholzieae

Genera
- Eschscholzia; Dendromecon; Hunnemannia

Tribe of plants

Eschscholzieae is a tribe of about 20 species of plants in the family Papaveraceae.
