= Eschscholzia papastillii =

Scientific classification
- Kingdom: Plantae
- Clade: Tracheophytes
- Clade: Angiosperms
- Clade: Eudicots
- Order: Ranunculales
- Family: Papaveraceae
- Genus: Eschscholzia
- Species: E. papastillii

Binomial name
- Eschscholzia papastillii Still

Species of flowering plant

Eschscholzia papastillii is a species of poppy known by the common names Mojave poppy or cryptic desert poppy.

It is found in desert habitats. The plant ranges from the northern Mojave, south through Joshua Tree National Park to San Diego County.

== Description ==
Eschscholzia papastillii is an annual wildflower growing from a taprooted clump of foliage made up of segmented leaves with deep divisions.

The erect stalks grow up to 40 centimeters tall. They bear nodding buds developing into yellow poppy flowers with petals 5-20 millimeters long. The fruit is a capsule 4 to 8 centimeters long containing tiny net-ridged black seeds.

== Sources ==
- "Eschscholzia papastillii". Jepson eFlora, Revision 12. University of California.
- Still, Shannon M. (2021), A Profusion of Poppy Confusion

‌
