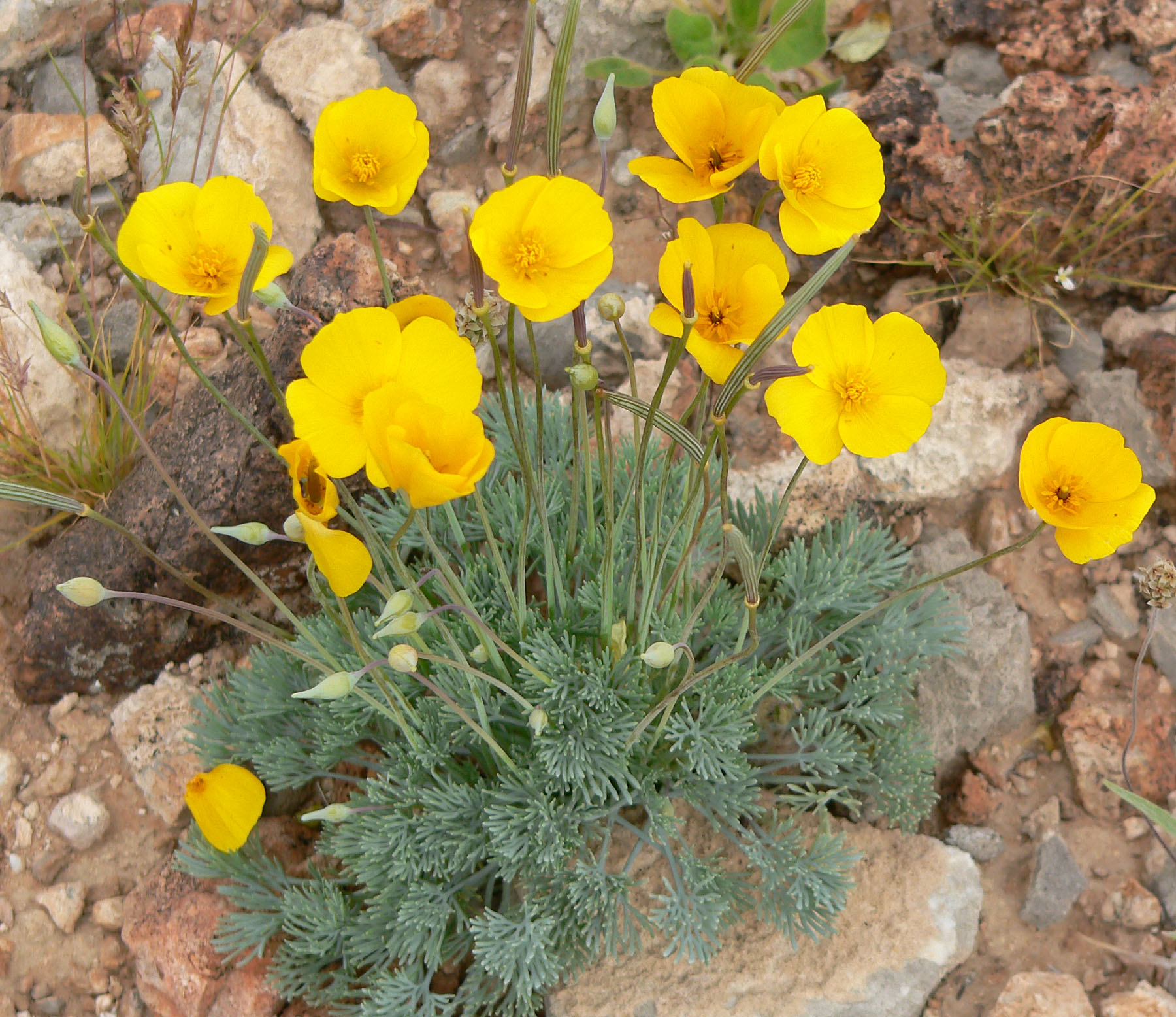

Scientific classification
- Kingdom: Plantae
- Clade: Tracheophytes
- Clade: Angiosperms
- Clade: Eudicots
- Order: Ranunculales
- Family: Papaveraceae
- Genus: Eschscholzia
- Species: E. glyptosperma

Binomial name
- Eschscholzia glyptosperma Greene

= Eschscholzia glyptosperma =

Species of flowering plant

Eschscholzia glyptosperma is a species of poppy known by the common names desert gold poppy, desert golden poppy, and Mojave poppy.

It is native to the Mojave Desert and Sonoran Deserts of the Southwestern United States, in California, southern Nevada, western Arizona, and southwestern Utah. It is found in desert washes, flats, and slopes, at elevations of 30–1,600 metres (98–5,249 ft).

== Distribution ==
Eschscholzia glyptosperma is an annual herb growing from a basal patch of leaves divided into pointed segments.

It produces erect stems up to about 25 centimeters (10 in) in height, each bearing a single flower. The poppy flower is bright yellow, with petals one to two and a half centimeters long. It blooms from March to May.

The fruit is a capsule 4 to 7 centimeters long filled with tiny rounded brown seeds.

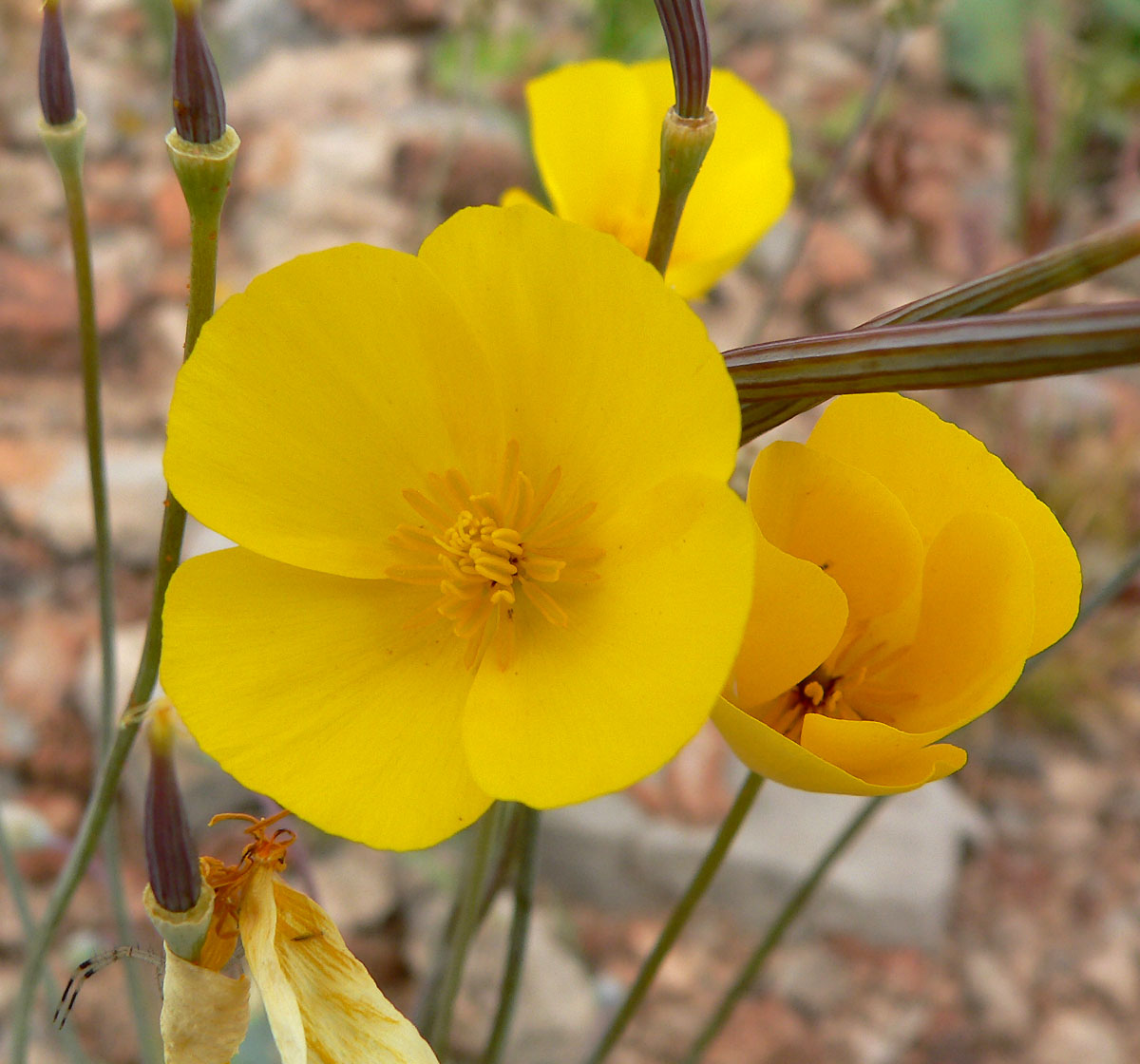
E. glyptosperma, near Las Vegas, Nevada
