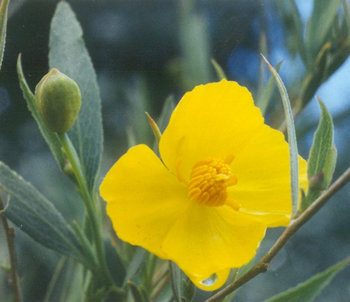

Conservation status
- Apparently Secure (NatureServe)

Scientific classification
- Kingdom: Plantae
- Clade: Tracheophytes
- Clade: Angiosperms
- Clade: Eudicots
- Order: Ranunculales
- Family: Papaveraceae
- Genus: Dendromecon
- Species: D. rigida

Binomial name
- Dendromecon rigida Benth.

= Dendromecon rigida =

Species of tree

Dendromecon rigida, also called bush poppy or tree poppy, is a shrub or small tree of the Papaveraceae native to California and Baja California. It is a chaparral species that tends to appear and germinates after fires. Its seeds are spread through ants and insects that move the seeds throughout the ground.

== Taxonomy ==
Dendromecon rigida was first described by George Bentham, a botanist, in 1835. The genus name stems from the Greek alphabet, with dendron meaning 'tree' and mekon meaning 'poppy.' Rigida is Latin for 'stiff,' and describes the plant's own stiff leaves.

Bush poppy is also a relative of the California Poppy, Eschscholzia californica. Both are also in a family that includes the Mexican tulip poppy, Hunnemannia. Studies of plant DNA have shown that these three groups are considered separate genus.

== Distribution and habitat ==
Dendromecon rigida occurs in Northern California in the foothills of the California Coast Ranges, Klamath Mountains, southwest Cascade Range, and western Sierra Nevada in the Montane and Interior chaparral and woodlands and other habitats.

It is found in the foothills of the Transverse Ranges and Peninsular Ranges and in other areas, in Interior and Montane chaparral and woodlands and other habitats, in Southern California and northern Baja California Peninsula.

The plants occur in these regions up to 1,800 metres (5,910 ft) in elevation. Plants grow on mainly dry slopes and prefer areas that have just been burned. The plant grows at a large range, between Sonoma County all the way through the Coastal ranges, and further down in Baja California.

== Description ==
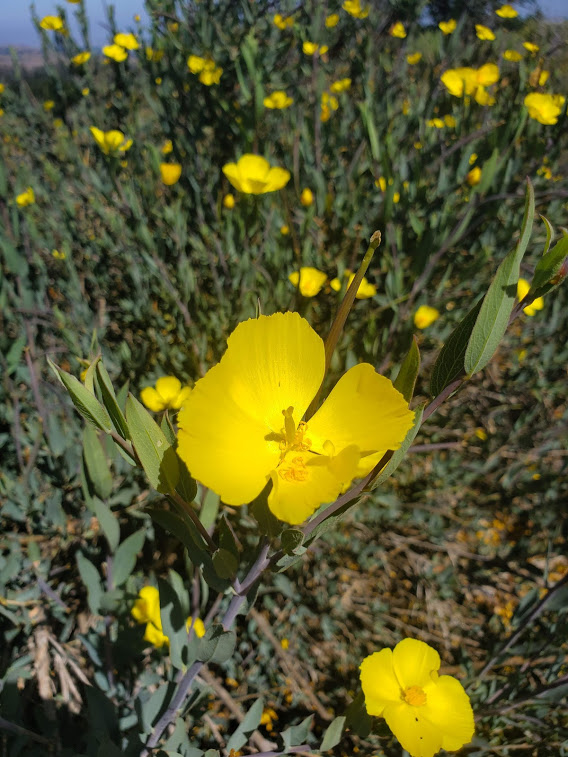
Dendromecon rigida Orcutt, California

Dendromecon rigida is a small perennial shrub, rarely exceeding 3 metres (9.8 ft) tall. The leaves are alternate, narrow lanceolate, 3–10 cm (1.2–3.9 in) long, more than three times as long as broad. The margin of the leaves is finely toothed. The plant is evergreen and the leaves are somewhat leathery to the touch.

The inflorescences are solitary and terminal. The flowers are 2–7 cm (0.79–2.76 in) diameter, with four satiny yellow petals. The receptacle is funnel-shaped and surrounds the ovary base. Two sepals are shed when the flower blooms, and the petals are shed as well after pollination. There are many free stamens.

Flowering time varies by the region. In the Santa Monica Mountains, plants flower from February through April, while others elsewhere in the range usually occur from April to June and occasionally into August. Some populations produce few flowers year-round.

The fruits produced are cylindric and dehiscent from the base; the fruits measure 5–10 cm (2.0–3.9 in) long. The seed's shape is spherical, and it's hard and brittle to the touch. They have a coat and appendage that attracts ants that allows the seat to be dispersed. The colors range from brown or black, with a small pale outgrowth.

=== Varieties ===
- Dendromecon rigida ssp. harfordii (former classification) — Channel Islands tree poppy; the current botanical name is Dendromecon harfordii.

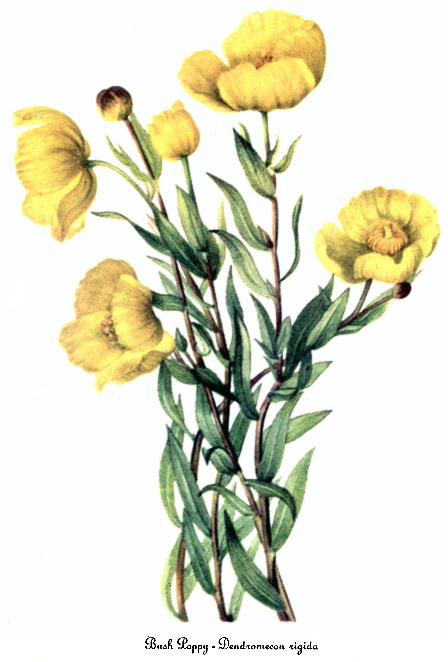
Dendromecon rigida botanical art by Mary Vaux Walcott.

== Ecology ==
Dendromecon rigida is a shrub that depends on seed production to cultivate. Plants cannot resprout after fires as they do not form a lignotuber, so populations are mainly established through seeds stored in the soil. Plants first bloom in their second spring.

Like many chaparral species, D. rigida has seeds that germinate in response to fires. In laboratory experiments, its seeds germinated when they experienced smoke treatment after being stored for a year in soil. Just smoke was not enough. The seeds contain a tiny, underdeveloped embryo and oily endosperm.

Seeds are dispersed in two stages. The capsules split open and scatter seeds up to several meters from the parent plant. Ants then carry the seeds further, and seeds accumulate around the nests of harvester ants in the genera Pogonomyrmex and Veromessor. Each seed has an appendage that the ants remove and eat, a strategy for dispersal known as myrmecochory.

Dendromecon is eaten primarily by livestock and wildlife animals. Goats are the main animal that eats the plant, however after fires, deer and sheep feed on the new sprouts that appear.

== Cultivation ==
Dendromecon rigida is cultivated as an ornamental plant by specialty plant nurseries. It is used in native plant and drought tolerant gardens and natural landscaping.

This poppy prefers fast draining soils but will grow well in clay soil if there is little to no water after it is established. It has a pH tolerance from 6 to 8 and a rainfall tolerance of 31 to 90 cm (12 to 35 in). This bush also prefers to be in full sun.

Seed dormancy makes it hard for the bush poppy to grow from the seed itself. Fire treated seeds are usually the most reliable based on nursery evidence. They grow from the moisture of the soil, covered in a layer of dry pine leaves and needles that is burned before watering. Germination is at its best when the temperature is cold and moist. A study found that seeds that had been soaked in smoke-water germinated best in warm temperatures.
