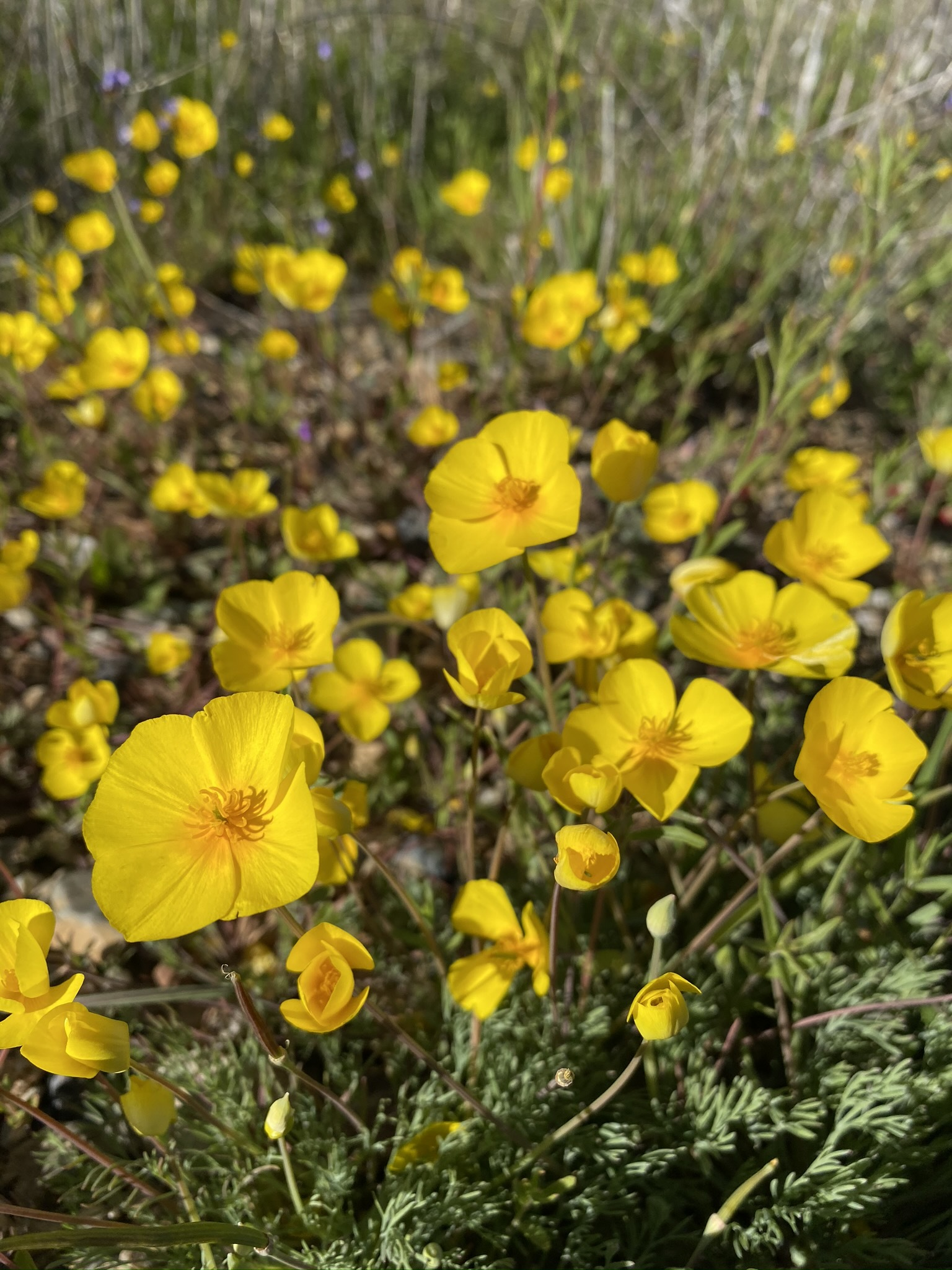

Scientific classification
- Kingdom: Plantae
- Clade: Tracheophytes
- Clade: Angiosperms
- Clade: Eudicots
- Order: Ranunculales
- Family: Papaveraceae
- Genus: Eschscholzia
- Species: E. lobbii

Binomial name
- Eschscholzia lobbii Greene

= Eschscholzia lobbii =

Species of flowering plant

Eschscholzia lobbii is a species of poppy known by the common name frying pans. It is endemic to California, where it grows in the Central Valley and adjacent Sierra Nevada foothills. The frying pans is a small annual herb growing from a patch of segmented leaves with pointed leaflets. It produces erect stalks up to 15 centimeters in height each bearing a single poppy flower. The petals are about a centimeter long and bright yellow to somewhat orange. The fruit is a capsule 3 to 7 centimeters long containing tiny brown seeds.

They are common near vernal pools.

The plant is named after William Lobb (1809–1864), the English plant collector.
