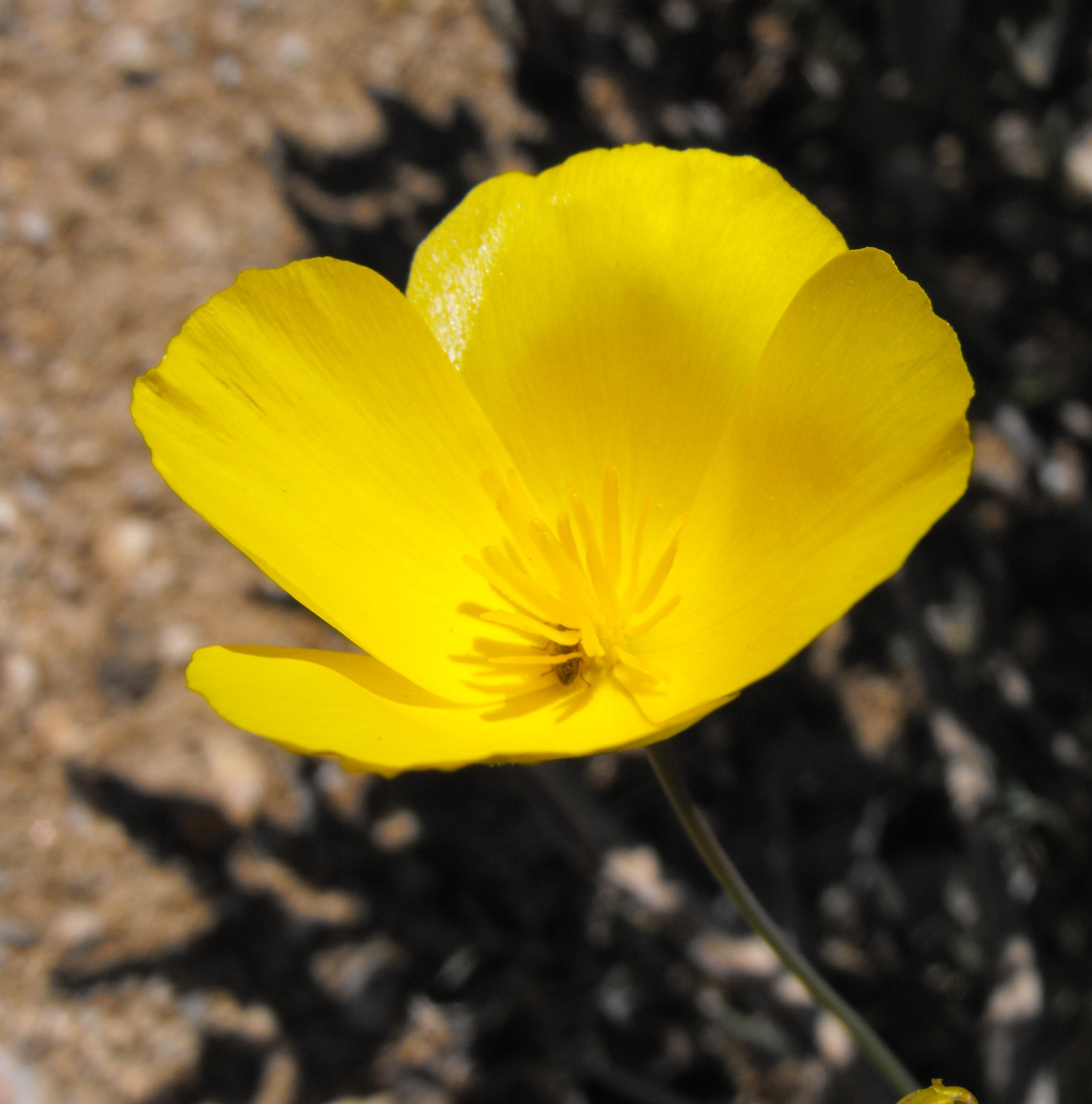

Scientific classification
- Kingdom: Plantae
- Clade: Tracheophytes
- Clade: Angiosperms
- Clade: Eudicots
- Order: Ranunculales
- Family: Papaveraceae
- Genus: Eschscholzia
- Species: E. parishii

Binomial name
- Eschscholzia parishii Greene

= Eschscholzia parishii =

Species of flowering plant

Eschscholzia parishii, with the common name Parish's poppy, is an annual desert wildflower in the Poppy family (Papaveraceae), native to several North American desert regions.

This desert species is related to the California poppy (Eschscholzia californica), that's found in Mediterranean climate regions of the state.

== Distribution ==
Eschscholzia parishii is native to the Mojave Desert and the Colorado Desert surrounding the Salton Sea in southern California, and southwards across the Sonoran Desert southwards along the Gulf of California to the vicinity of Bahía de los Ángeles, Baja California.
