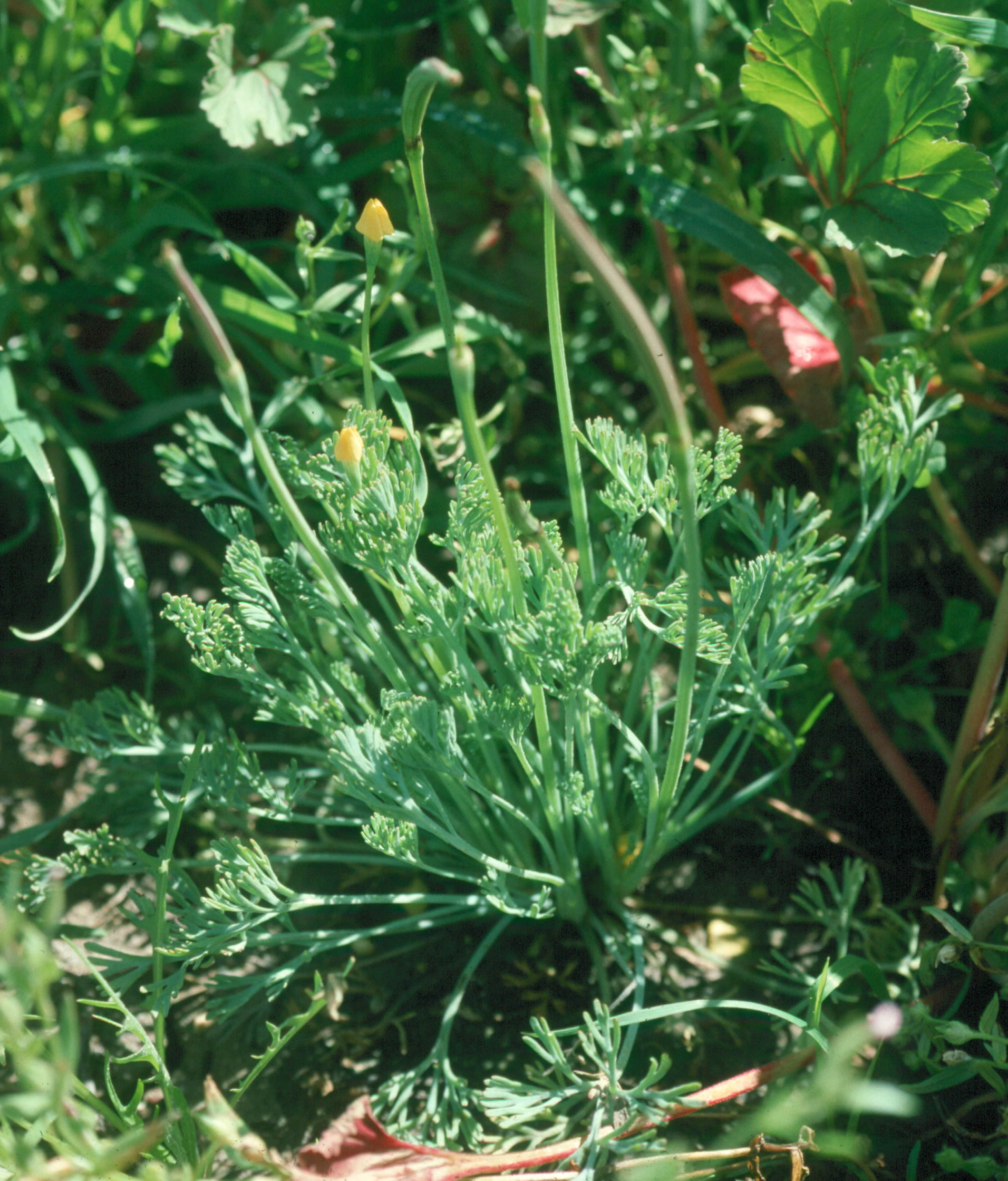

Conservation status
- Critically Imperiled (NatureServe)

Scientific classification
- Kingdom: Plantae
- Clade: Tracheophytes
- Clade: Angiosperms
- Clade: Eudicots
- Order: Ranunculales
- Family: Papaveraceae
- Genus: Eschscholzia
- Species: E. rhombipetala

Binomial name
- Eschscholzia rhombipetala Greene

= Eschscholzia rhombipetala =

Species of flowering plant

Eschscholzia rhombipetala, the diamond-petaled California poppy, is endemic to California.

It a relative of the California poppy, with diminutive flowers.

Once thought extinct, it was rediscovered in the 1990s in the northern Carrizo Plain of the Southern Interior California Coast Ranges in San Luis Obispo County; and in a location at the Lawrence Livermore National Laboratory in Alameda County in the East San Francisco Bay Area.

== Description ==
The species is 2–12 in (5.1–30.5 cm) tall and has yellow flowers.
