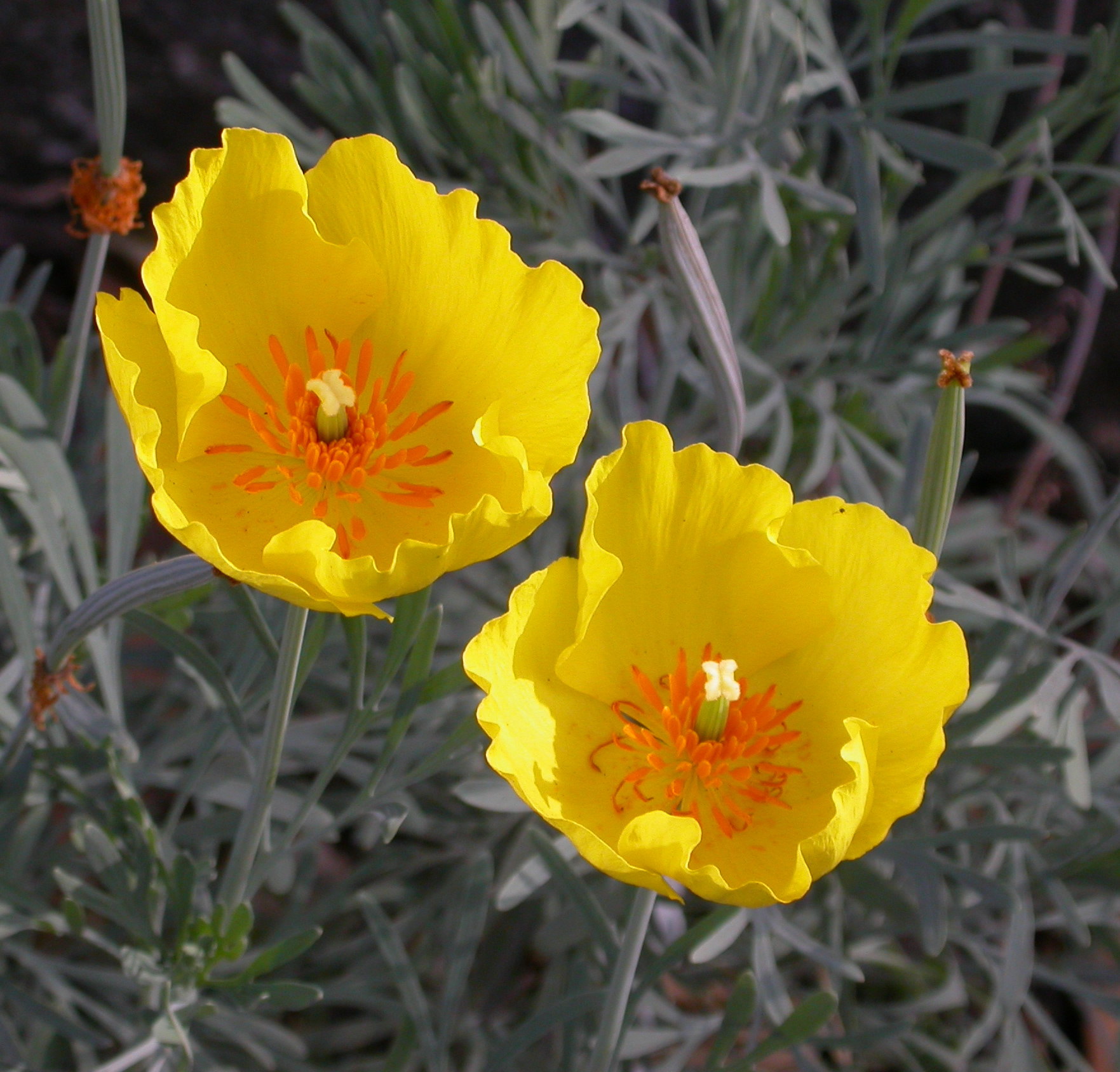

Scientific classification
- Kingdom: Plantae
- Clade: Tracheophytes
- Clade: Angiosperms
- Clade: Eudicots
- Order: Ranunculales
- Family: Papaveraceae
- Subfamily: Papaveroideae
- Tribe: Eschscholzieae
- Genus: Hunnemannia; Sweet
- Species: H. fumariifolia

Binomial name
- Hunnemannia fumariifolia Sweet

= Hunnemannia =

Genus of flowering plants

Hunnemannia is a monotypic genus of flowering plants in the poppy family Papaveraceae, containing the single species Hunnemannia fumariifolia (tulip poppy or Mexican tulip poppy) native to the highlands of Mexico. It is typically found at elevations of 1,500–2,000 m (4,921–6,562 ft) in the Chihuahuan Desert and south into central Mexico, where it favors rocky habitats, occurring along roadsides as well.

It is a perennial whose erect stems are somewhat woody at the base, and may reach 60 cm (24 in) in height. The leaves resemble those of the closely related Eschscholzia, being finely divided into many gray-green linear lobes. The flowers are solitary yellow cups formed from four overlapping petals, 5–7 cm across, vaguely resembling the unrelated tulip; the two sepals underneath typically fall away as the flower opens. The numerous stamens are short, with orange anthers. The long thin fruits are also reminiscent of Eschscholzia.

The genus is named for English botanist and collector John Hunnemann (1760-1839). The Latin fumariifolia literally means "with leaves like Fumaria" (fumitory).

It is widely cultivated, usually as an annual from seed. In colder climates it requires the shelter of a south-facing wall, in full sun. The cultivar 'Sunlite' has gained the Royal Horticultural Society's Award of Garden Merit.
