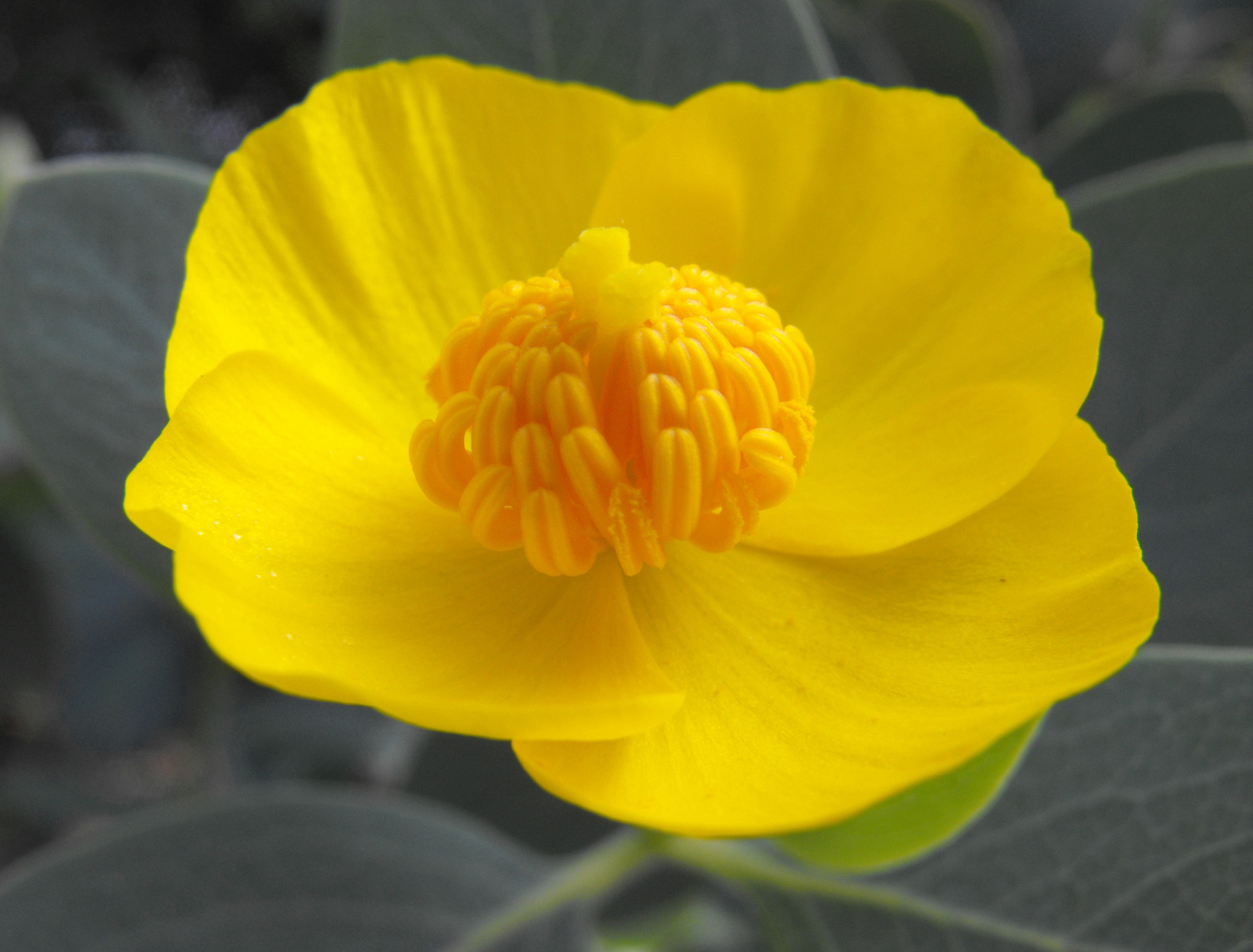

Conservation status
- Vulnerable (NatureServe)

Scientific classification
- Kingdom: Plantae
- Clade: Tracheophytes
- Clade: Angiosperms
- Clade: Eudicots
- Order: Ranunculales
- Family: Papaveraceae
- Genus: Dendromecon
- Species: D. harfordii

Binomial name
- Dendromecon harfordii Kellogg

Synonyms
- Dendromecon rigida subsp. harfordii

= Dendromecon harfordii =

Species of tree

Dendromecon harfordii, known by the common names Channel Islands tree poppy and Harford's tree poppy, is a species of flowering plant in the poppy family.

It was formerly treated as subspecies of the related species Dendromecon rigida, and had the botanical name Dendromecon rigida subsp. harfordii.

== Distribution ==
The plant is endemic to San Clemente Island, Santa Catalina Island, Santa Cruz Island, and Santa Rosa Island in the Channel Islands of California.

It is found in California coastal sage and chaparral habitats on the islands.

== Description ==
Dendromecon harfordii is a shrub or small tree reaching heights between 2–6 metres (7–20 ft). It has thin branching stems covered sparsely in smooth-edged, oval-shaped leaves 3 to 8 centimetres (1.2 to 3.1 in) long.

It bears showy flowers with four bright yellow petals each 2 or 3 centimetres (0.79 or 1.18 in) long.

The fruit is a curved, cylindrical capsule over 7 centimetres (2.8 in) in length.

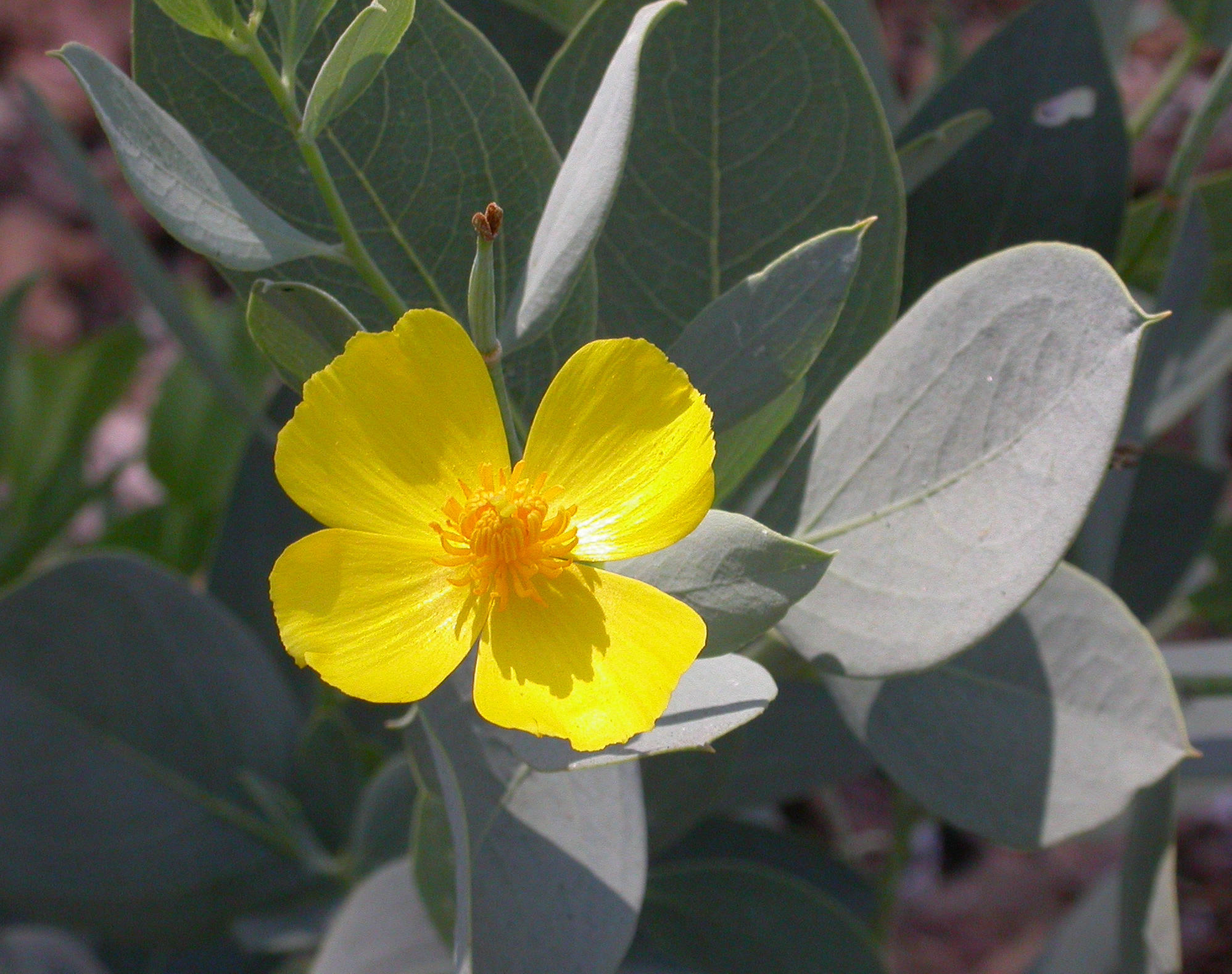
Foliage and flower.

== Cultivation ==
Dendromecon harfordii is cultivated as an ornamental plant, for planting in native plant, drought tolerant, and wildlife gardens, and in natural landscaping projects.
