= Eschscholzia palmeri =

Scientific classification
- Kingdom: Plantae
- Clade: Tracheophytes
- Clade: Angiosperms
- Clade: Eudicots
- Order: Ranunculales
- Family: Papaveraceae
- Genus: Eschscholzia
- Species: E. palmeri

Binomial name
- Eschscholzia palmeri Rose

Synonyms
- Eschscholzia frutescens (Greene) J.T. Howell

Species of flowering plant

Eschscholzia palmeri is a species of poppy native to Guadalupe Island in Mexico. It is a low growing woody perennial with a narrow taproot and yellow flowers.
