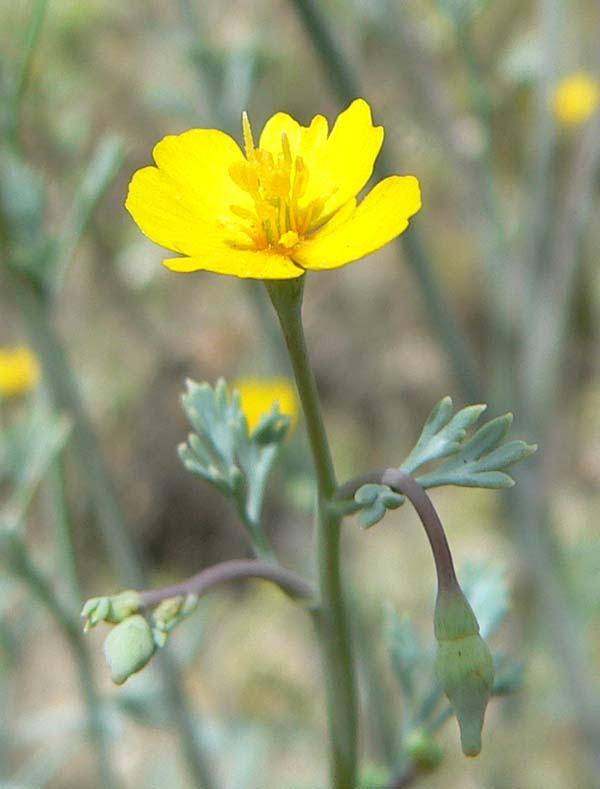

Conservation status
- Secure (NatureServe)

Scientific classification
- Kingdom: Plantae
- Clade: Tracheophytes
- Clade: Angiosperms
- Clade: Eudicots
- Order: Ranunculales
- Family: Papaveraceae
- Genus: Eschscholzia
- Species: E. minutiflora

Binomial name
- Eschscholzia minutiflora S.Wats.

= Eschscholzia minutiflora =

Species of flowering plant

Eschscholzia minutiflora is a species of poppy known by the common name pygmy poppy.

It is native to the deserts of the southwestern United States and northern Mexico. This wildflower is an annual herb growing from a patch of segmented leaves with divided, rounded leaflets. The thin, erect or nodding stems may be very short or up to 35 centimeters tall. They bear small poppy flowers with petals varying in size from only a few millimeters long or up to two and a half centimeters in length, and bright yellow in color, sometimes with orange spotting. The fruit is a capsule 3 to 6 centimeters long containing tiny brown to black seeds.

The species contains three subspecies:

- Eschscholzia minutiflora subsp. minutiflora has the smallest flowers (petals 0.3-1.0 cm long), the broadest range, and n = 18 chromosomes.
- Eschscholzia minutiflora subsp. covillei (Greene) C.Clark has flowers of intermediate size (petals 0.6-1.8 cm long), n = 12 chromosomes, and is found in the Mojave Desert.
- Eschscholzia minutiflora subsp. twisselmannii C.Clark has the largest flowers (petals 1.0-2.6 cm long), n = 6 chromosomes, and occurs in the El Paso and Rand mountains of the Mojave Desert.
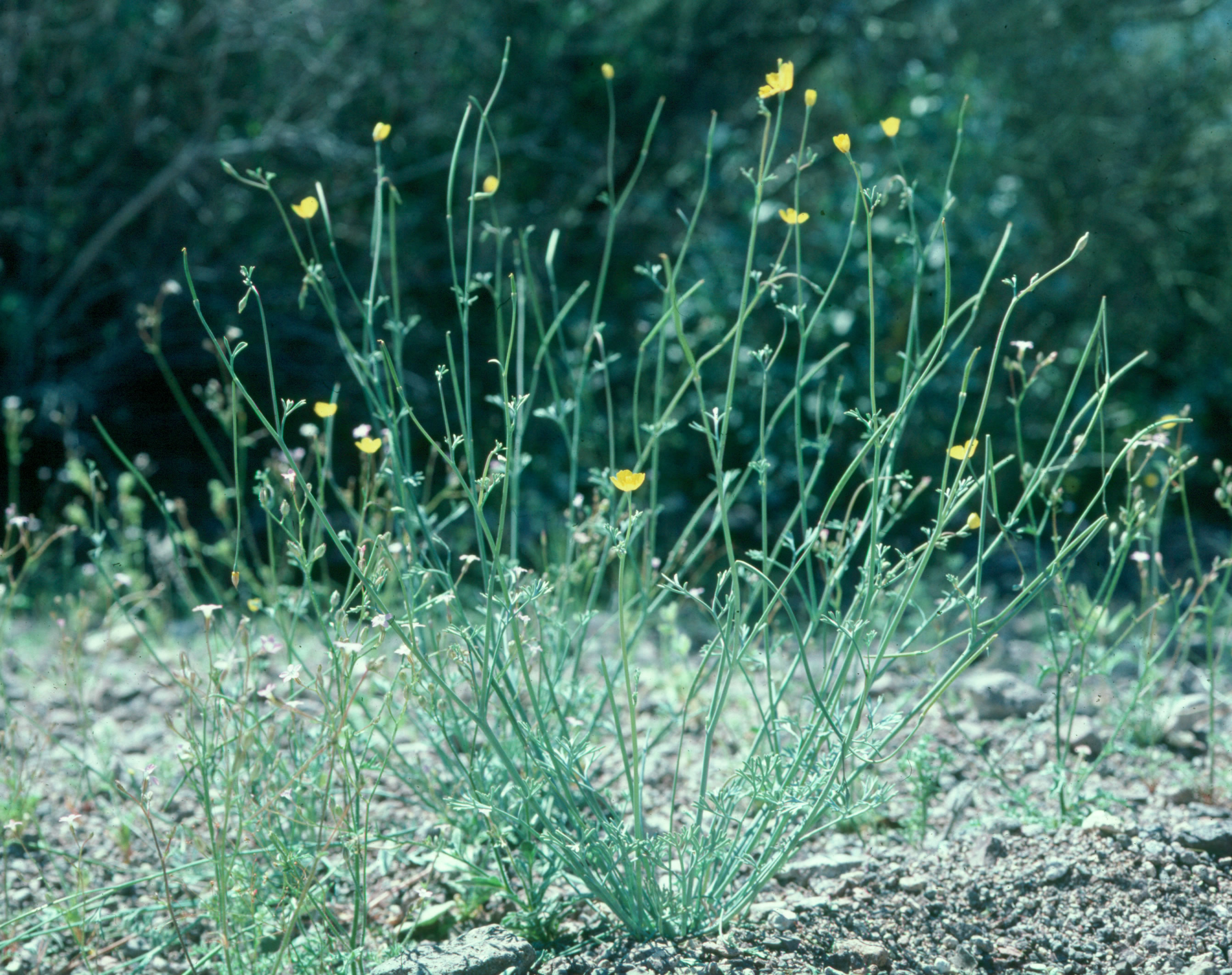
Eschscholzia minutiflora subsp. minutiflora

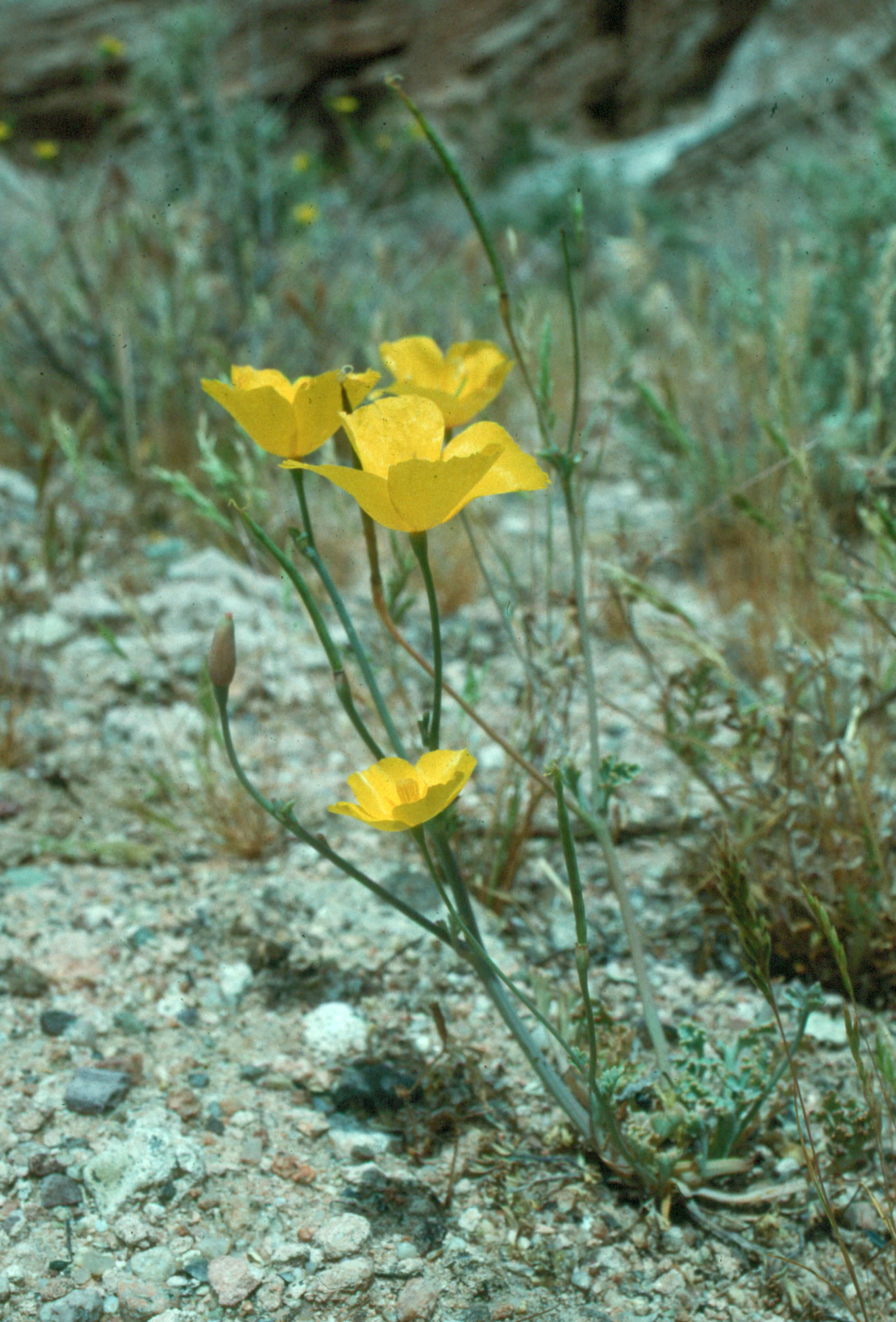
Eschscholzia minutiflora subsp. twisselmannii
