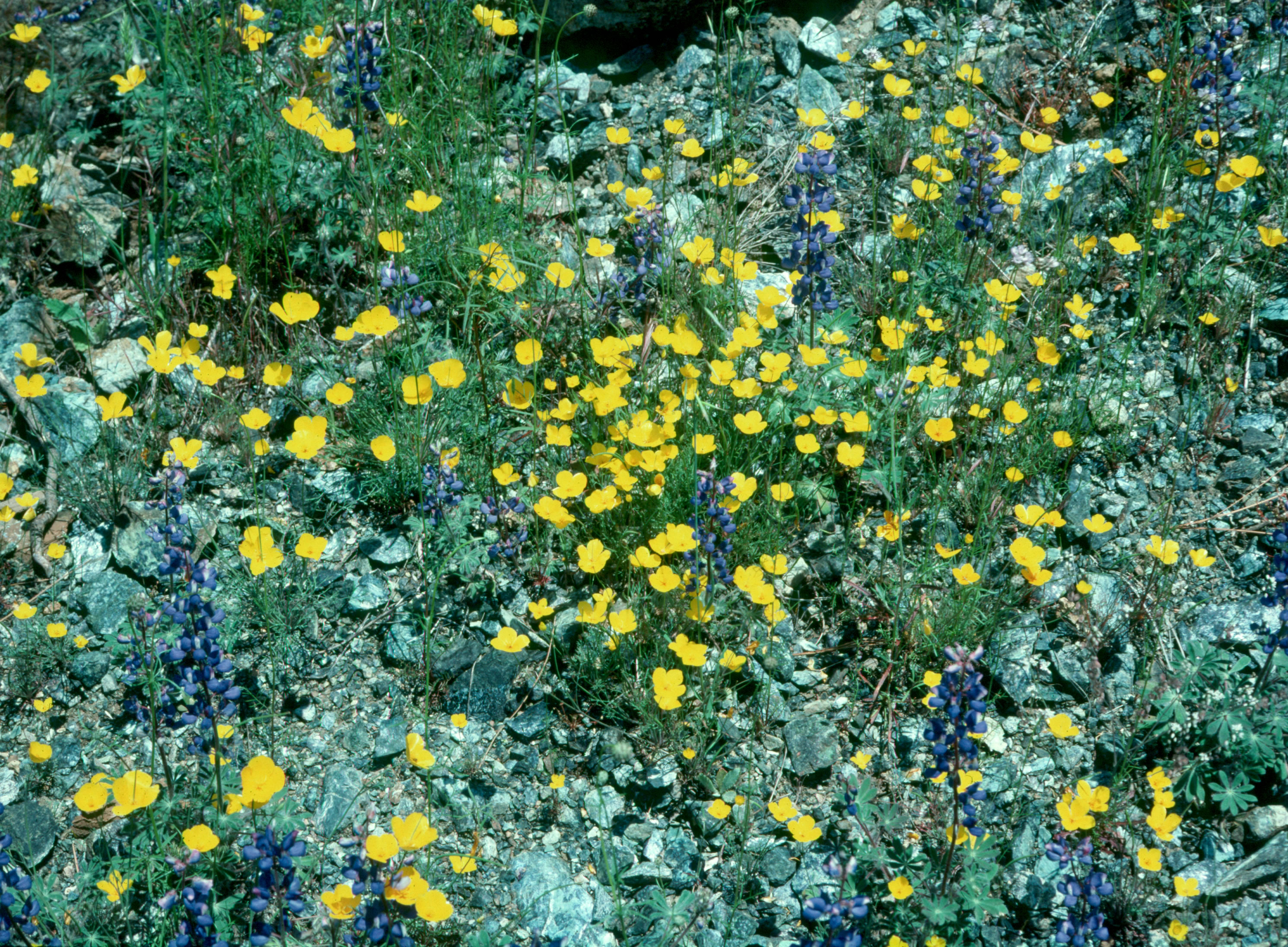

Scientific classification
- Kingdom: Plantae
- Clade: Tracheophytes
- Clade: Angiosperms
- Clade: Eudicots
- Order: Ranunculales
- Family: Papaveraceae
- Genus: Eschscholzia
- Species: E. caespitosa

Binomial name
- Eschscholzia caespitosa Benth.

= Eschscholzia caespitosa =

Species of flowering plant

Eschscholzia caespitosa is a species of poppy known by the common names foothill poppy, tufted poppy and collarless California poppy.

It is native to western North America from Oregon, across California, to Baja California where it is a member of the chaparral plant community.

== Description ==
Eschscholzia caespitosa is an annual herb which is quite similar in appearance to its relative, the California poppy. It produces patches of foliage made up of several leaflets per leaf and thin, erect stems up to 30 centimetres (11 5/6 in) in height.

The poppy flower has orange to yellow petals each 1 to 2 1/2 centimetres (1/3 to 1 in) long. The fruit is a cylindrical capsule 4 to 8 centimetres (1 1/2 to 3 1/6 in) long containing tiny dark netted seeds.
