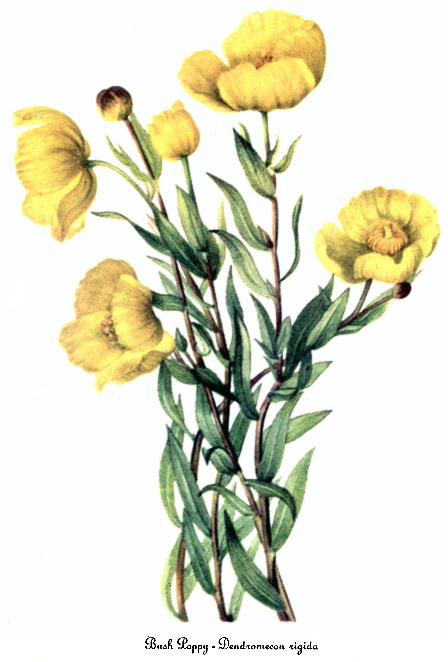
- Watercolor painting of Dendromecon rigida by Mary Vaux Walcott

Scientific classification
- Kingdom: Plantae
- Clade: Tracheophytes
- Clade: Angiosperms
- Clade: Eudicots
- Order: Ranunculales
- Family: Papaveraceae
- Subfamily: Papaveroideae
- Tribe: Eschscholzieae
- Genus: Dendromecon; Benth.

Species
- Dendromecon rigida; Dendromecon harfordii

= Dendromecon =

Genus of flowering plants

Dendromecon, the bush poppy, is a genus of one or two species of shrubs to small trees, native to California and northern Baja California.

The leaves are evergreen, alternate, lanceolate to ovate, 3–10 cm long. The flowers are yellow, satiny, and shed after pollination.

== Species ==
Two species of Dendromecon are widely accepted, though some botanists consider them to belong to just one species, only distinct at the lower rank of subspecies:

| Image | Name | Description | Distribution |
|---|---|---|---|
| | Dendromecon harfordii (syn. D. rigida subsp. harfordii) Channel Island tree poppy | A larger plant, occasionally becoming a small tree to 6 metres (20 ft) tall; leaves broad, less than three times as long as broad. | Endemic to the Channel Islands of California. |
| | Dendromecon rigida - bush poppy | A smaller plant, rarely exceeding 3 metres (9.8 ft) tall; leaves narrow, more than three times as long as broad. | Occurring on mainland California (Pacific Coast Ranges and Sierra Nevada foothills) and northern Baja California. |
