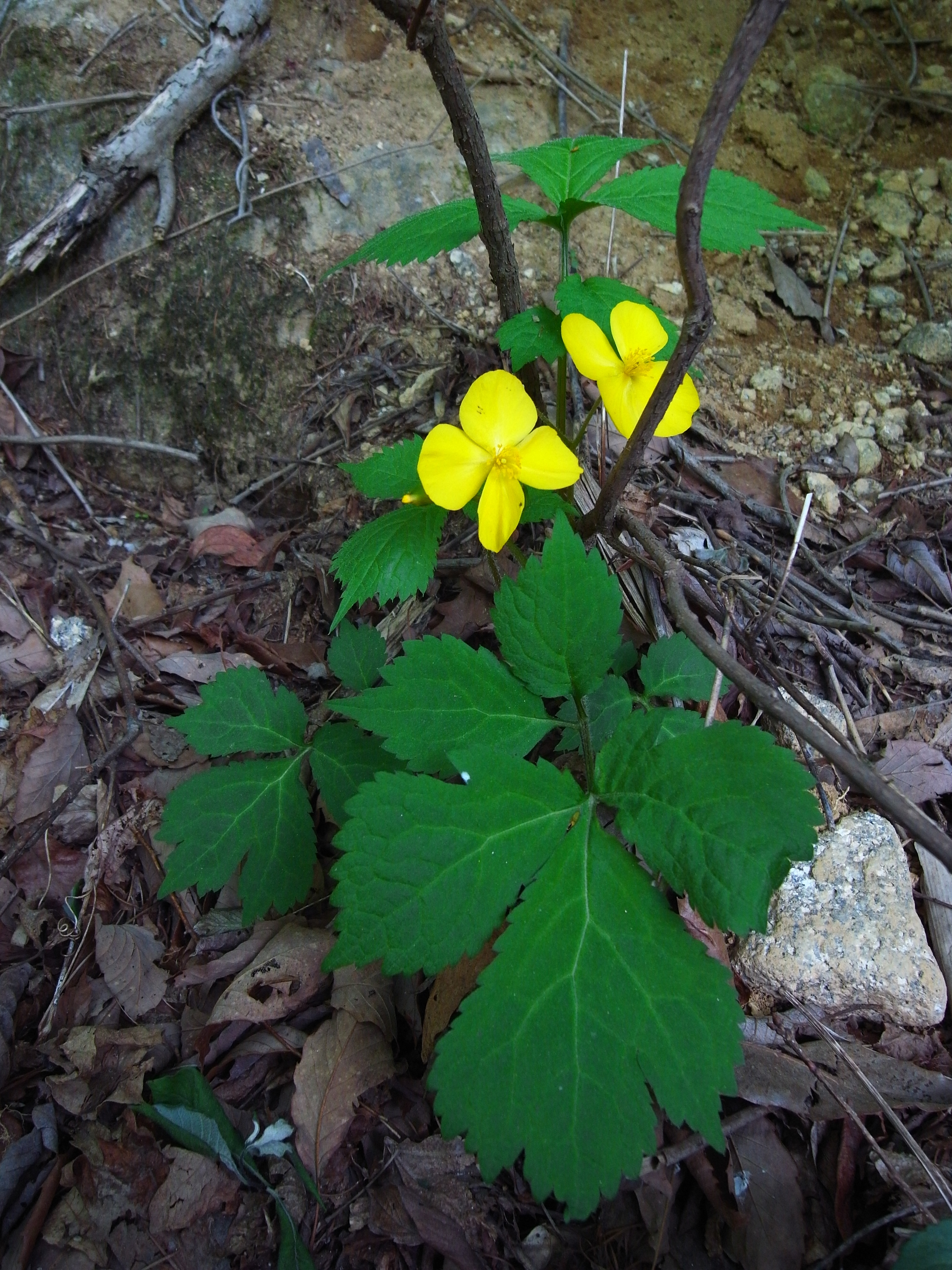

Scientific classification
- Kingdom: Plantae
- Clade: Tracheophytes
- Clade: Angiosperms
- Clade: Eudicots
- Order: Ranunculales
- Family: Papaveraceae
- Genus: Coreanomecon; Nakai
- Species: C. hylomeconoides

Binomial name
- Coreanomecon hylomeconoides Nakai

Synonyms
- Chelidonium hylomeconoides (Nakai) Ohwi; Hylomecon hylomeconoides (Nakai) Y.N.Lee

= Coreanomecon =

Genus of flowering plants

Coreanomecon is a monotypic genus of flowering plants belonging to the family Papaveraceae. Its native range is Korea. It contains only a single species, Coreanomecon hylomeconoides.

== Taxonomy ==
The genus Coreanomecon and the species Coreanomecon hylomeconoides were first described by botanist Takenoshin Nakai in 1935. The species has also been placed by some in the genera Chelidonium or Hylomecon, but morphological and molecular phylogenetic evidence suggest that although related to these genera, it forms a distinct lineage.

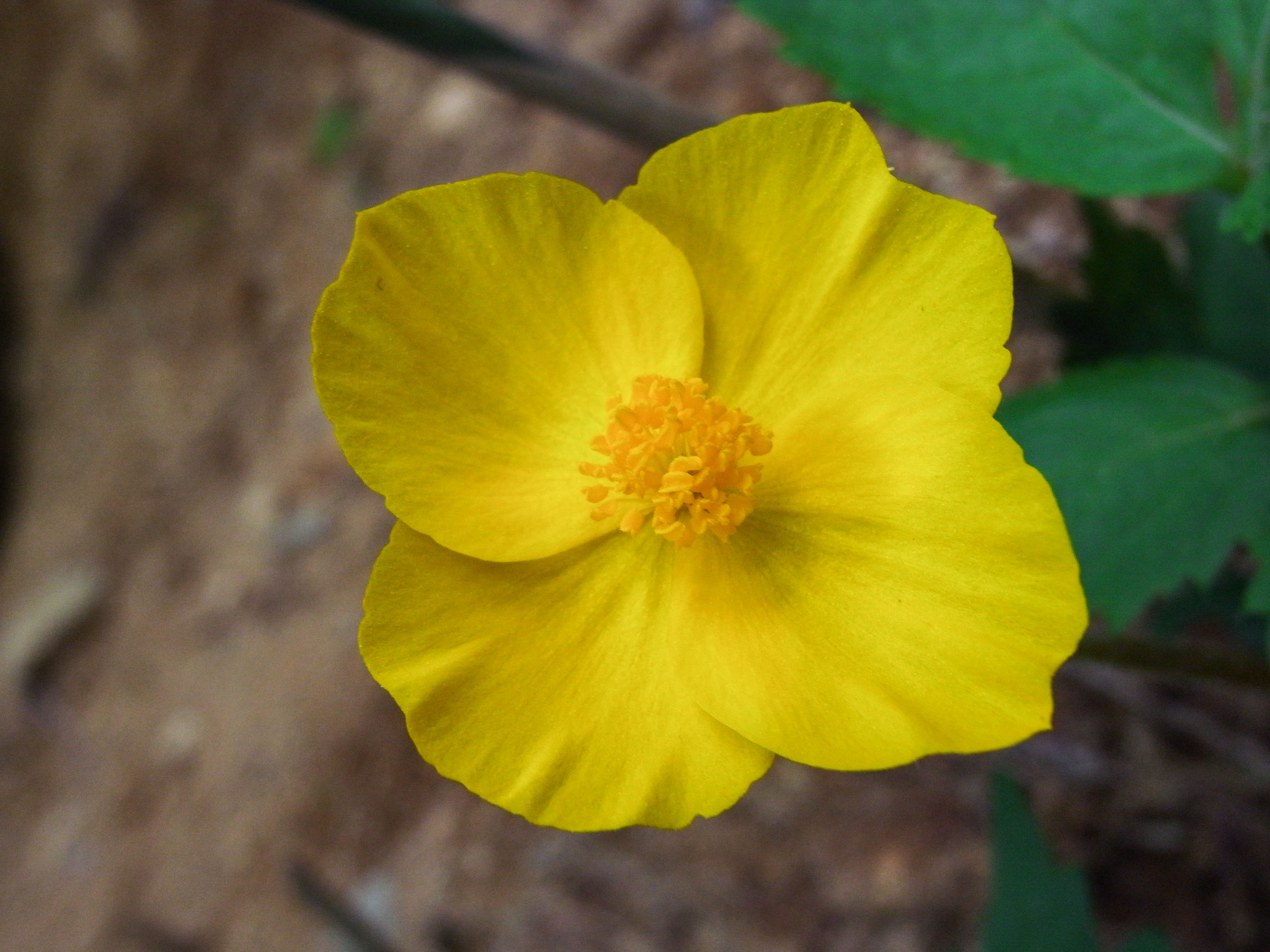
Flower
