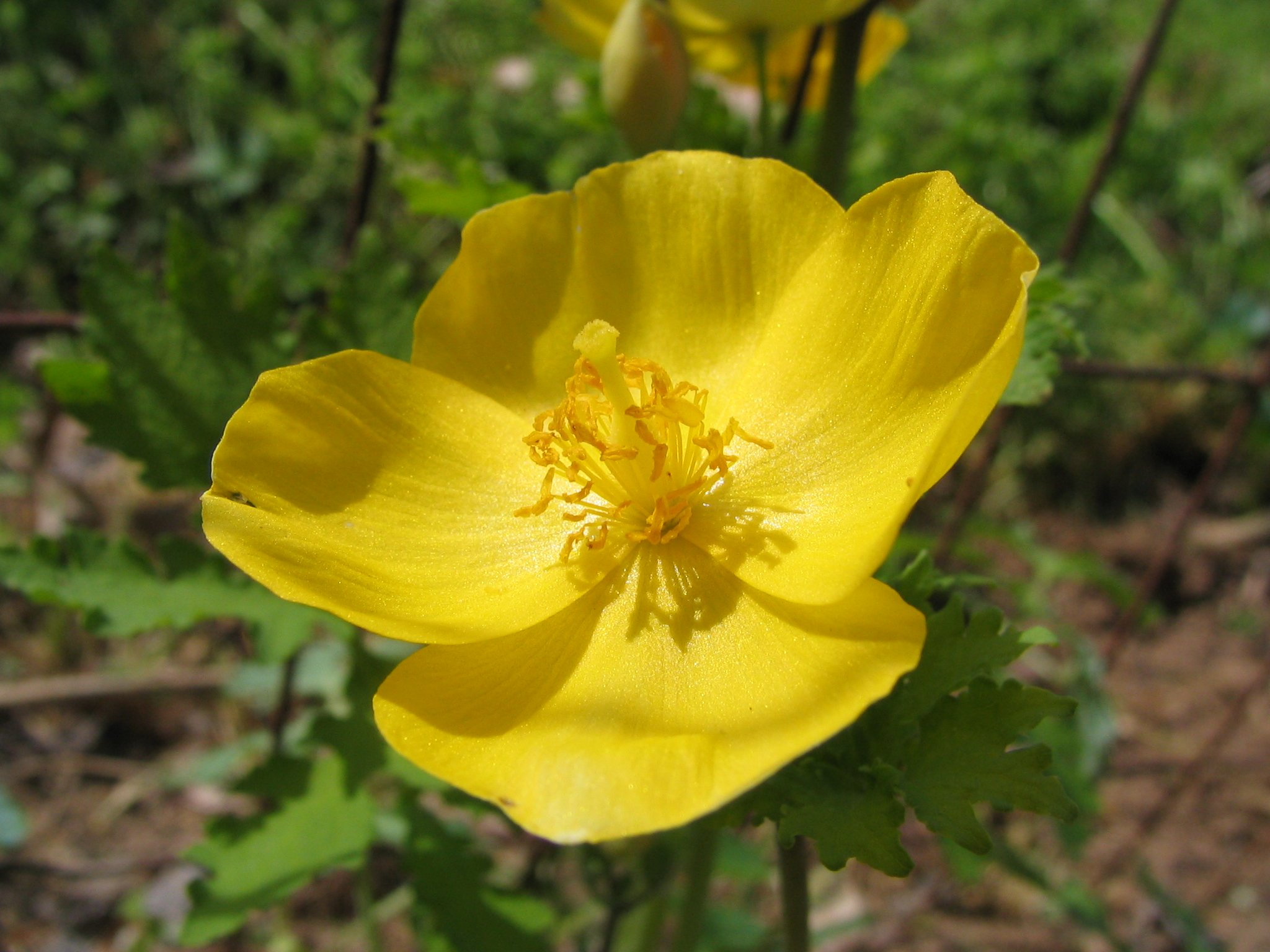
- Stylophorum diphyllum (type species)

Scientific classification
- Kingdom: Plantae
- Clade: Tracheophytes
- Clade: Angiosperms
- Clade: Eudicots
- Order: Ranunculales
- Family: Papaveraceae
- Subfamily: Papaveroideae
- Tribe: Chelidonieae
- Genus: Stylophorum; Nutt.

Type species
- Stylophorum diphyllum

= Stylophorum =

Genus of flowering plants

Stylophorum (celandine-poppy) is a genus of three species of herbaceous perennial plants native to woodland in eastern North America and China.

Stems are bristly, and leaves are lobed and have wavy edges.

Flowers are yellow and have four petals and an unusually long style, for which the genus is named. Several may be found on each stem.

The closely related Hylomecon vernalis has only one flower on each stem, and the greater celandine (Chelidonium majus) has branched stems and no bracts or bracteoles.

== Species ==
There are three species:

Image	Name	Distribution
	Stylophorum diphyllum	eastern North America
	Stylophorum lasiocarpum	central and eastern China
	Stylophorum sutchuenense	western China
