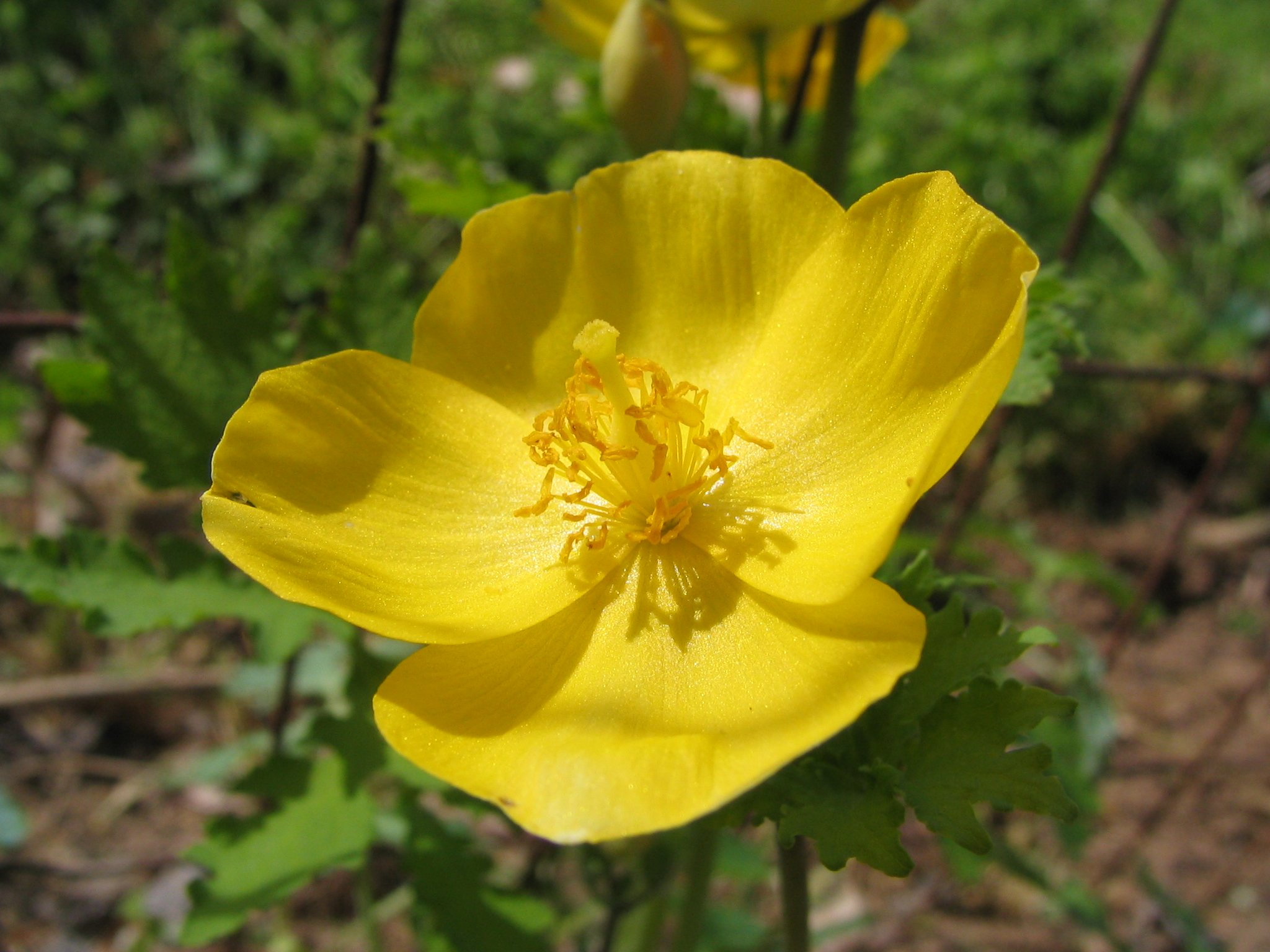

Conservation status
- Secure (NatureServe)

Scientific classification
- Kingdom: Plantae
- Clade: Tracheophytes
- Clade: Angiosperms
- Clade: Eudicots
- Order: Ranunculales
- Family: Papaveraceae
- Tribe: Chelidonieae
- Genus: Stylophorum
- Species: S. diphyllum

Binomial name
- Stylophorum diphyllum (Michx.) Nutt.

= Stylophorum diphyllum =

Species of flowering plant in poppy family

Stylophorum diphyllum, commonly called the celandine poppy or wood poppy, is an herbaceous plant in the poppy family (Papaveraceae). It is native to North America, where it is found in the eastern United States and Ontario. Its typical natural habitat is moist forests over calcareous rock, particularly in ravines.

It is occasionally cultivated for its bright yellow flowers. The common name is derived from greater celandine (Chelidonium majus), a closely related European plant with similar flowers and leaves.

== Description ==
Stylophorum diphyllum is an herbaceous perennial. It grows to about 1.5 feet (0.46 m) tall, from underground rhizomes. Leaves are pinnately cut and lobed. They grow from the base of the plant, and in a pair at the top of the flowering stems. Apart from its normal sap, Stylophorum diphyllum produces a yellow orange latex which can cause stains.

In spring, the deep yellow flowers of the celandine poppy appear as a brilliant display on the forest floor. The flowers have 4 yellow petals, two soon falling sepals, many yellow orange stamens, and a single knobby stigma. They appear singly or in umbels of two to four flowers from early spring to early summer. The flowers issue from between a pair of leaves at the top of the flowering stems. They produce pollen, but no nectar.

After fertilization, a bristly blue green pod hangs below the leaves. Seeds with white elaiosomes ripen in midsummer and the pod opens by four flaps.

Life stages

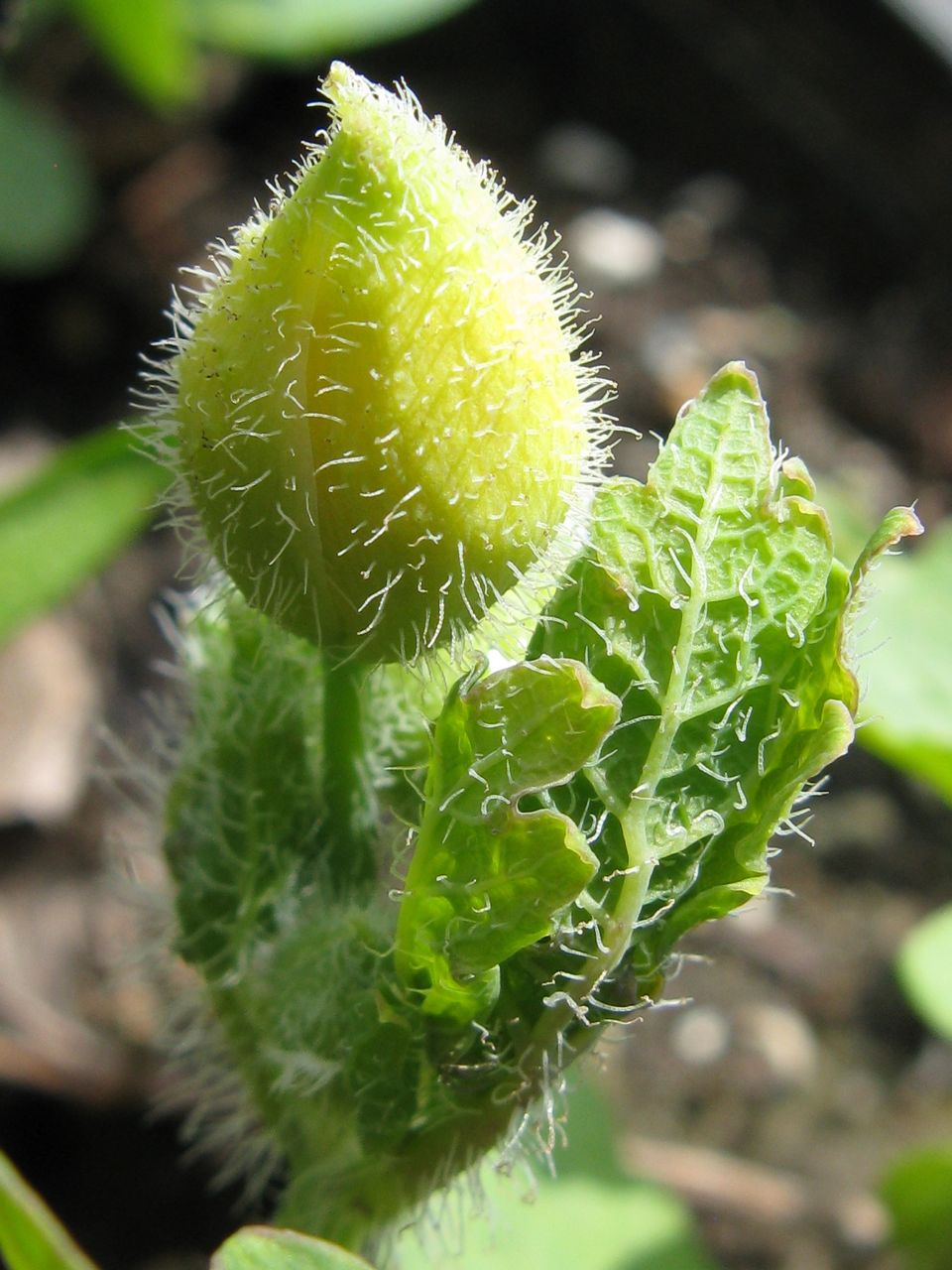
Flowerbud

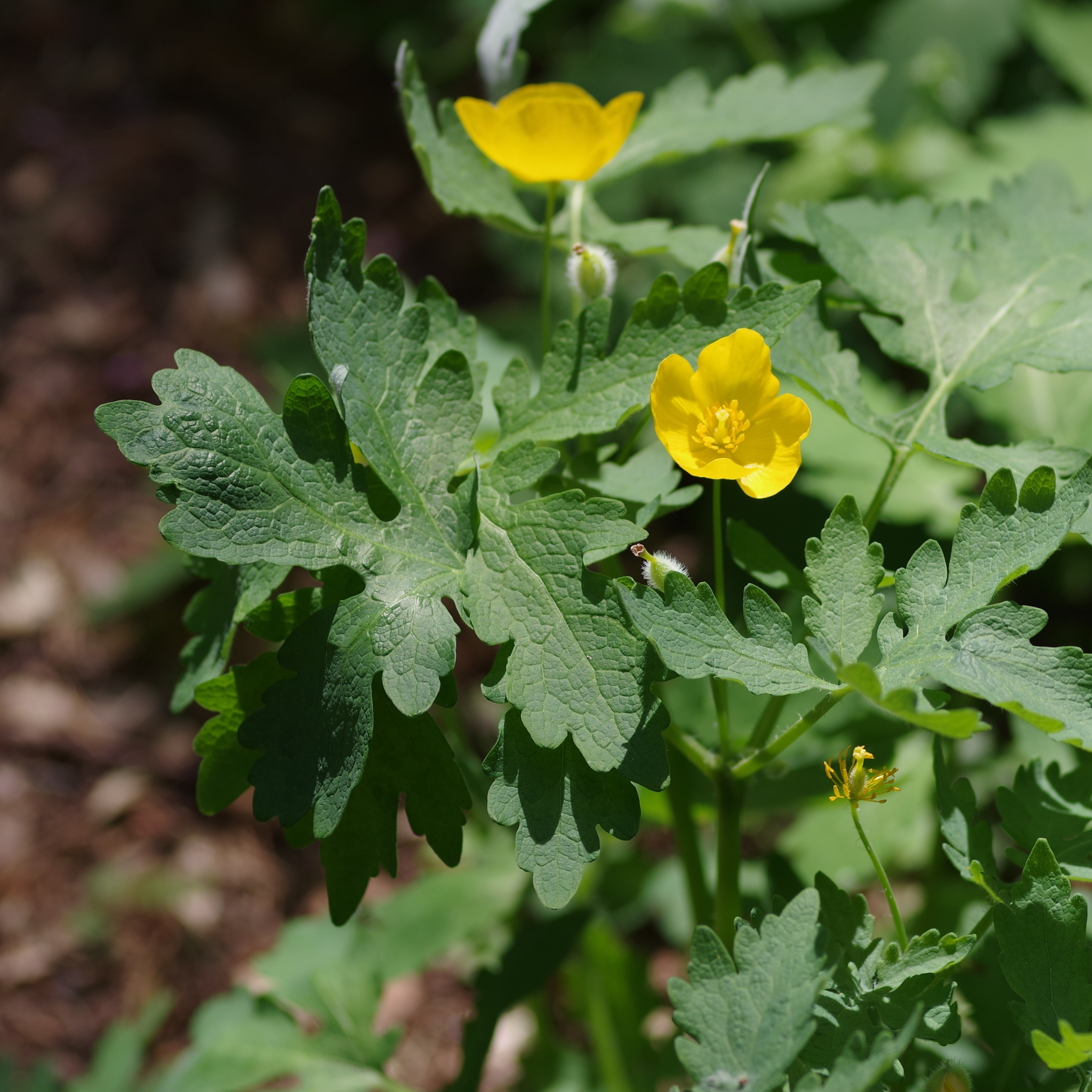
A blooming plant in North Carolina

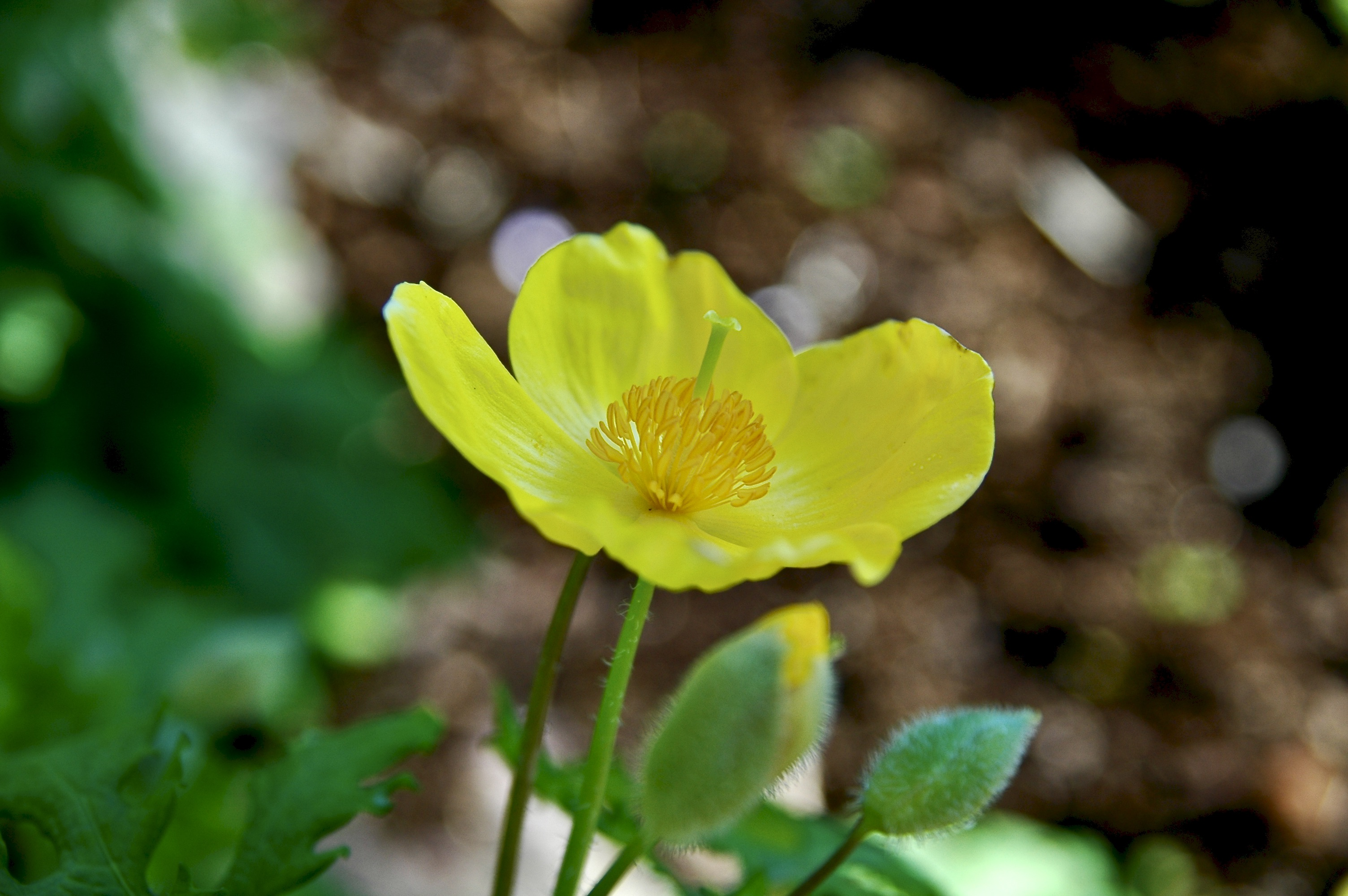
A flower and its reproductive parts

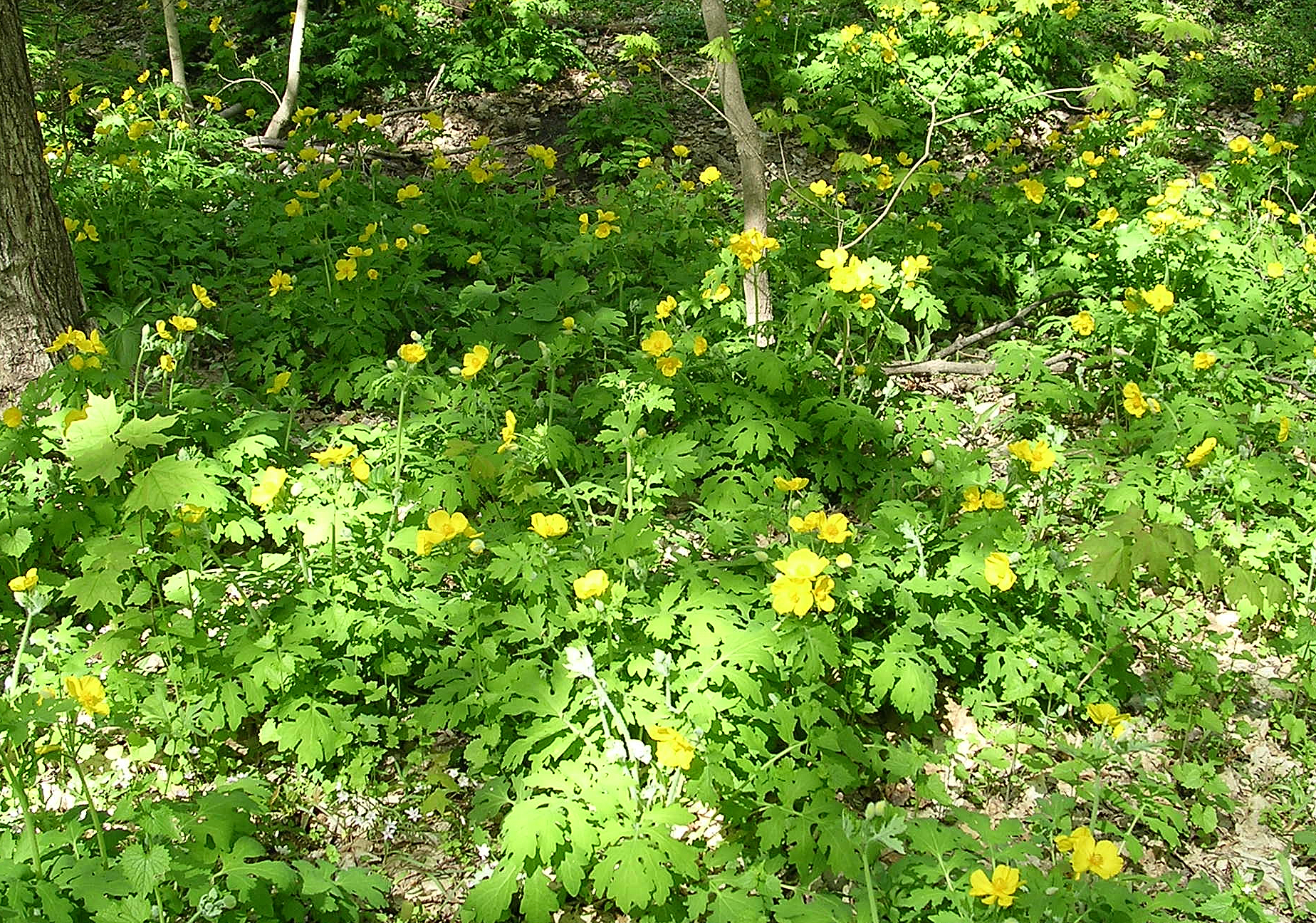
A patch of blooming plants at the Morton Arboretum in Illinois

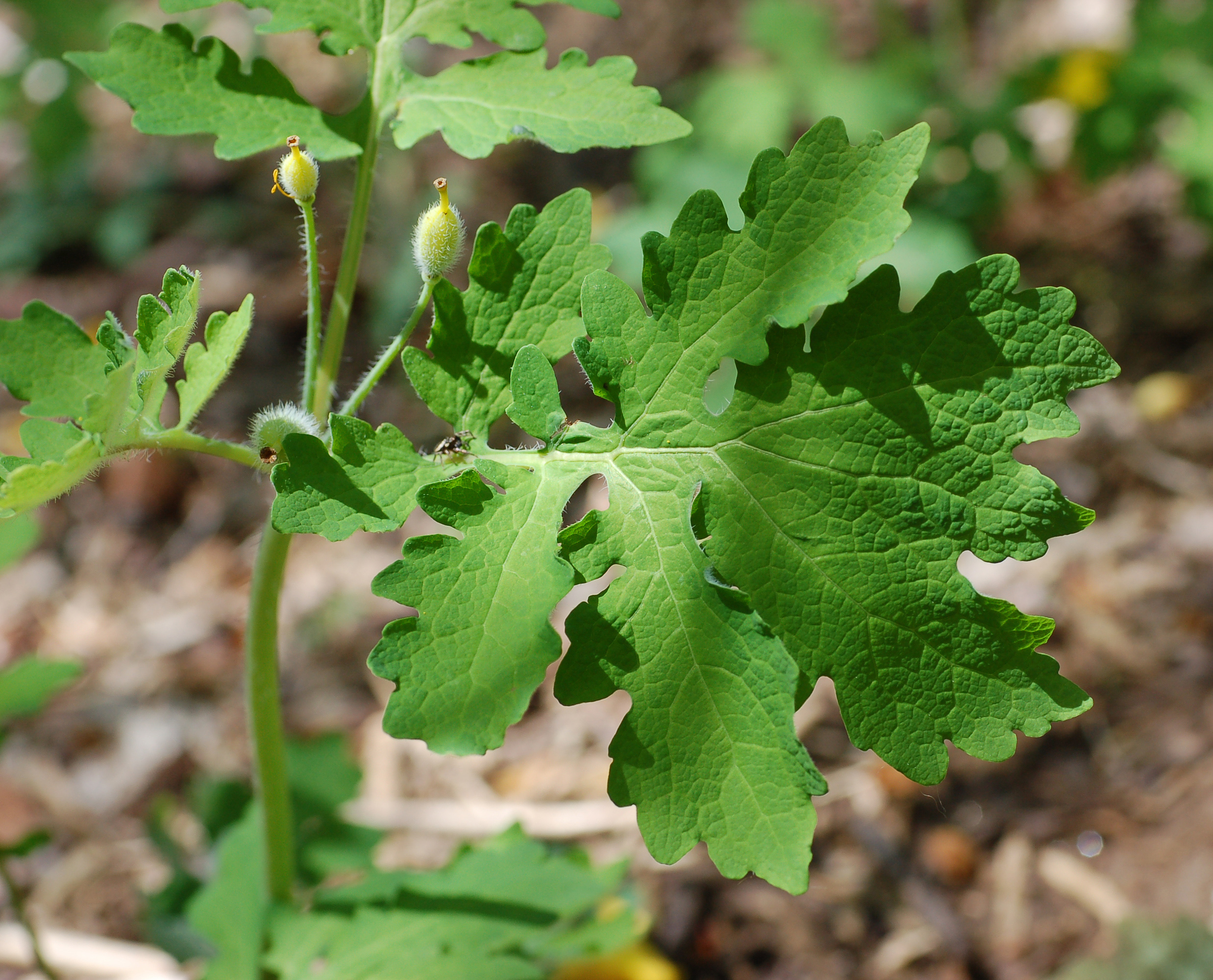
Leaf and immature pods

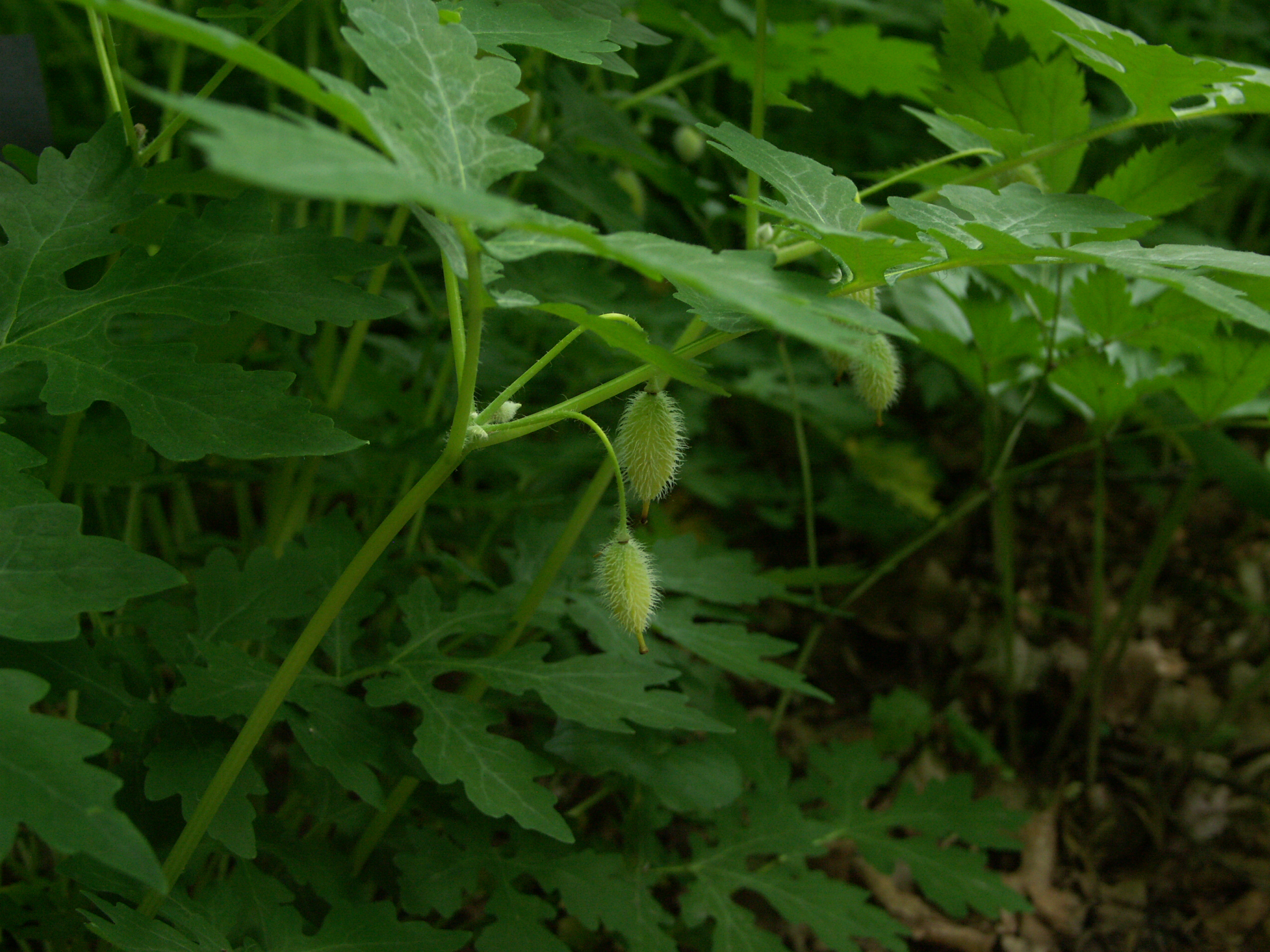
Pods closer to maturity, hanging below leaves

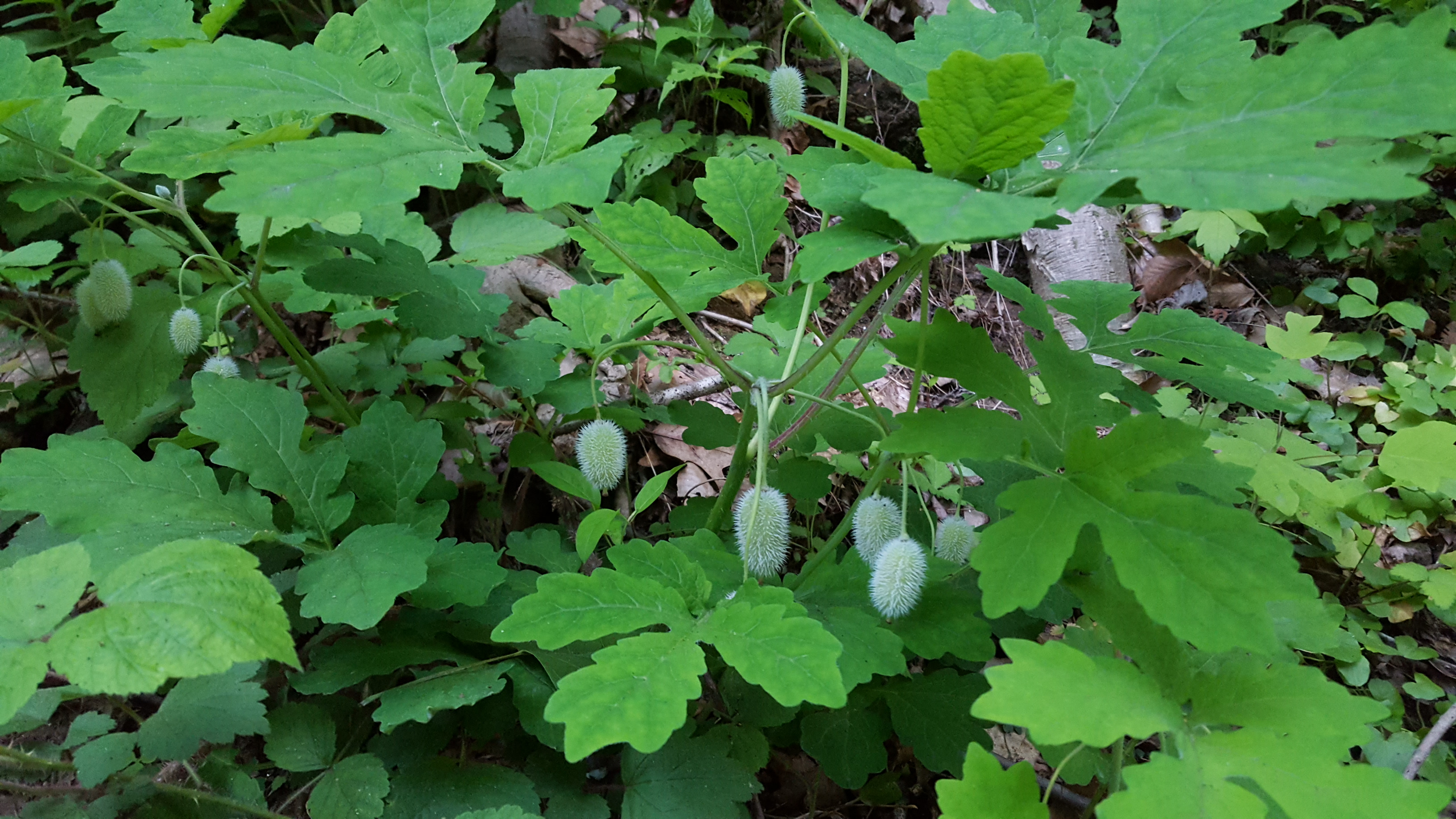
Maturing pods in a wild patch in Ellicott City, Maryland

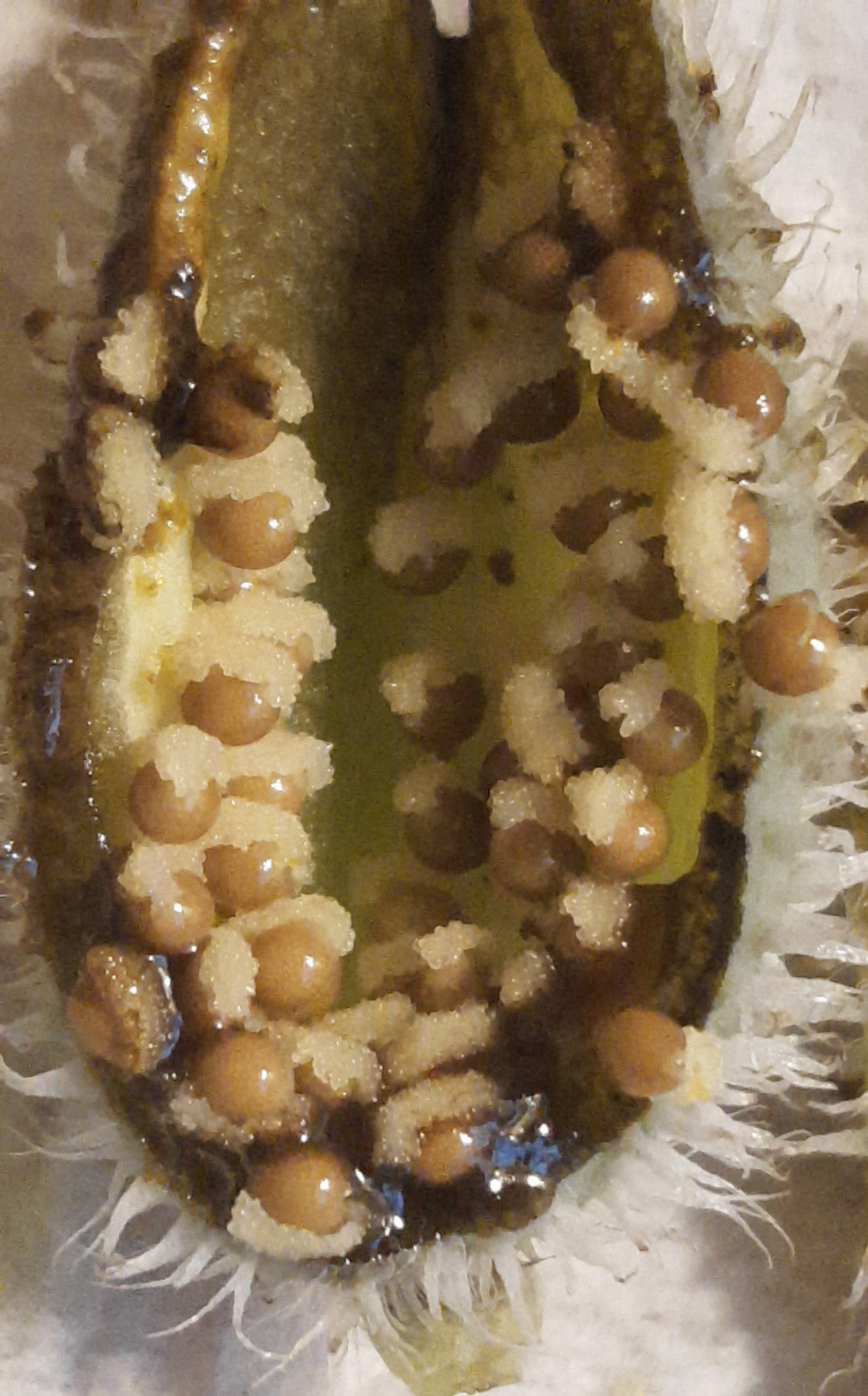
Stylophorum diphyllum seed pod showing elaisomes attached to seed

== Propagation ==
Propagation is done by seed or by dividing established clumps in spring. It grows best in moist, high-humus soil, and prefers to be in the shade. Division should be done early in the morning, preferably on a cloudy and mild day.

Plants are relatively long lived and readily self-seed under garden conditions.

== Conservation ==
Stylophorum diphyllum is a conservative species and is somewhat uncommon throughout its range. Forest clearance is responsible for the loss of some stands of this species. As the wood poppy requires semi-shaded conditions, even selective logging can have negative effects by creating large openings that allow too much sun to reach the forest floor.

Due to its limited distribution in Canada, it is listed under Ontario's Endangered Species Act, 2007, which protects the species and its habitat. One Ontario population of the wood poppy is in a conservation area.
