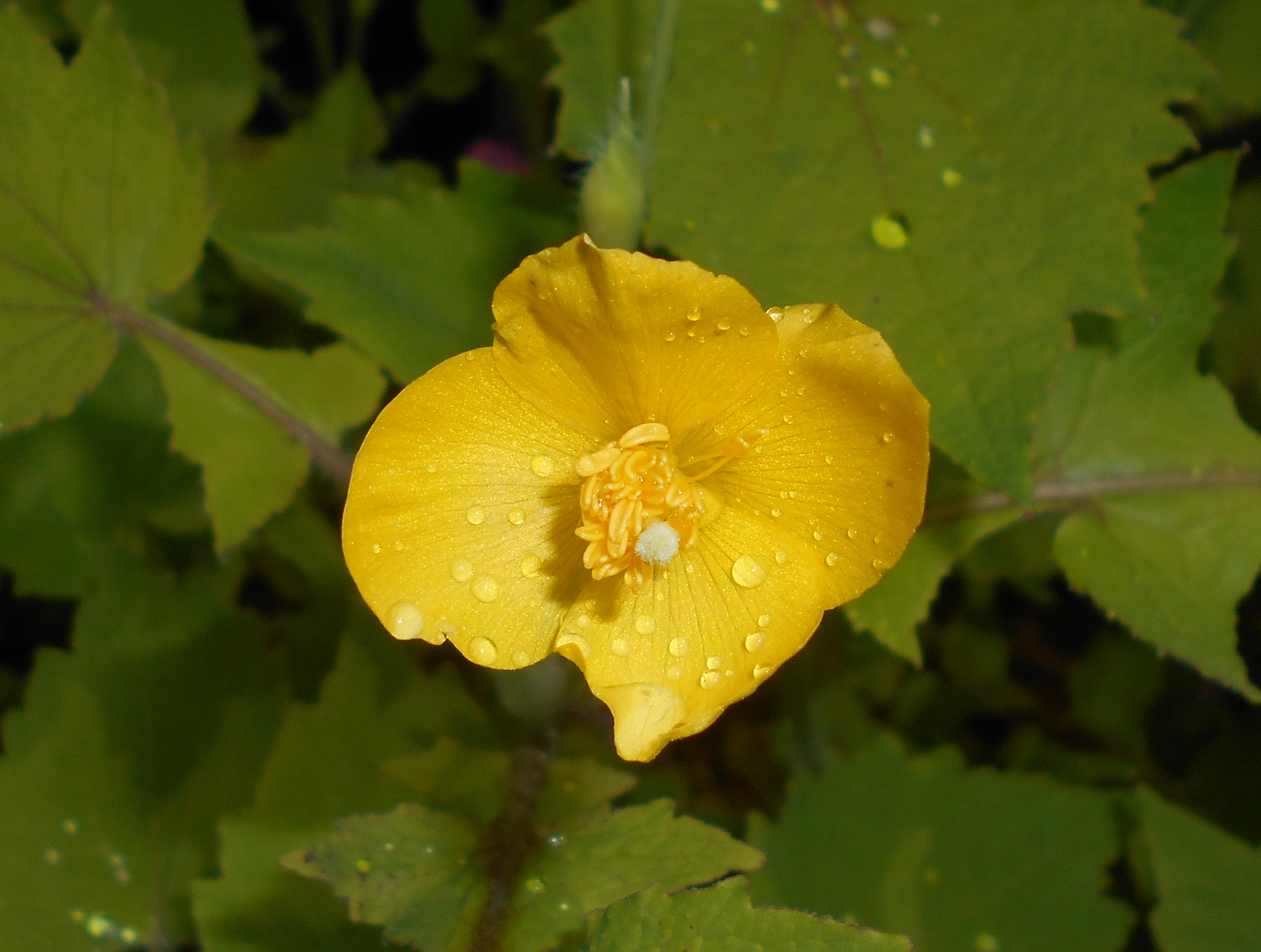
- Close-up of flower
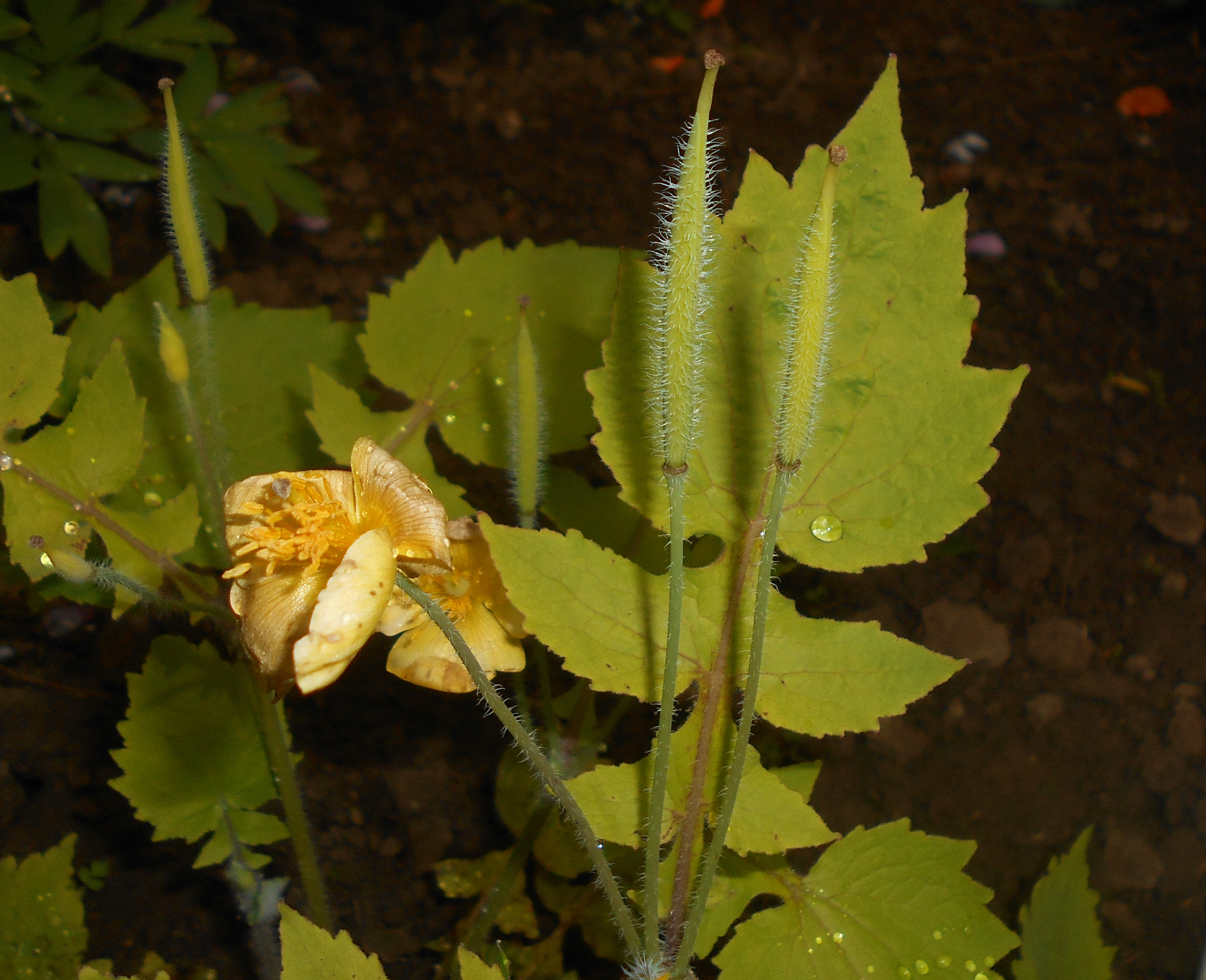
- Spent flower and new buds

Scientific classification
- Kingdom: Plantae
- Clade: Embryophytes
- Clade: Tracheophytes
- Clade: Spermatophytes
- Clade: Angiosperms
- Clade: Eudicots
- Order: Ranunculales
- Family: Papaveraceae
- Genus: Stylophorum
- Species: S. lasiocarpum

Binomial name
- Stylophorum lasiocarpum (Oliv.) Fedde

Synonyms
- Chelidonium lasiocarpum Oliv.

= Stylophorum lasiocarpum =

Species of flowering plant

Stylophorum lasiocarpum, the Chinese celandine poppy, is a species of flowering plant in the family Papaveraceae, native to central China. A biennial or short-lived perennial reaching 45 cm (1.5 ft), it is hardy to USDA zone 4, and is readily available from commercial suppliers. It produces a succession of yellow flowers from late spring to late summer, and its seed capsules explosively release their seeds when ripe.
