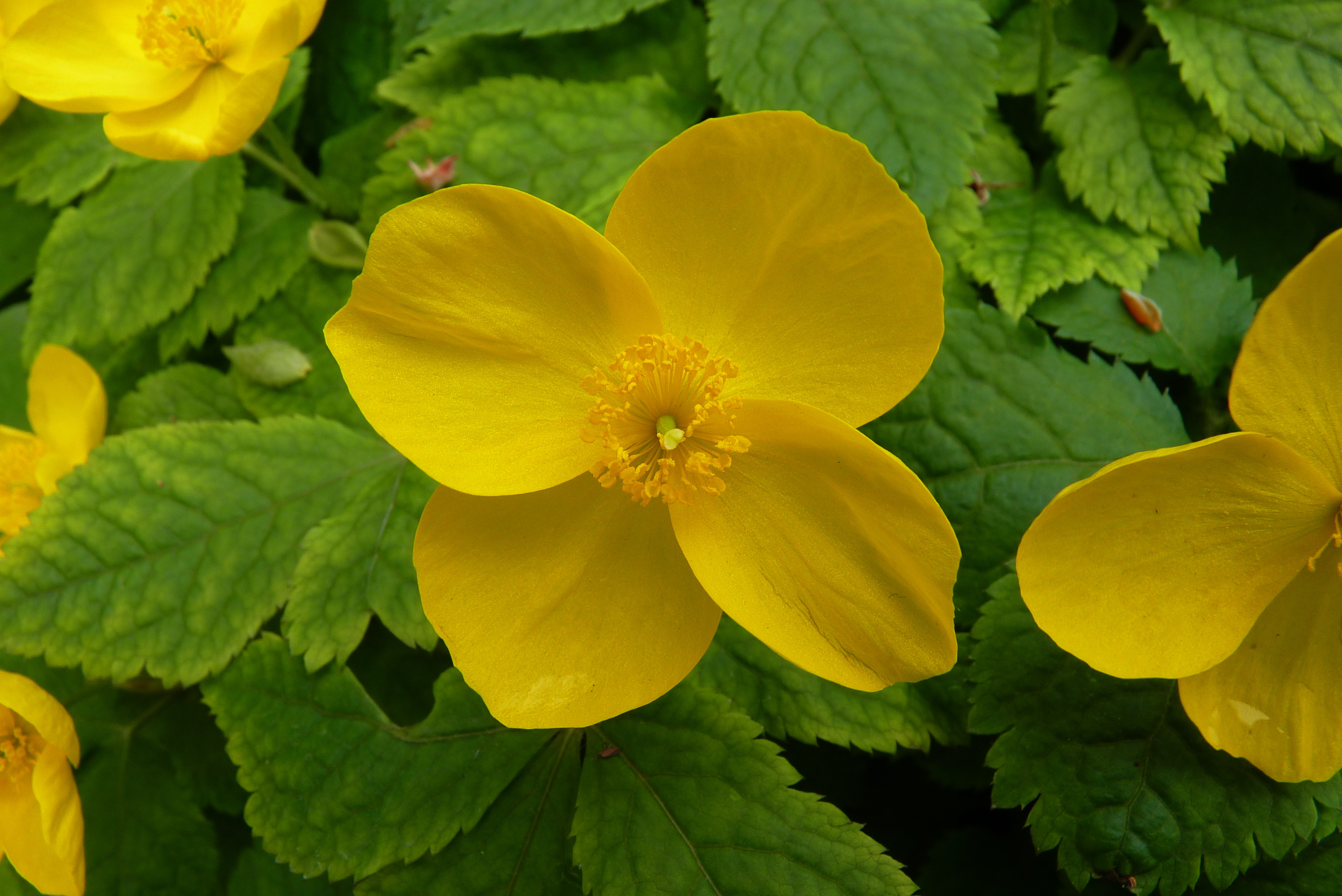

Scientific classification
- Kingdom: Plantae
- Clade: Tracheophytes
- Clade: Angiosperms
- Clade: Eudicots
- Order: Ranunculales
- Family: Papaveraceae
- Genus: Hylomecon
- Species: H. japonica

Binomial name
- Hylomecon japonica (Thunb.) Prantl

Synonyms
- Chelidonium japonicum Thunb.; Stylophorum japonicum (Thunb.) Miq.

= Hylomecon japonica =

Species of plant

Hylomecon japonica is a species of flowering plant in the family Papaveraceae, native to China and Japan. It was first described by Carl Peter Thunberg in 1784 as Chelidonium japonicum.
