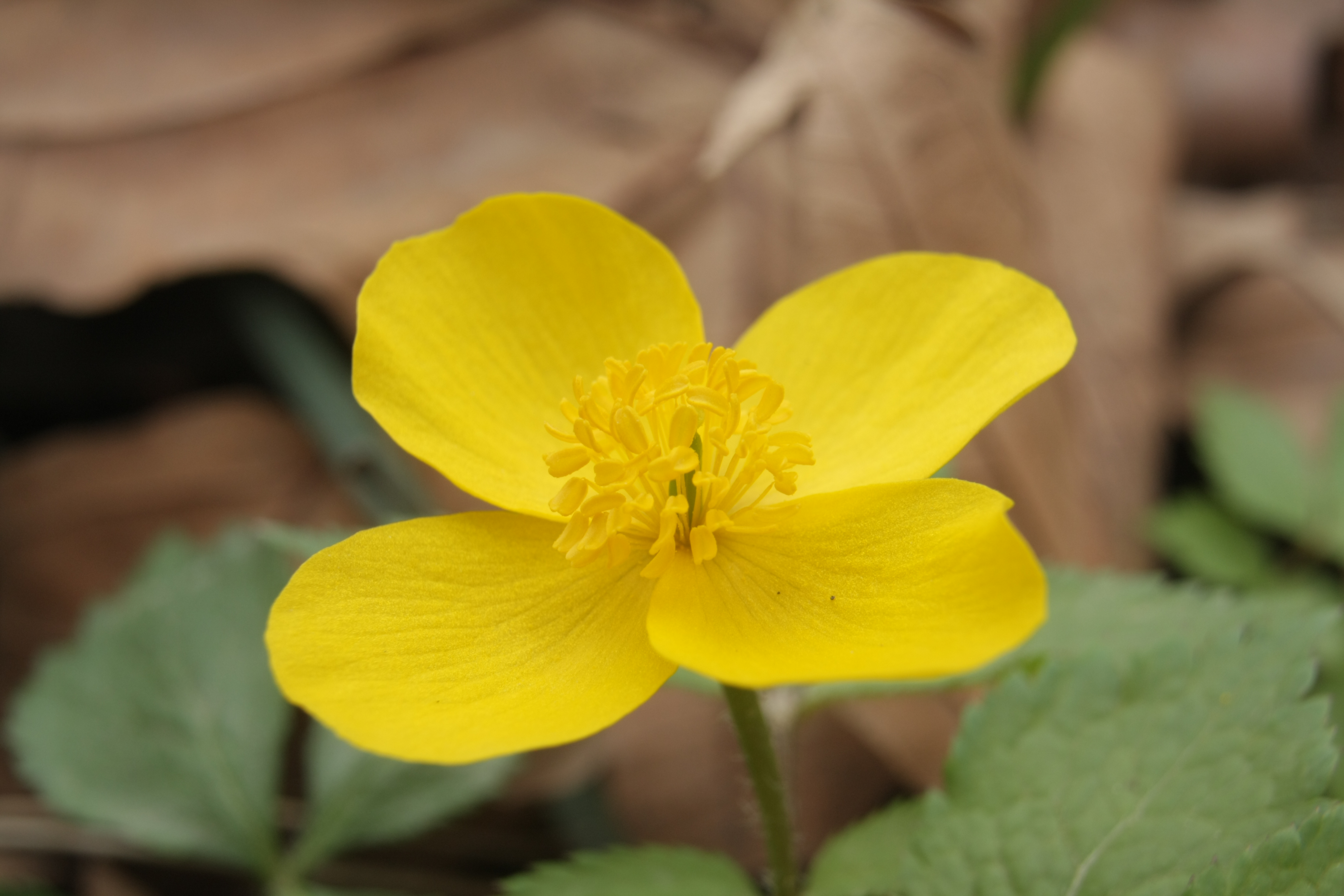

Scientific classification
- Kingdom: Plantae
- Clade: Tracheophytes
- Clade: Angiosperms
- Clade: Eudicots
- Order: Ranunculales
- Family: Papaveraceae
- Genus: Hylomecon
- Species: H. vernalis

Binomial name
- Hylomecon vernalis Maxim.

Synonyms
- Homotypic Synonyms: Chelidonium vernale (Maxim.) Ohwi; Heterotypic Synonyms: Hylomecon vernalis f. albilutescens Y.N.Lee; Hylomecon vernalis var. sasundaeensis Y.N.Lee

= Hylomecon vernalis =

Species of plant

Hylomecon vernalis is a species of flowering plant in the family Papaveraceae. It is native to China, Korea and the Russian Far East. It was first described by Karl Maximovich in 1859. It is known as the forest poppy.

== Description ==
This poppy is a perennial that spreads via rhizomes, typically no taller than 30 cm. The pinnate leaves usually have five soft green leaflets, although three and seven occur as well, each with a shape ranging from lanceolate-oblong to rhombic, and a pattern of distinct teeth along the margins. The flowers are bright yellow 3.5–5 cm across, starting out bowl-shaped, then flattening out with age.

== Habitat ==
Its typical habitat is moist shaded woodland, growing in accumulated humus.
