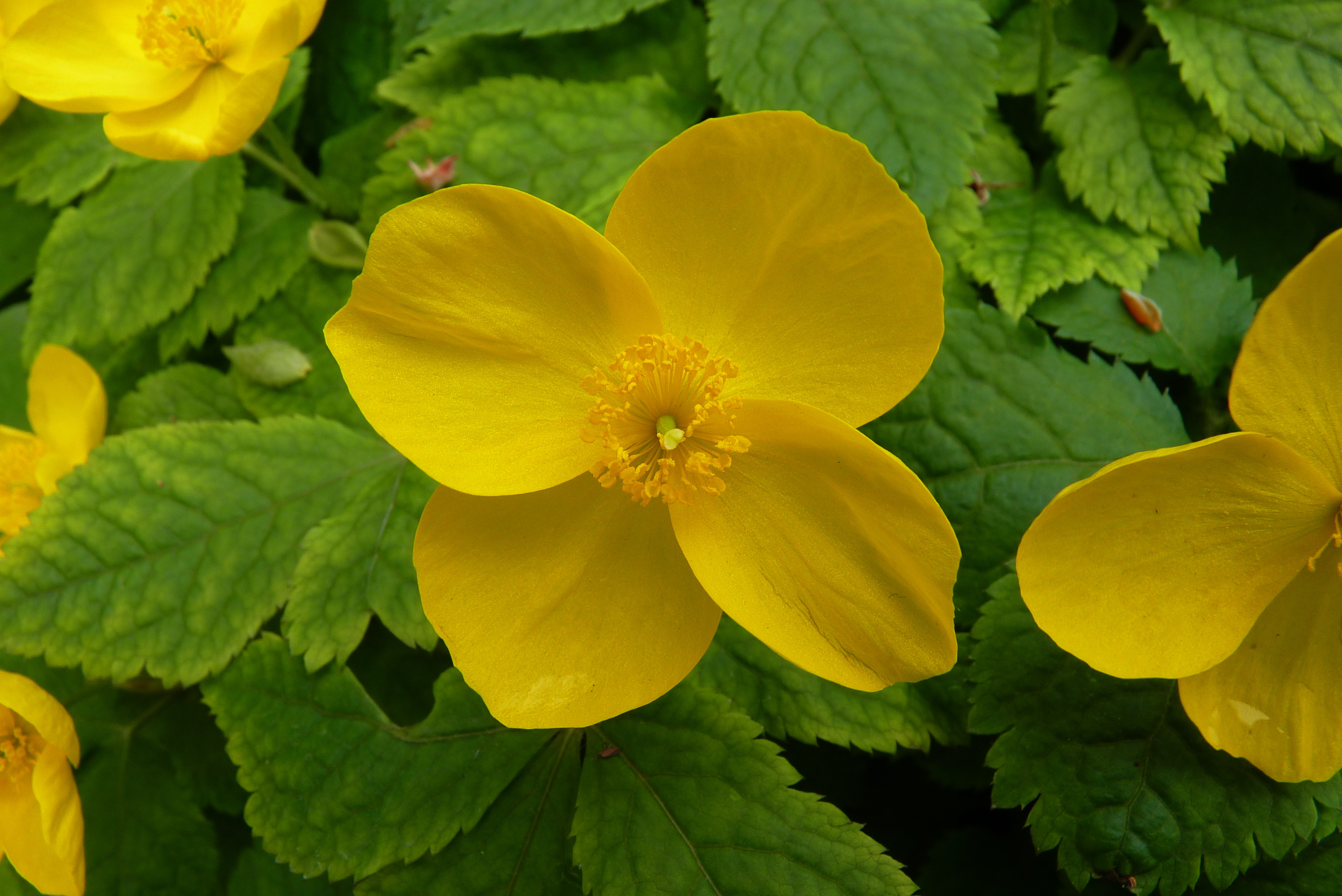
- Hylomecon japonica

Scientific classification
- Kingdom: Plantae
- Clade: Tracheophytes
- Clade: Angiosperms
- Clade: Eudicots
- Order: Ranunculales
- Family: Papaveraceae
- Subfamily: Papaveroideae
- Tribe: Chelidonieae
- Genus: Hylomecon; Maxim.

= Hylomecon =

Genus of flowering plants

Hylomecon is a genus of flowering plants in the family Papaveraceae. Its species are native to China, Korea, Japan and the Russian Far East.

== Species ==
As of February 2024, Plants of the World Online accepted two species:

- Hylomecon japonica (Thunb.) Prantl
- Hylomecon vernalis Maxim.
