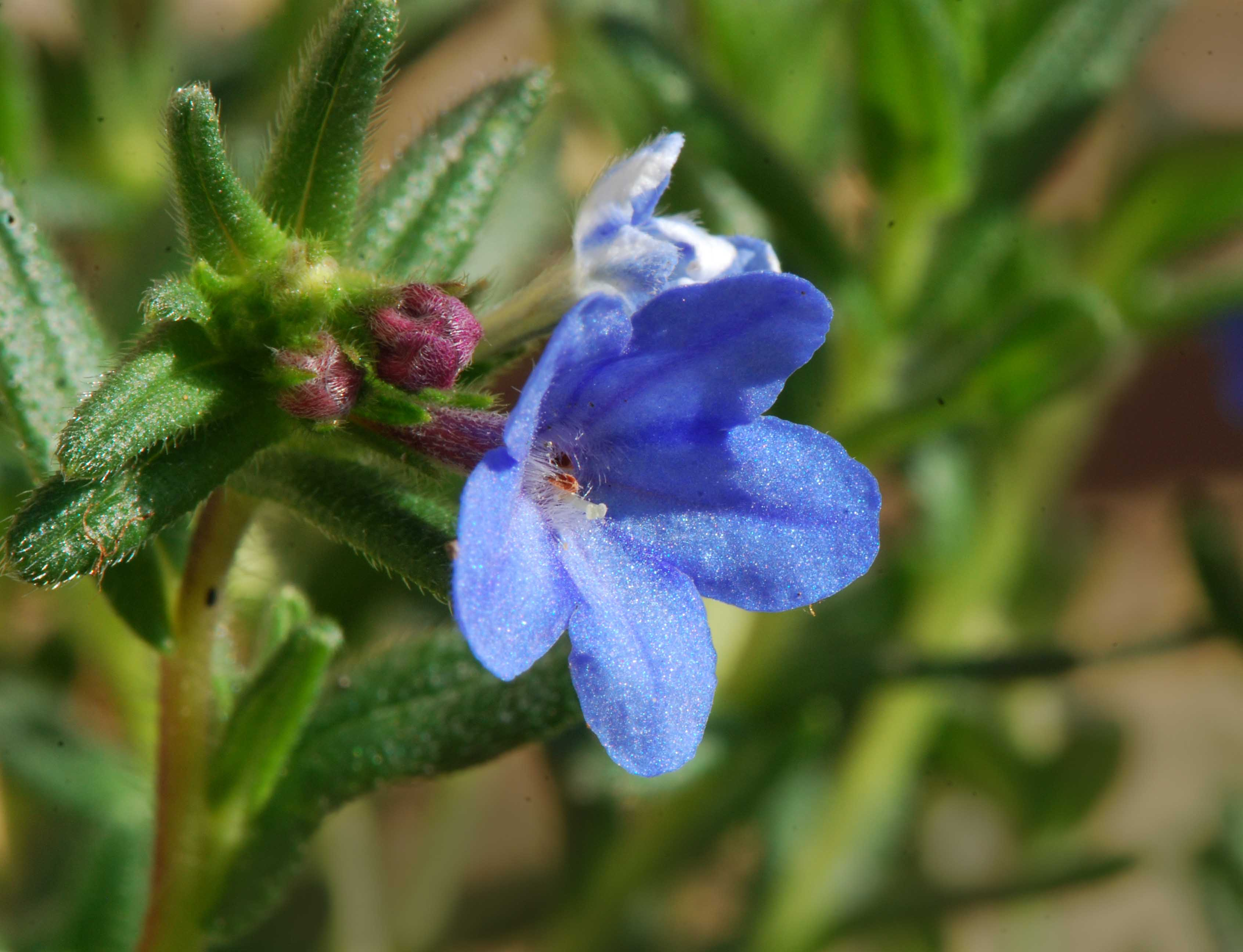

Scientific classification
- Kingdom: Plantae
- Clade: Tracheophytes
- Clade: Angiosperms
- Clade: Eudicots
- Clade: Asterids
- Order: Boraginales
- Family: Boraginaceae
- Genus: Glandora
- Species: G. prostrata

Binomial name
- Glandora prostrata (Loisel.) D.C.Thomas

Synonyms
- List: Glandora prostrata var. bicolor Blanco-Dios; Lithodora prostrata (Loisel.) Griseb.; Lithospermum prostratum Loisel.; Rhytispermum prostratum Link

= Glandora prostrata =

Species of plant in the genus Glandora

Glandora prostrata, the shrubby gromwell, creeping gromwell or purple gromwell (names it shares with Lithospermum purpurocaeruleum and Glandora diffusa), is a species of Glandora native to Portugal, Spain and France. Its cultivars 'Grace Ward' and 'Heavenly Blue' have gained the Royal Horticultural Society's Award of Garden Merit.

== Subspecies ==
A subspecies is currently accepted:

- Glandora prostrata subsp. lusitanica (Samp.) D.C.Thomas
