= L. nitida =

L. nitida may refer to:

- Lithodora nitida, a plant species endemic to Spain
- Lonicera nitida, a shrub species found in China
- Livistona nitida, a palm tree species in genus Livistona

== See also ==
- Nitida (disambiguation)
