= Glandora nitida =

Conservation status
- Endangered (IUCN 3.1)

Scientific classification
- Kingdom: Plantae
- Clade: Tracheophytes
- Clade: Angiosperms
- Clade: Eudicots
- Clade: Asterids
- Order: Boraginales
- Family: Boraginaceae
- Genus: Glandora
- Species: G. nitida

Binomial name
- Glandora nitida (Ern) D.C.Thomas

Synonyms
- Lithodora nitida

Species of flowering plant

Glandora nitida is a species of flowering plant in the family Boraginaceae. It is endemic to Spain. It is known by the common name viniebla azul.

This species is known from just a few mountain ranges. It occurs in thickets on rocky or sandy dolomite soils. It is associated with species such as Convolvulus boissieri, Pterocephalus spathulatus, Helianthemum frigidulum, Hormathophylla lapeyrousiana, Centaurea granatensis, Thymus granatensis, Sideritis incana, Viola cazorlensis, Erinacea anthyllis, Echinospartum boissieri, Genista longipes, and Vella spinosa.

The species is threatened by grazing and fire.
