= Vella castrilensis =

Scientific classification
- Kingdom: Plantae
- Clade: Tracheophytes
- Clade: Angiosperms
- Clade: Eudicots
- Clade: Rosids
- Order: Brassicales
- Family: Brassicaceae
- Genus: Vella
- Species: V. castrilensis

Binomial name
- Vella castrilensis Vivero, Prados, Hern.-Berm., M.B.Crespo, S.Ríos & Lledó

Species of flowering plant

Vella castrilensis is a species of flowering plant in the mustard family (Brassicaceae), which is native to the Iberian Peninsula. It was first described by Jose Luis Vivero Pol et. al. in 2005.

== Description ==
Vella castrilensis grows as a cushion-like shrub of up to 30 cm (12 in) height. Stems bear no spines and are somewhat woody at the base. They arise close together and are multi-branched. In the beginning the stems are green but turn whitish later. This color comes from many tiny bristle-like trichomes that point in the same direction and lay close to the stem. Due to this they feel rough to the touch. Leaf margins are mostly entire but may rarely have 2-4 small teeth. The leaf shape changes from the base upward, with lower leaves being shorter, oblong and blunt-tipped; while the upper leaves are longer, more lanceolate and acute.

When flowering, V. castrilensis develops an in inflorescence in form of a raceme, with 4-10 flowers. Each flower follows the characteristic Brassicaceae formula. Petals are 11–16.5 cm (4.3–6.5 in) long, yellow (becoming whitish later) and have prominent brown to purple veins. Sepals are covered in curved trichomes, have a triangular tip with a very narrow scarious margin. After flowering the fruit develops in form of a silicle, which is divided into two segments. The seed-bearing lower part is nearly spherical, usually contains two seeds in each valve and has a very pronounced net-like venation. It is also covered in longer and shorter trichomes. The upper segment resembles a flattened beak, is sterile and at the base almost as wide as the upper part.

Chromosome number is 2n = 68.

== Ecology and distribution ==
Vella castrilensis is endemic to southern Spain, where it occurs 1650-1900 m.a.s.l. in the mountain ranges of the Baetic System. Its distribution is limited only to a small area of about 1 km^{2} (0.39 sq mi) in the Sierras de Cazorla, Segura y Las Villas Natural Park. There it grows on stony clayish-calcareous soil. Habitats are influenced by strong winds and covered by snow for extended periods of the year, up to six month. V. castrilensis flowers from March to June.

== Conservation ==
Since Vella castrilensis is only found in a small area with estimated 20,000 specimen its proposed IUCN assessment is critically endangered. However, the IUCN has not listed this species in its Red List. The species is threatened by over-grazing of wild deer, domestic sheep and goats. To prevent this, fencing the area was considered as a suitable measure.
