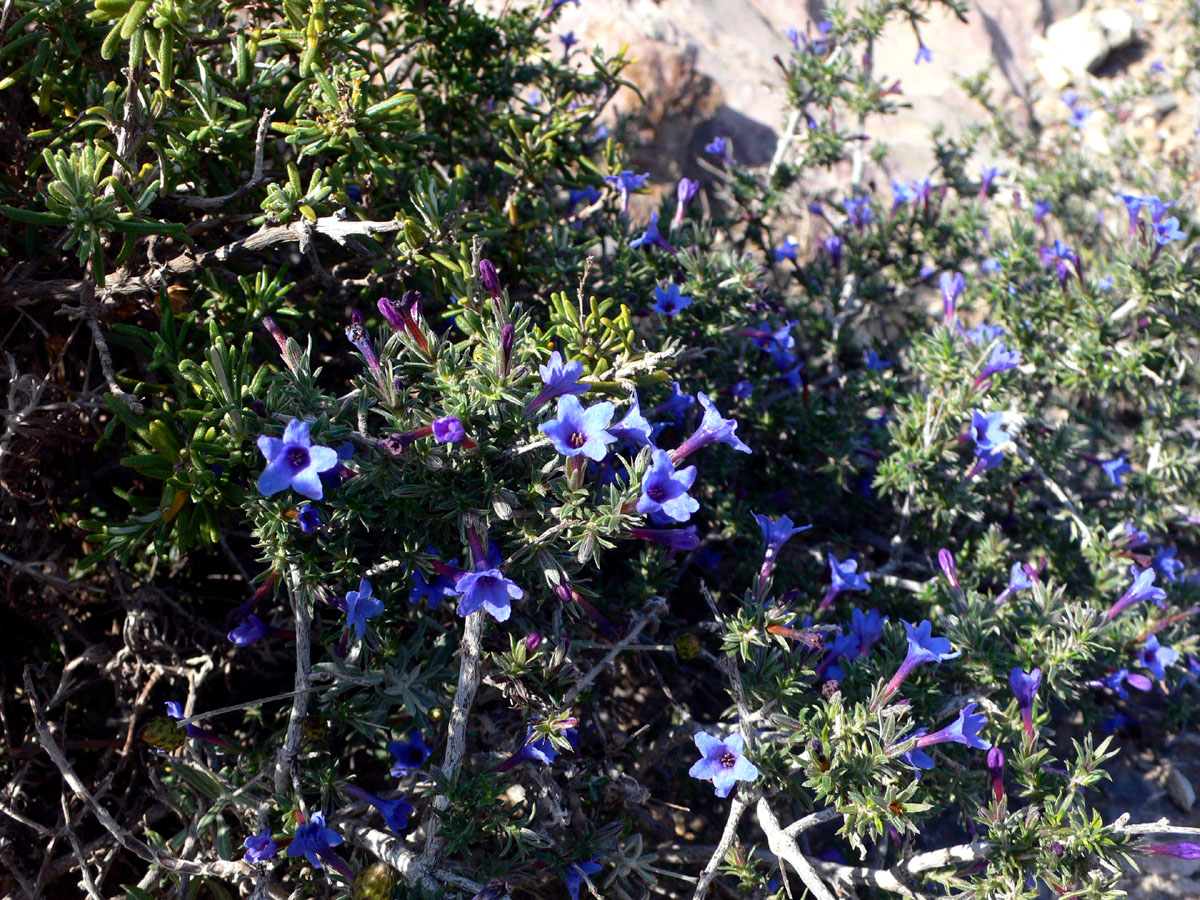

Scientific classification
- Kingdom: Plantae
- Clade: Tracheophytes
- Clade: Angiosperms
- Clade: Eudicots
- Clade: Asterids
- Order: Boraginales
- Family: Boraginaceae
- Genus: Lithodora
- Species: L. fruticosa

Binomial name
- Lithodora fruticosa (L.) Griseb.

Synonyms
- Margarospermum fruticosum Fourr. Lithospermum fruticosum L.

= Lithodora fruticosa =

Shrubby gromwell

Species of shrub

Lithodora fruticosa, or the shrubby gromwell, is a small 15–60 cm high densely branched perennial shrub. Its erect young stems are covered with short white hairs, while Its older stems have peeling grey bark and are frequently gnarled and twisted. The up to 25 mm long alternate leaves have a covering of flattened hairs and as they grow older they often develop small raised nodules or tubercules particularly near their edges which are downturned. The flowers which are about 15 mm long, vary in colour from violet to an intense blue, with a long petal tube, corolla tubes hairless on outside and only sparsely bristly-haired on the outside of the corolla lobes. Flowers from March to May. The hairy calyx has 5 lobes joined only near the base. The nutlets are up to 4 mm long.

== Habitat ==
Dry ground, stony hillsides usually on limestone.

== Distribution ==
France, Portugal, Spain, Morocco and Algeria.

== Gallery ==
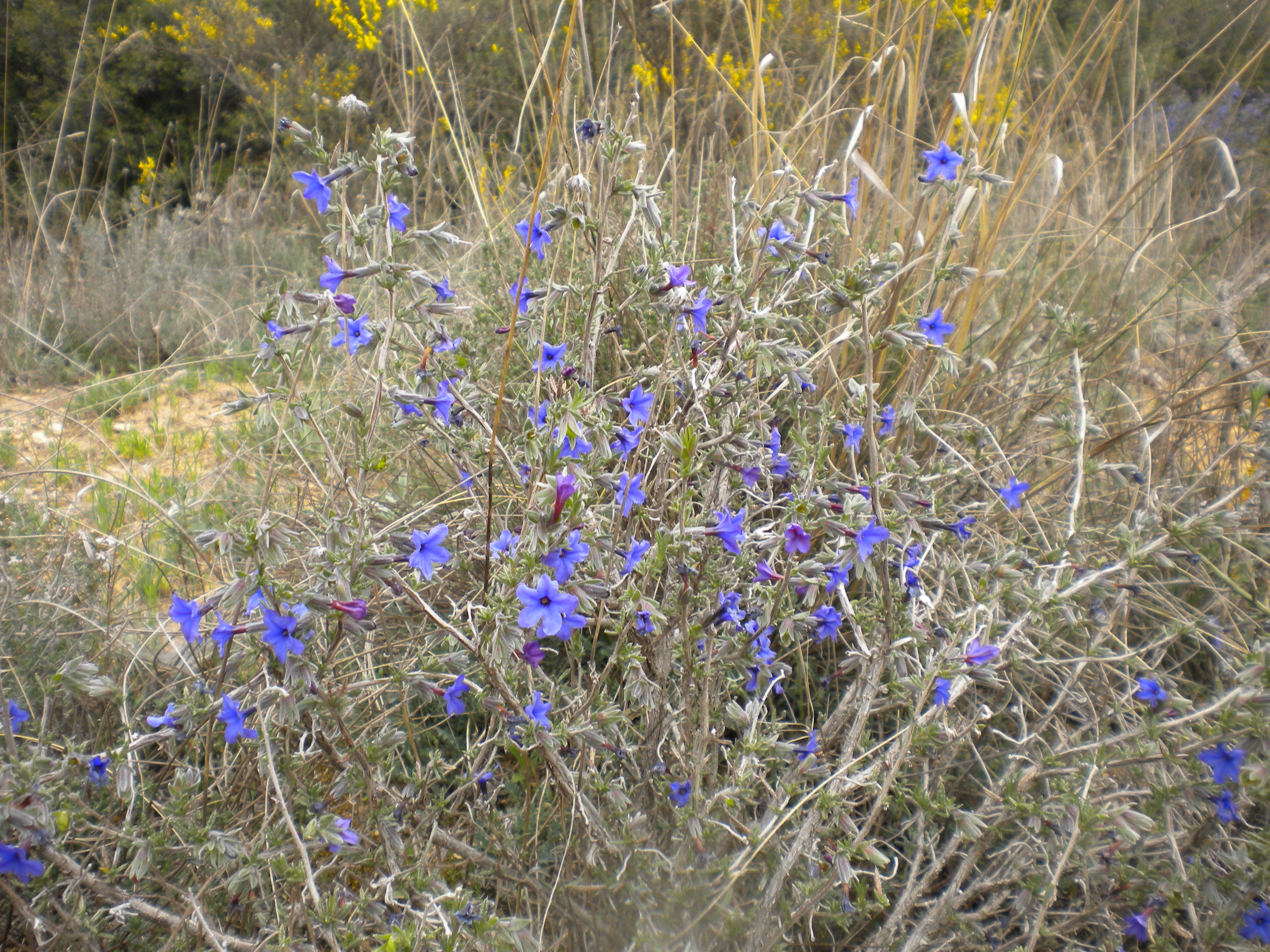

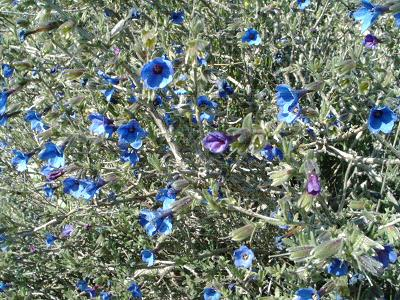

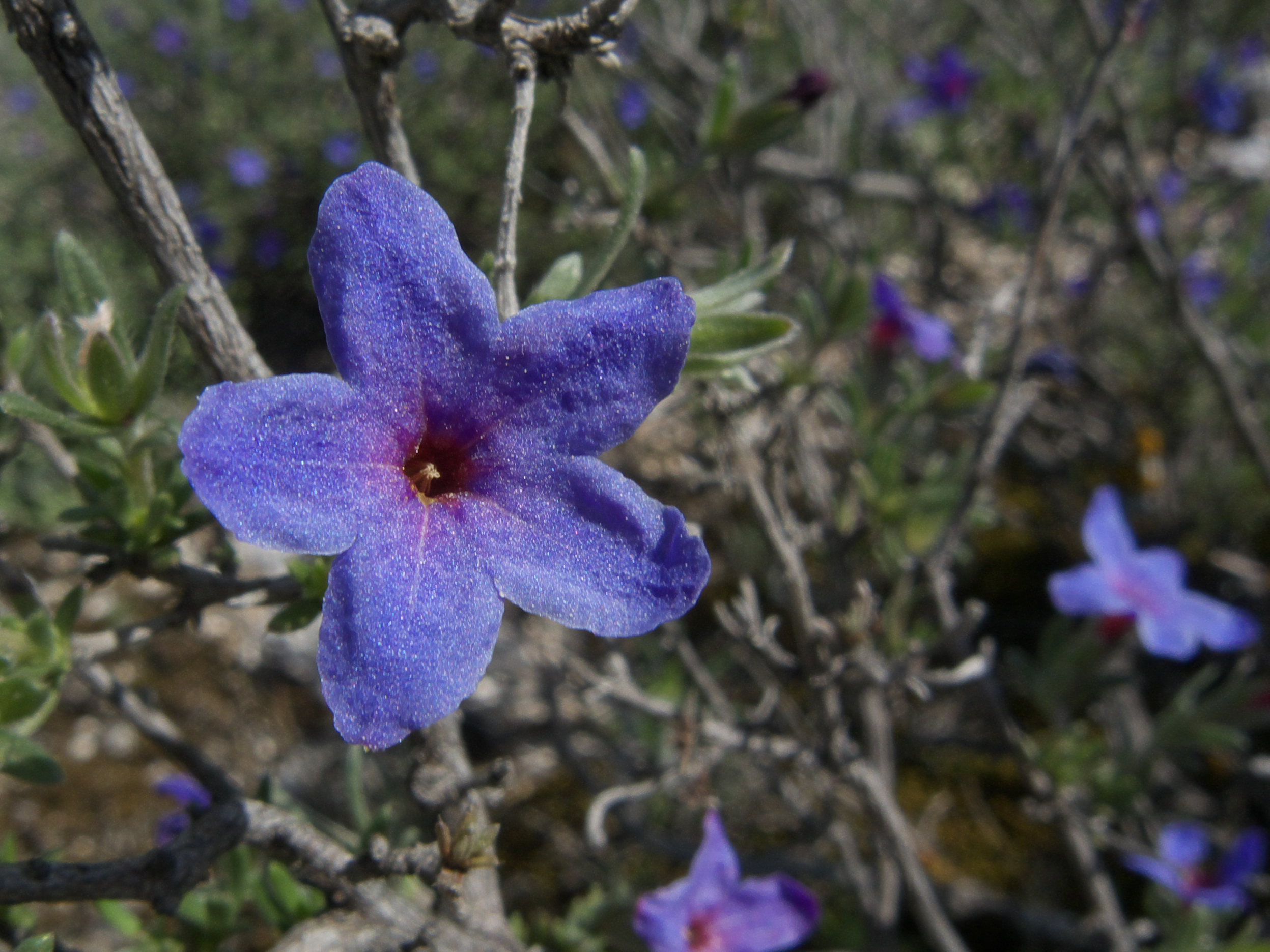
