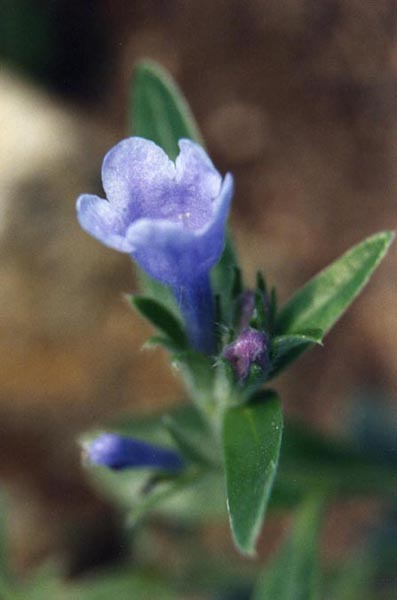

Scientific classification
- Kingdom: Plantae
- Clade: Embryophytes
- Clade: Tracheophytes
- Clade: Angiosperms
- Clade: Eudicots
- Clade: Asterids
- Order: Boraginales
- Family: Boraginaceae
- Genus: Glandora
- Species: G. oleifolia

Binomial name
- Glandora oleifolia (Lapeyr.) D.C.Thomas

= Glandora oleifolia =

Species of flowering plant

Glandora oleifolia (Lapeyr.) D.C.Thomas, the olive-leaved gromwell (syn. Lithodora oleifolia, Lithospermum oleifolium), is a species of flowering plant in the family Boraginaceae. The plant is native to a small rocky area near Figueras in the eastern Pyrenees, and is endemic to Spain.

== Description ==
Glandora oleifolia is a lax and low evergreen sub-shrub growing to 20 cm (8 in) tall by 30 cm (12 in) or more wide. It has silky dark green leaves, similar to olive (Olea europaea) leaves in shape. The plant produces sky-blue 5-lobed flowers.

== Cultivation ==
Glandora oleifolia is cultivated as an ornamental plant. In gardens it prefers an alkaline soil. It has gained the Royal Horticultural Society's Award of Garden Merit

== Taxonomy ==
Its former name in Latin, lithodora, literally means "stone gift", referring to its preference for rocky places. The term oleifolia means "olive leaved", though it is not closely related to the true olives.
