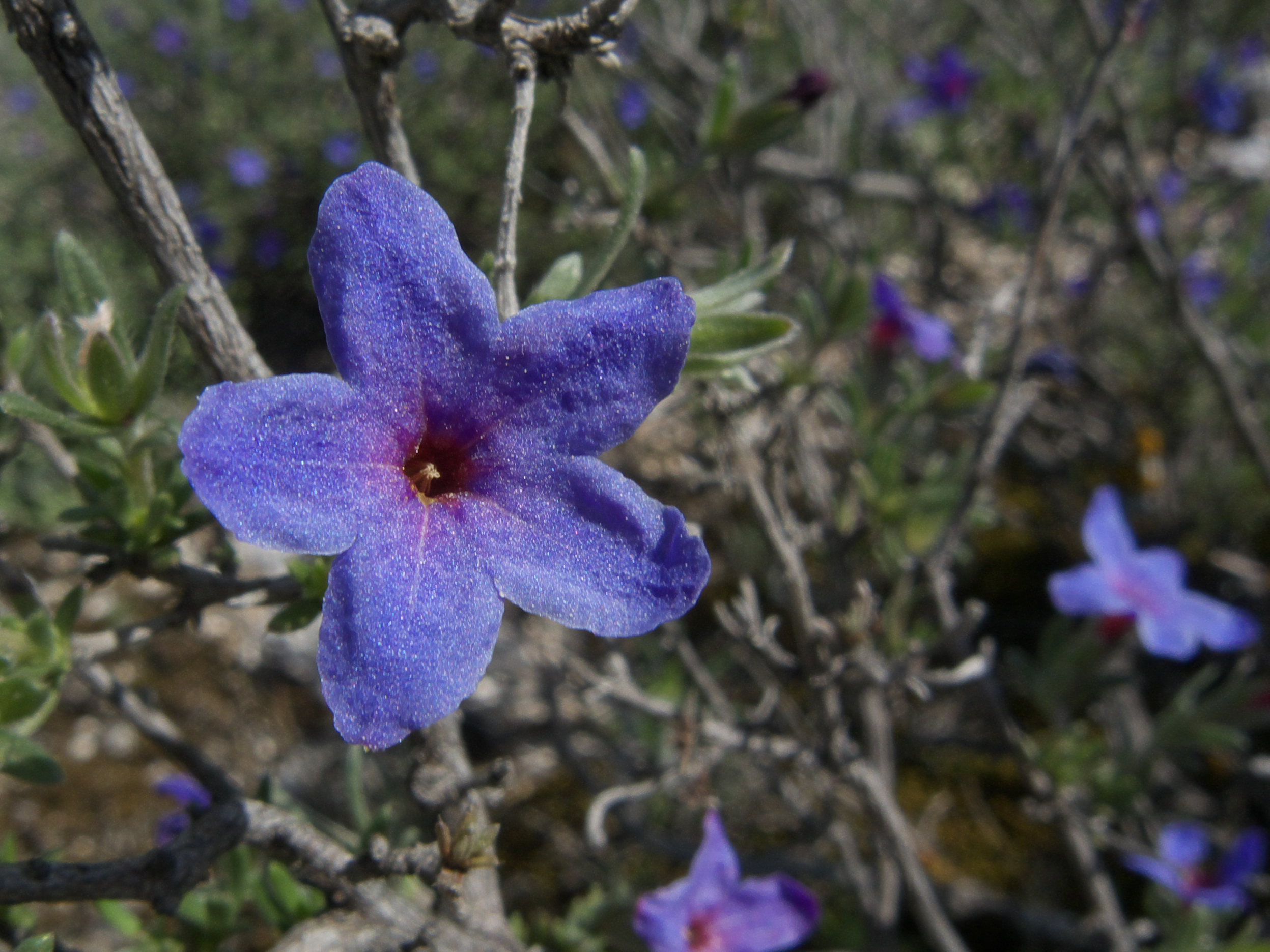
- Lithodora fruticosa

Scientific classification
- Kingdom: Plantae
- Clade: Tracheophytes
- Clade: Angiosperms
- Clade: Eudicots
- Clade: Asterids
- Order: Boraginales
- Family: Boraginaceae
- Subfamily: Boraginoideae
- Genus: Lithodora; Griseb.

= Lithodora =

Genus of flowering plants in the borage family

Lithodora is a genus of flowering plants in the family Boraginaceae, native to southwestern Europe, southern Greece, Turkey and Algeria. They are low-growing, evergreen shrubs and subshrubs, producing 5-lobed blue or white flowers. The Greek lithodora literally means "stone gift", referring to the plant's preferred rocky habitats. The genus Glandora was split from Lithodora in 2008.

Lithodora species are often cultivated as ornamental plants which are especially suited to rock gardens or raised beds.

== Species ==
Three species are accepted.

- Lithodora fruticosa (L.) Griseb.
- Lithodora hispidula (Sm.) Griseb.
- Lithodora zahnii (Heldr. ex Halácsy) I.M.Johnst.
