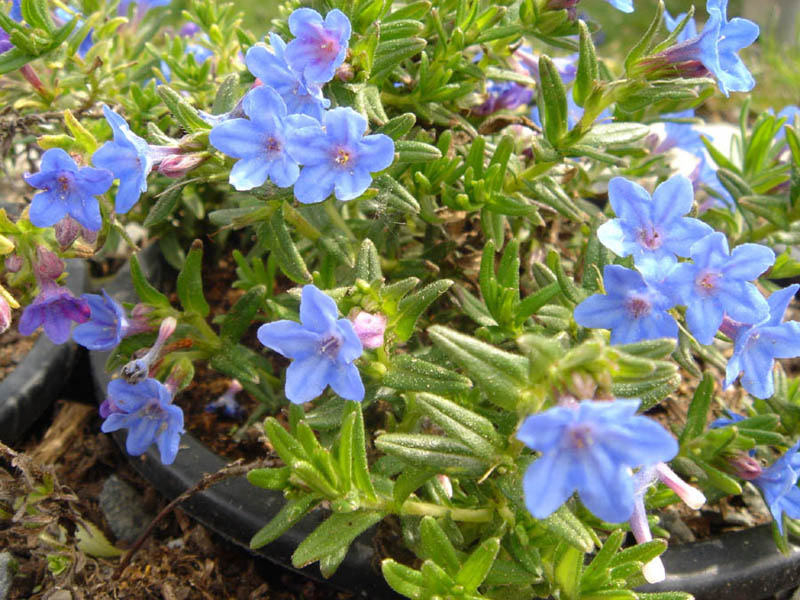
- Glandora diffusa here given as Lithodora diffusa

Scientific classification
- Kingdom: Plantae
- Clade: Tracheophytes
- Clade: Angiosperms
- Clade: Eudicots
- Clade: Asterids
- Order: Boraginales
- Family: Boraginaceae
- Subfamily: Boraginoideae
- Tribe: Lithospermeae
- Genus: Glandora; D.C.Thomas, Weigend & Hilger

Species
- See text

= Glandora =

Genus of Boraginaceae plants

Glandora is a genus of flowering plants in the family Boraginaceae, native to the western and central Mediterranean region; Morocco, Algeria, Portugal, Spain, France, Italy and Greece. It was split from Lithodora in 2008.

== Species ==
Currently accepted species include:

- Glandora diffusa (Lag.) D.C.Thomas
- Glandora gastonii (Benth.) L.Cecchi & Selvi
- Glandora goulandrisiorum (Rech.f.) L.Cecchi & Selvi
- Glandora moroccana (I.M.Johnst.) D.C.Thomas
- Glandora nitida (Ern) D.C.Thomas
- Glandora oleifolia (Lapeyr.) D.C.Thomas
- Glandora prostrata (Loisel.) D.C.Thomas
- Glandora rosmarinifolia (Ten.) D.C.Thomas
