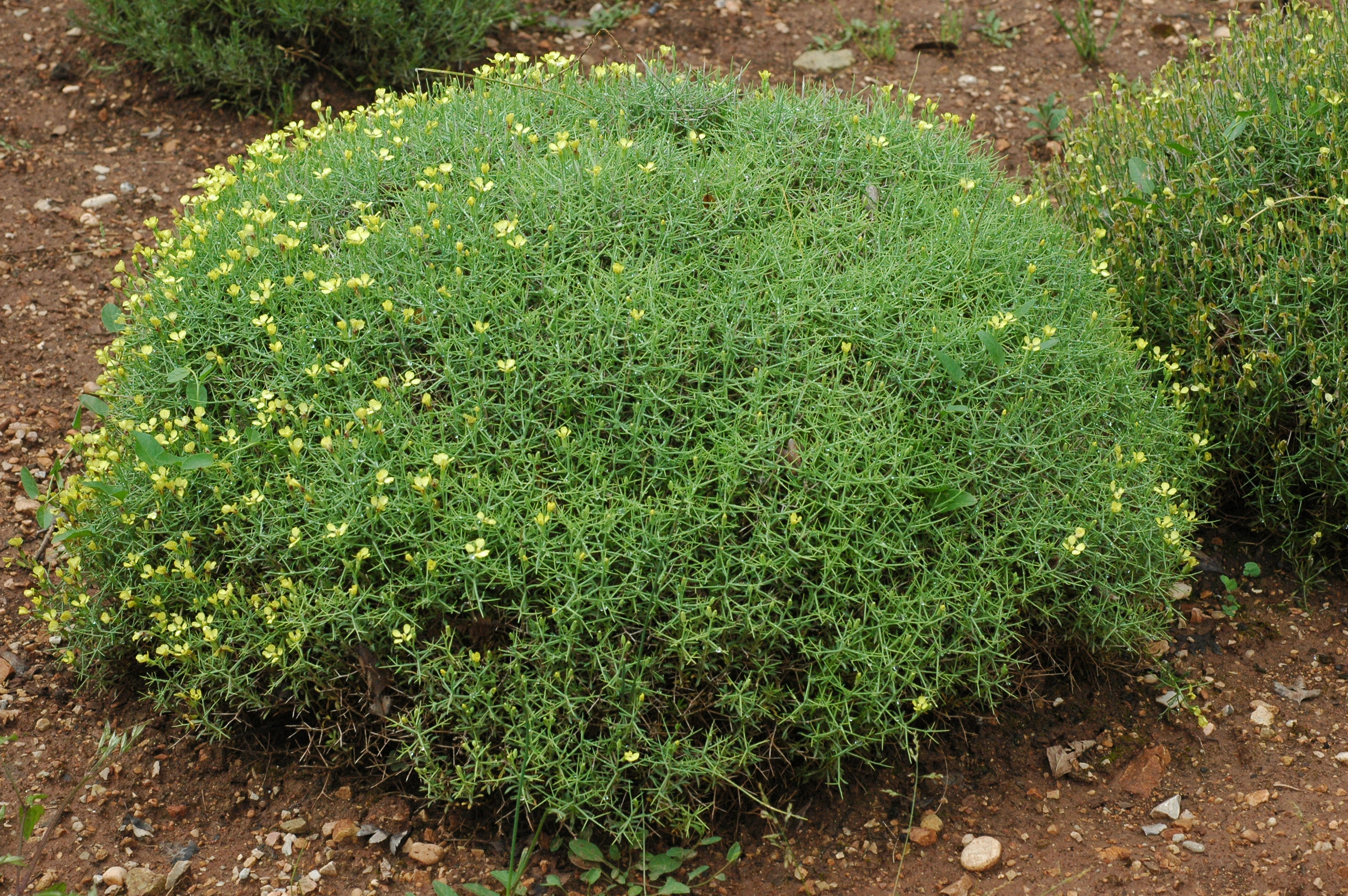
- Vella spinosa

Scientific classification
- Kingdom: Plantae
- Clade: Tracheophytes
- Clade: Angiosperms
- Clade: Eudicots
- Clade: Rosids
- Order: Brassicales
- Family: Brassicaceae
- Genus: Vella; L.

Species
- 8; see text

Synonyms
- Boleum Desv.; Carrichtera Adans.; Euzomodendron Coss.; Pseudocytisus Kuntze

= Vella (plant) =

Genus of flowering plants

Vella is a genus of flowering plants in the family Brassicaceae which includes eight species. Species are many branched, and have hairy, sessile, entire leaves that are narrower in width at their bases, widening out to form ovals. Fruits are stiff silicles with two differentiated segments, the lower fertile, valvate, ellipsoidal bears the seed in two chambers, which can have 0-5 visible veins. The upper sterile segment forms a compressed tongue- or beak-shaped structure. Vella species are native to Algeria, Morocco, and Spain.

== Species ==
Eight species are accepted.

- Vella anremerica (Lit. & Maire) Gómez-Campo
- Vella aspera Pers.
- Vella bourgaeana (Coss.) Warwick & Al-Shehbaz
- Vella castrilensis Vivero, Prados, Hern.-Berm., M.B.Crespo, S.Ríos & Lledó
- Vella lucentina M.B.Crespo
- Vella mairei Humbert
- Vella pseudocytisus L. (type)
- Vella spinosa Boiss.
