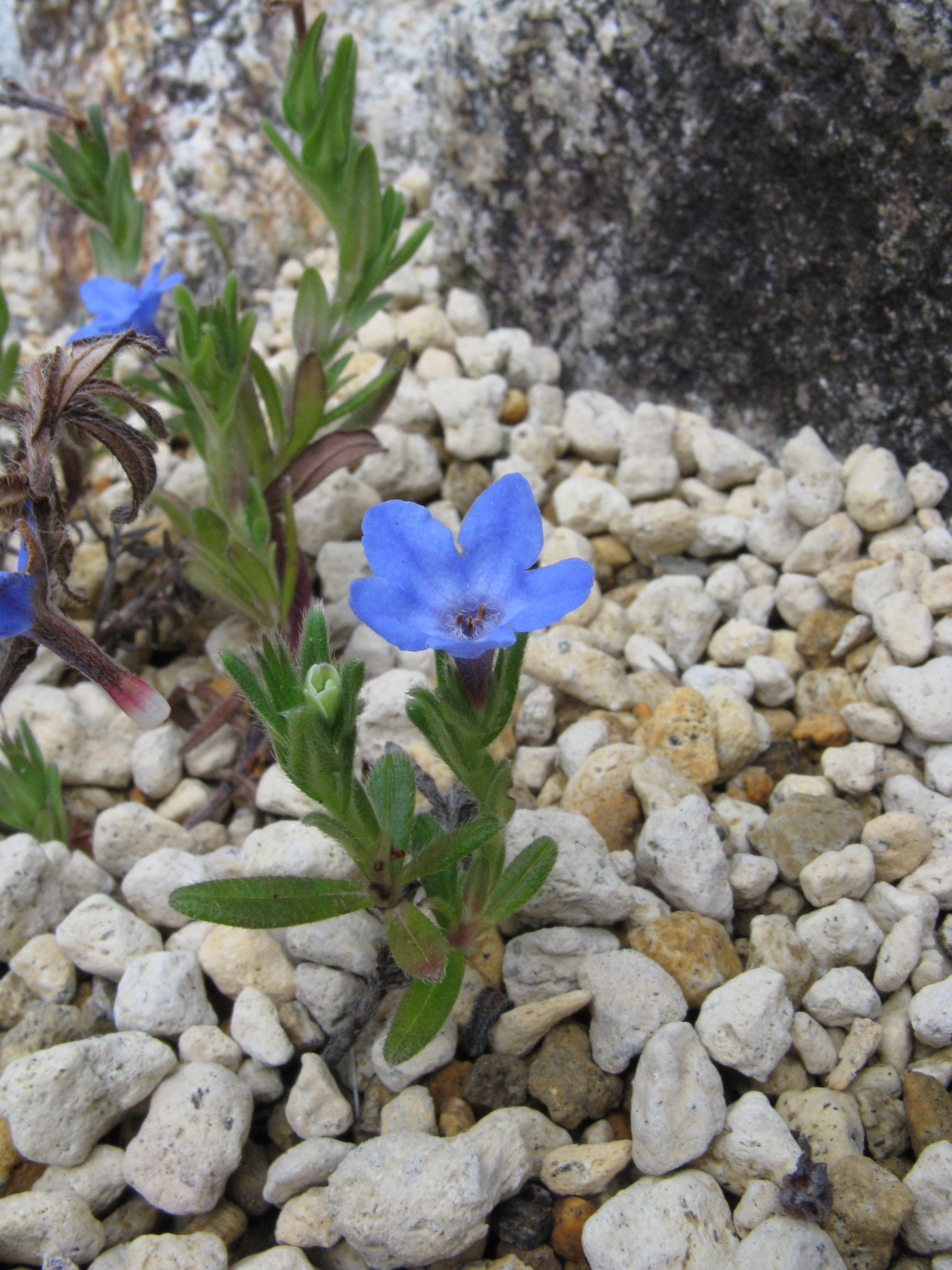
- G. diffusa, Osaka Prefectural Flower Garden, Japan

Scientific classification
- Kingdom: Plantae
- Clade: Tracheophytes
- Clade: Angiosperms
- Clade: Eudicots
- Clade: Asterids
- Order: Boraginales
- Family: Boraginaceae
- Genus: Glandora
- Species: G. diffusa

Binomial name
- Glandora diffusa (Lag. ) I.M.Johnst.

= Glandora diffusa =

Species of flowering plant

Glandora diffusa, the purple gromwell, syn. Lithodora diffusa, Lithospermum diffusa, is a species of flowering plant in the family Boraginaceae. It is a mat-forming perennial growing to 15 cm (6 in) tall by 60 cm (24 in) or more wide, with dark green, hairy evergreen leaves and masses of blue or white 5-lobed flowers. It is suitable for cultivation in a rock garden or alpine garden.

Although there is a variety with white flowers, G. diffusa var. alba, the blue-flowered varieties are most valued in gardens for the intense azure color of their abundant blooms. A number of cultivars have been developed for garden use.

Glandora diffusa is hardy down to −23 °C (−9 °F) (USDA zones 6 - 8), and requires a position in full sun. It needs a well-drained acid or neutral soil, as it is susceptible to root rot. It requires vernalization to flower.

The ancient Greek term lithodora literally means "stone gift", referring to its preferred habitat. Diffusa means "spreading", and refers to the plant's growth habit.
