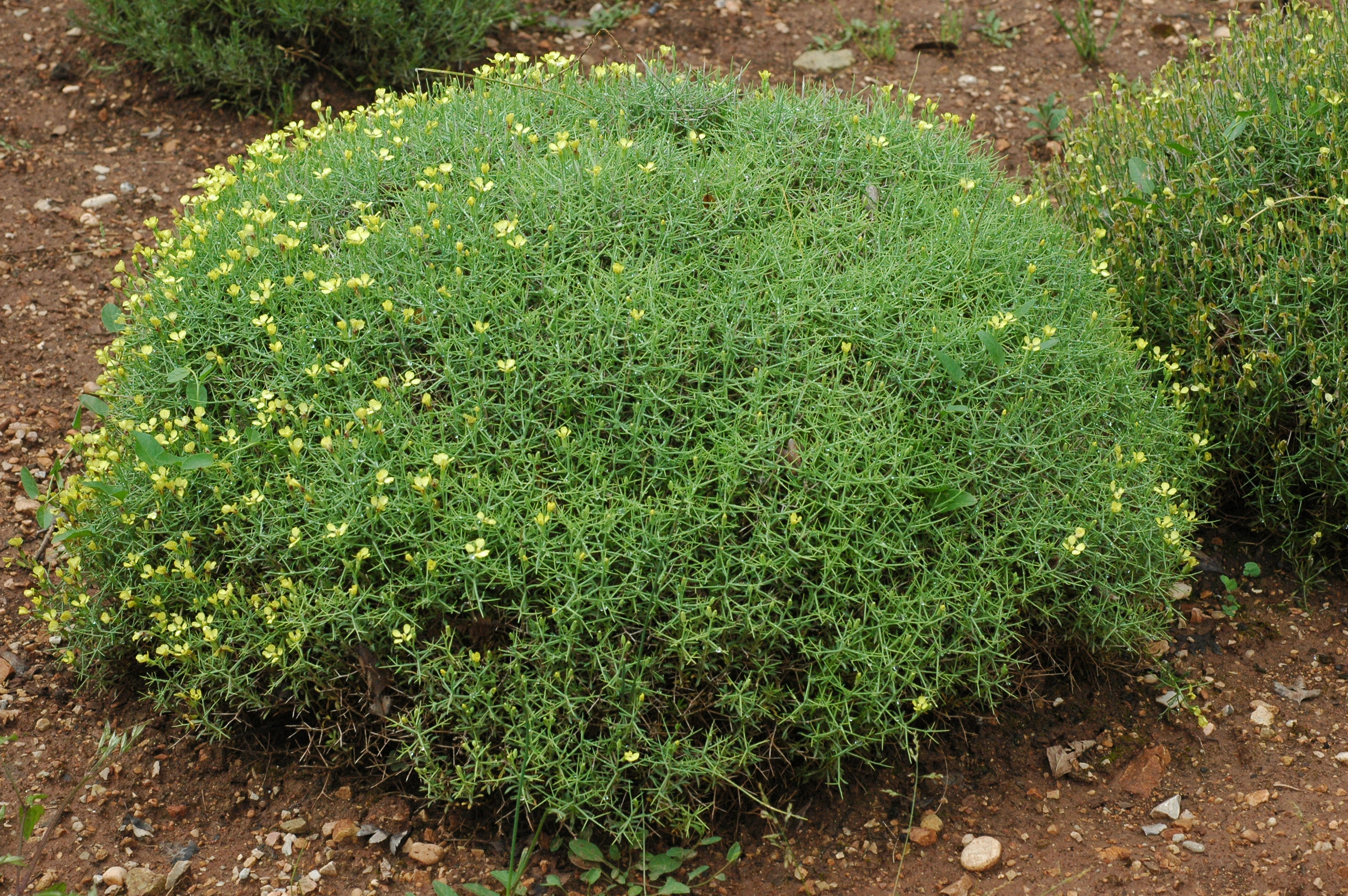

Scientific classification
- Kingdom: Plantae
- Clade: Tracheophytes
- Clade: Angiosperms
- Clade: Eudicots
- Clade: Rosids
- Order: Brassicales
- Family: Brassicaceae
- Genus: Vella
- Species: V. spinosa

Binomial name
- Vella spinosa Boissier

Synonyms
- Pseudocytisus spinosus (Boiss.) Rehder; Vella spinosa var. subglabra H.Lindb.

= Vella spinosa =

Species of flowering plant

Vella spinosa is a flowering plant belonging to the mustard family (Brassicaceae). It is native to the Iberian Peninsula, mostly southern Spain. It was first described by Pierre Edmond Boissier in 1838.

== Description ==
Flowers, side view.

Vella spinosa grows as a low shrub of 60–70 cm (24–28 in) height, forming characteristic cushions. Stems are somewhat woody at the base. Its many branches become more and more divided towards the top. From this branching pattern, slender, stiff, and spreading terminal spines emerge. Leaves are slightly fleshy, lower ones are clustered and oblong, while upper ones are narrow, linear and have fine hairs on the margins.

When flowering, an inflorescence in form of a single raceme develops usually with 3-5 flowers. These follow the typical brassicaceous family flower formula. The four yellow petals are clawed, with reddish veins running through them almost to the outer margin. After flowering a fruit develops as a hard silique with four prominent veins that end in a reticulate pattern. On top of the two chambers of the silique, two flat, hard, tongue-shaped sit. Inside each chamber (per locule) one round seed or sometimes two develop.

Its chromosome number is n = 17.

== Ecology and distribution ==
Vella spinosa is distributed over southern Spain, within its autonomous regions (Andalusia, Castilla-La Mancha, Valenicia, Murcia). There it grows throughout the mountains of the Baetic System, at elevations of 1,300–1,800 m (4,300–5,900 ft) asl. In this high mountain prostrate vegetation it can be found on dolomitic substrates, forming a cushion scrubland together with Genista longipes subsp. viciosoi. Flowering occurs from April to June.

== Gallery ==
Silique of Vella spinosa, Botanical Garden Berlin.

Cushion growth of Vella spinosa in the Botanischer Garten, Berlin-Dahlem.

Flowers of Vella spinosa in Botanical Garden Berlin.

Leaf morphology of Vella spinosa.
