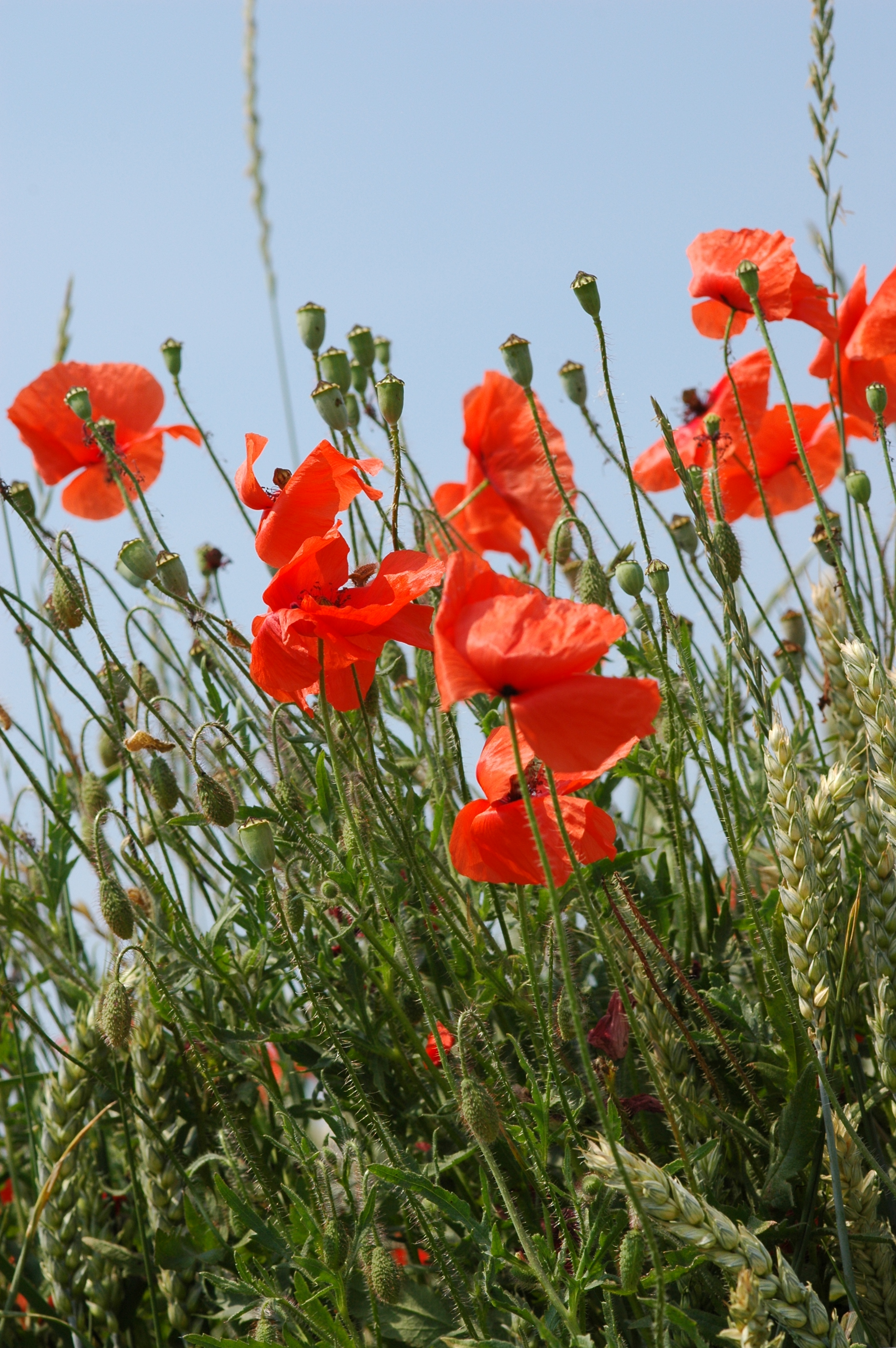
- Corn poppy (Papaver rhoeas)

Scientific classification
- Kingdom: Plantae
- Clade: Tracheophytes
- Clade: Angiosperms
- Clade: Eudicots
- Order: Ranunculales
- Family: Papaveraceae; Juss.

Genera
- See text

= Papaveraceae =

Family of flowering plants

The Papaveraceae (/pəˌpævəˈreɪsi.iː, -ˌaɪ/), informally called the poppy family, are an economically important family of about 42 genera and approximately 775 known species of flowering plants in the order Ranunculales. The family is cosmopolitan, occurring in temperate and subtropical climates (mostly in the northern hemisphere) like Eastern Asia as well as California in North America. It is almost unknown in the tropics. Most are herbaceous plants, but a few are shrubs and small trees. The family currently includes two groups that have been considered to be separate families: Fumariaceae and Pteridophyllaceae. Papaver is the classical name for poppy in Latin.

== Description ==
Papaveraceae are known for diverse and colorful flowers with distinctive sepals. The plants may be annual, biennial, or perennial. Usually herbaceous, a few species form shrubs or evergreen trees. All parts contain a well-developed system of latex ducts called "laticifers", that produce milky latex, a watery white, yellow or red juice.

The leaves are alternate or sometimes whorled and have petioles and no stipules. They are usually lobed or pinnatifid (i.e. consisting of several not entirely separate leaflets), or much divided.

The plants are hermaphroditic and pollinated mostly by insects (entomophilous), but nectaries are lacking. A few are wind pollinated (anemophilous). There is a distinct calyx and corolla, except in Macleaya where the corolla is lacking. The flowers are medium-sized or large. The terminal flowers are solitary in many species. In others the terminal inflorescence is cymose or racemose. The flowers are odourless and regular.

There are many stamens, mostly 16 to 60, arranged in two separate whorls, the outer one with stamens alternating with petals, the inner one opposite, or numerous in the subfamily Papaveroideae. The gynoecium consists of a compound pistil with 2 to 100 carpels. The ovary is superior and unilocular. The ovary is either stemless (sessile) or on a short stem (stipitate). The sepals of the plant typically number half of the petals; for example, two sepals accompany 4 petals or 3 sepals accompany 6 petals. The pistils and stamens are hidden inside the petals.

The non-fleshy fruit is usually a capsule, breaking open at maturity to release the seeds through pores (poricidal), through the partitions between the cells (septicidal), or by means of valves (valvular). The numerous seeds are small. Their nutritive tissue (endosperm) is oily and farinose. The fruit of Platystemon is a schizocarp.

The basic chromosome number, x, is 6, 7, 8, 9, 10 and 11, up to 12n = 84 (dodecaploidy) in species of Papaver, Argemone and Meconopsis.

The Papaveraceae family includes many plants that produce alkaloids, including opium poppy (Papaver somniferum). Opium is derived from the latex of the opium poppy seed pods and has been used for centuries due to its psychoactive properties. The main alkaloids found in opium, such as morphine, and codeine have huge impact on pharmaceuticals and a big importance on many countries that produce it on a large-scale including Afghanistan. Afghanistan has an economic dependence on opium cultivation making it hard to stop large scale production of these flowers ultimately increasing illegal production. Researchers are understanding how alkaloids are made in poppy plants to develop poppy plants with specific alkaloid levels. There is high genetic variability among poppy cultivars and environmental factors like wounding and methyl jasmonate treatment induce higher alkaloid production. Challenges still remain in understanding what affects alkaloid production for pharmaceutical purposes, highlighting importance of research in this field.

== Taxonomy ==
The APG III system (2009; unchanged from the APG II system of 2003 and the APG system of 1998) places the family in the order Ranunculales, in the clade eudicots. The Papaveraceae differ from the rest of the Ranunculales in some important characteristics but they share others such as the presence of isoquinoline-derived alkaloids. Based on molecular and morphological data, the family forms a clade with the families Lardizabalaceae, Circaeasteraceae, Menispermaceae, Berberidaceae and Ranunculaceae.

=== Genera ===
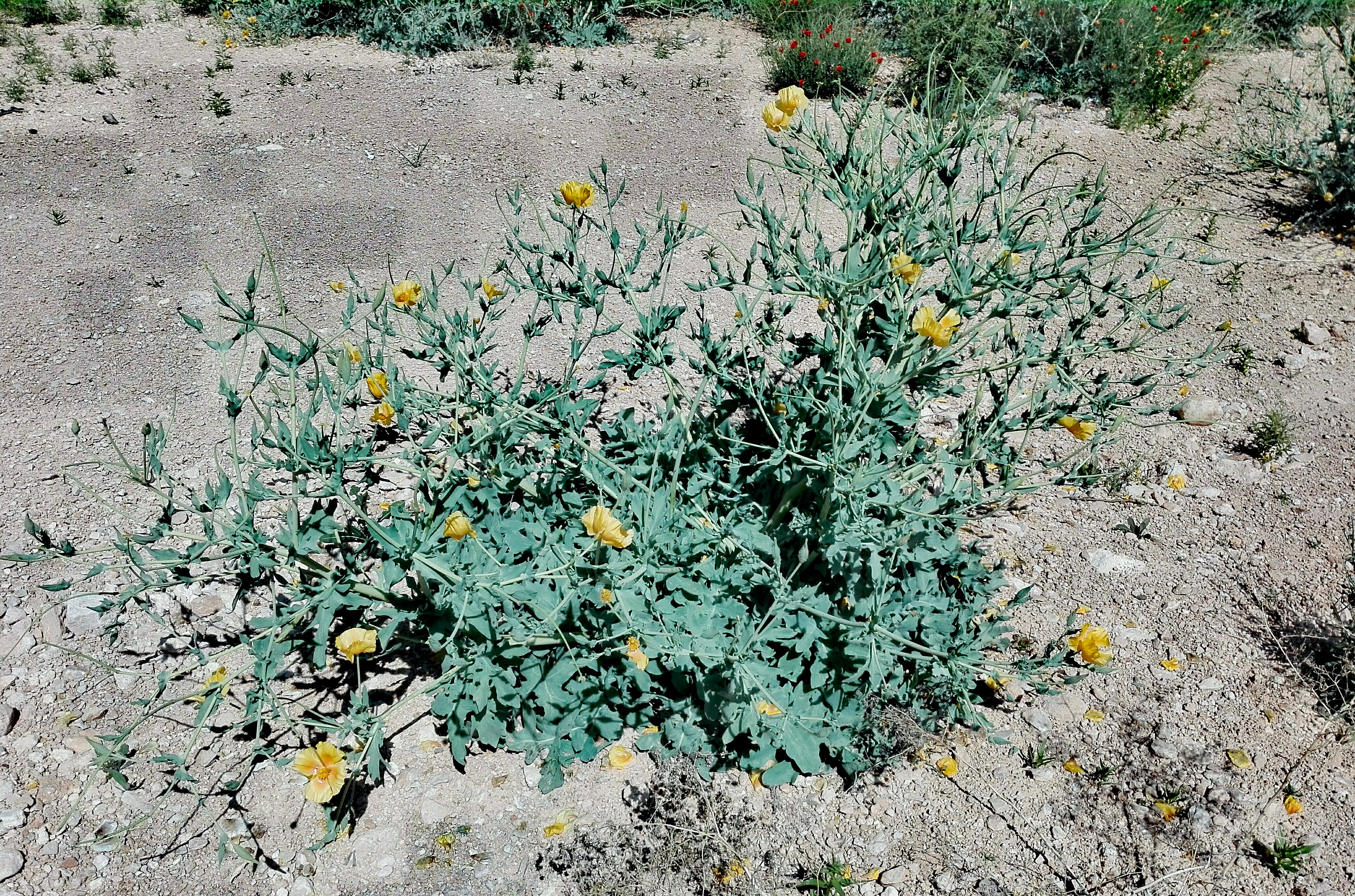
Horned poppy (Glaucium sp.)

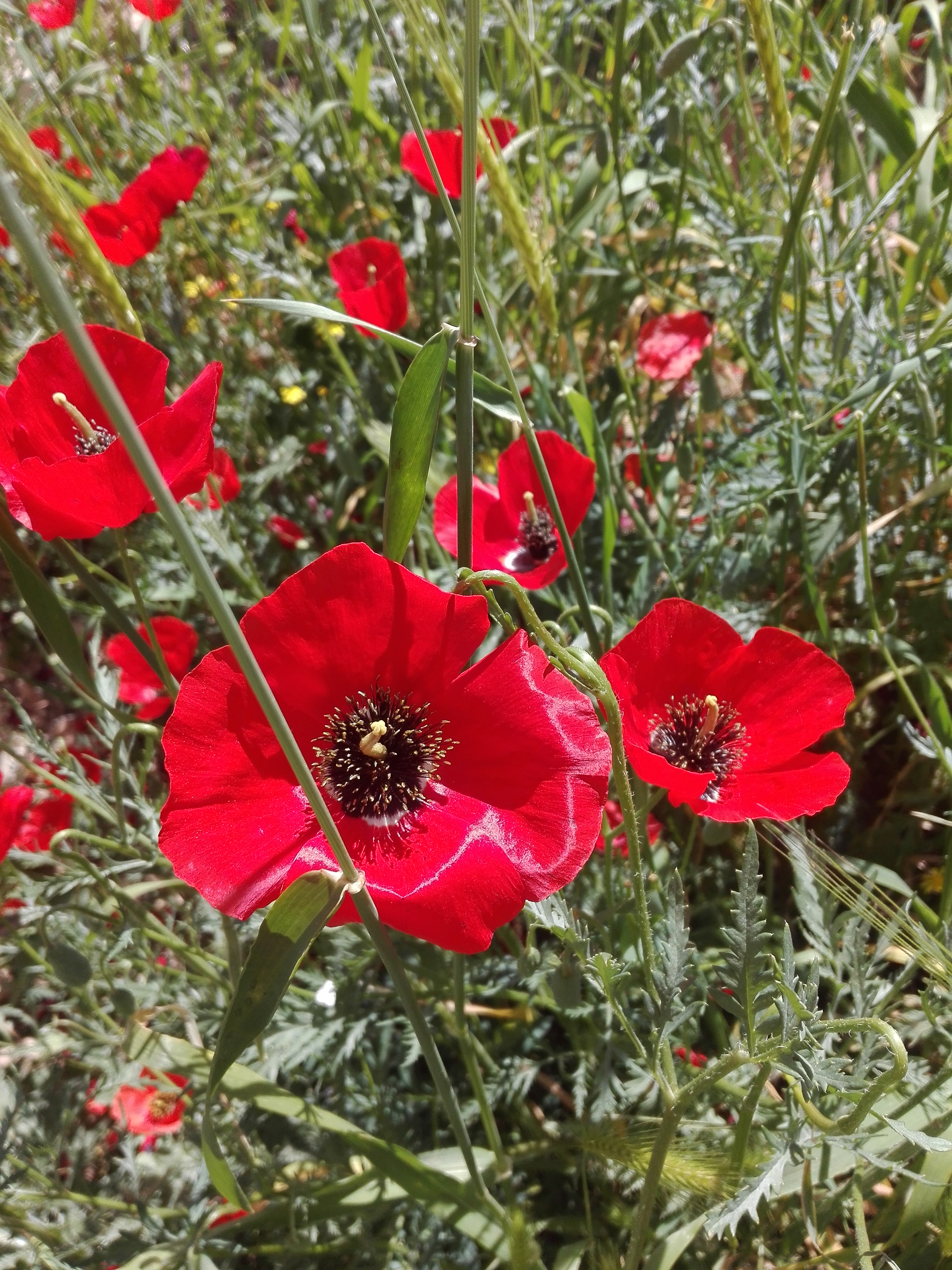
Roemeria sp.

The broad circumscription of Papaveraceae in the APG III system includes three taxa that have previously been separated into different families: the Papaveraceae sensu stricto, the Fumariaceae and the Pteridophyllaceae. Thus the Cronquist system of 1981 recognised the Fumariaceae as a separate family, despite their close phylogenetic relationship to the Papaveraceae sensu stricto. The three former families may be treated as subfamilies. One morphological and molecular study concluded that the former family Pteridophyllaceae has a basal position with a subsequent division into two terminal clades each containing one of the subfamilies Fumarioideae and Papaveroideae, which are clearly monophyletic. A more recent study includes the former Pteridophyllaceae in the Fumarioideae, dividing the Papaveraceae into only two subfamilies.

The internal division of the Fumarioideae shown below follows Lidén (1993), with the exception of the placement of Pteridophyllum. The subtribes are given by the Germplasm Resources Information Network. The division of the Papaveroideae follows Hoot et al. (1997). In the latter study, the tribe Eschscholzieae would be the basal clade and sister group to the rest of the subfamily, which is divided into a different terminal clade (Chelidonieae) and into its sister group, formed by the Papavereae and Platystemoneae, whose separation is not based on the data presented by these authors. For discussions of subfamilies, see Carolan et al. (2006) and Blattner & Kadereit (1999).

==== Fumarioideae ====
- Subfamily Fumarioideae Eaton

- Tribe Hypecoeae Dumort.

- Hypecoum L. – Mediterranean region to Mongolia and Western China.
- Pteridophyllum Siebold & Zucc. – Japan

- Tribe Fumarieae Dumort.

- Subtribe Corydalinae

- Adlumia Raf. ex DC. – Eastern North America, Korea, China
- Capnoides Mill. – Northern North America
- Corydalis DC. nom. cons. – Eurasia, North America, East Africa
- Dactylicapnos Wall. – Himalayas
- Dicentra Bernh. nom. cons. – Eastern Asia, North America
- Ehrendorferia Fukuhara & Lidén – Western United States
- Ichtyoselmis Lidén & Fukuhara – China
- Lamprocapnos Endl. – China, Korea

- Subtribe Fumariinae

- Ceratocapnos Durieu – South west of Europe, north west of Africa
- Cryptocapnos Rech.f. – Central Afghanistan
- Cysticapnos Mill. – South Africa
- Discocapnos Cham. & Schltdl. – South Africa
- Fumaria L. – Mediterranean region, Himalayas, East Africa
- Fumariola Korsh. – Central Asia
- Platycapnos (DC.) Bernh. – Western Mediterranean region
- Pseudofumaria Medik. – Italy, Balkans
- Rupicapnos Pomel – North west Africa
- Sarcocapnos DC. – Spain, Morocco, Algeria
- Trigonocapnos Schltr. – South Africa

Photos of Fumarioideae (the fumewort subfamily)

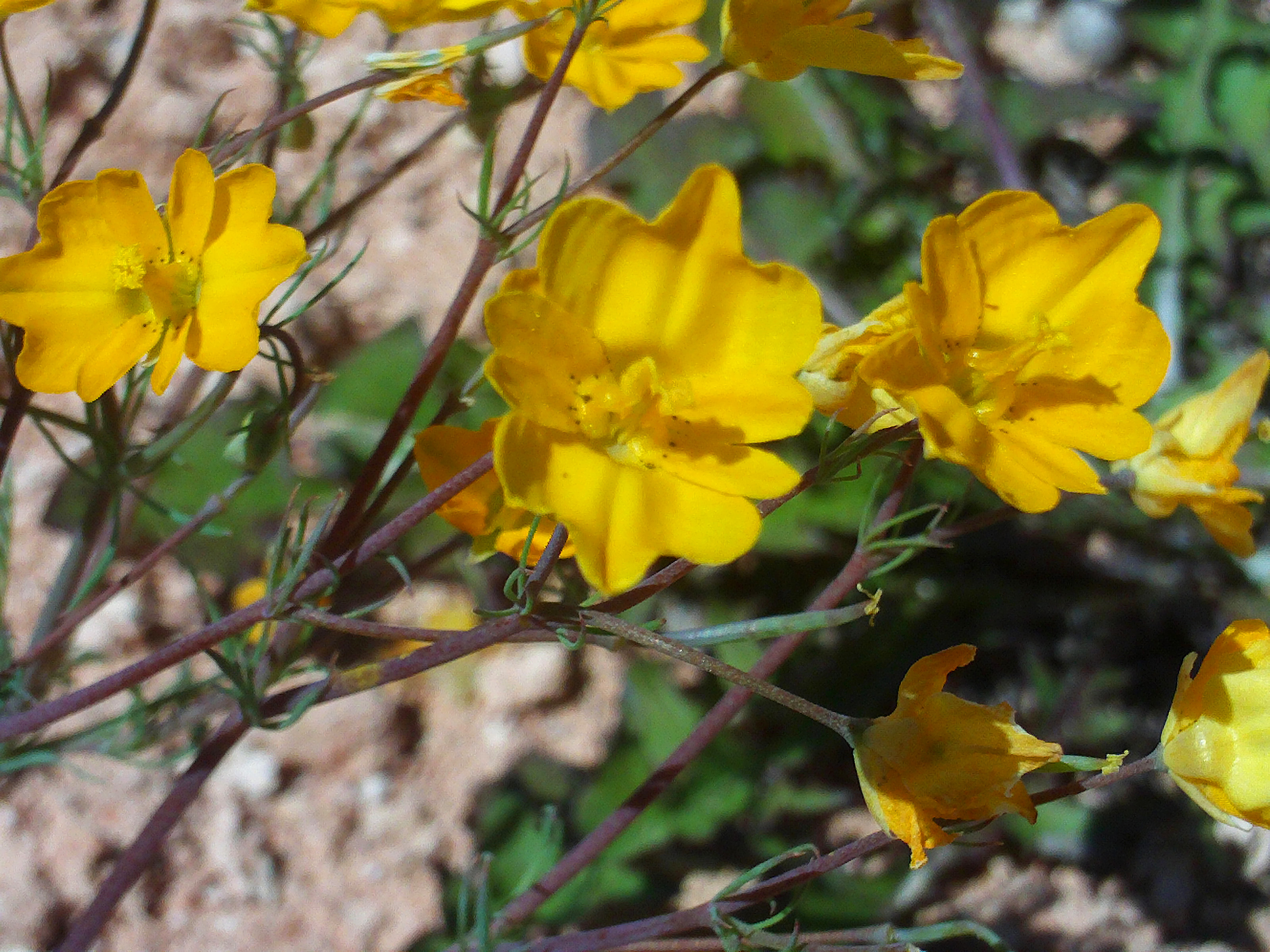
Hypecoum procumbens

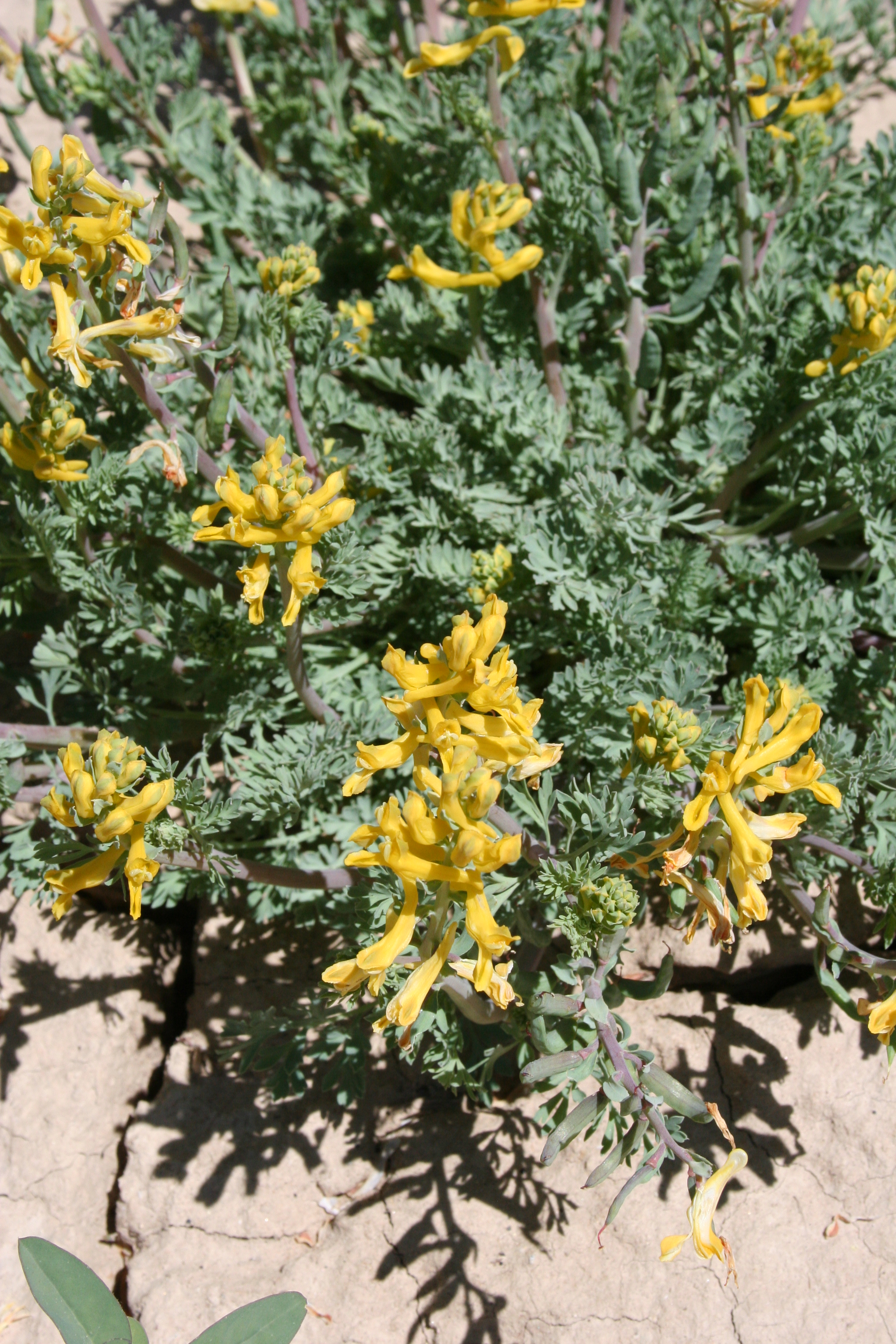
Scrambled eggs (Corydalis aurea)

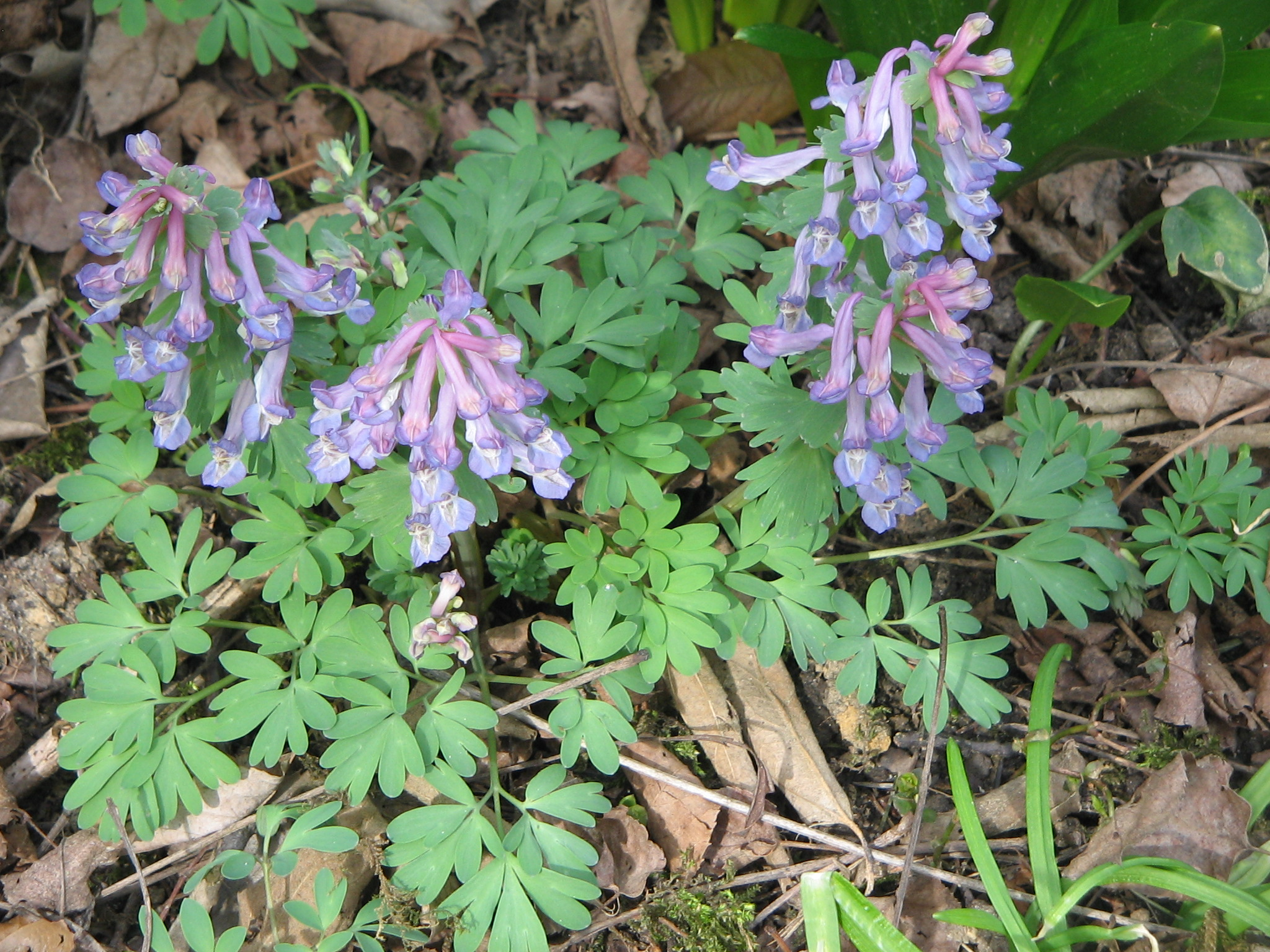
Fumewort (Corydalis solida)

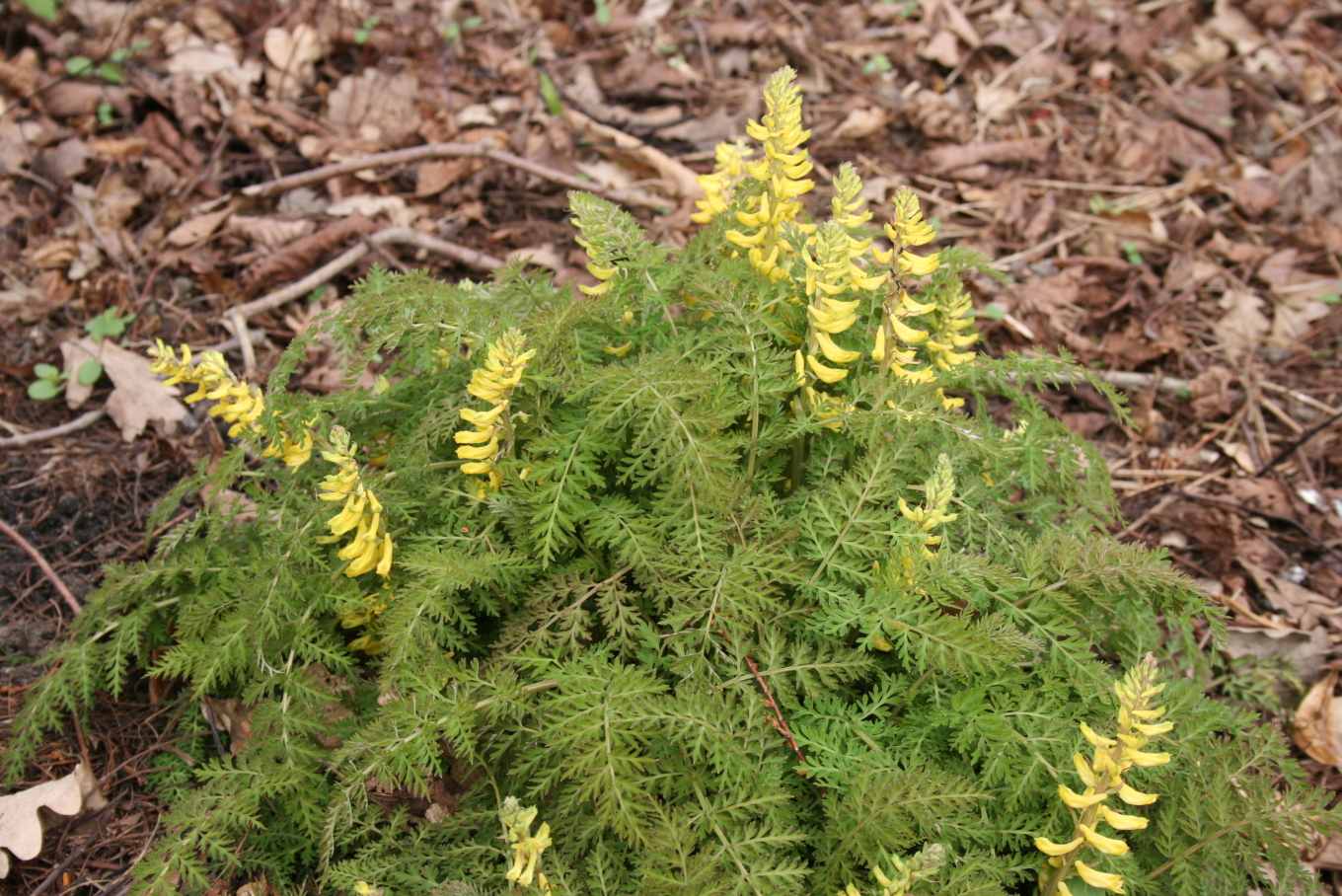
Ferny corydalis (Corydalis cheilanthifolia)

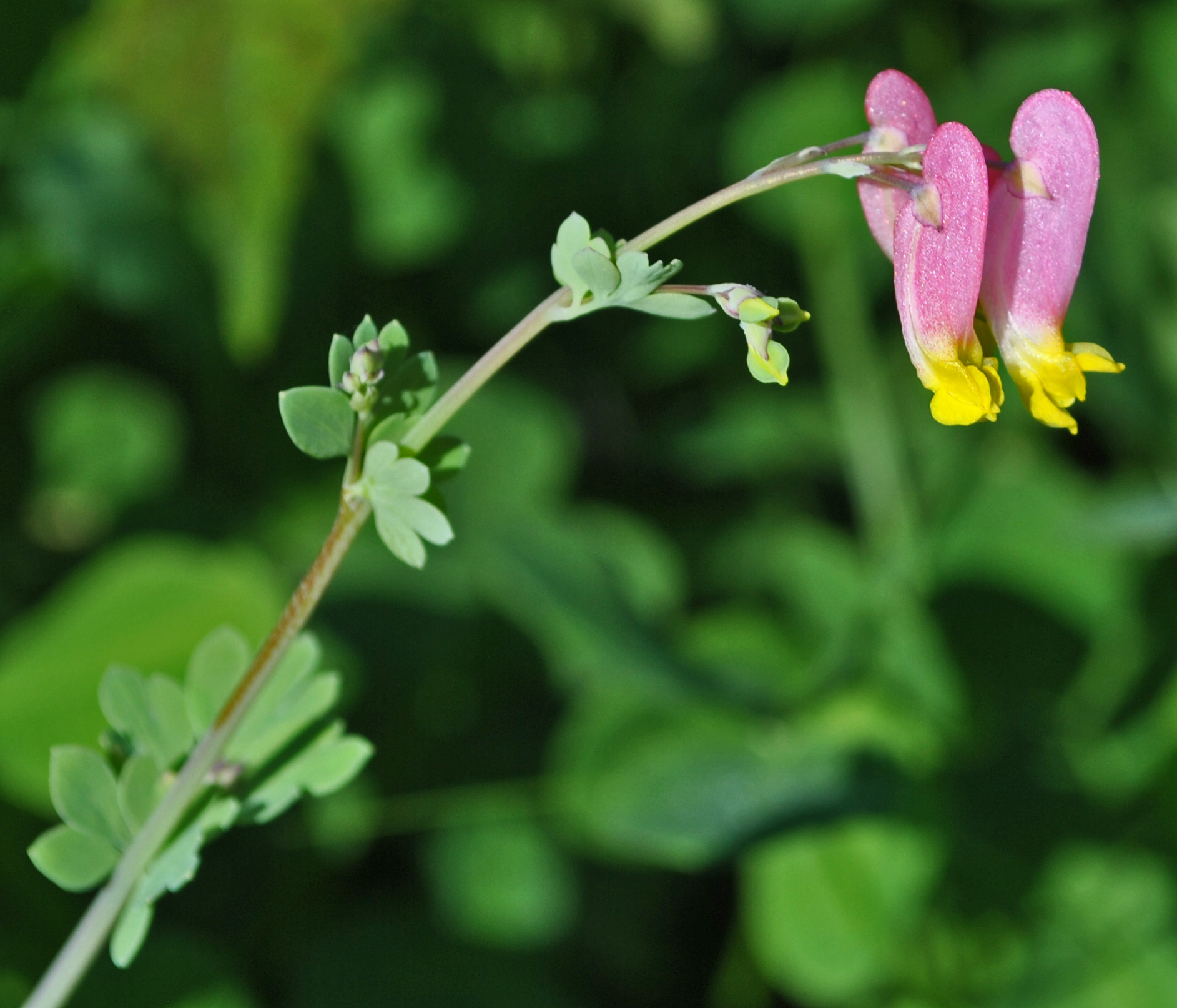
Pale corydalis (Capnoides sempervirens or Corydalis sempervirens)

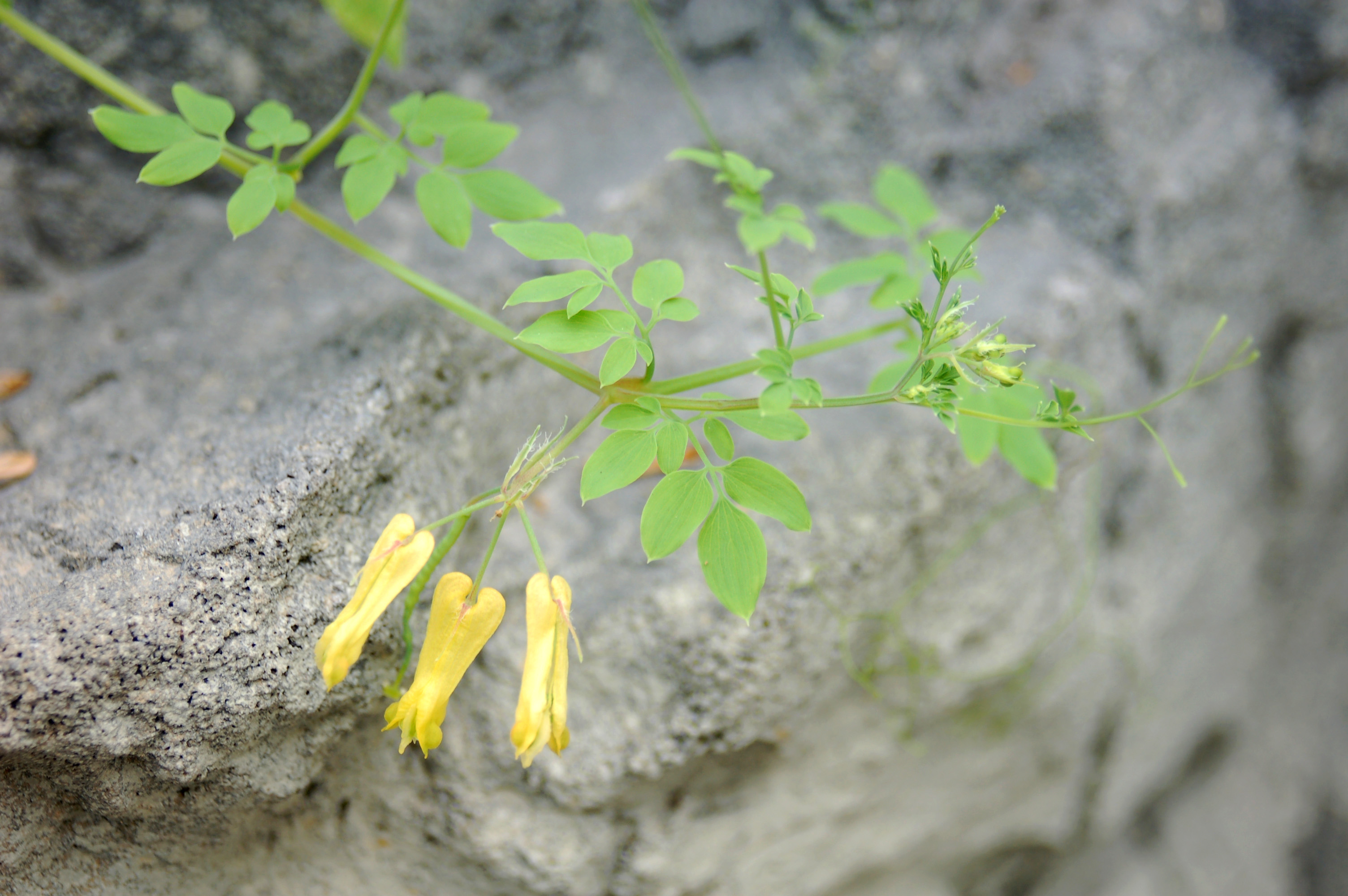
Climbing bleeding-heart (Dactylicapnos scandens or Dicentra scandens)

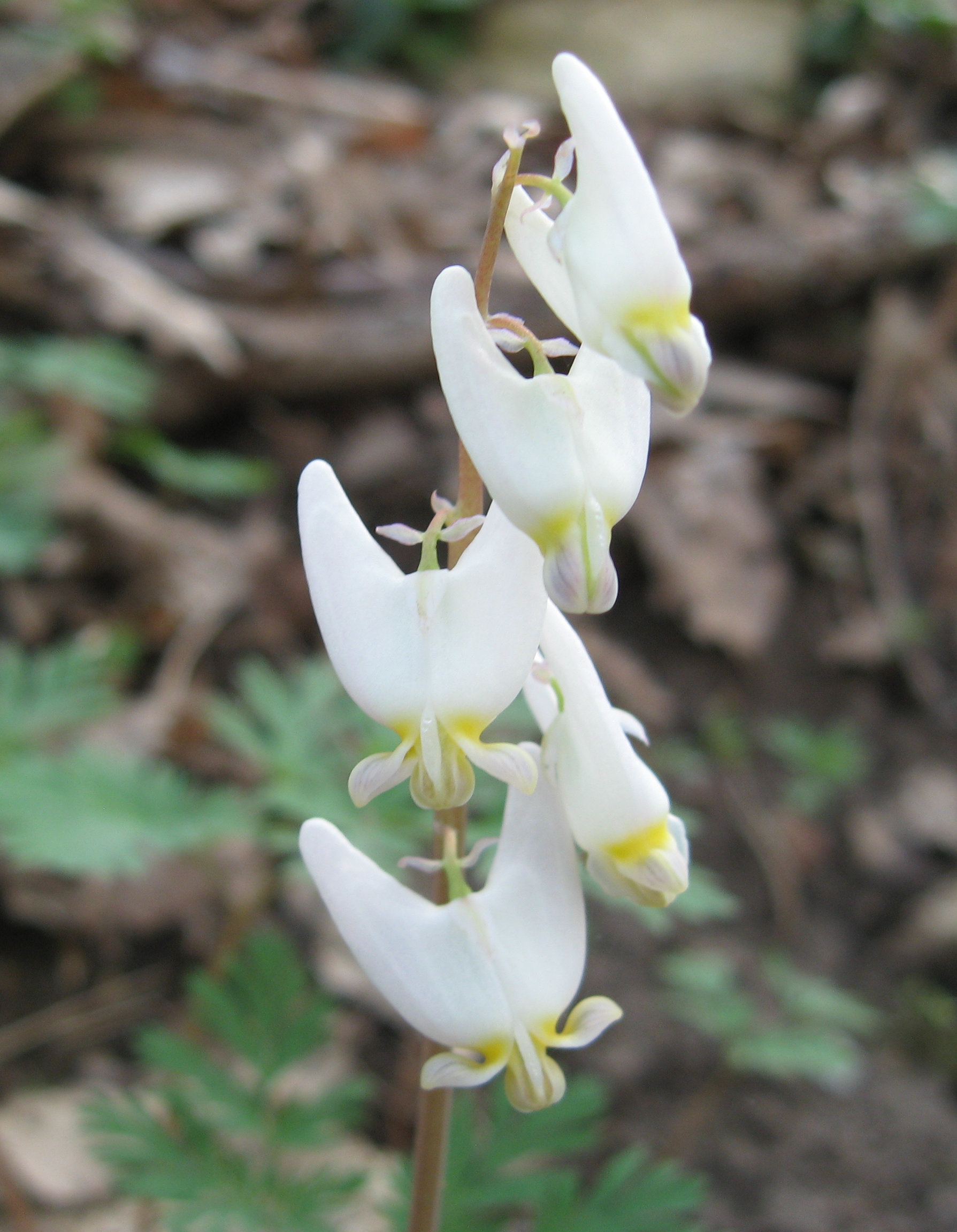
Dutchman's breeches (Dicentra cucullaria)

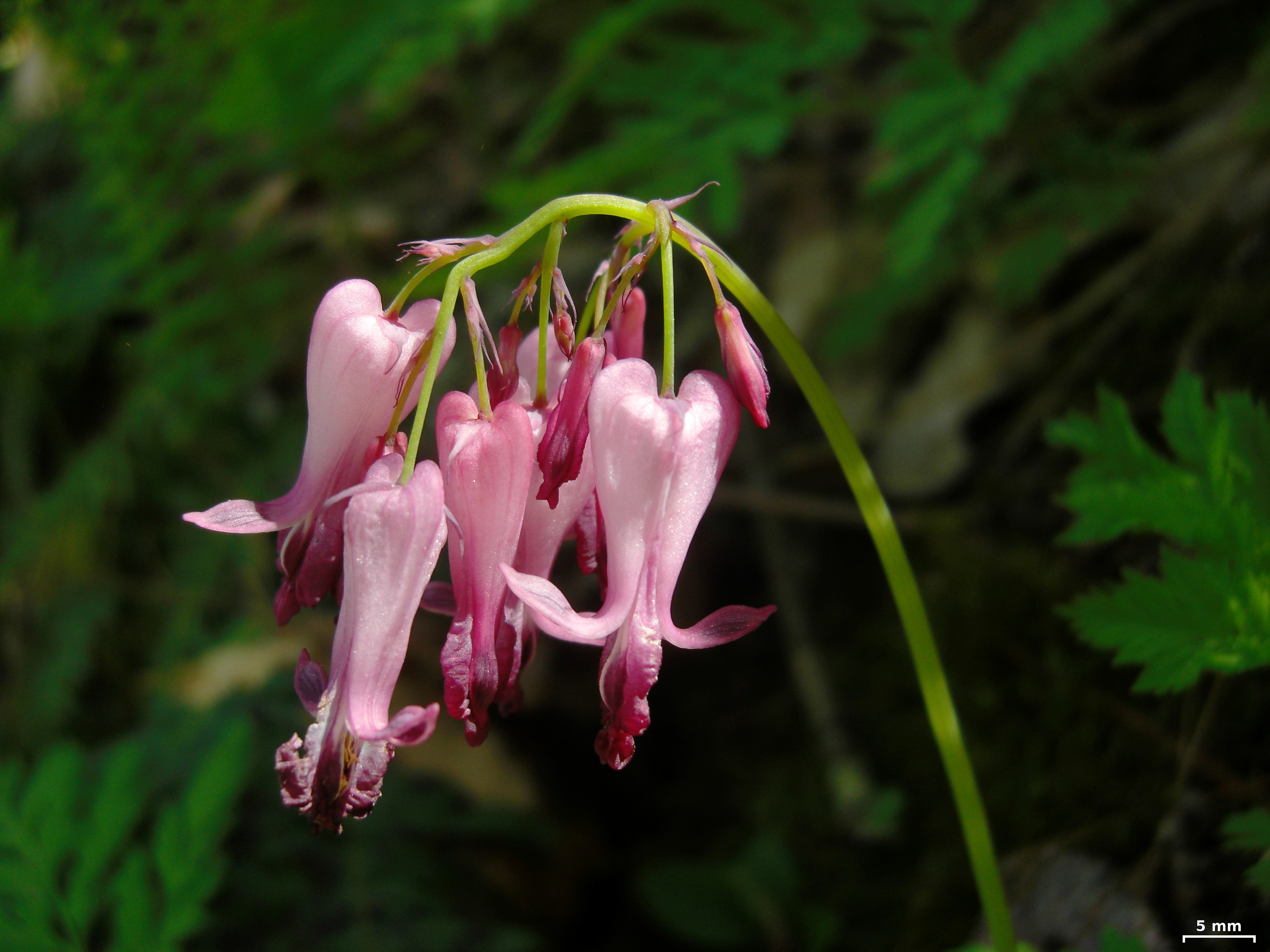
Fringed bleeding-heart (Dicentra eximia)

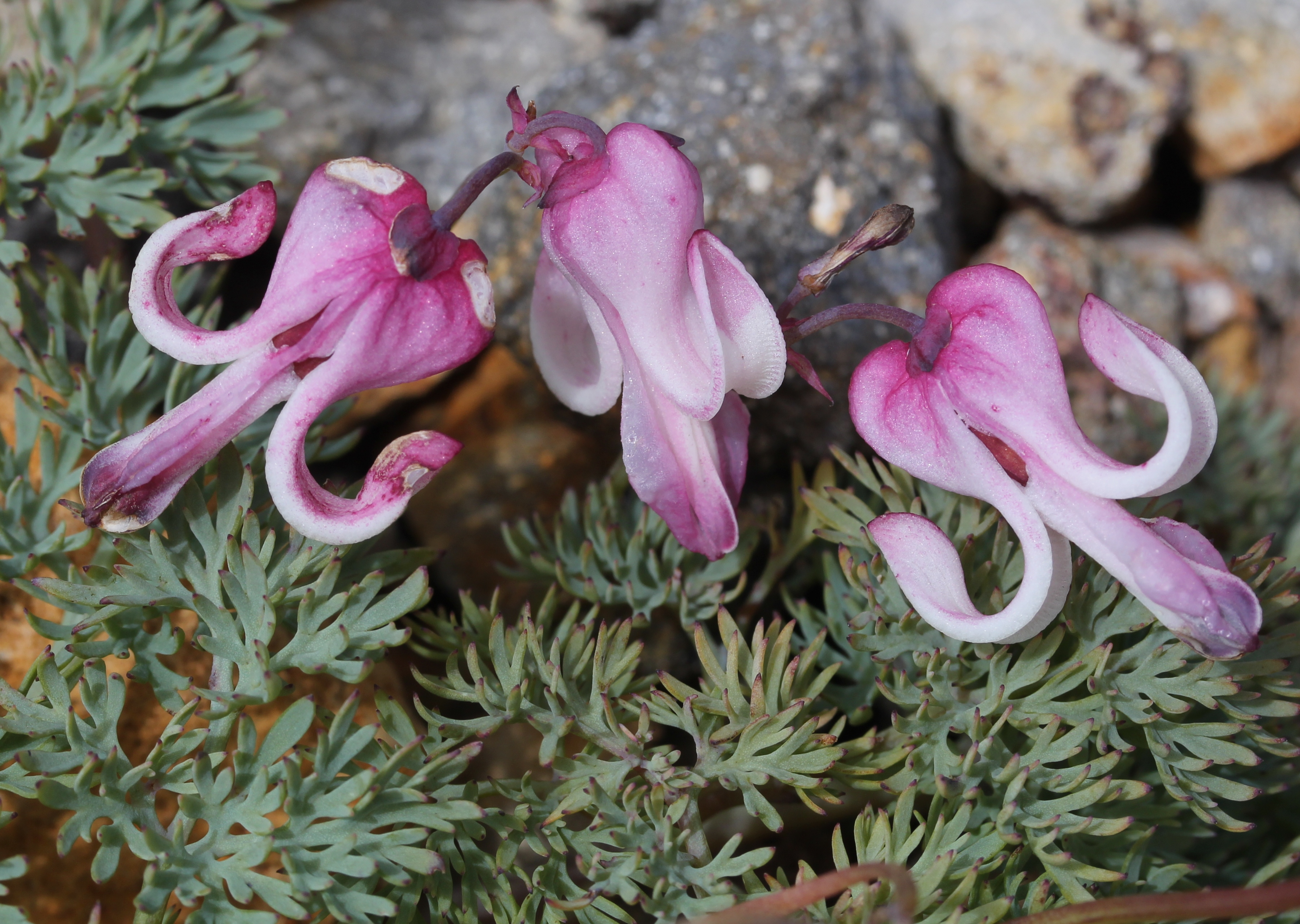
Komakusa (Dicentra peregrina)

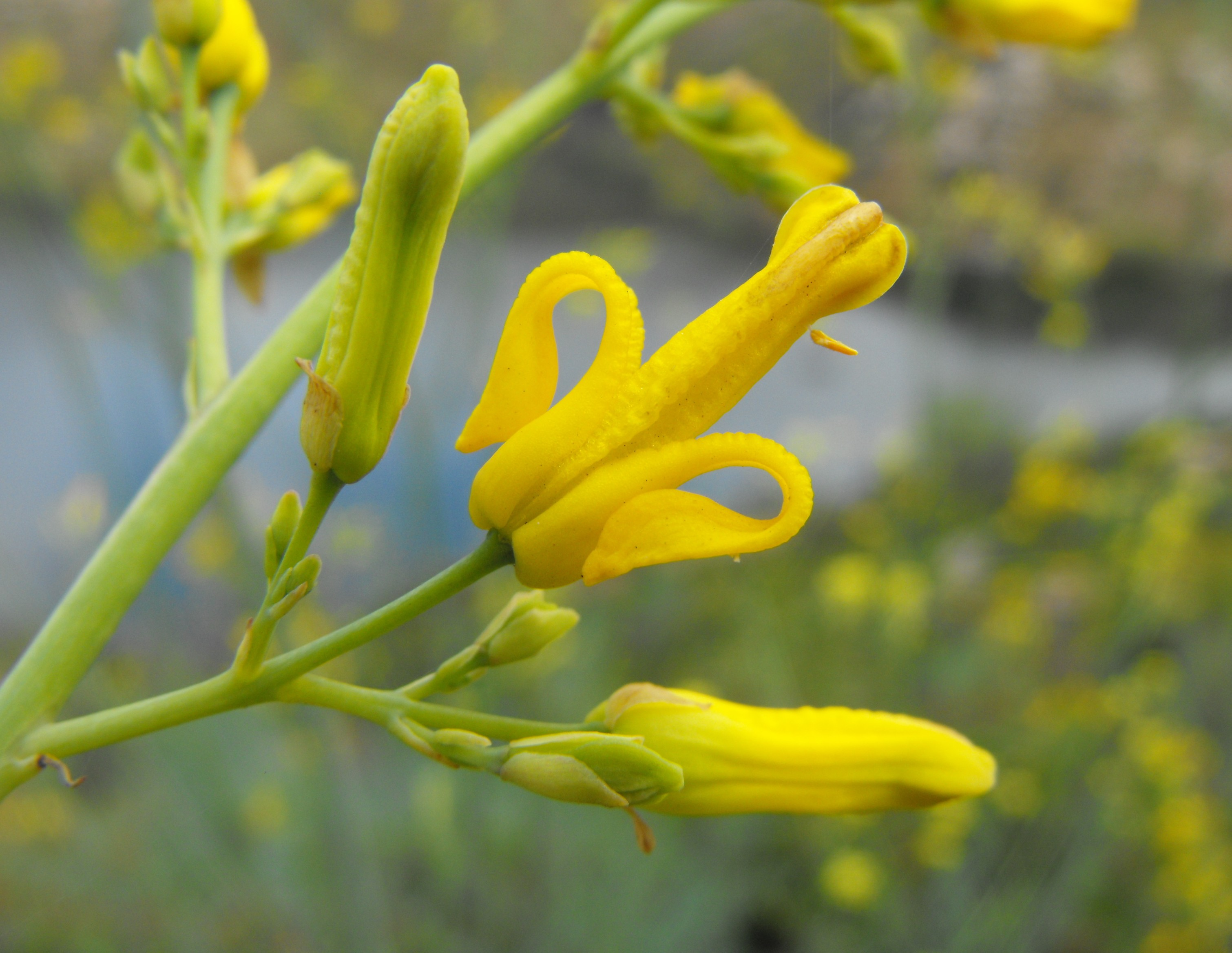
Golden eardrops (Ehrendorferia chrysantha or Dicentra chrysantha)

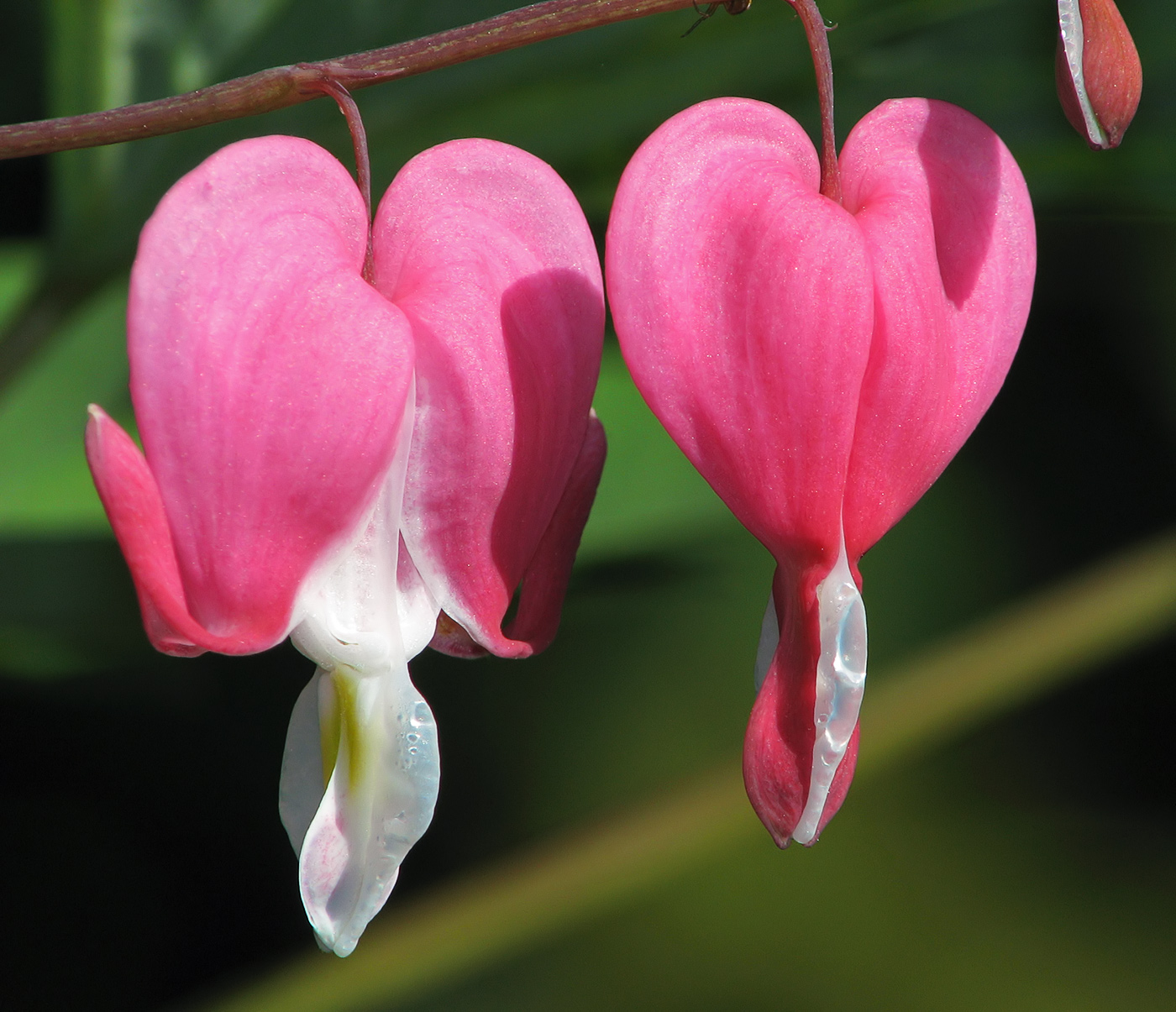
Asian bleeding-heart (Lamprocapnos spectabilis or Dicentra spectabilis)

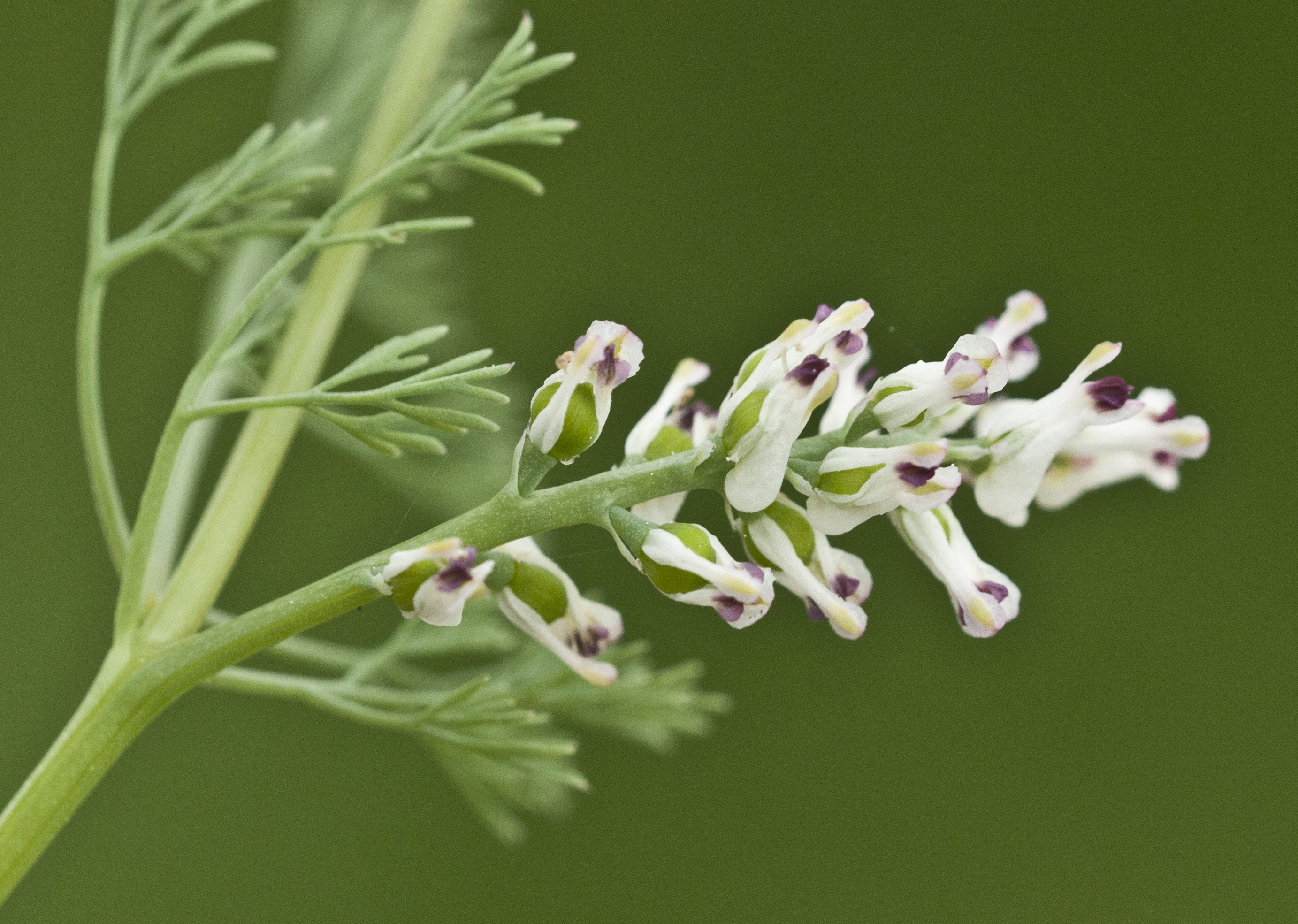
Earth smoke (Fumaria officinalis)

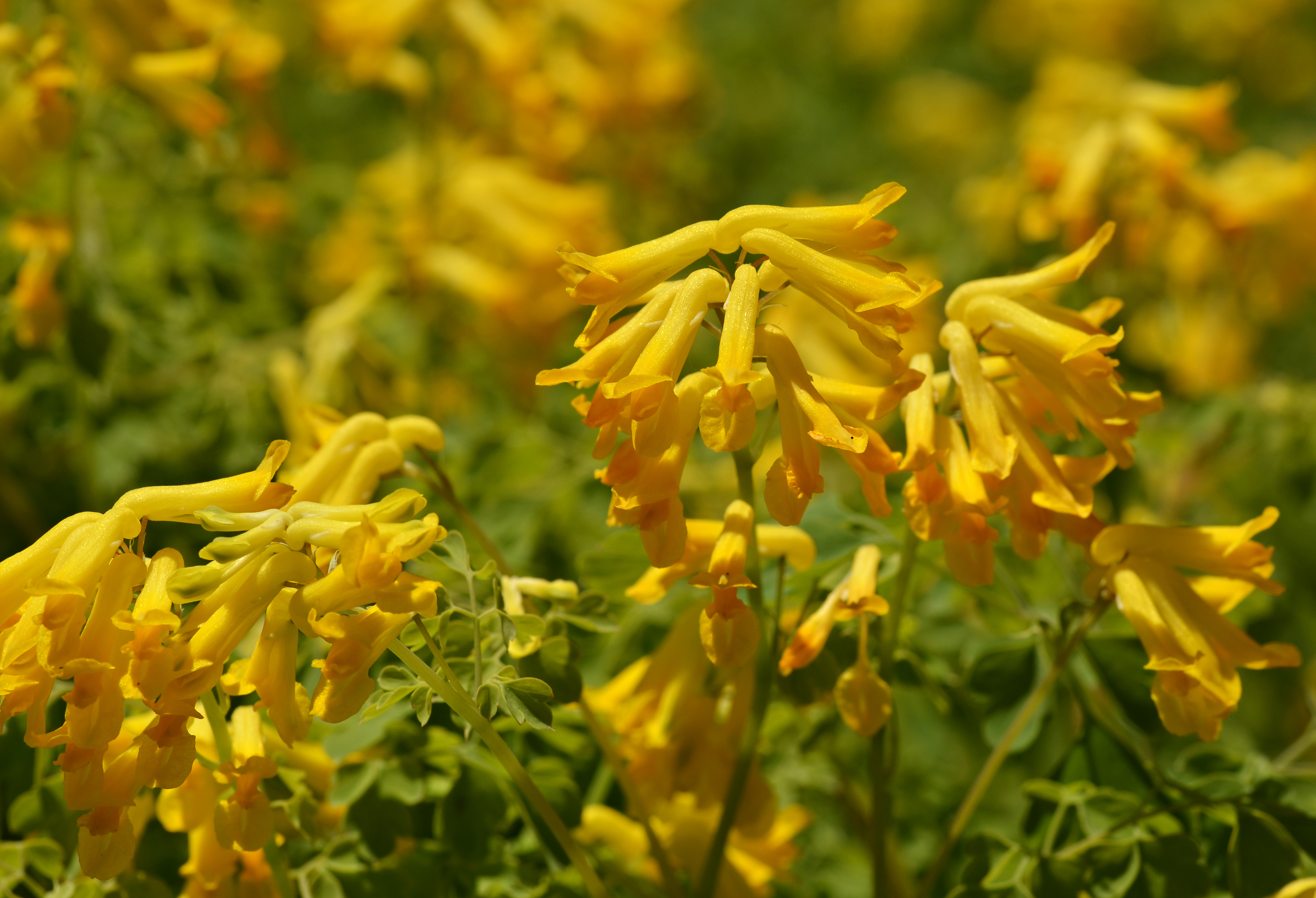
Yellow corydalis (Pseudofumaria lutea or Corydalis lutea)

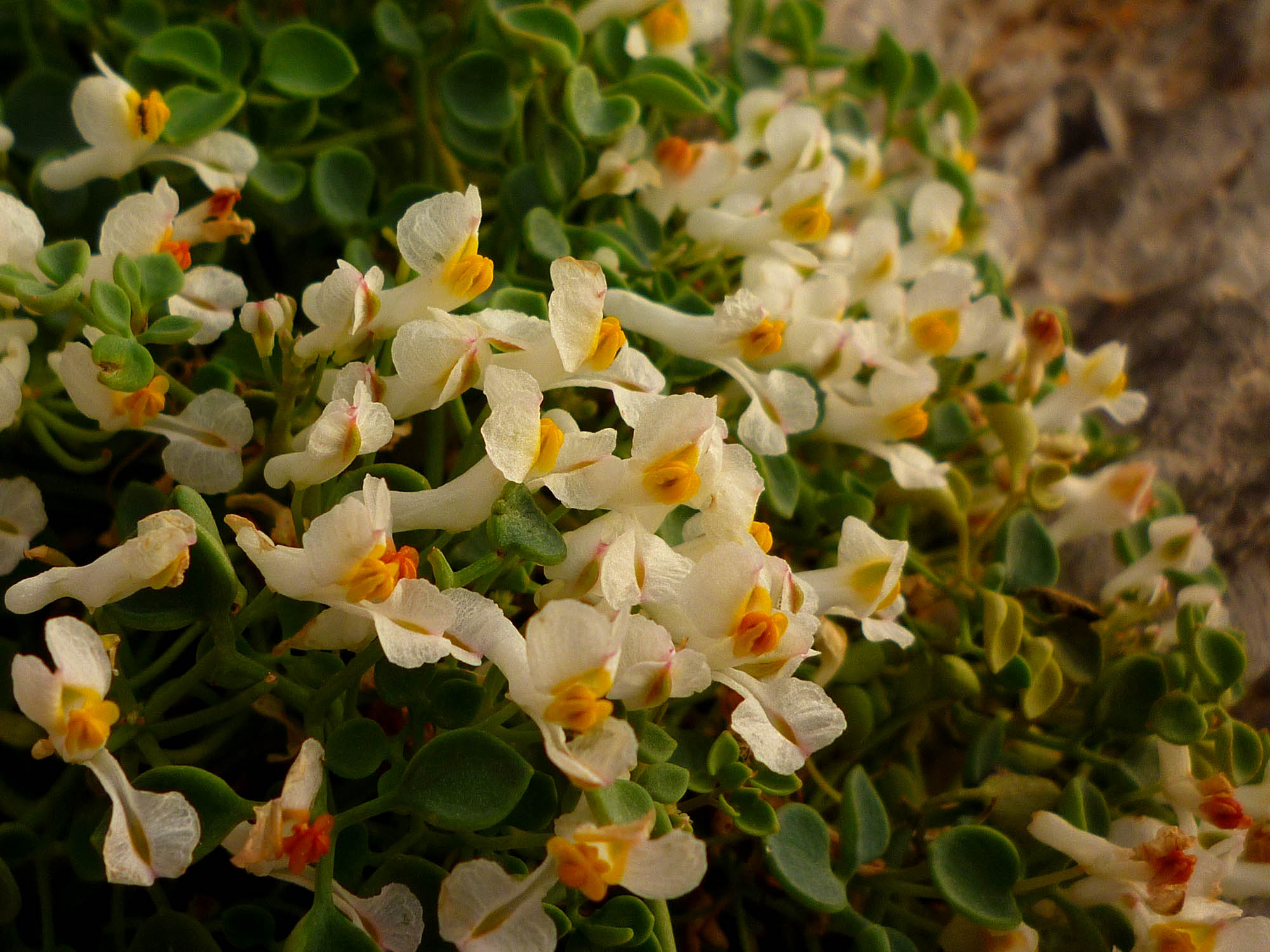
Zapatitos de la Virgen (Sarcocapnos enneaphylla)

==== Papaveroideae ====
- Subfamily Papaveroideae Eaton

- Tribe Eschscholzieae Baill.

- Dendromecon Benth. – California.
- Eschscholzia Cham. – Western North America.
- Hunnemannia Sweet – Eastern Mexico.

- Tribe Chelidonieae Dumort.

- Bocconia L. – Central and southern America, Antilles
- Chelidonium L. – Eurasia
- Coreanomecon Nakai – Korea
- Dicranostigma Hook.f. & Thomson – Central Asia
- Eomecon Hance – Eastern China
- Glaucium Mill. – Europe to Central Asia
- Hylomecon Maxim. – Eastern Asia
- Macleaya R.Br. – Eastern Asia
- Sanguinaria L. – Eastern North America
- Stylophorum Nutt. – Eastern North America, Eastern Asia

- Tribe Platystemoneae Spach

- Hesperomecon Greene – Western North America
- Meconella Nutt. – Western North America
- Platystemon Benth. – Western North America

- Tribe Papavereae Dumort.

- Arctomecon Torr. & Frém. – Western North America
- Argemone L. – North America, Antilles, central and southern America, Hawaii
- Canbya Parry – Western North America
- Cathcartia Hook.f. – China and the Himalayas, split from Meconopsis
- Meconopsis Vig. – Central southern Asia, western Europe; paraphyletic
- Papaver L. – Northern hemisphere, South Africa, Cape Verde; paraphyletic
- Roemeria Medik. – Mediterranean region, south west Asia
- Romneya Harv. – California
- Stylomecon G. Taylor – California

Photos of Papaveroideae (the poppy subfamily)

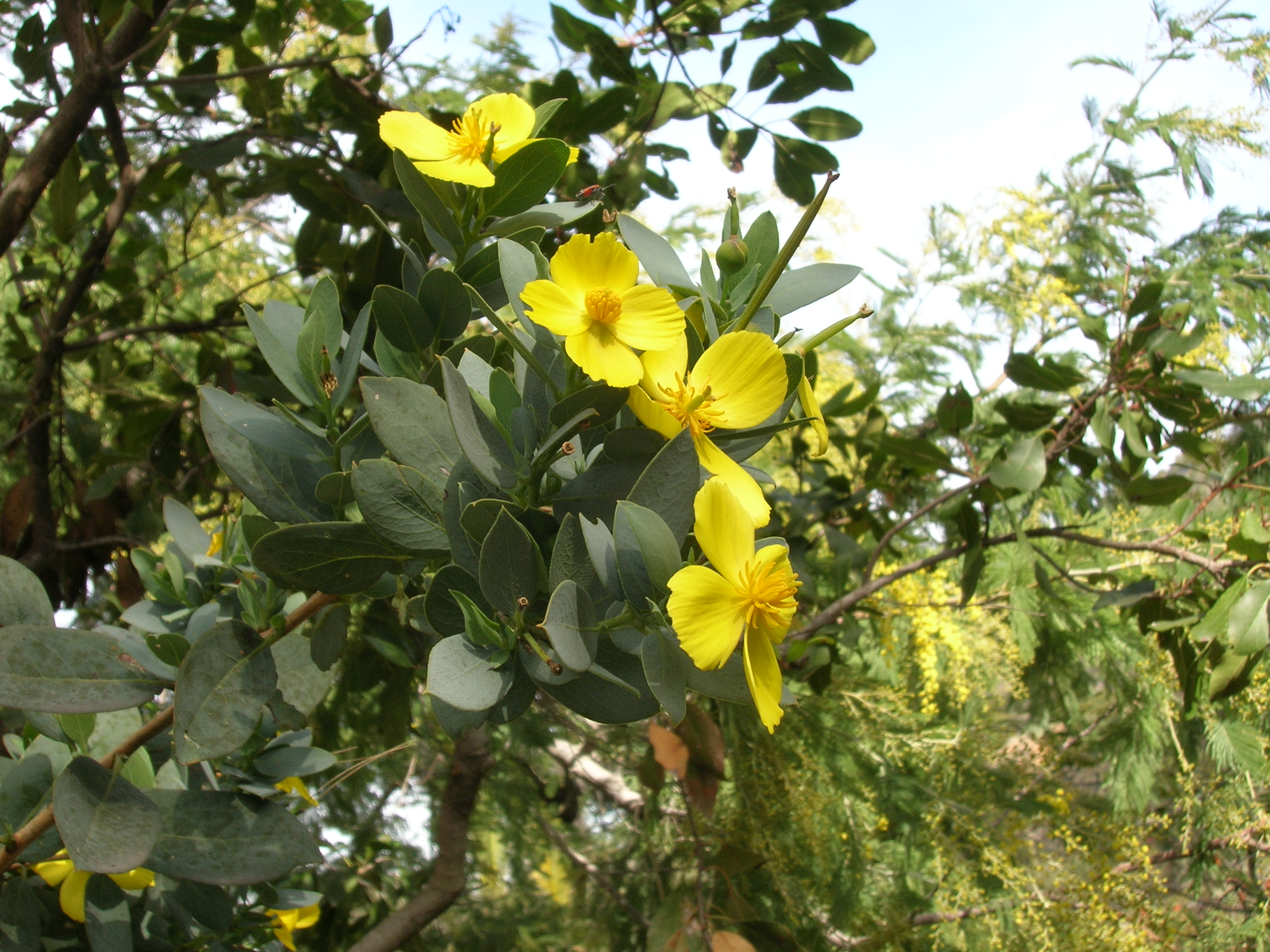
Channel Island tree poppy (Dendromecon harfordii)

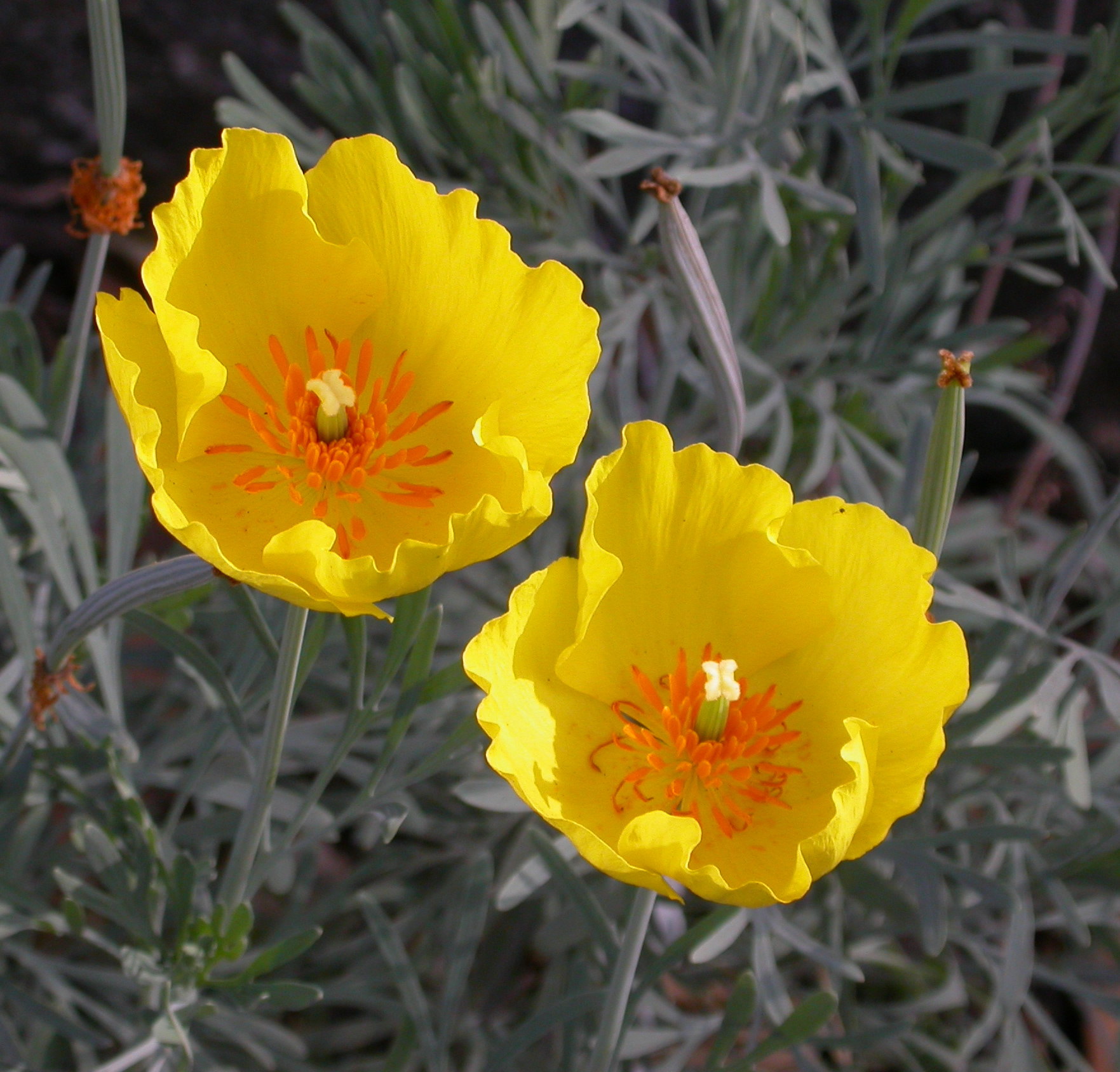
Tulip poppy (Hunnemannia fumariifolia)

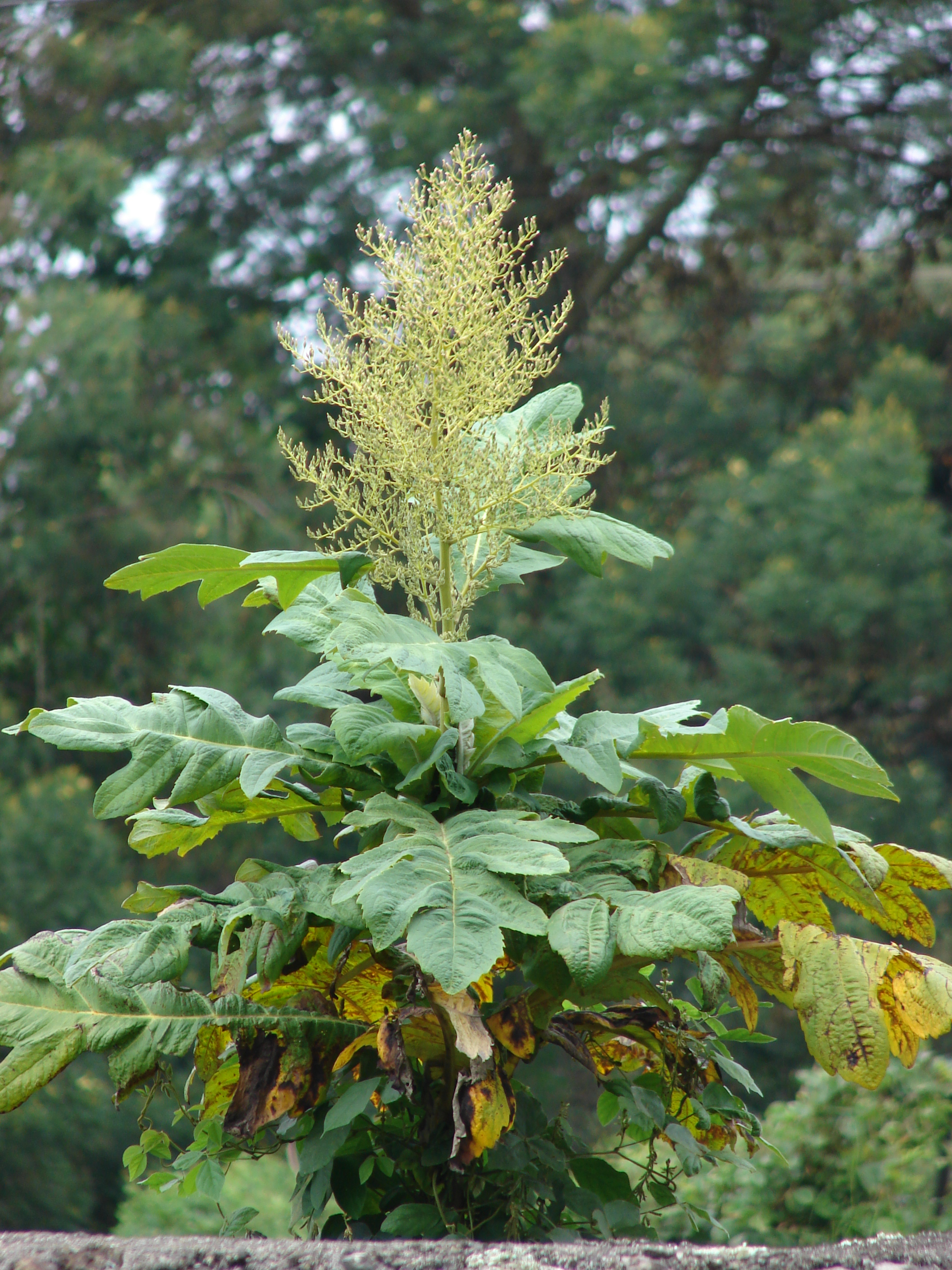
Plume poppy (Bocconia frutescens)

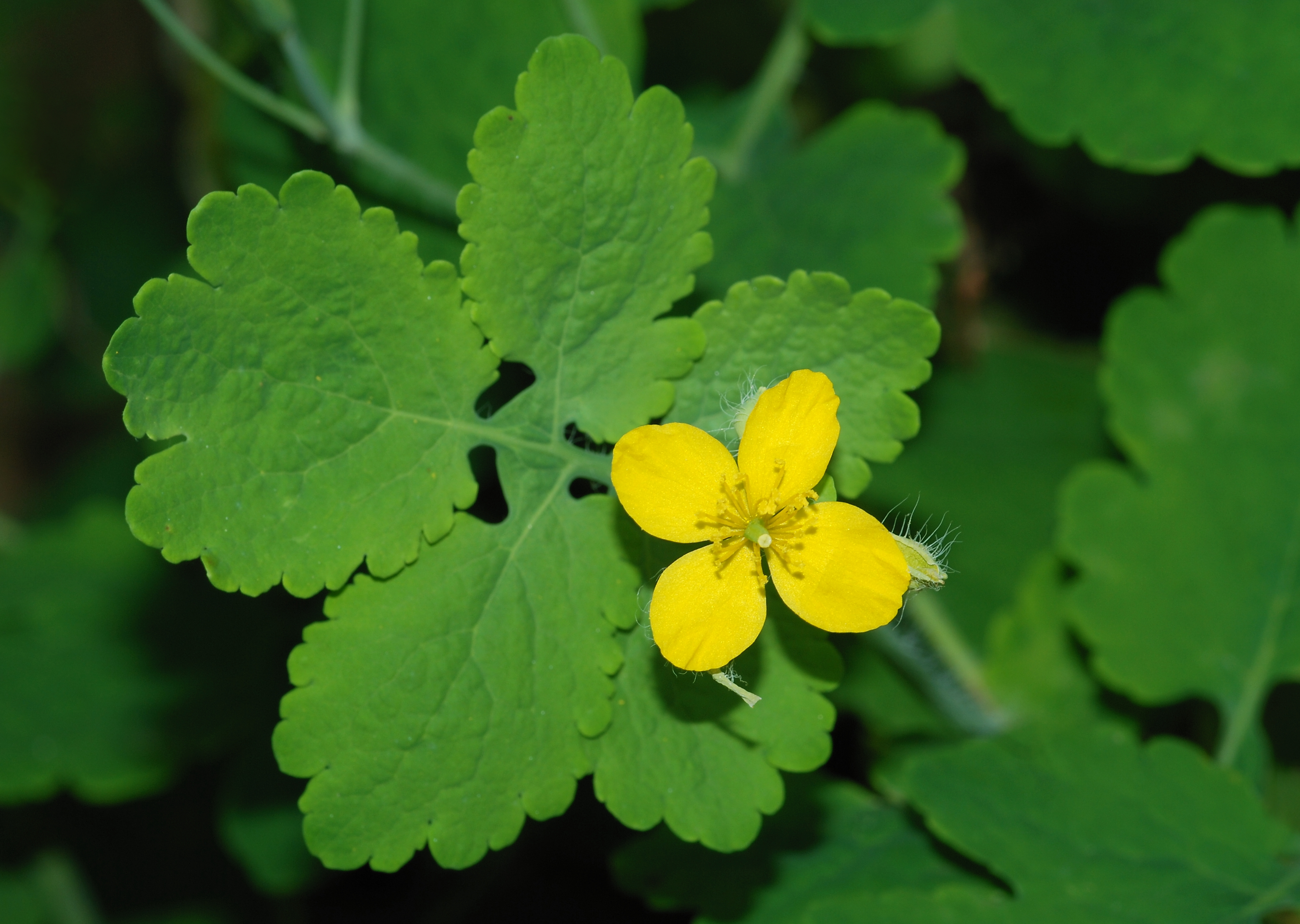
Greater celandine (Chelidonium majus)

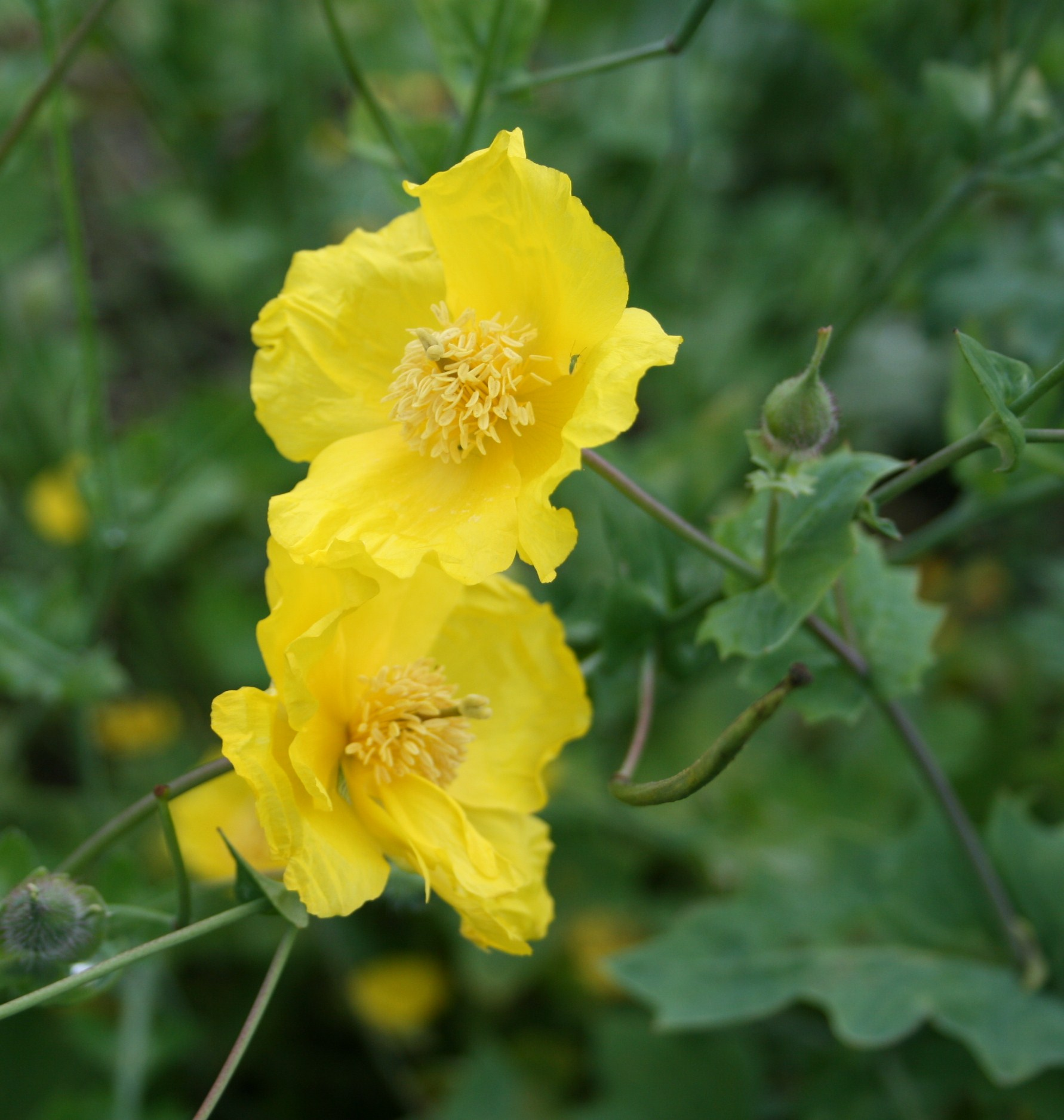
Eastern horned poppy (Dicranostigma erectum)

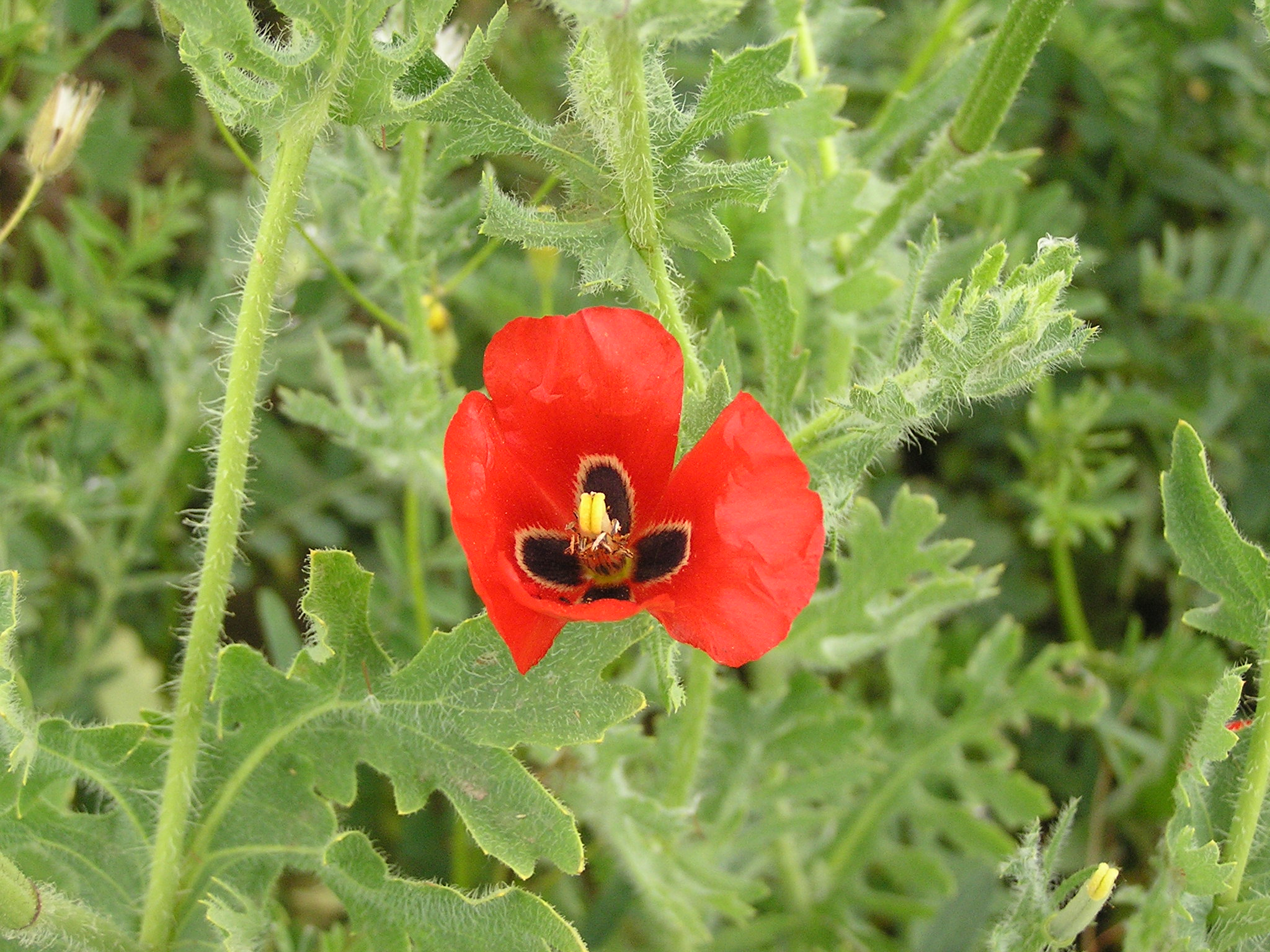
Red horned poppy (Glaucium corniculatum)

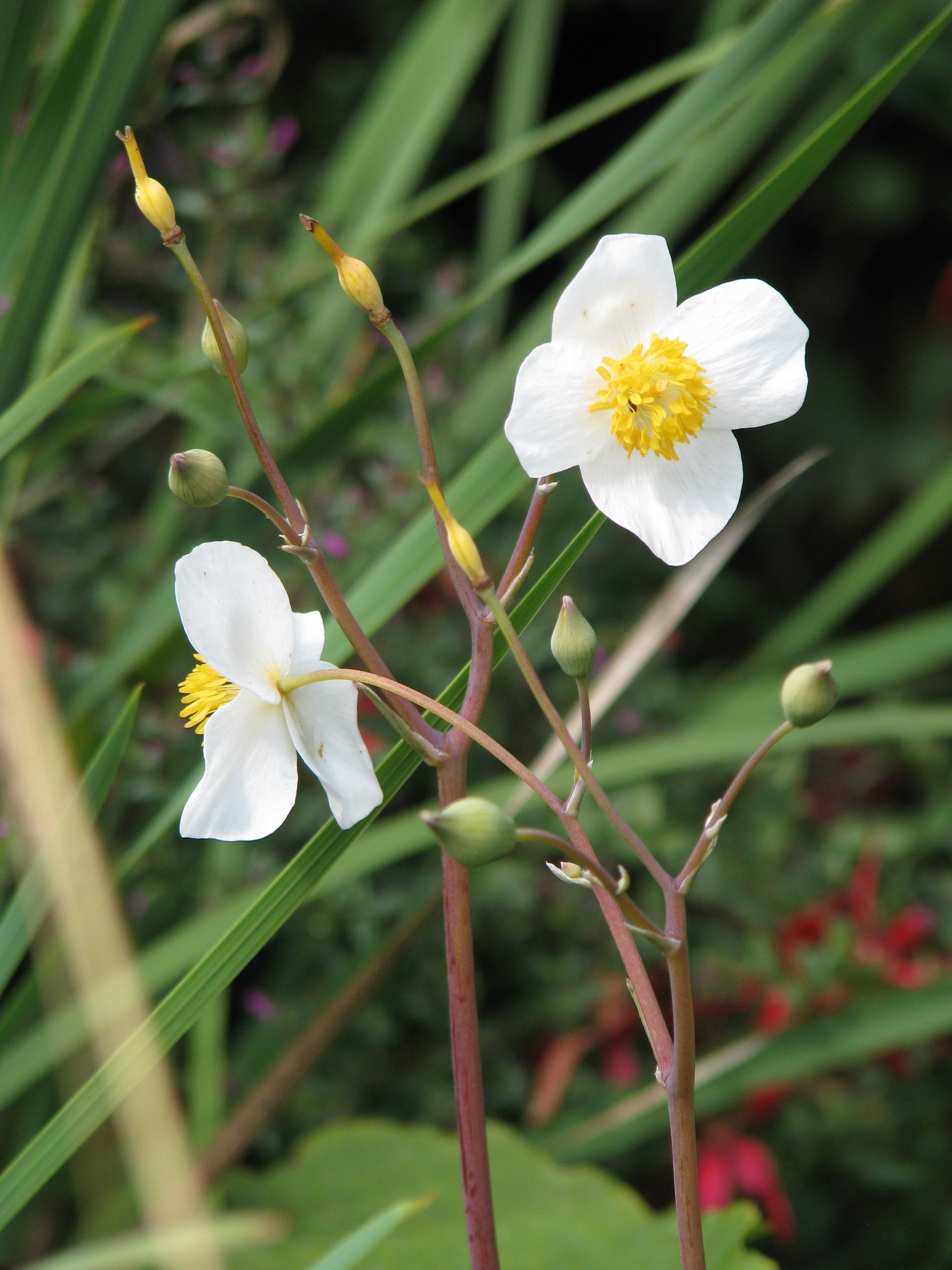
Snow-poppy (Eomecon chionantha)

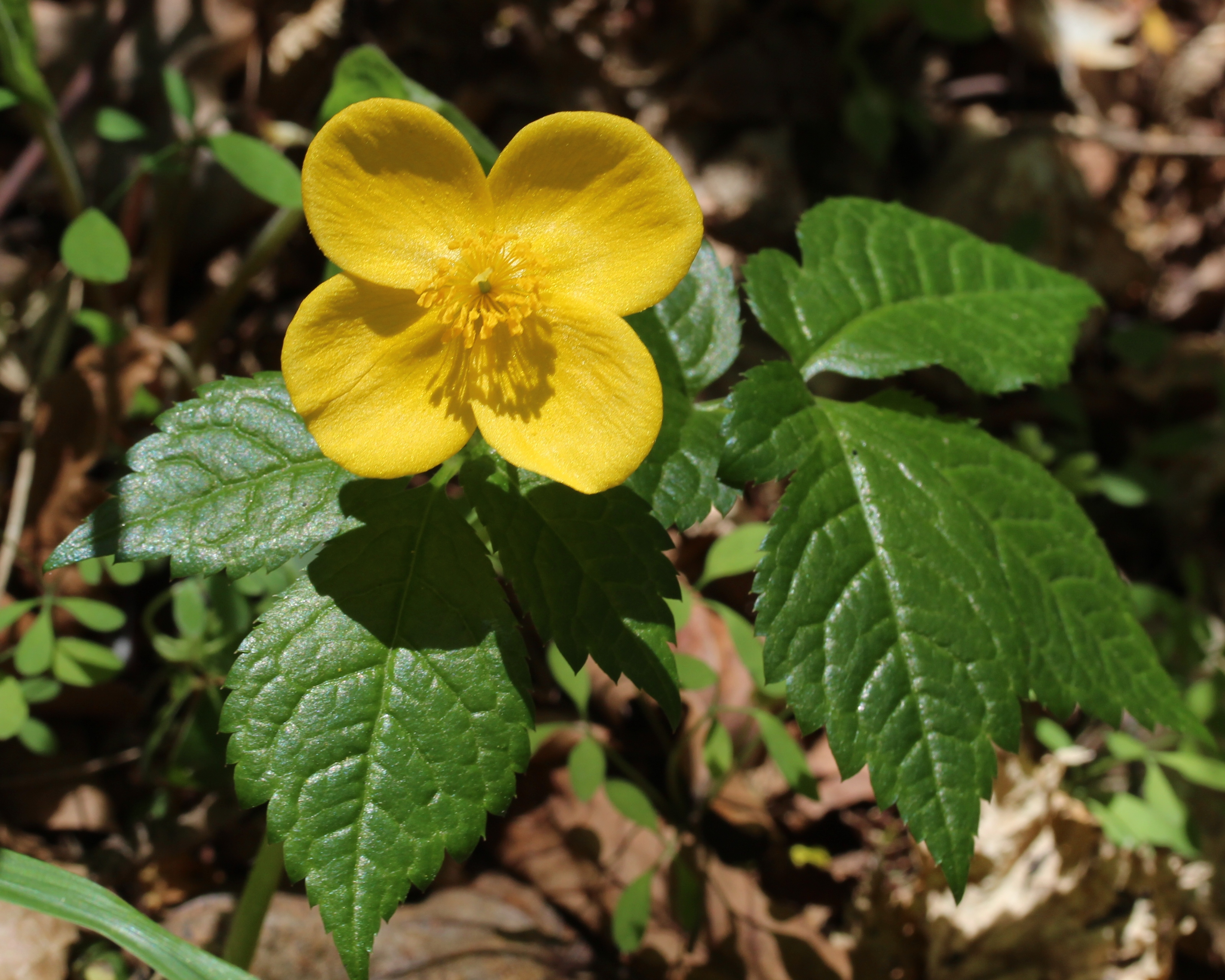
Forest poppy (Hylomecon vernalis)

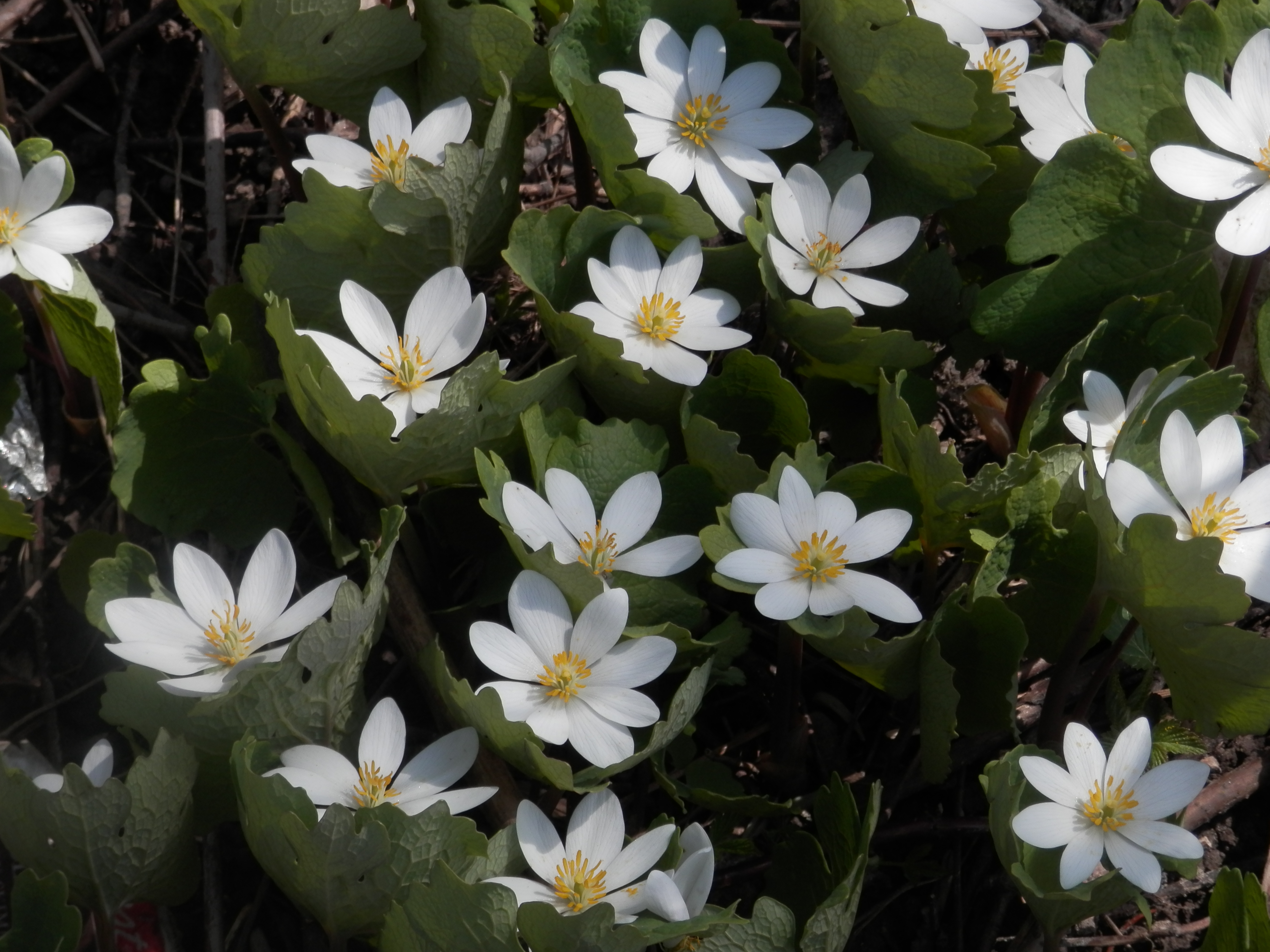
Bloodroot (Sanguinaria canadensis)

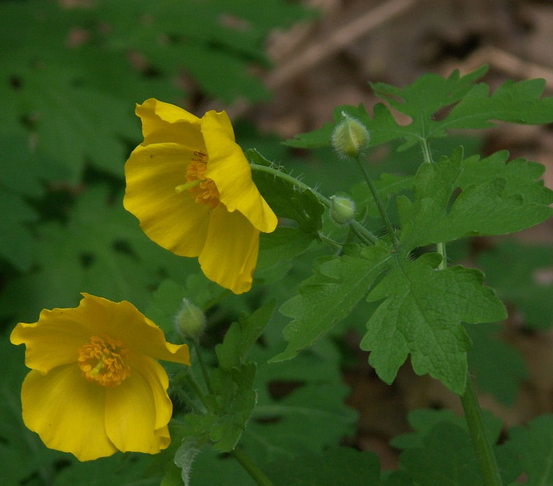
Wood poppy (Stylophorum diphyllum)

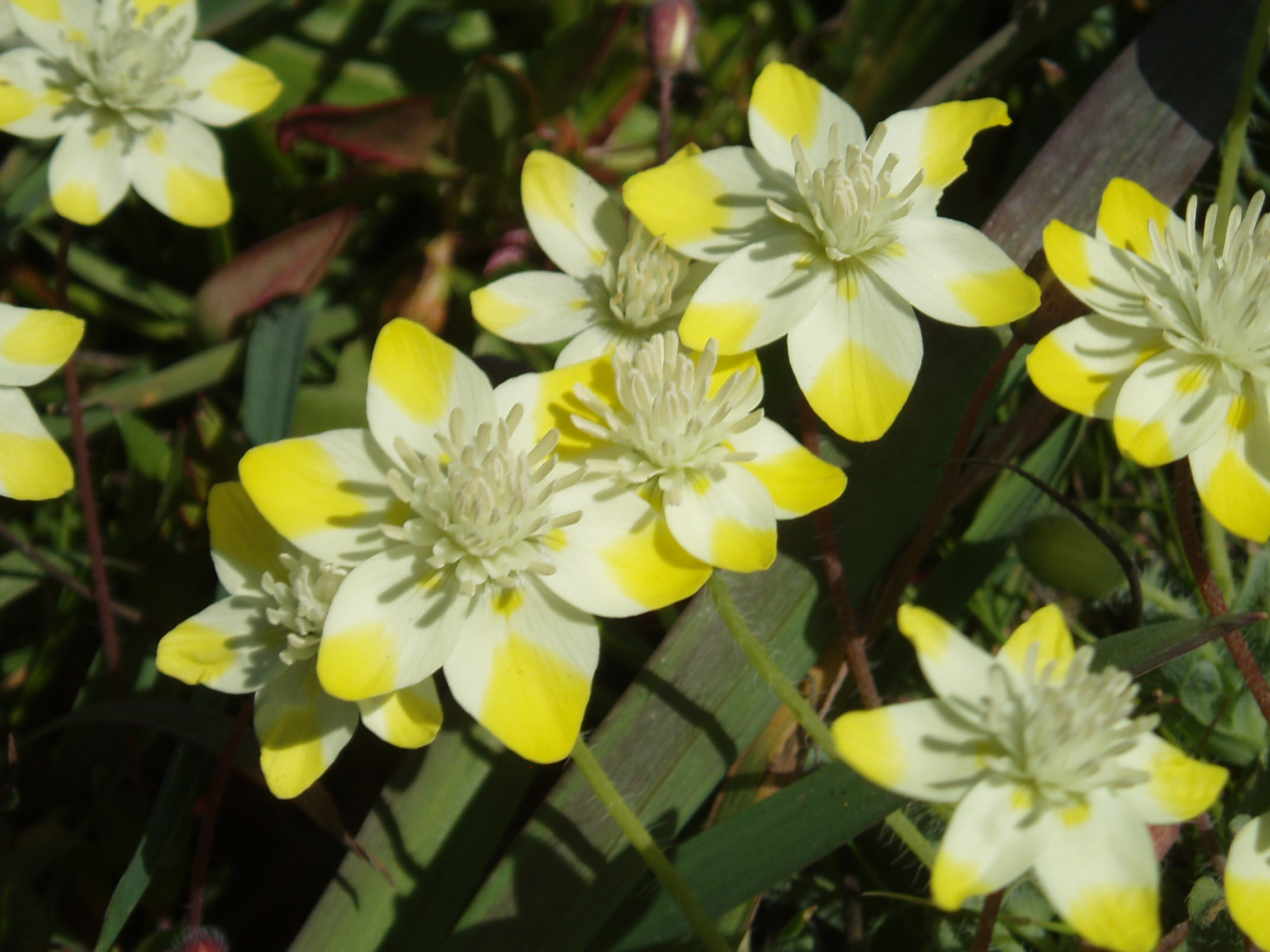
Creamcups (Platystemon californicus)

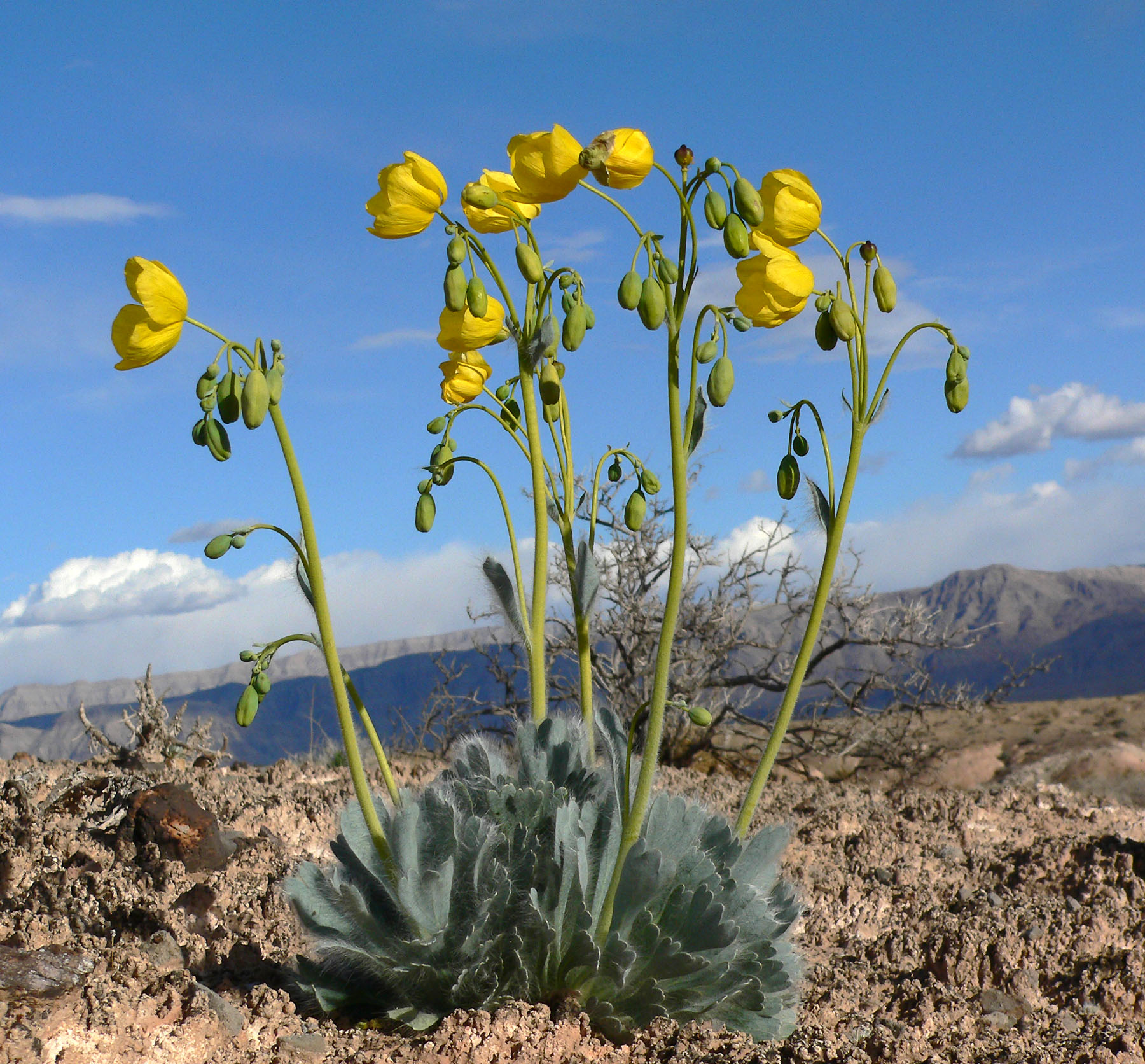
Bearpaw poppy (Arctomecon californica)

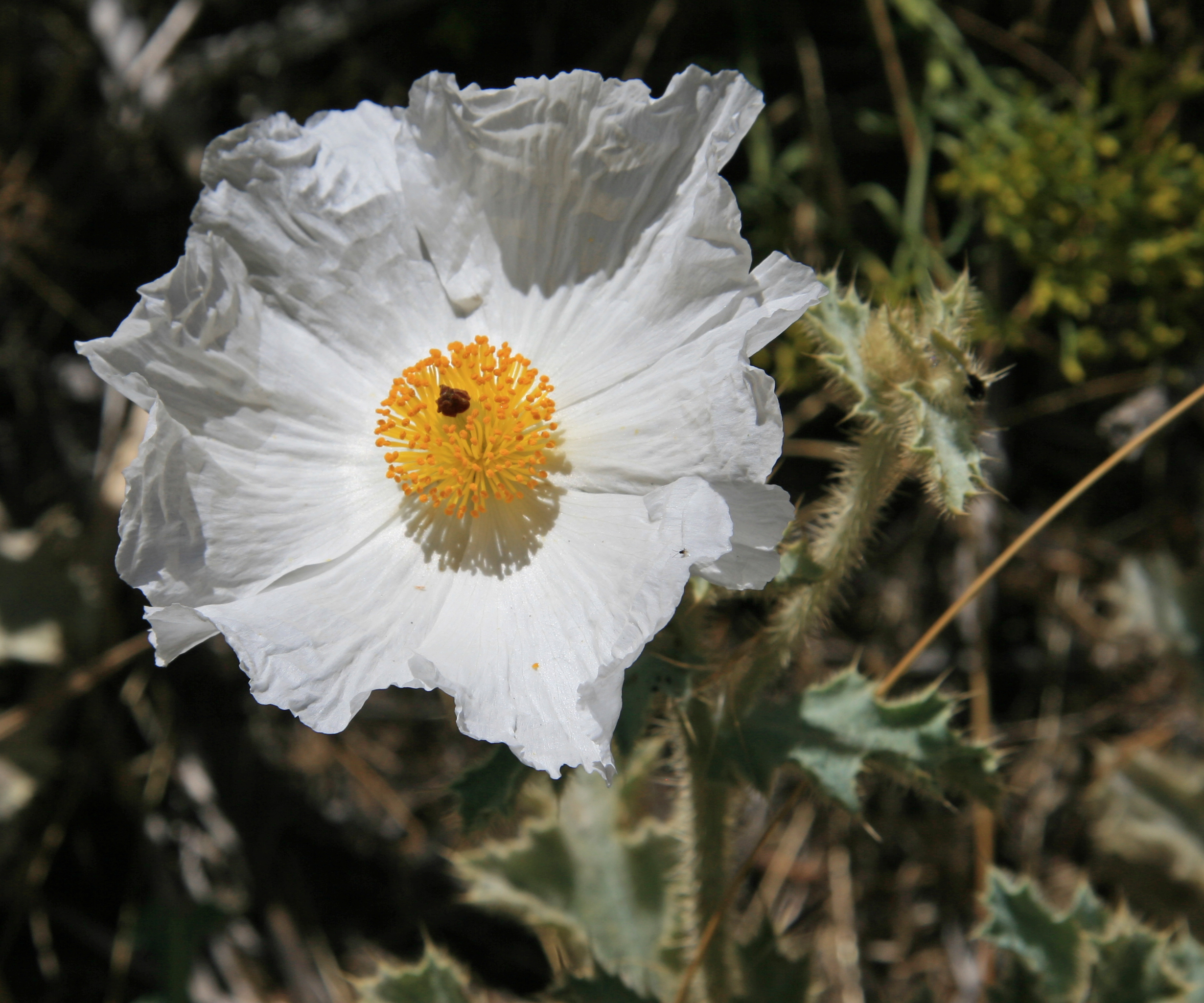
Flat-bud prickly poppy (Arctomecon munita)

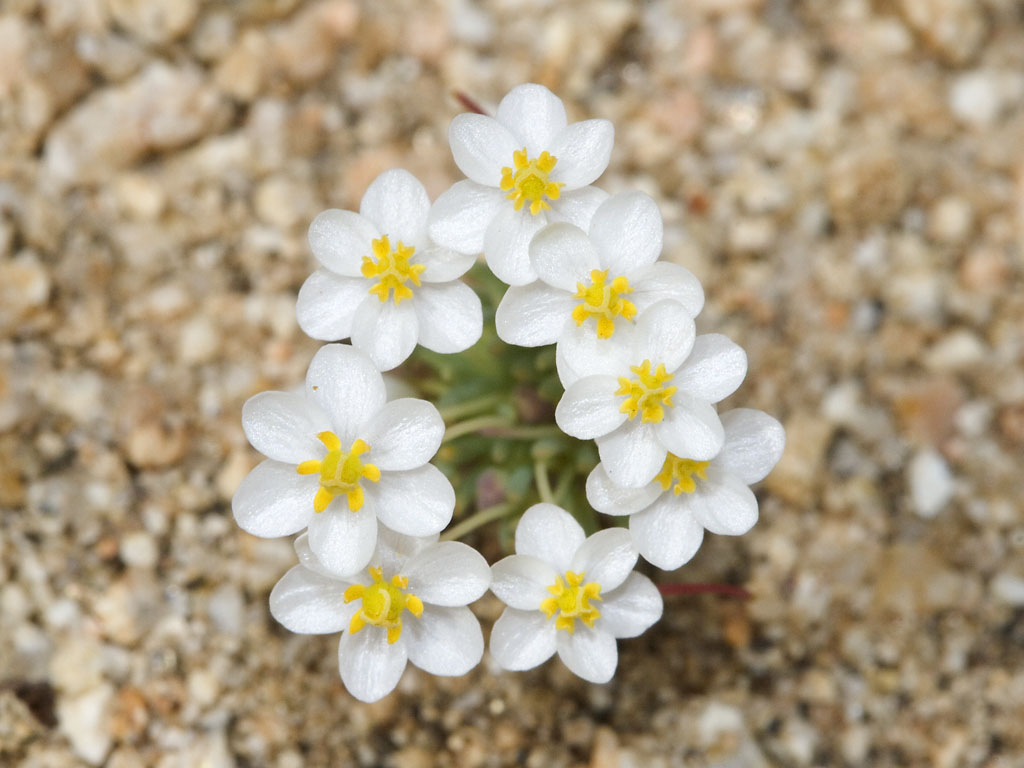
Pygmy poppy (Canbya candida)

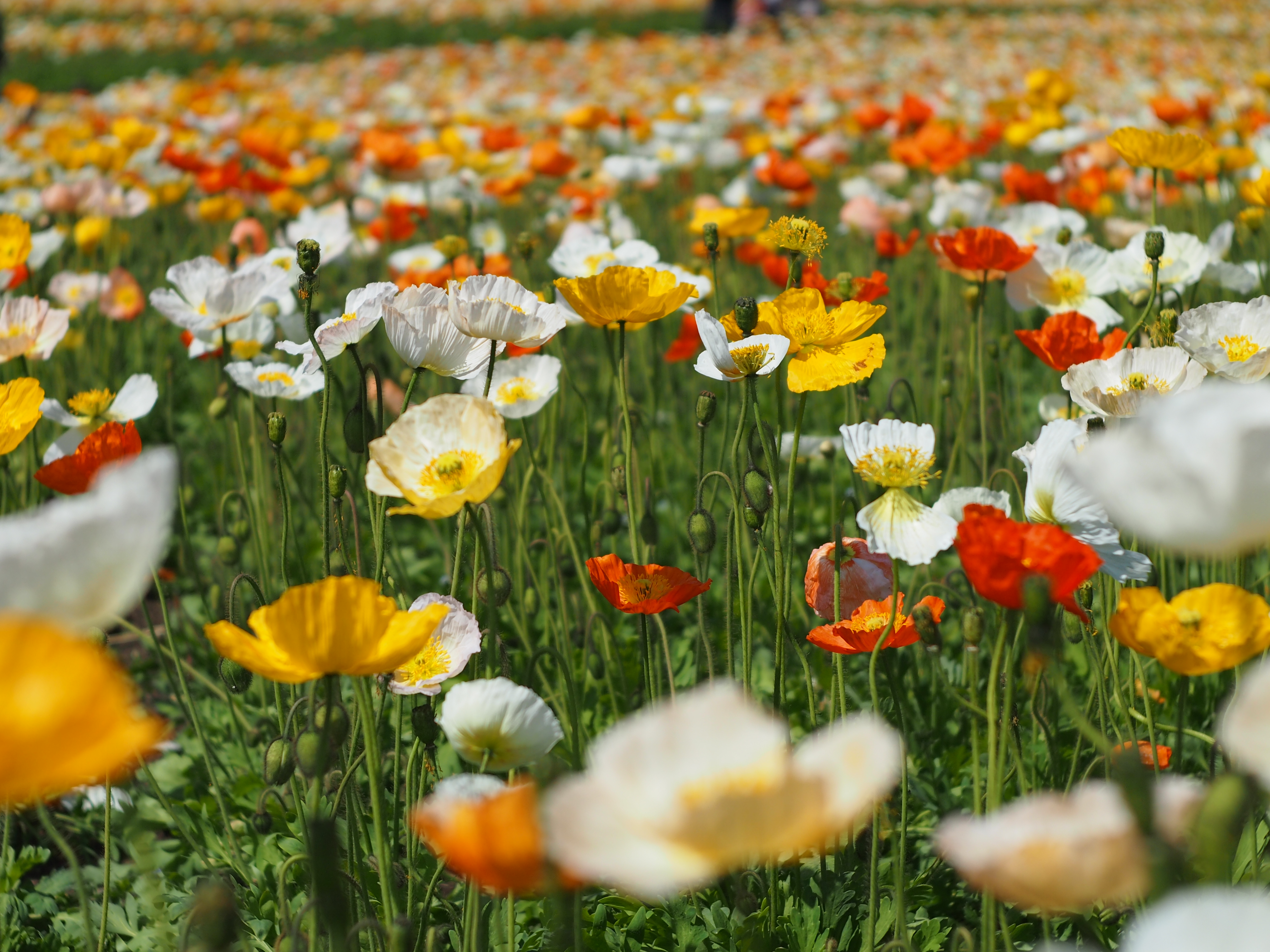
Arctic poppy (Papaver nudicaule)

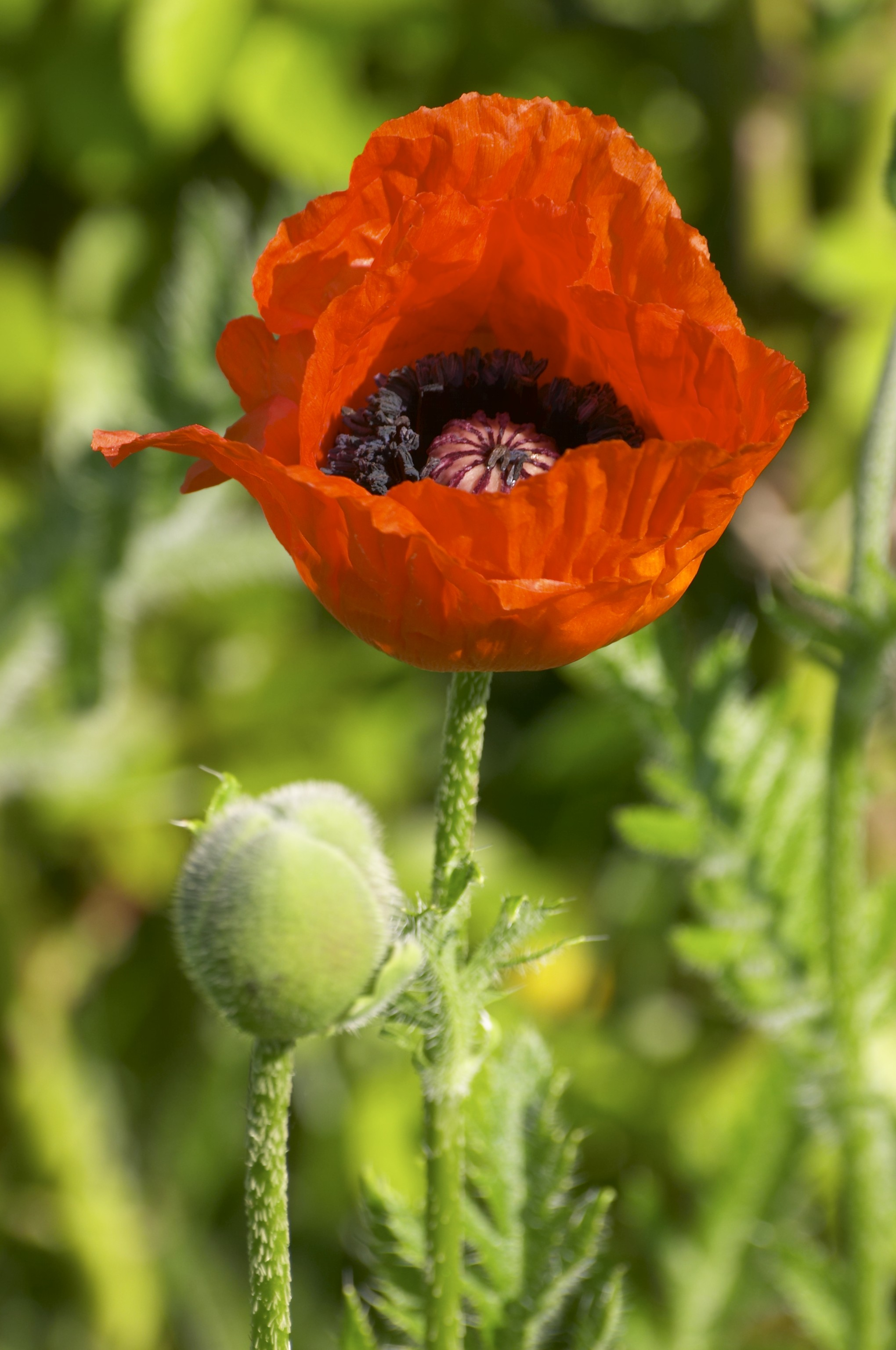
Persian poppy (Papaver bracteatum)

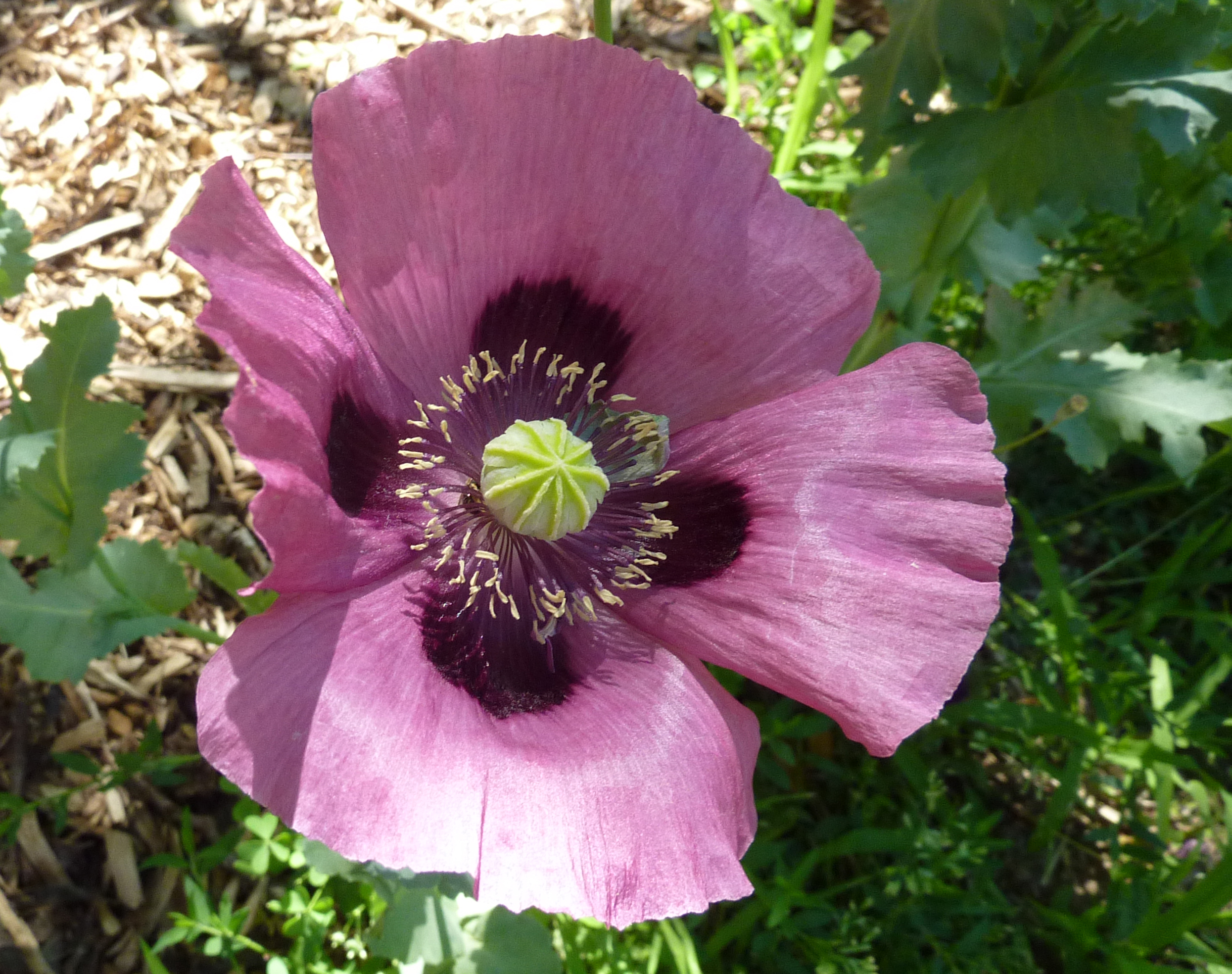
Opium poppy (Papaver somniferum)

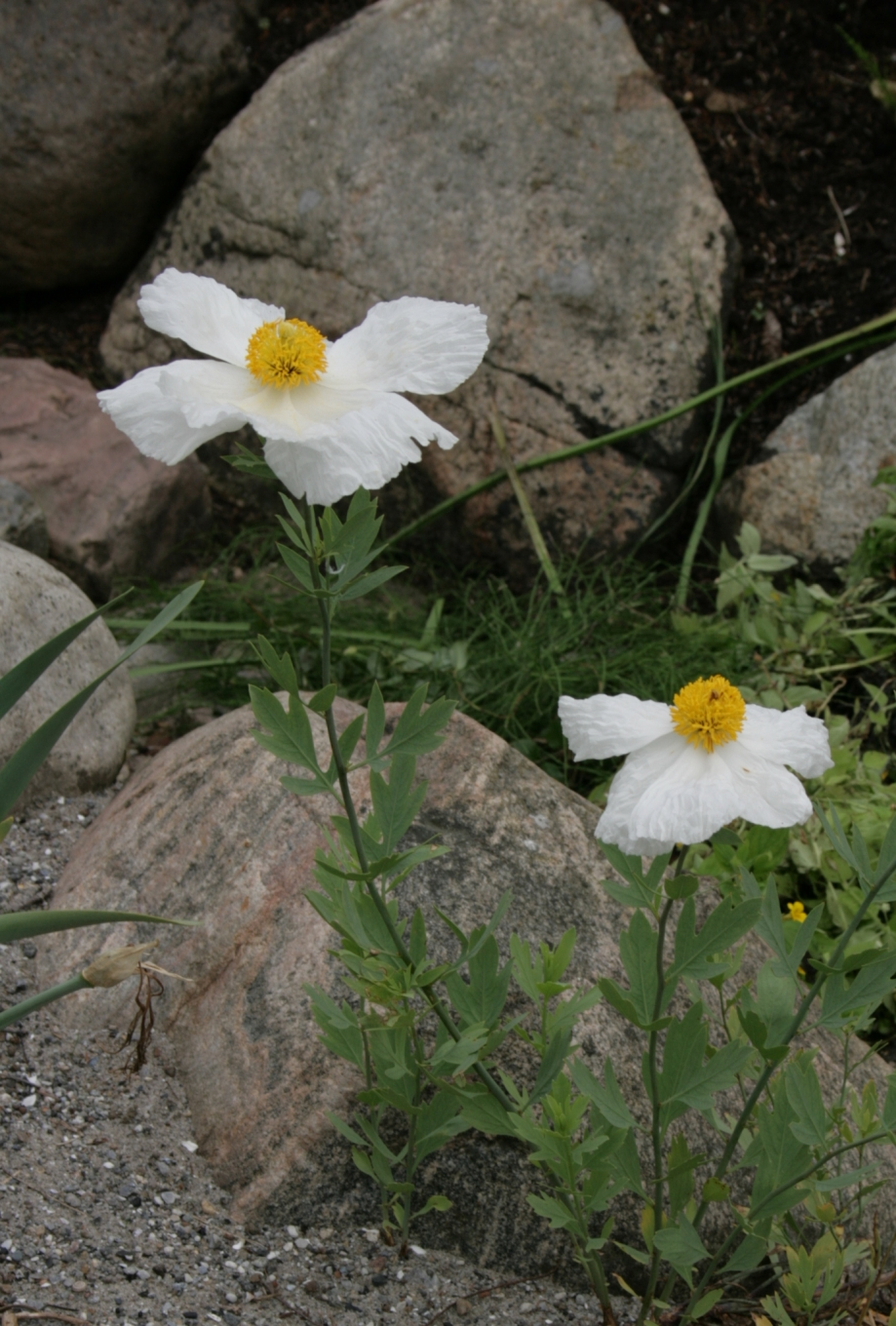
Matilija poppy (Romneya coulteri)

== Ecology ==
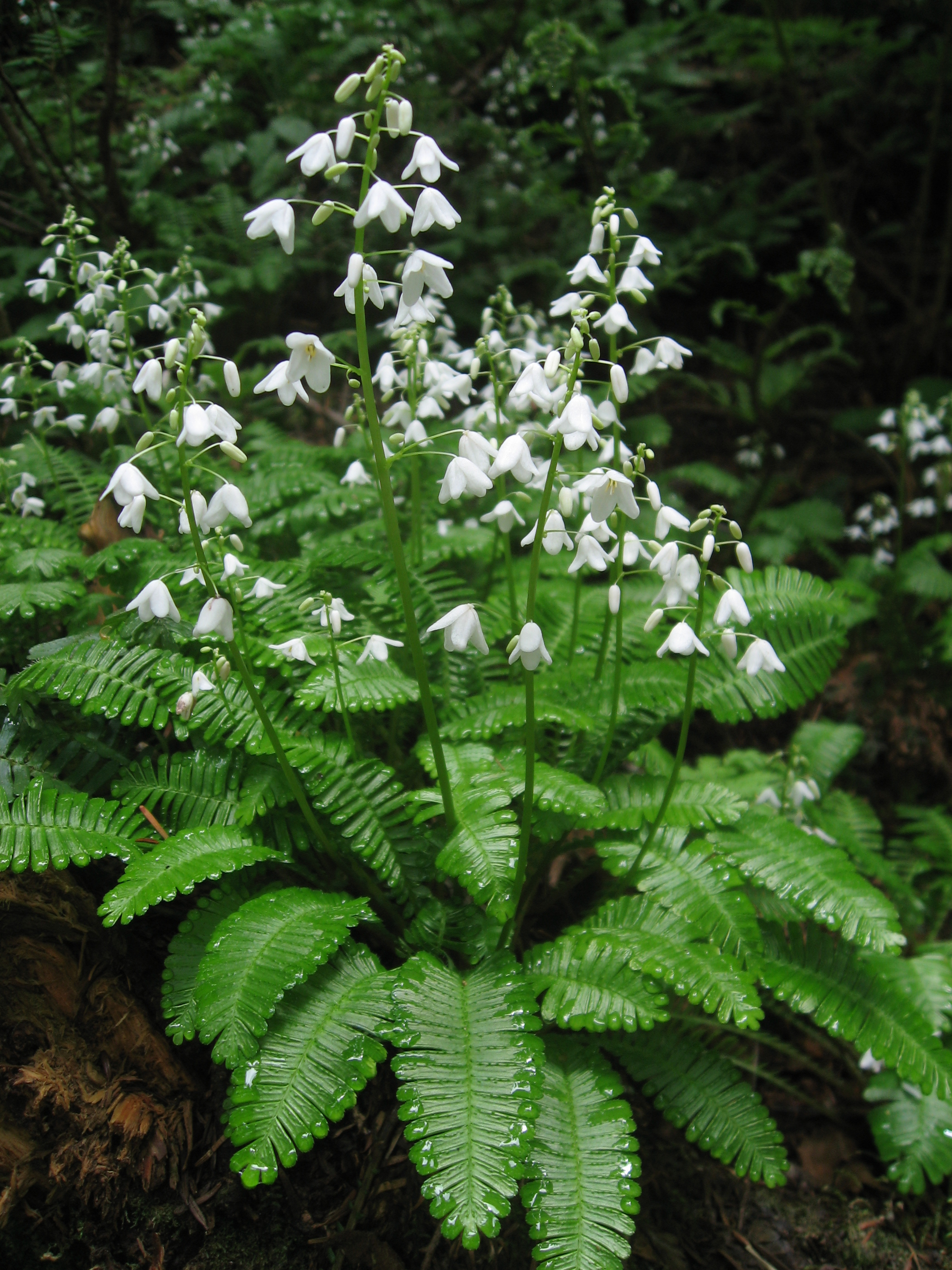
Fern-poppy (Pteridophyllum racemosum)

Pollination is entomophile (basically by flies and wasps and bees, less often by beetles), except in Bocconia and Macleaya. In Papaveroideae, the reward is pollen as there is no nectar. The visual attractant is the petals that are usually brightly coloured and often have basal guides, sometimes the attractant can also be the androecium as the petals do not last long. Some species, mostly those from the arctic and alpine regions, reinforce their attraction with floral fragrance (for example, Papaver alpinum smells of cloves), which in the case of Romneya drugs the insects. The anthers and stigmas mature at the same time, but Bocconia is clearly protogynous, the stigmas emerge from the calyx that encloses them. Autopollination is common and in some cases (for example, Roemeria hybrida) it occurs before the bud opens (cleistogamy). The presence of an aril suggests dispersion of seeds by ants (myrmecochory), once they have been expelled by the fruit. In the case of Bocconia the seeds remain attached to the replums after the capsule's valves have fallen leaving their brilliant red or orange arils exposed, which attract birds to feed on them, facilitating their dispersal (ornithochory). Seeds that lack an aril appear to be dispersed by the wind (anemochory) for capsules that open, in the other cases they are freed when the fruit decomposes. Many Fumarioideae species have explosive fruits (ballistic), while Rupicapnos and Sarcocapnos species are chasmophytes, growing on rocks, and their fruit's peduncles and pedicels are geotropic and they lengthen so that the seeds bury into the base of the plant.

The Papaveroideae typically grow in cooler and wooded areas, forming part of the undergrowth. They have adapted to arctic and alpine habitats and to arid, Mediterranean areas, many species are ruderal and segetal (growing in cornfields). Pteridophyllum grows in the undergrowth of woods of needle-leaved trees between 1,000 and 2,000 metres (3,300 and 6,600 ft). The Fumarioideae are basically found in open, rocky, alpine landscapes or vertical or overhanging cracks, while some species are ruderal or segetal.

== Phytochemistry ==
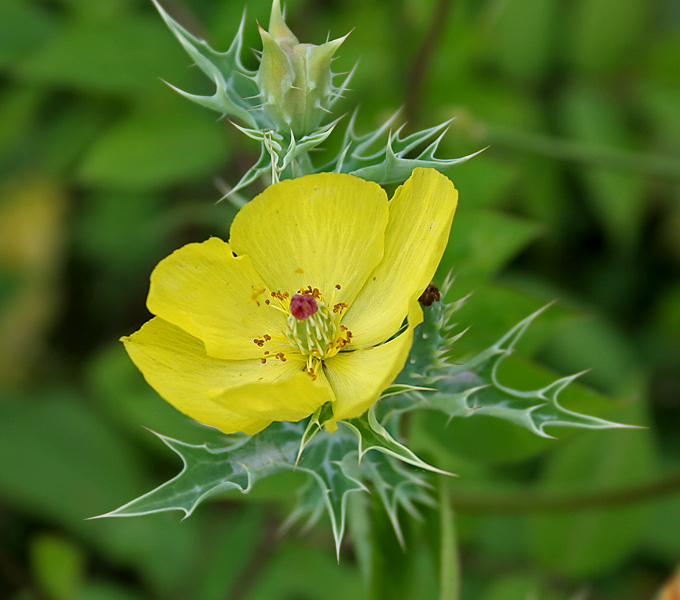
Mexican prickly poppy (Argemone mexicana)

Alkaloids: The isoquinolinic alkaloids present in the family are well known. They are derived from berberine, tetrahydroberberine, protopine and benzophenanthridine in Papaveroideae, and from spirobenzylisoquinoline and cularine in Fumarioideae, as well as from other groups that give them pharmacological properties: derivatives of aporphine, morphinan, pavine, isopavine, narceine and rhoeadine.

Others: Other characteristic substances contained within these species include: meconic acid and chelidonic acid, as well as cyanogenic glycoside compounds derived from tyrosine: dhurrin and triglochinin; in the Fumarioideae while the Chelidonieae contain the free amino acid δ-acetylornithine.

Flavonoids: Iridoids and proanthocyanidins absent. Flavonols, kaempferol and/or quercetin present.

Many of these plants are poisonous. The Mexican prickly poppy is poisonous if taken internally and may cause oedema and glaucoma. Even if an animal, such as a goat, should persist in grazing on this plant, not only will the animal suffer but so will those who drink its milk, because the poisons are passed along in the milk.

== Fossil record ==
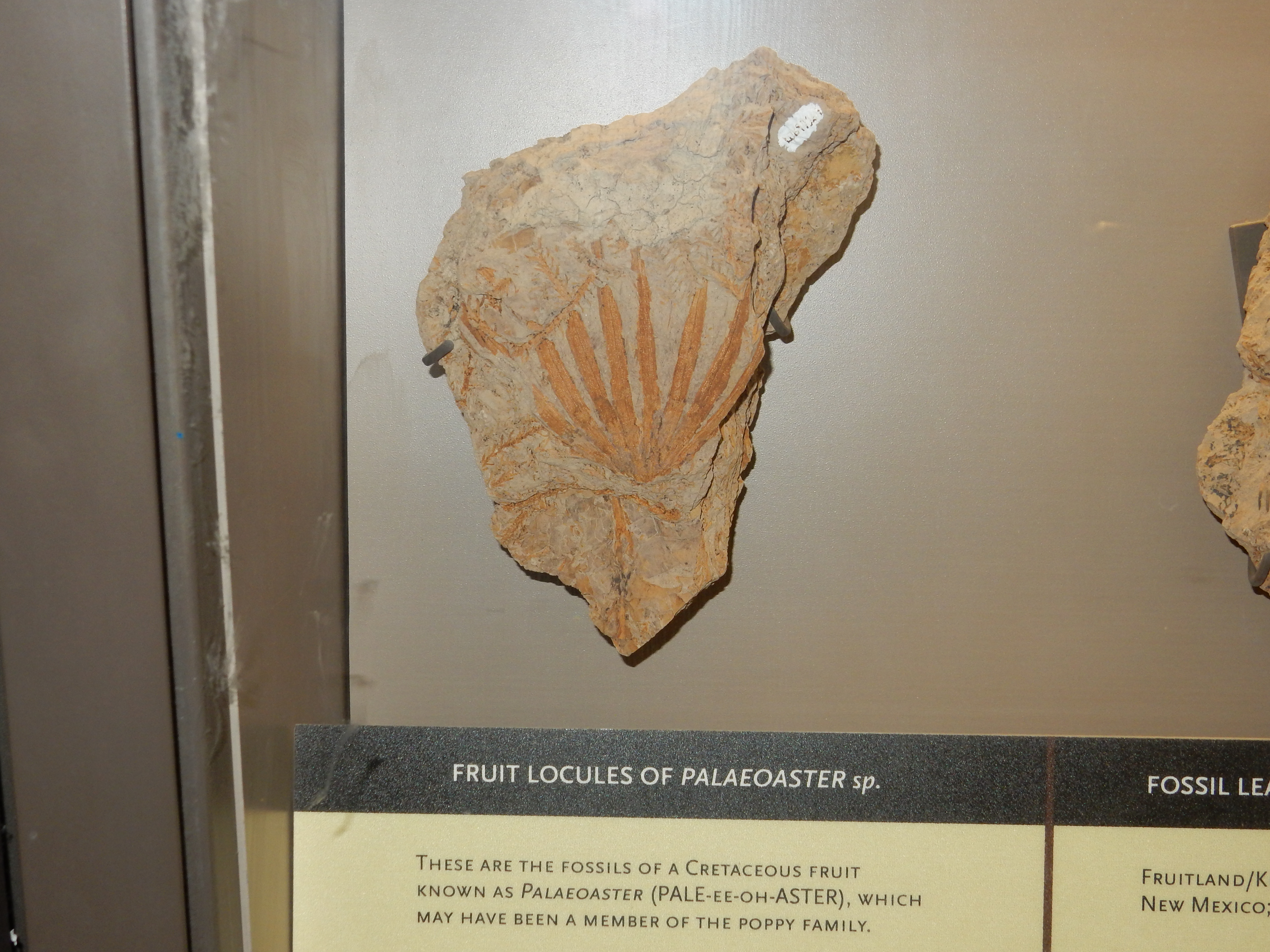
Paleoaster sp.

The fossils of the late Cretaceous poppy Palaeoaster inquirenda from the Western Interior of North America occurs from 74.5-million-year-old deposits in the Fruitland Formation in New Mexico to 64.5-million-year-old deposits in the Hell Creek Formation in North Dakota. Dehiscent fruit fossils of Palaeoaster have been found at the excavation site for the well-known Tyrannosaurus rex specimen BHI 3033. The seed capsule of Palaeoaster has some similarities to that of the extant poppy genus Romneya.

Papaverites, a fossil fruit from the Eocene of Germany, may be associated with Papaveraceae. Chesters et al. (1967) mentions Papaver pictum from the Oligocene of England.

== Cultivation ==
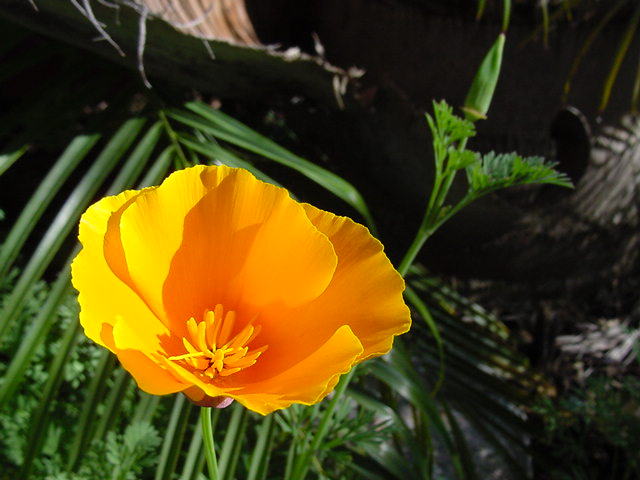
California poppy (Eschscholzia californica)

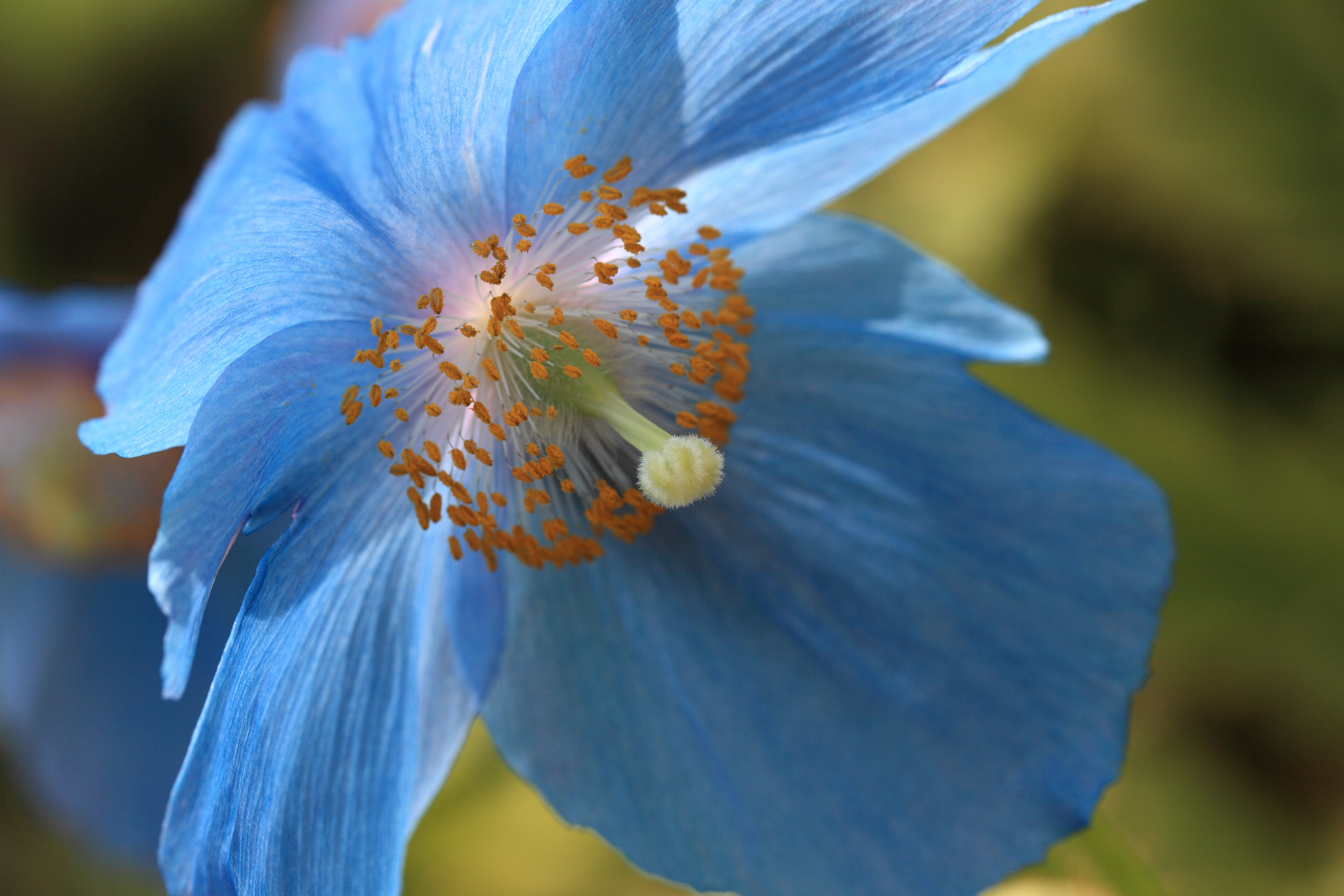
Himalayan blue poppy (Meconopsis betonicifolia)

The family is well known for its striking flowers, with many species grown as ornamental plants, including California poppy (Eschscholtzia californica, the California state flower), the stunning blue Himalayan poppies (Meconopsis), several species of Papaver, and the wildflower bloodroot. Only two species are of economic importance for the production of opium and its derivatives for pharmaceutical use: Papaver somniferum is cultivated legally in order to obtain morphine and other opiates, and Papaver bracteatum, for thebaine. Papaver somniferum is also the source of the poppy seeds used in cooking and baking, and poppy seed oil. The illegal cultivation of poppies in Asia for the production of opium and heroin is virtually equal to the legal production in the rest of the world. Some Funarioideae have a limited use in gardening, with Lamprocapnos spectabilis ("bleeding heart"), and Pseudofumaria lutea ("yellow corydalis") commonly used. Chinese traditional medicine used the boiled and dried tubers of Corydalis yanhusuo ("yanhusuo").

== Symbolism ==
The opium poppy and corn poppy are symbols, respectively, of sleep and death. In Great Britain, Canada, the United States, and Australia the corn poppy is worn in remembrance of World War I.

== Bibliography ==
- Angiosperm Phylogeny Group (2009). "An update of the Angiosperm Phylogeny Group classification for the orders and families of flowering plants: APG III". Botanical Journal of the Linnean Society. 161 (2): 105–121. doi:10.1111/j.1095-8339.2009.00996.x. hdl:10654/18083.
- Blattner, Frank R. & Kadereit, Joachim W. (1999). "Morphological evolution and ecological diversification of the forest-dwelling poppies (Papaveraceae: Chelidonioideae) as deduced from a molecular phylogeny of the ITS region". Plant Systematics and Evolution. 219 (3–4): 181–197. Bibcode:1999PSyEv.219..181B. doi:10.1007/bf00985578. S2CID 28548382.
- Carolan, James C.; Hook, Ingrid L.I.; Chase, Mark W.; Kadereit, Joachim W. & Hodkinson, Trevor R. (2006). "Phylogenetics of Papaver and Related Genera Based on DNA Sequences from ITS Nuclear Ribosomal DNA and Plastid trnL Intron and trnL–F Intergenic Spacers". Annals of Botany. 98 (1): 141–155. doi:10.1093/aob/mcl079. PMC 2803553. PMID 16675606.
- Christenhusz, M. J. M. & Byng, J. W. (2016). "The number of known plants species in the world and its annual increase". Phytotaxa. 261 (3): 201–217. doi:10.11646/phytotaxa.261.3.1.
- Friedel, Jean (1927). "Filiation des Papavéracées". Bulletin de la Société Botanique de France (in French). 74 (4): 673–688. Bibcode:1927BSBF...74..673F. doi:10.1080/00378941.1927.10833678.
- Hoot, S.B.; Kadereit, J.W.; Blattner, F.R.; Jork, K.B.; Schwarzbach, A.E. & Crane, P.R. (1997). "Data congruence and phylogeny of the Papaveraceae s.l. based on four data sets: atpB and rbcL sequences, trnK restriction sites, and morphological characters". Systematic Botany. 22 (3): 575–590. doi:10.2307/2419829. JSTOR 2419829.
- Kadereit, J.W. (1993). "Papaveraceae". In Kubitzki, Rohwer & Bittrich (1993)
- Kadereit, J.W.; Schwarzbach, A.E.; Jork, K.B. (1997). "The phylogeny of Papaver s.l. (Papaveraceae): polyphyly or monophyly?". Plant Systematics and Evolution. 204 (1–2): 75–98. Bibcode:1997PSyEv.204...75K. doi:10.1007/bf00982533. S2CID 20019969.
- Kubitzki, K.; Rohwer, J.G.; Bittrich, V., eds. (1993). The Families and Genera of Vascular Plants. II. Flowering Plants - Dicotyledons. Berlin: Springer-Verlag. ISBN 978-3-540-55509-4.
- Lidén, M. (1993a). "Fumariaceae". In Kubitzki, Rohwer & Bittrich (1993)
- Lidén, M. (1993b). "Pteridophyllaceae". In Kubitzki, Rohwer & Bittrich (1993)
- Lidén, M.; Fukuhara, T.; Rylander, J. & Oxelman, B. (1997). "Phylogeny and classification of Fumariaceae, with emphasis on Dicentra s.l., based on the plastid gene rps16 intron". Plant Systematics and Evolution. 206 (1–4): 411–420. Bibcode:1997PSyEv.206..411L. doi:10.1007/bf00987960. S2CID 24285424.
- Smith, Una R. (2001). "Revision of the Cretaceous Fossil Genus Palaeoaster (Papaveraceae) and Clarification of Pertinent Species of Eriocaulon, Palaeoaster and Sterculiocarpus". Novon. 11 (2): 258–260. doi:10.2307/3393064. JSTOR 3393064.
- Stace, Clive (2010). New Flora of the British Isles. Cambridge University Press. ISBN 978-1-139-48649-1.
- Wang, W.; Lu, A.-M.; Ren, Y.; Endress, M.E. & Chen, Z.-D. (2009). "Phylogeny and classification of Ranunculales: Evidence from four molecular loci and morphological data". Perspectives in Plant Ecology, Evolution and Systematics. 11 (2): 81–110. Bibcode:2009PPEES..11...81W. doi:10.1016/j.ppees.2009.01.001.
- Watson, L. & Dallwitz, M.J. (1992–2006). "The families of flowering plants: descriptions, illustrations, identification, and information retrieval. Version: 29th July 2006". Archived from the original on 3 January 2007.
- Willemstein, S. C. (1987). An Evolutionary Basis for Pollination Ecology. E. J. Brill / Leiden University Press Leiden. ISBN 90-04-08457-6. (pbk.)
- Colombo, M (February 1996). "Pharmacological Activities Ofchelidonium Majusl. (Papaveraceae)". Pharmacological Research. 33 (2): 127–134. doi:10.1006/phrs.1996.0019. PMID 8870028.
- Kalis, A.J. (November 1979). "Papaveraceae". Review of Palaeobotany and Palynology. 28 (3–4): A209–A260. Bibcode:1979RPaPa..28.A209K. doi:10.1016/0034-6667(79)90034-4. hdl:1874/24969.
- Güler, Döne Aslı; Aydın, Ali; Koyuncu, Mesut; Parmaksız, İskender; Tekin, Şaban (26 August 2016). "Anticancer Activity of Papaver Somniferum". Journal of the Turkish Chemical Society, Section A: Chemistry. 3 (3). doi:10.18596/jotcsa.43273.
- Labanca, Fabiana; Ovesnà, Jaroslava; Milella, Luigi (August 2018). "Papaver somniferum L. taxonomy, uses and new insight in poppy alkaloid pathways". Phytochemistry Reviews. 17 (4): 853–871. Bibcode:2018PChRv..17..853L. doi:10.1007/s11101-018-9563-3.
- Li, Yi; Winzer, Thilo; He, Zhesi; Graham, Ian A. (March 2020). "Over 100 Million Years of Enzyme Evolution Underpinning the Production of Morphine in the Papaveraceae Family of Flowering Plants". Plant Communications. 1 (2) 100029. Bibcode:2020PlCom...100029L. doi:10.1016/j.xplc.2020.100029. PMC 7357826. PMID 32685922.
- Native Plants (PAPAVERACEAE, THE POPPY FAMILY, n.d.,) https://nativeplants.org/wp-content/uploads/papaveraceae.pdf
- Nemat, O (2023). "MAKING THE POPPY BAN STICK". World Today. 79 (4): 19–22.
- Labanca, Fabiana; Ovesnà, Jaroslava; Milella, Luigi (August 2018). "Papaver somniferum L. taxonomy, uses and new insight in poppy alkaloid pathways". Phytochemistry Reviews. 17 (4): 853–871. Bibcode:2018PChRv..17..853L. doi:10.1007/s11101-018-9563-3.
