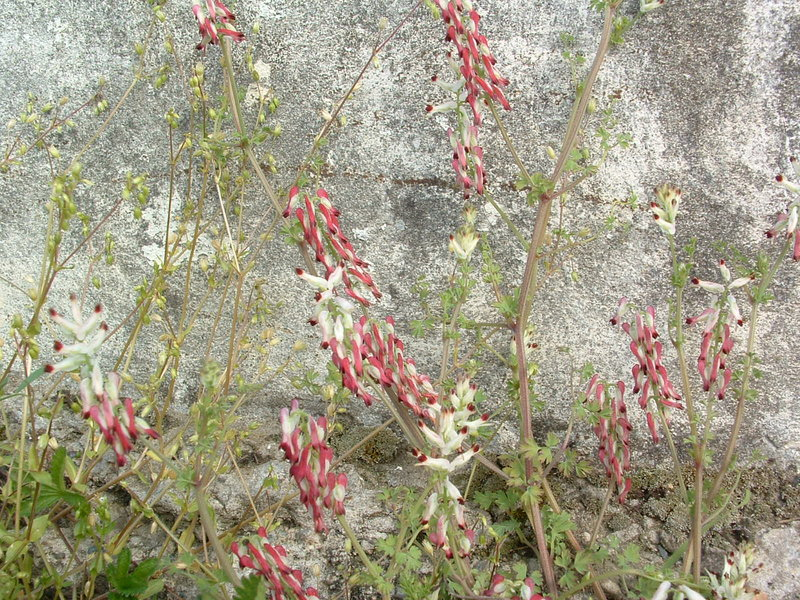
- Fumaria muralis

Scientific classification
- Kingdom: Plantae
- Clade: Embryophytes
- Clade: Tracheophytes
- Clade: Spermatophytes
- Clade: Angiosperms
- Clade: Eudicots
- Order: Ranunculales
- Family: Papaveraceae
- Subfamily: Fumarioideae; Eaton

= Fumarioideae =

Subfamily of flowering plants

Fumarioideae is a subfamily of the family Papaveraceae (the poppy family). It was formerly treated as a separate family, the Fumariaceae (the fumitory, fumewort or bleeding-heart family). It consists of about 575 species of herbaceous plants in 20 genera, native to the Northern Hemisphere and South Africa. The largest genus is Corydalis (with 470 species).

== Description ==
=== Flower shape ===
Plants in the fumitory subfamily are easily recognised by their peculiar flowers with two dissimilar pairs of petals. One or both of the outer petals is usually spurred, and the inner petals are connected at tip.

There are two types of flowers. A given genus has one type or the other. Dicentra has flowers with two planes of symmetry, and Corydalis has flowers with one plane of symmetry (zygomorphic).

=== Leaves ===
Most species have compound leaves.

== Taxonomy ==
The APG IV system of 2016 (unchanged from the earlier 1998 APG system, the 2003 APG II system, and the APG III system of 2009) includes the former family Fumariaceae within the Papaveraceae. The APG II system provided for its optional segregation as a separate family, but this option is not provided in the current APG IV system or the APG III system.

=== Genera ===
There are 20 genera:

- Hypecoum (18 species)
- Lamprocapnos (1)
- Ichtyoselmis (1)
- Ehrendorferia (2)
- Adlumia (2)
- Capnoides (1)
- Ceratocapnos (3)
- Corydalis (470)
- Cryptocapnos (1)
- Cysticapnos (4)
- Dactylicapnos (13)
- Dicentra (8)
- Discocapnos (1)
- Fumaria (50)
- Fumariola (1)
- Platycapnos (3)
- Pseudofumaria (2)
- Rupicapnos (7)
- Sarcocapnos (5)
- Trigonocapnos (1)
- †Potomacapnos

== See also ==
- Bicuculline, a toxin found in plans of this subfamily
