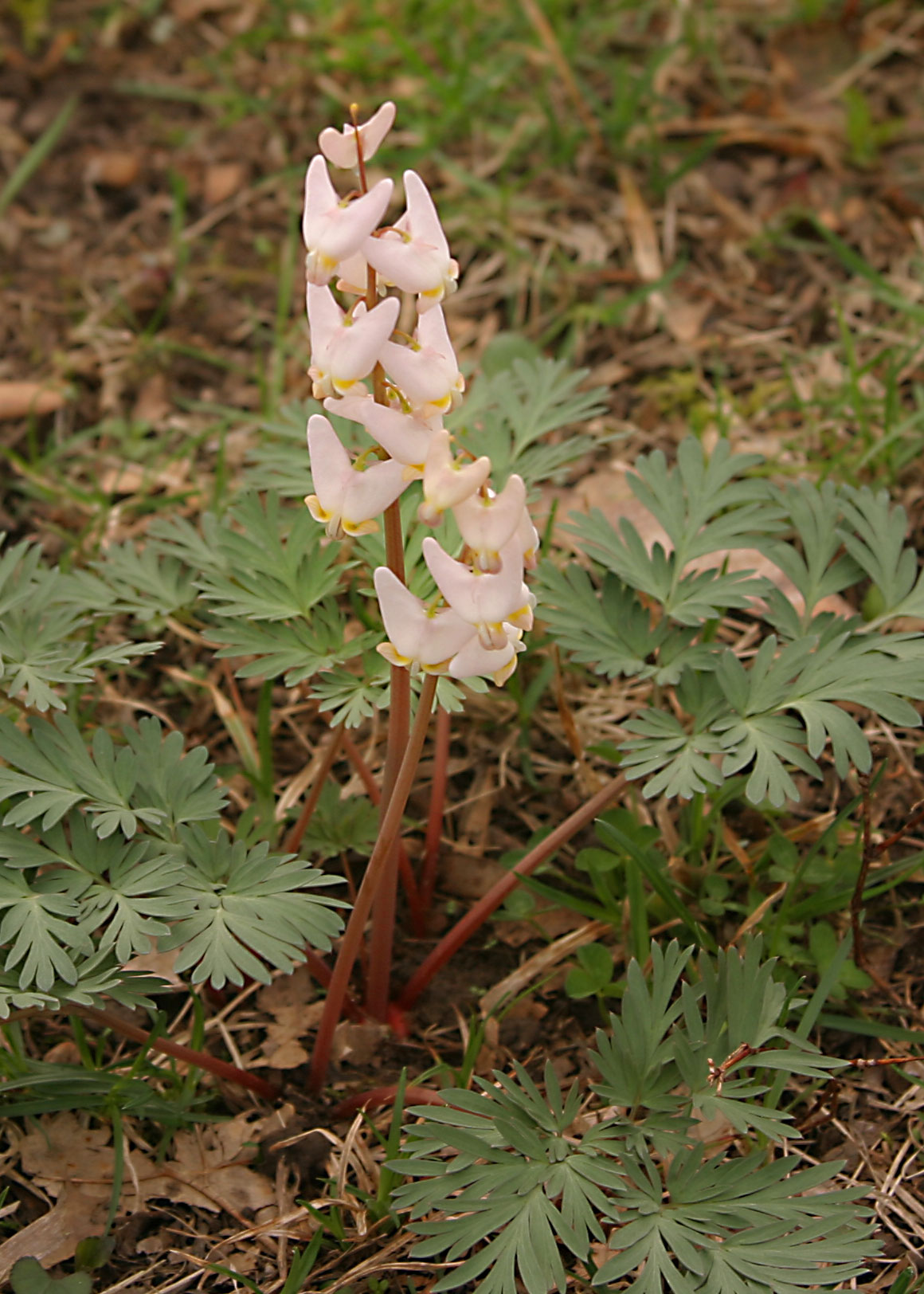
- Dicentra cucullaria (type species)

Scientific classification
- Kingdom: Plantae
- Clade: Embryophytes
- Clade: Tracheophytes
- Clade: Spermatophytes
- Clade: Angiosperms
- Clade: Eudicots
- Order: Ranunculales
- Family: Papaveraceae
- Subfamily: Fumarioideae
- Tribe: Fumarieae
- Subtribe: Corydalinae
- Genus: Dicentra; Bernh.

Species
- 8 (see below)

Synonyms
- Diclytra Borkh. nom. rej.; Dielytra, orthographic variant of Diclytra; Possible synonyms: Lamprocapnos Endl.; Ehrendorferia Fukuhara & Lidén; Ichtyoselmis Lidén & Fukuhara

= Dicentra =

Genus of flowering plants in the poppy family

Dicentra (Greek dís "twice", kéntron "spur"), known collectively as the bleeding-hearts, is a genus containing eight species of herbaceous flowering perennial plants with unique, "heart"-shaped flowers and finely divided foliage. The species are, primarily, native to North America, although several are found in temperate East Asia.

== Description and growth requirements ==
Flowers have two tiny sepals and four petals. The flowers are bisymmetric: the two outer petals are spurred or pouched at the base and curved outwards or backwards at the tip, and the two inner ones with or without a crest at the tip. In Dicentra, all leaves are in a basal rosette, and flowers are on leafless stalks. In other genera with bisymmetric heart-shaped flowers (Lamprocapnos, Dactylicapnos, Ichtyoselmis, Ehrendorferia), leaves grow on stems as well as from the root. Each of the two compound stamens is composed of one median and two lateral half stamens fused together. The stamens and pistil are held between the inner petals.

Native to Northeastern Asia, the Pacific Northwest, as well as parts of the eastern United States, Dicentra almost universally prefer growing in cool, temperate, wet forests with excellent drainage, often growing side-by-side with ferns, Hosta, mosses, and other shade- or dappled-light-loving species, depending on location and region. While Dicentra will bloom in filtered light or shade, if grown in poorly-drained soil and intense lighting, they will not bloom or thrive.

Seeds with elaiosomes are borne in long capsules.

All parts of Dicentra are poisonous if ingested.

== Taxonomy ==
=== Current species ===
The genus Dicentra includes plants whose flowers and leaves grow on stems directly from the roots. Species with branching stems used to be included in the genus, but have now been moved to other genera.

Image	Scientific name	Common name	Distribution
	Dicentra canadensis (Goldie) Walp.	squirrel-corn	eastern North America
	Dicentra cucullaria (L.) Bernh.	Dutchman's-breeches	eastern North America, with a disjunct population in the Columbia Basin
	Dicentra eximia (Ker-Gawl.) Torr.	fringed bleeding-heart, turkey-corn	Appalachian Mountains
	Dicentra formosa (Haw.) Walp.	western or Pacific bleeding-heart	Pacific Coast of North America
	Dicentra nevadensis Eastw.	Sierra bleeding-heart	Sierra Nevada peaks of Tulare and Fresno Counties, endemic to central eastern California
	Dicentra pauciflora S. Wats.	short-horn steer's-head	Oregon and California
	Dicentra peregrina (Rudolphi) Makino	komakusa	Japan, the Kuril Islands, Sakhalin Island, and northeastern Siberia
	Dicentra uniflora Kellogg	long-horn steer's-head	western North America

=== Former species ===
The genera Dactylicapnos, Ichtyoselmis, Ehrendorferia and Lamprocapnos were previously included as subgenera in Dicentra, but have been shown not to belong in this genus (see for example Flora of China)

- Dactylicapnos Wall. (14 species of herbaceous climbers with yellow flowers, Himalaya to SW China)
  - Dactylicapnos burmanica (K.R.Stern) Lidén
  - Dactylicapnos grandifoliolata Merrill (Dicentra paucinervia K.R.Stern)
  - Dactylicapnos lichiangensis (Fedde) Hand.-Mazz.
  - Dactylicapnos macrocapnos (Prain) Hutchinson
  - Dactylicapnos roylei (Hook.f. & Th.) Hutchinson
  - Dactylicapnos scandens (D.Don) Hutchinson
  - Dactylicapnos schneideri (Fedde) Lidén
  - Dactylicapnos gaoligongshanensis Lidén
  - Dactylicapnos torulosa (Hook.f. & Th.) Hutchinson (Dicentra wolfdietheri Fedde)
  - Dactylicapnos cordata Lidén
- Ehrendorferia Lidén (2 species of erect robust herbaceous perennials with yellow or cream erect flowers, Western N America)
  - Ehrendorferia ochroleuca (Engelm.) Lidén=Dicentra ochroleuca Engelm.
  - Ehrendorferia chrysantha (Hook. & Arn.) Lidén. Golden Ear-drops=Dicentra chrysantha Hook. & Arn.
- Ichtyoselmis Lidén (1 species of large herbaceous perennial with serrate leaflets and large drooping cream flowers, China, Burma)
  - Ichtyoselmis macrantha (Oliver) Lidén
- Lamprocapnos Endlicher (1 species of herbaceous perennial with large pink flowers in horizontal racemes, NE China, Korea)
  - Lamprocapnos spectabilis (L.) Fukuhara bleeding heart=Dicentra spectabilis Lem.

== Cultivation ==
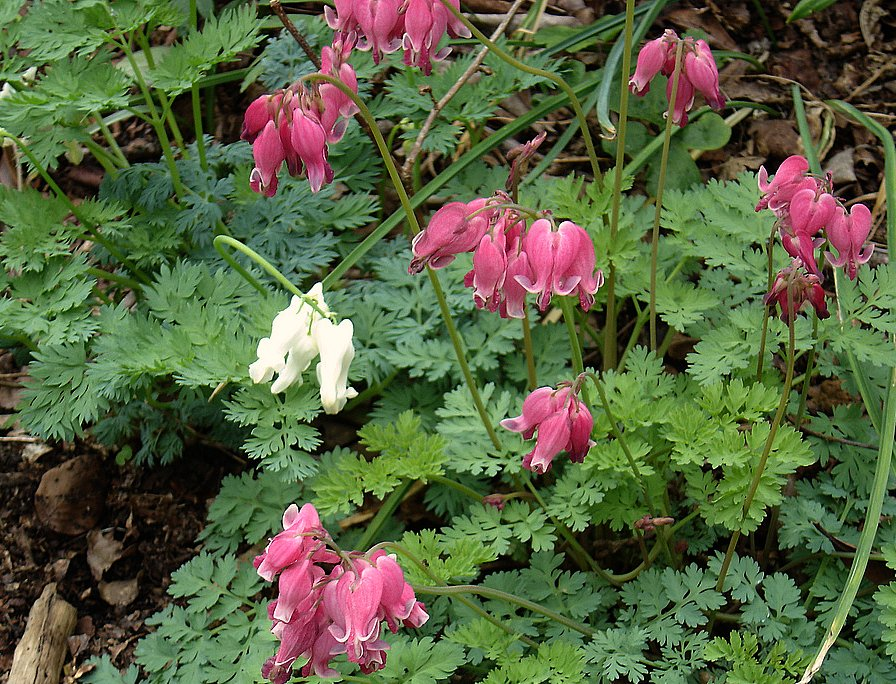
Two bleeding-heart hybrids: Dicentra 'King of Hearts' (deep pink) and Dicentra 'Ivory Hearts' (white)

There are several hybrids and cultivars involving Dicentra eximia, Dicentra formosa, and Dicentra peregrina, including (those marked agm have gained the Royal Horticultural Society's Award of Garden Merit):

- Dicentra 'Aurora' — Dicentra formosa × Dicentra eximia — white flowers
- D. formosa 'Bacchanal' (agm) — deep red
- Dicentra 'Ivory Hearts' — Dicentra peregrina × Dicentra eximia 'Alba' — white
- Dicentra 'King of Hearts' — Dicentra peregrina × (Dicentra formosa subsp. oregana × Dicentra eximia)
- D. formosa 'Langtrees' (agm)
- Dicentra 'Luxuriant' (agm) — Dicentra formosa × Dicentra eximia × Dicentra peregrina
- Dicentra 'Stuart Boothman' (agm)

Hybrids involving Dicentra peregrina are often intolerant of hot, humid climates and sun, like the species itself.
