= Bleeding heart =

Bleeding heart may refer to:

== Flowering plants ==
- Bleeding-heart, perennial herbaceous plants of the family Papaveraceae, including:
  - Lamprocapnos spectabilis (formerly Dicentra spectabilis), a popular garden plant with arching sprays of pendent red and white (or pure white) flowers
  - Dicentra, a genus native to eastern Asia and North America
  - Ehrendorferia, also known as eardrops
  - Dactylicapnos, herbaceous climbers
- Bleeding-heart, flowering shrubs, lianas, or small trees of the mint family Lamiaceae, in the genus Clerodendrum (also called glorybowers or bagflowers)
- Bleeding heart tree (Homalanthus populifolius), of the family Euphorbiaceae, an Australian rainforest plant, also known as Queensland poplar

== Music ==
- A Bleeding Heart, a 2003 EP by New Zealand band the Bleeders
- Bleeding Heart (album), a 1994 posthumous live album by Jimi Hendrix
- "Bleeding Heart" (song), a 1965 Elmore James song
- "Bleeding Heart", a song by Angra from the EP Hunters and Prey
- "Bleeding Heart", a song by Freedom Call from the album Eternity
- "Bleeding Heart", a song by Regina Spektor from the album Remember Us to Life
- The Bleeding Heart Band, the backing band for Roger Waters for a brief period of his post-Pink Floyd solo career

== Other uses ==
- Bleeding Heart (film), a 2015 American film
- Bleeding-hearts, doves in the genus Gallicolumba
- Bleeding heart tetra, Hyphessobrycon erythrostigma
- Bleeding Heart Yard, a courtyard in London, England
- Bleeding Hearts (Harvey novel), a 1994 crime novel by Ian Rankin, under the pseudonym Jack Harvey
- Bleeding Hearts (Cameron novel), a 2001 crime novel by Lindy Cameron
- "Bleeding Heart", an episode of season 2 of The Mentalist
- Bleeding Hearts (The Bill), an episode of The Bill

== See also ==
- Bleeding-heart libertarianism (or liberalism)
- Catholic iconography:
  - Sacred heart of Christ, often depicted bleeding
  - Heart of the virgin Mary, often depicted bleeding
- Heartbleed (disambiguation)
