= Staggerweed =

Staggerweed or stagger weed, a plant so named because it produces staggers in livestock that graze it, usually refers to Stachys arvensis.

It can also refer to other plants including:

- Consolida regalis syn. Delphinium consolida
- Corydalis cava
- Delphinium spp.
  - Delphinium tricorne
- Dicentra eximia syn. Fumaria eximia
- Dicentra canadensis
- Dicentra cucullaria
- Helenium autumnale
- Jacobaea vulgaris syn. Senecio jacobaea, also called staggerwort
