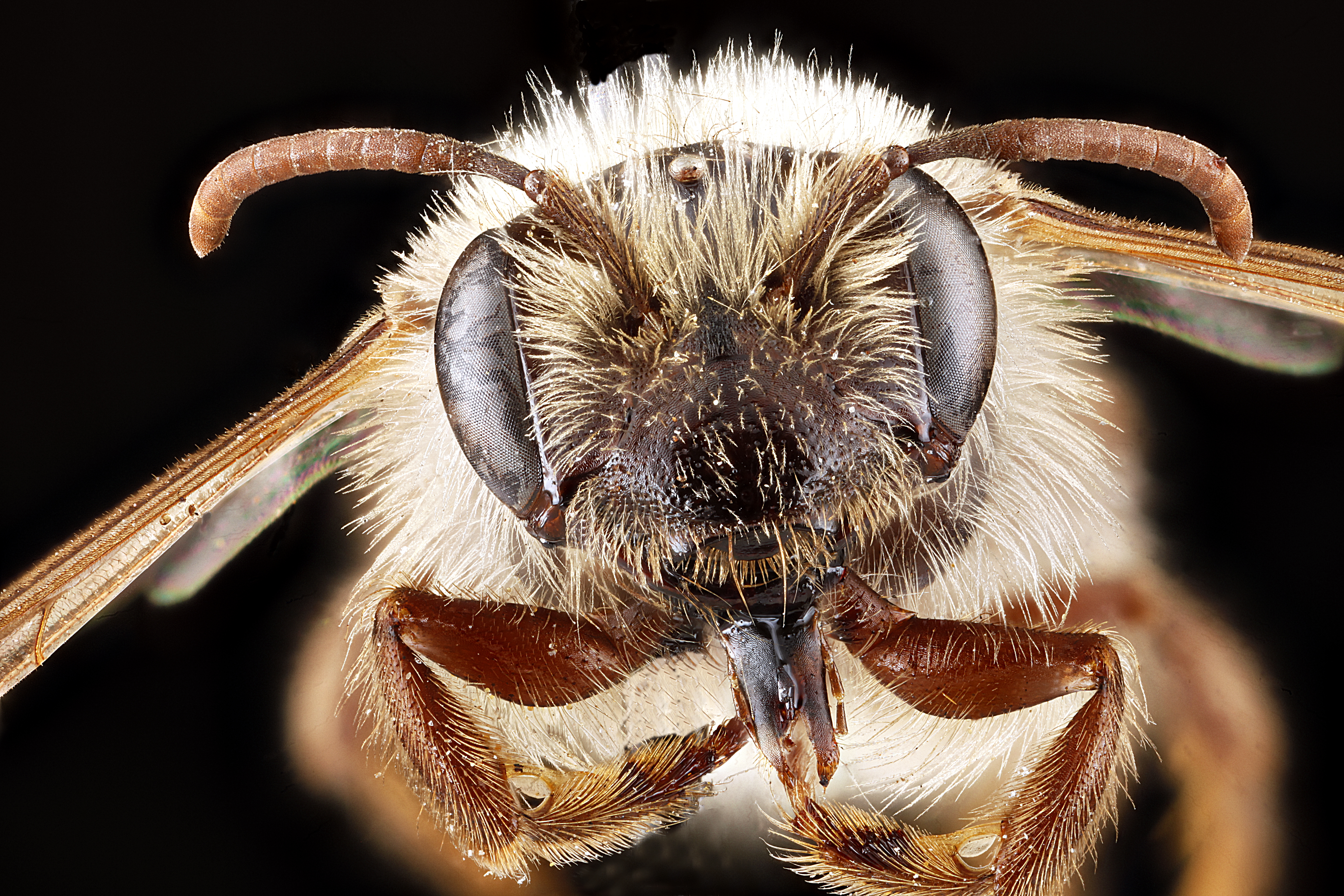
- Female

Scientific classification
- Domain: Eukaryota
- Kingdom: Animalia
- Phylum: Arthropoda
- Class: Insecta
- Order: Hymenoptera
- Family: Andrenidae
- Genus: Andrena
- Species: A. erythronii

Binomial name
- Andrena erythronii Robertson, 1891

= Andrena erythronii =

Species of bee

Andrena erythronii is a species of miner bee native to eastern North America. It is known as the trout lily miner bee and trout lily bee, for its association with trout lilies, flowers in the genus Erythronium. It has also been observed visiting the flowers of other spring ephemerals such as spring beauty (Claytonia), hepatica (Hepatica), and harbinger-of-spring (Erigenia bulbosa), as well as spring-flowering shrubs and trees: serviceberry (Amelanchier), plum and cherry (Prunus), and willow (Salix).

Female trout lily miner bees reach 11–14 mm in length while males are a little smaller: 9–11 mm.

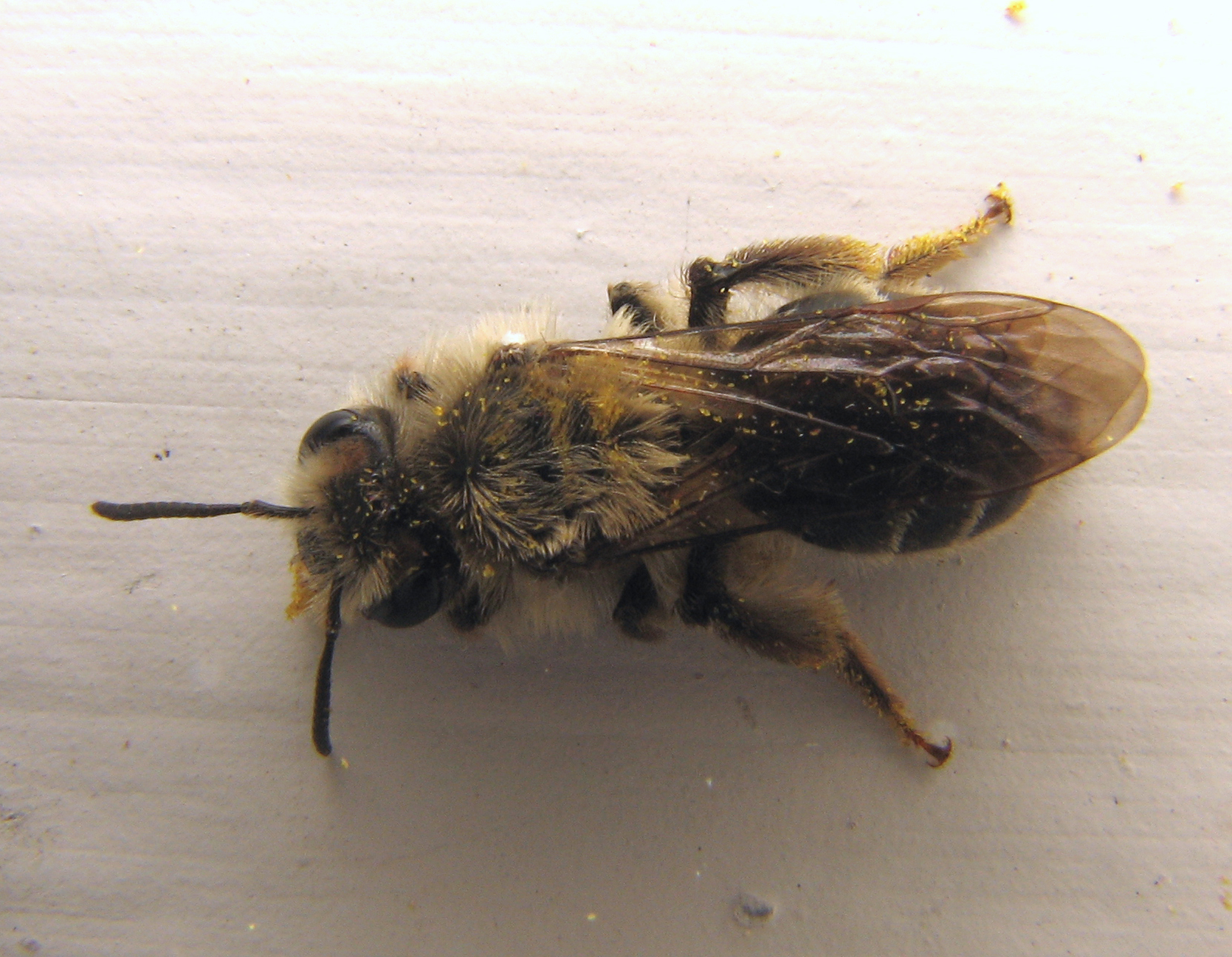
Female in Bucks County, Pennsylvania
