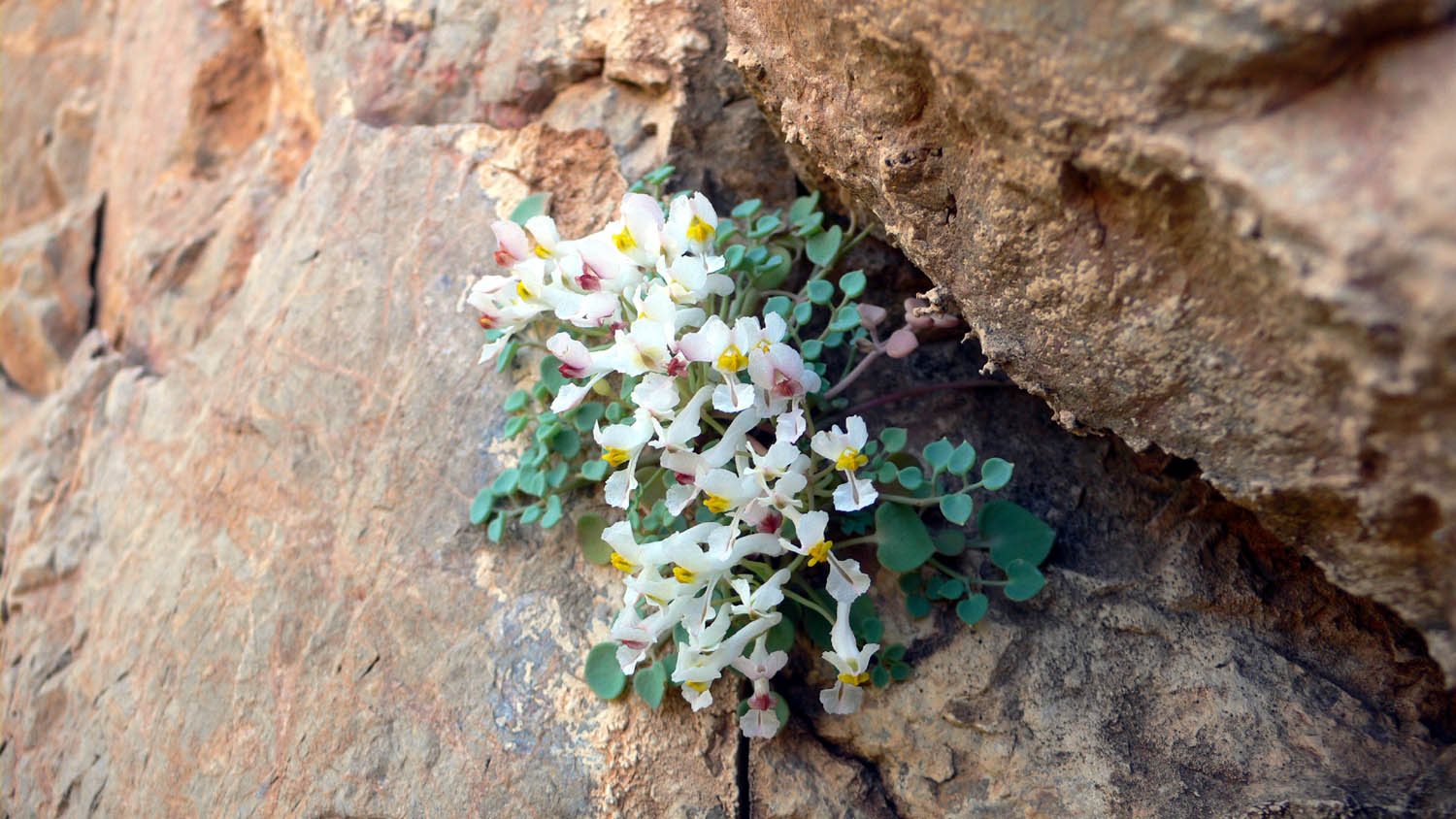
- Sarcocapnos enneaphylla

Scientific classification
- Kingdom: Plantae
- Clade: Embryophytes
- Clade: Tracheophytes
- Clade: Spermatophytes
- Clade: Angiosperms
- Clade: Eudicots
- Order: Ranunculales
- Family: Papaveraceae
- Subfamily: Fumarioideae
- Tribe: Fumarieae
- Subtribe: Fumariinae
- Genus: Sarcocapnos; DC.

Species
- See text

= Sarcocapnos =

Genus of flowering plants

Sarcocapnos (from Ancient Greek σάρξ (sárx), meaning "flesh", and καπνός (kapnós), meaning "smoke") is a genus of at least 6 species of somewhat fleshy, cushion-forming annual to perennial plants, native to cliffs in the French Pyrenees, Spain, and north Africa.

== Description ==
As in the genus Corydalis (but unlike Dicentra), the flowers are zygomorphic, that is, they have bilateral symmetry.

== Species ==
There are at least 6 species:

- Sarcocapnos baetica (Boiss. & Reut.) Nyman
- Sarcocapnos crassifolia (Desf.) DC.
- Sarcocapnos enneaphylla (L.) DC.
- Sarcocapnos integrifolia (Boiss.) Cuatrec.
- Sarcocapnos pulcherrima C. Morales & Romero García
- Sarcocapnos saetabensis Mateo & Figuerola
