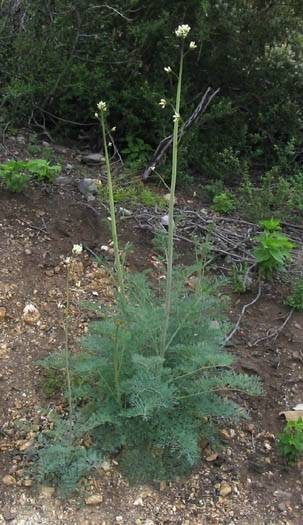

Scientific classification
- Kingdom: Plantae
- Clade: Tracheophytes
- Clade: Angiosperms
- Clade: Eudicots
- Order: Ranunculales
- Family: Papaveraceae
- Genus: Ehrendorferia
- Species: E. ochroleuca

Binomial name
- Ehrendorferia ochroleuca (Engelm.) Fukuhara

Synonyms
- Dicentra ochroleuca Engelm.

= Ehrendorferia ochroleuca =

Species of flowering plant

Ehrendorferia ochroleuca (formerly Dicentra ochroleuca), commonly known as white eardrops or yellow bleeding-heart, is a biennial or perennial, native to gravelly areas in the chaparral and woodlands of California (Peninsular, Transverse, and southern Coast Ranges) and in Baja California.

== Description ==
Stems and leaves are glaucous. Stems grow 1–2 m (3.3–6.6 ft) tall; the record is 4 m (13 ft), the tallest of any species in the Fumarioideae. Leaves are pinnately divided 2–4 times. They grow in a basal rosette the first year and later also on flowering stems.

Flowers are up-facing, in round clusters at the end of the stems. They have 2 round sepals and 4 dull white petals with purple tips. The 2 outer petals are pouched at the base and curved outwards at the tip. The 2 inner petals are connected at the tip and project out from between the outer petals. The flowers have no odor, unlike the closely related species Ehrendorferia chrysantha. Hummingbirds visit the flowers for nectar.

Seeds are tiny and bumpy, in a rounded pod 1–3 cm (0.39–1.18 in) long, tapering to a point at both ends. They lack the elaiosomes present in many other members of the family. They do not easily germinate without being exposed to smoke. In cultivation, a liquid smoke extract is often used.
