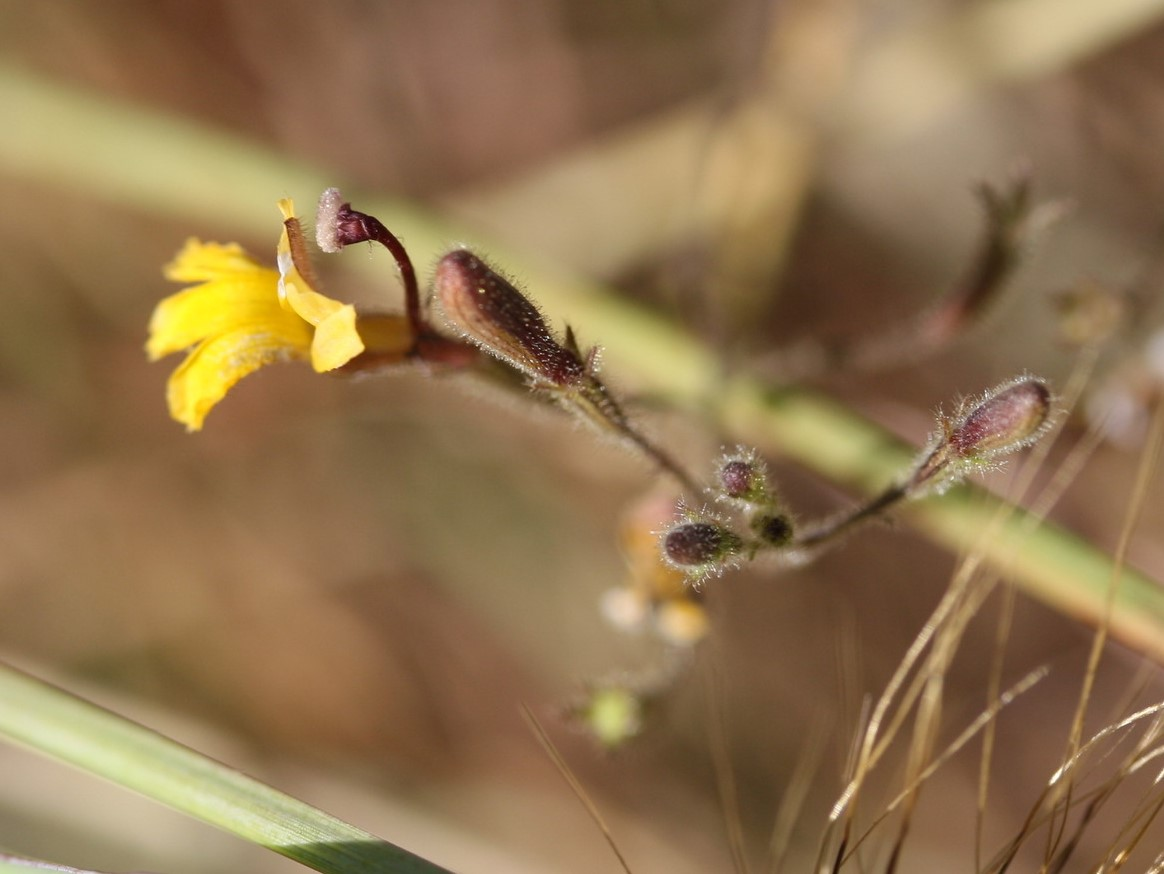

Scientific classification
- Kingdom: Plantae
- Clade: Tracheophytes
- Clade: Angiosperms
- Clade: Eudicots
- Clade: Asterids
- Order: Asterales
- Family: Goodeniaceae
- Genus: Goodenia
- Species: G. bicolor

Binomial name
- Goodenia bicolor F.Muell. ex Benth.

Synonyms
- Goodenia propinqua W.Fitzg.

= Goodenia bicolor =

Species of plant

Goodenia bicolor is a species of flowering plant in the family Goodeniaceae and is endemic to north-western Australia. It is an annual or ephemeral herb with lance-shaped to egg-shaped leaves with the narrower end towards the base, racemes of yellow or yellow and purple flowers and elliptical fruit.

== Description ==
Goodenia bicolor is an annual or ephemeral herb that typically grows to a height of 40 mm (1.6 in) and has foliage with soft hairs. The leaves are lance-shaped to egg-shaped with the narrower end towards the base and irregular teeth on the edges, up to 20–50 mm (0.79–1.97 in) long and 6–20 mm (0.24–0.79 in) wide. The flowers are arranged in racemes up to 300 mm (12 in) long on a peduncle 2–5 mm (0.079–0.197 in) long with narrow elliptic bracteoles 2 mm (0.079 in) long at the base, each flower on a pedicel 2 mm (0.079 in) long. The sepals are narrow egg-shaped, 1.5 mm (0.059 in) long and the corolla is yellow or yellow and purple, 5–8 mm (0.20–0.31 in) long, the lower lobes of the corolla about 3 mm (0.12 in) long with wings about 0.8 mm (0.031 in) wide. Flowering occurs from March to June and the fruit is an elliptic capsule 3–4 mm (0.12–0.16 in) long.

== Taxonomy and naming ==
Goodenia bicolor was first formally described in 1859 by George Bentham in Flora Australiensis from an unpublished description by Ferdinand von Mueller. The specific epithet (bicolor) means "two-coloured".

== Distribution and habitat ==
This goodenia grows in seasonally damp areas in northern Western Australia and the north-west of the Northern Territory.

== Conservation status ==
Goodenia bicolor is classified as "not threatened" by the Western Australian Government Department of Parks and Wildlife, and as of "least concern" under the Northern Territory Government Territory Parks and Wildlife Conservation Act 1976.
