= Ephemeral plant =

Plant with a short life cycle

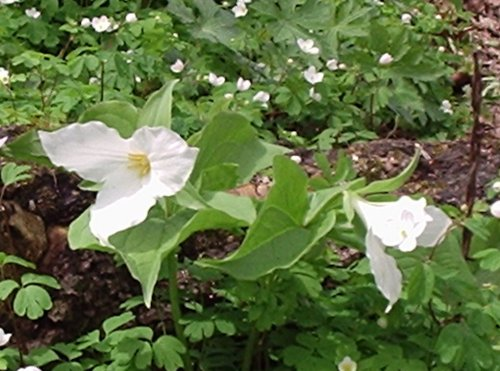
Trillium grandiflorum in the foreground and the smaller Thalictrum thalictroides in the background are both spring ephemerals of North American deciduous forests

An ephemeral plant is a plant with a very short life cycle or very short period of active growth, often one that grows only during brief periods when conditions are favorable. Several types of ephemeral plants exist. The first, spring ephemeral, refers to plants that emerge quickly in the spring and die back to their underground parts after a short growth and reproduction phase. Desert ephemerals are plants which are adapted to take advantage of the short wet periods in arid climates. Mud-flat ephemerals take advantage of short periods of low water. In areas subjected to recurring human disturbance, such as plowing, weedy ephemerals are very short-lived plants whose entire life cycle takes less than a growing season. In each case, the species has a life cycle timed to exploit a short period when resources are freely available. An evergreen plant could be considered the opposite of an ephemeral plant.

== Spring ephemerals ==
Spring ephemerals are woodland wildflowers which develop aerial parts (i.e. stems, leaves, and flowers) of the plant early each spring and then quickly bloom, and produce seed. The leaves often wither leaving only underground structures (i.e. roots, rhizomes, and bulbs) for the remainder of the year. This strategy is very common in herbaceous communities of deciduous forests as it allows small herbaceous plants to take advantage of the high levels of sunlight reaching the forest floor prior to the formation of a canopy by woody plants. Examples include spring beauties, trilliums, harbinger of spring, Dutchman's breeches, and squirrel corn.

In the herb layer of beech forest and hornbeam-sessile oak forest, tuberous, bulbous and rhizomous plants are abundant. They comprise the spring geophytes (tuberous, bulbous and rhizomous).

== Desert ephemerals ==
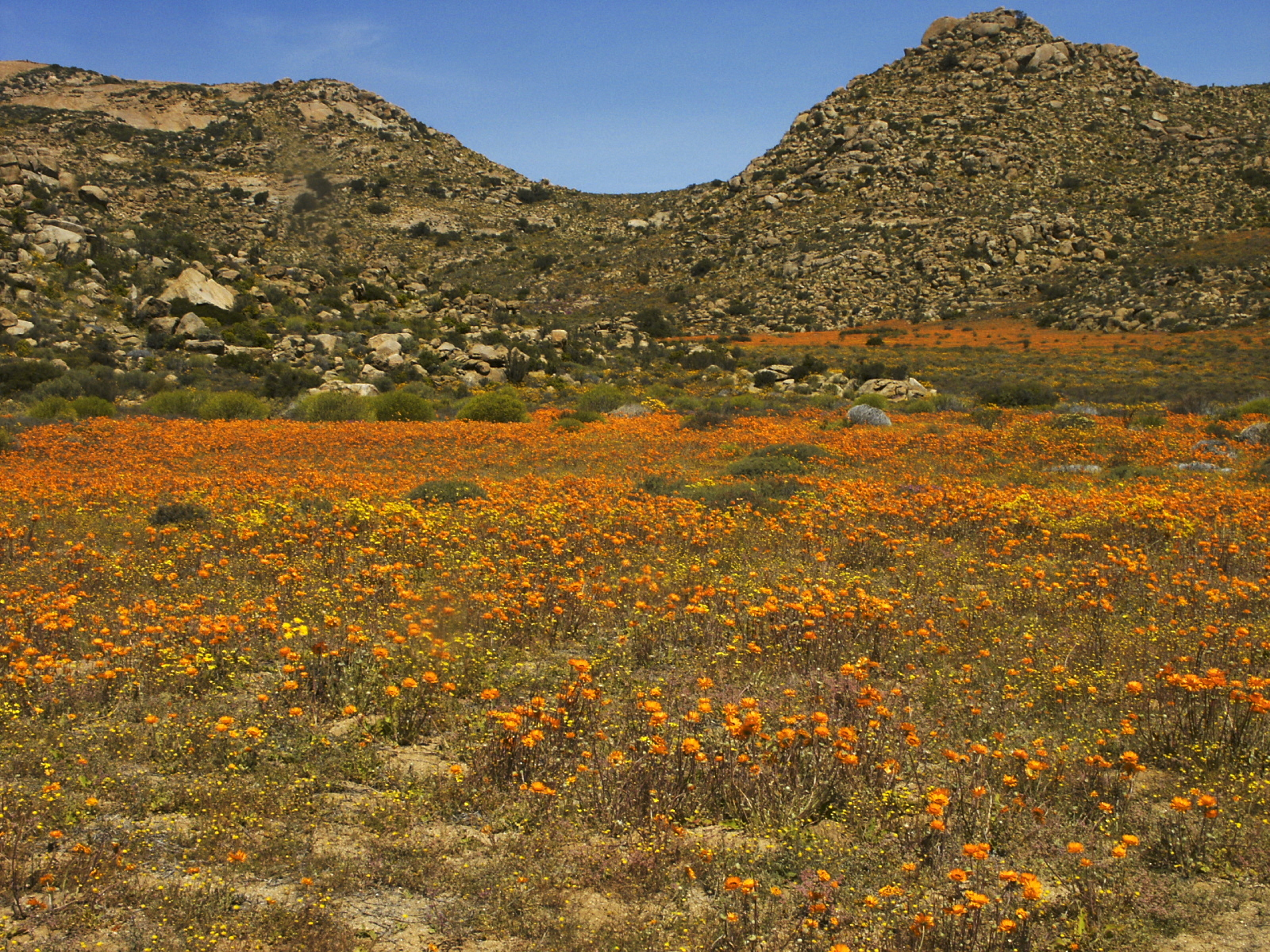
This normally bare desert in Namaqualand, Goegap Nature Reserve in South Africa has a proliferation of flowers and desert ephemerals during the brief spring wet season

Desert ephemerals, such as Arabidopsis thaliana, are plants which are adapted to take advantage of the very short favourable seasons in deserts. Annual plants in deserts may use the weedy ephemeral strategy to survive in the desert environment. These species survive the dry seasons through seed dormancy. Alternatively, some perennial desert plants may die back to their underground parts and become dormant when there is not enough water available.

== Mud flat ephemerals ==
Most water bodies have natural changes in water level over a year. For example, rivers have higher water periods after melting snow or rainy seasons, followed by natural low water periods. Large lakes have similar seasonal changes, but also changes over longer periods of time. Many short-lived plants, particularly annual plants, grow during low water periods, then set seeds which remain buried in the mud until the next low water period.

== Weedy ephemerals ==
Many agricultural weeds are ephemeral and reproduce rapidly after human disturbance from plowing. Roadside weeds similarly exploit the disturbance from road construction and mowing. These plants rarely have any commercial use and can be invasive weeds. Examples include: Cardamine hirsuta and Cannabis ruderalis. Plants which have short life spans, rapid rates of growth, and high levels of seed production are also termed ruderals.

== See also ==
- Weed
- Annual plant
- Superbloom
