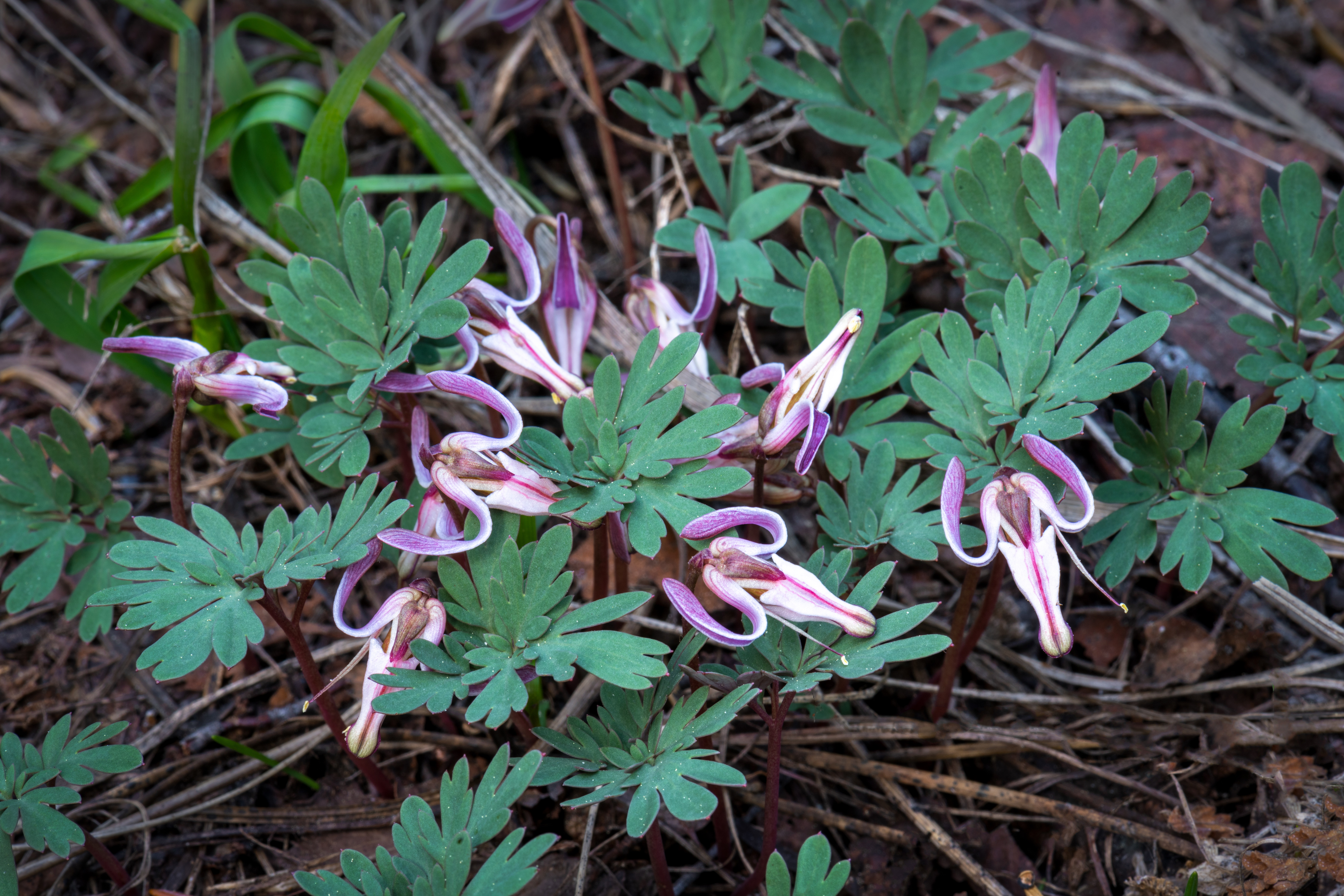

Scientific classification
- Kingdom: Plantae
- Clade: Embryophytes
- Clade: Tracheophytes
- Clade: Spermatophytes
- Clade: Angiosperms
- Clade: Eudicots
- Order: Ranunculales
- Family: Papaveraceae
- Genus: Dicentra
- Species: D. uniflora

Binomial name
- Dicentra uniflora Kellogg

= Dicentra uniflora =

Species of flowering plant in the poppy family

Dicentra uniflora, the longhorn steer's head, is a herbaceous perennial flowering plant growing from a tuber, native to gravelly soils in mountains of the western United States and Canada.

== Description ==
Height is up to 10 centimetres (4 in). Leaves are long-stalked and 3-times compound with rounded leaflets. Each leaflet is deeply divided.

Flowers have pink to white petals tinged with light brown or purple. The two outer petals are bent back; the inner petals are fused at the tip. Flowers bloom February to June. Its habitats include open woods and foothills, as well as gravelly mid-elevation mountaintops.

Seeds are borne in a capsule a little more than a 1 centimetre (0.4 in) long.

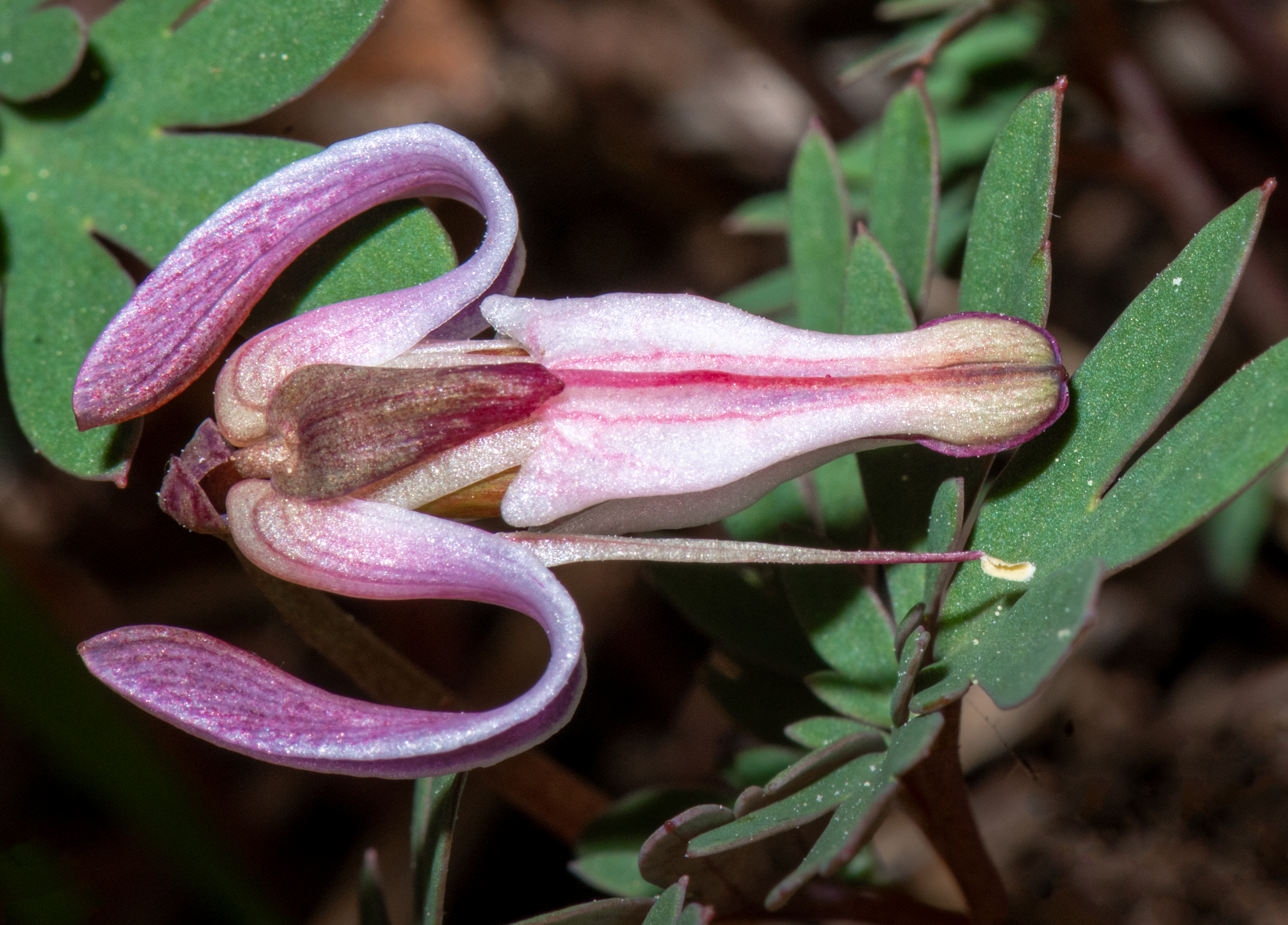
Dicentra uniflora
