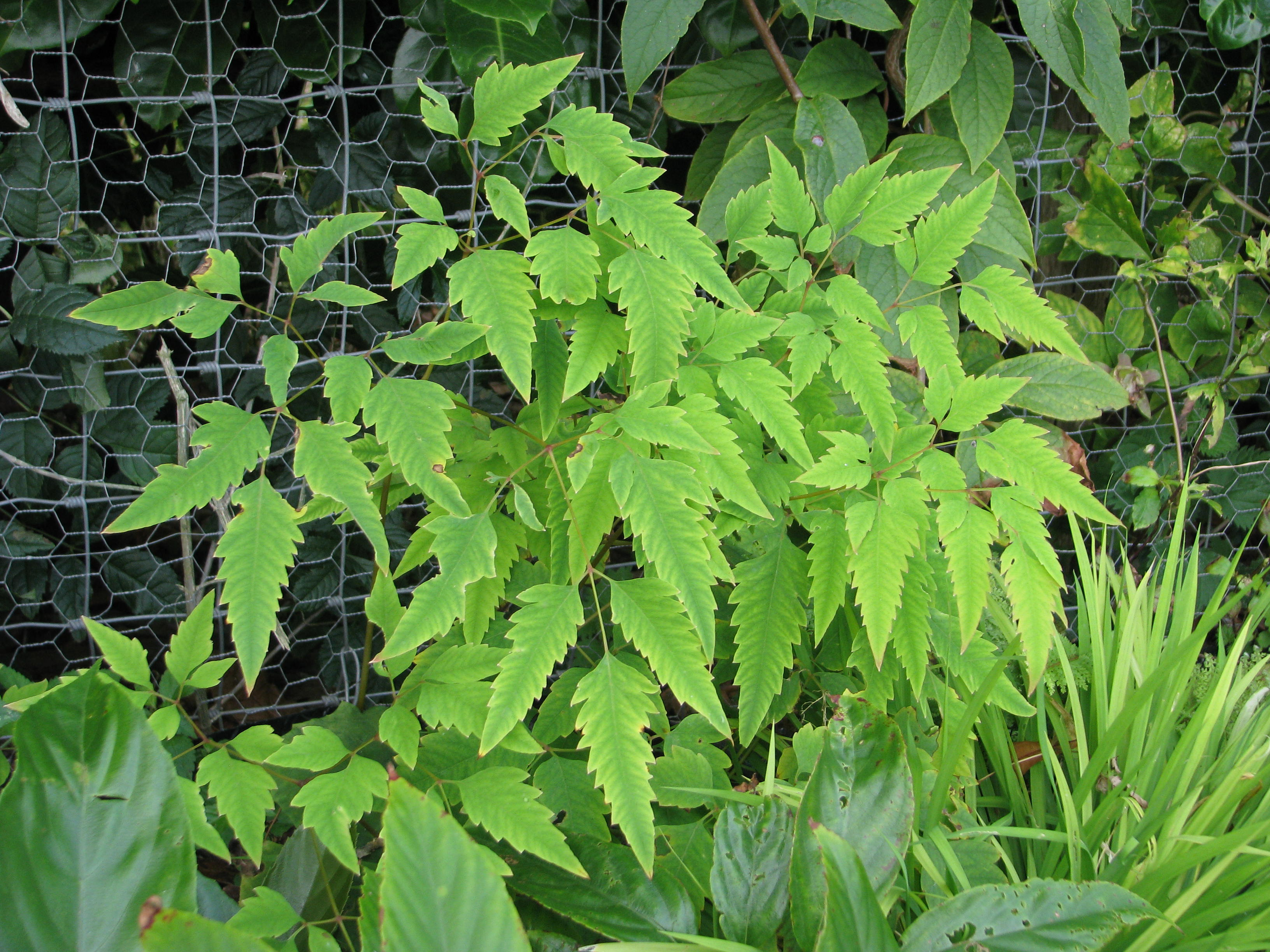
- Ichthyoselmis macrantha

Scientific classification
- Kingdom: Plantae
- Clade: Tracheophytes
- Clade: Angiosperms
- Clade: Eudicots
- Order: Ranunculales
- Family: Papaveraceae
- Subfamily: Fumarioideae
- Tribe: Fumarieae
- Subtribe: Corydalinae
- Genus: Ichtyoselmis; Lidén & T.Fukuhara
- Species: I. macrantha

Binomial name
- Ichtyoselmis macrantha (Oliv.) Lidén

Synonyms
- Dicentra macrantha Oliv.

= Ichtyoselmis =

Genus of flowering of plants in the poppy family

Ichtyoselmis macrantha (also spelled Ichthyoselmis; formerly known as Dicentra macrantha; large-flowered dicentra) is the only species in the genus Ichtyoselmis. It is a perennial plant growing from a long rhizome, native to woodland and glades at elevations of 1,500–2,700 metres (4,900–8,900 ft) in northern Burma and southern China.

In Sichuan Province, China, it is known as goldfish plant, because of the shape and color of the flowers.

== Etymology ==
Ichtyoselmis comes from Greek ἰχθύς (ichthŷs, "fish") and selmís ("fishing line"). Although the correct spelling of the Greek word uses th (theta), the scientific name uses t.

== Description ==
Leaves are divided in threes twice or three times and toothed.

Flowers hang at the end of leafy stems up to 1 m (3.3 ft) tall in cymes of 3-14 flowers and have two long, thin sepals and four cream to pale yellow petals. The two outer petals are bent outwards. The two inner petals are connected at the tip and pointed.
