= Heartbleed (disambiguation) =

Heartbleed is a security bug in the open-source OpenSSL cryptography library.

Heartbleed may also refer to:

- "Heartbleed", a song by Tamra Keenan

== See also ==
- Bleeding heart (disambiguation)
- "Hearts That Bleed", a song by State of Shock
- "My Heart Bleeds the Darkest Blood", a song by Shai Hulud
