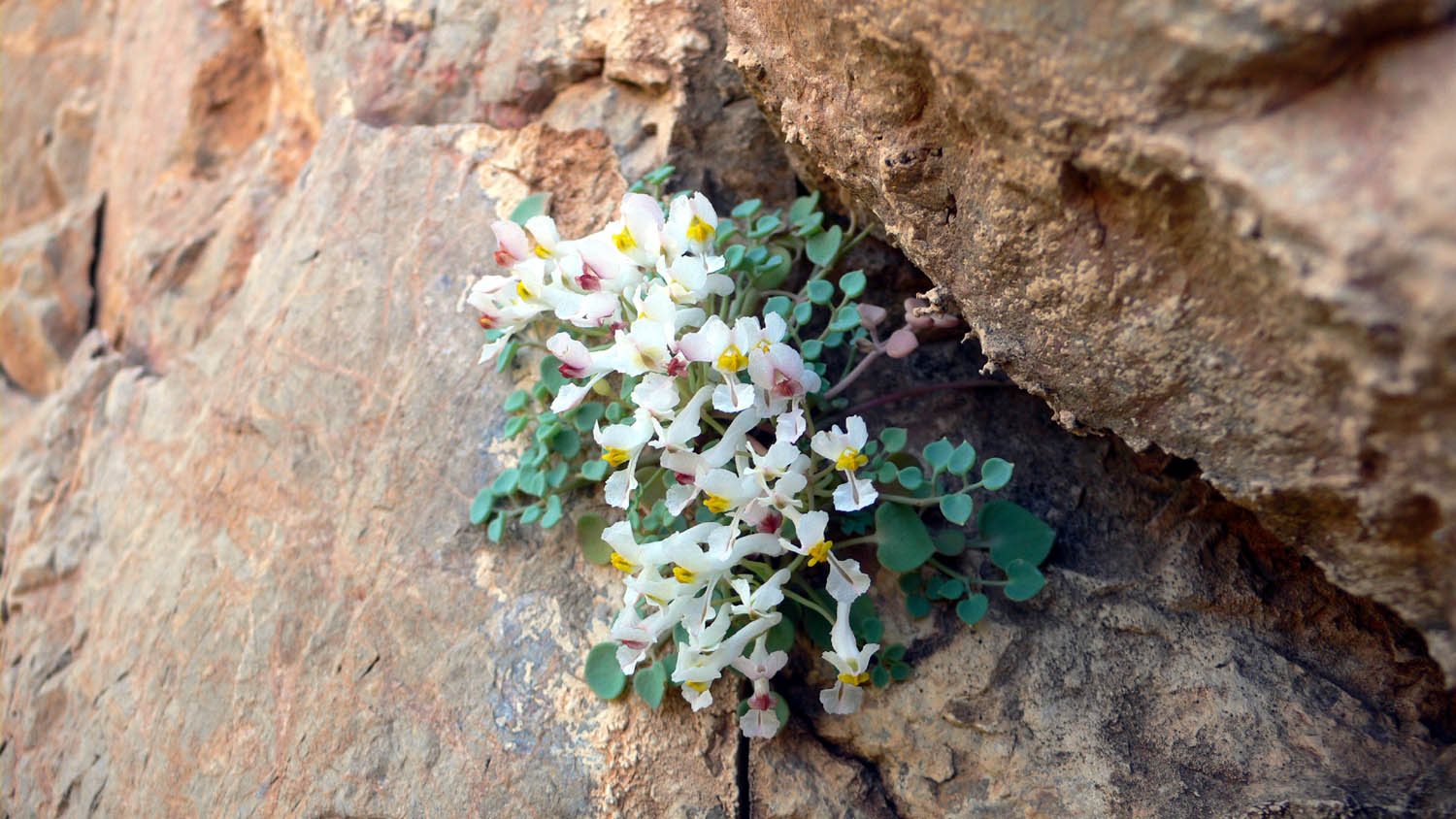

Scientific classification
- Kingdom: Plantae
- Clade: Embryophytes
- Clade: Tracheophytes
- Clade: Spermatophytes
- Clade: Angiosperms
- Clade: Eudicots
- Order: Ranunculales
- Family: Papaveraceae
- Genus: Sarcocapnos
- Species: S. enneaphylla

Binomial name
- Sarcocapnos enneaphylla (L.) DC.

= Sarcocapnos enneaphylla =

Species of flowering plant

Sarcocapnos enneaphylla, the nine-leaved sarcocapnos, is a species of flowering plant in the family Papaveraceae. It is native to southwestern Europe and northern Africa. It grows in rocks and crevices of escarpments, usually in limestone cliffs.

== Description ==
Sarcocapnos enneaphylla is a more or less creeping perennial plant. It has a woody base and flexible caespitose stems. The leaves are long-stalked and compound, with rounded oval segments - almost heart-shaped - with a pointed apex. Its flowers are white or yellowish, and purple at the end. The outer petals are much longer and divided into two lobes. The upper petal is provided with a short spur inflated at the apex. The ovaries have two ovules. The fruit is elongated and compressed. The plant flowers from winter to summer.
