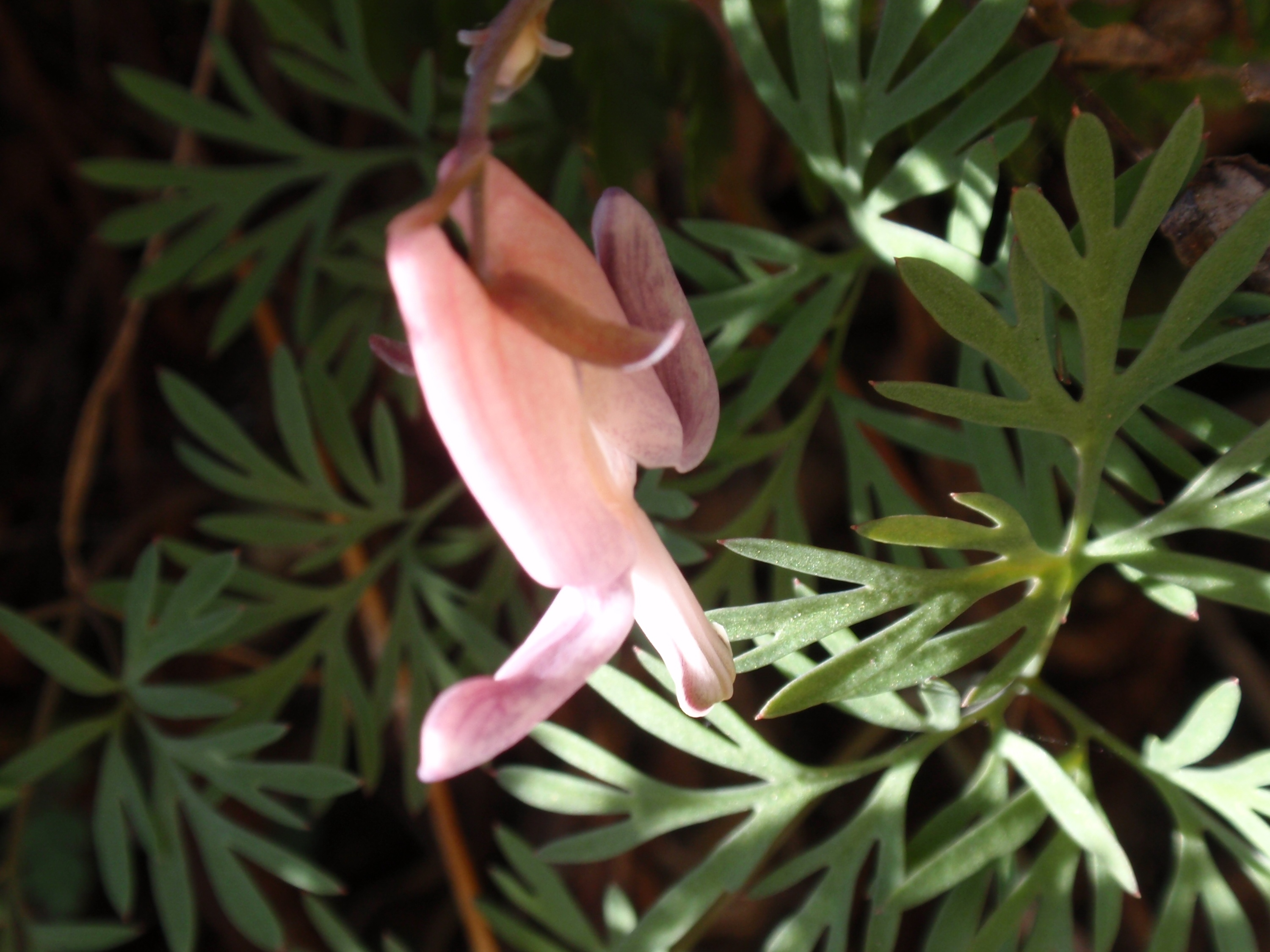

Scientific classification
- Kingdom: Plantae
- Clade: Tracheophytes
- Clade: Angiosperms
- Clade: Eudicots
- Order: Ranunculales
- Family: Papaveraceae
- Genus: Dicentra
- Species: D. pauciflora

Binomial name
- Dicentra pauciflora S.Wats.

= Dicentra pauciflora =

Species of flowering plant in the poppy family

Dicentra pauciflora is a species of flowering plant in Dicentra, the genus containing the bleeding-hearts. Its common names include shorthorn steer's head and few-flowered bleeding-heart. This perennial wildflower is native to the US states of Oregon and California, where it grows high in the mountains in gravelly soils. This is a short bleeding-heart, approaching 10 centimeters (3.9 in) in maximum height. From a rhizome beneath the soil it extends several erect petioles, each holding a leaf divided into leaflets which are each divided into smooth, fingerlike lobes. It also erects a thin stem which is topped with an inflorescence of one to three nodding flowers. Each flower is a shade of pink or purple to white, with two curving outer petals flexed back against the flower, and inner petals extended straight outward. The fruit is a capsule just over a centimeter long. The specific epithet, pauciflora, refers to the Latin term for 'few flowered'.
