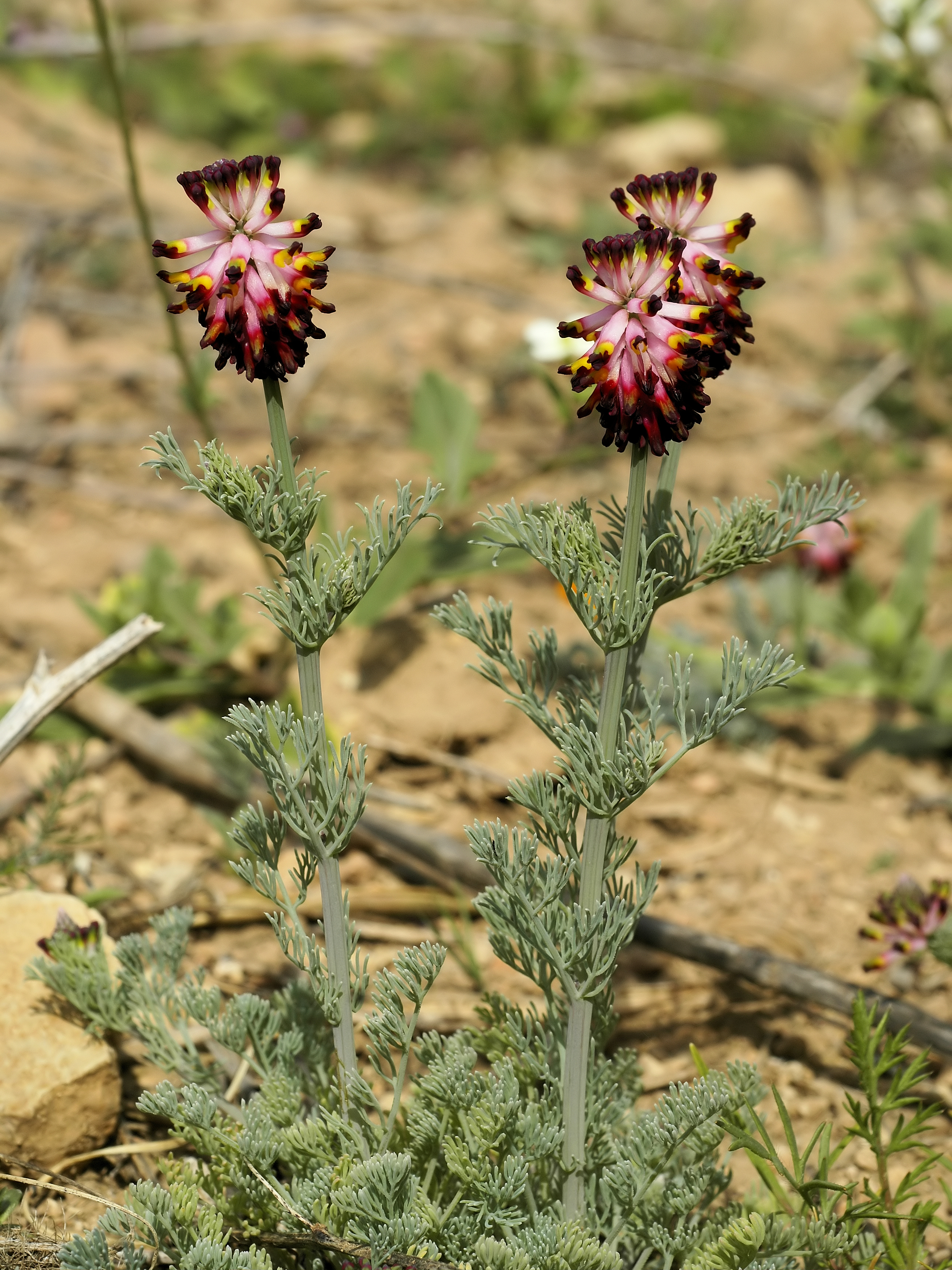
- Platycapnos tenuiloba

Scientific classification
- Kingdom: Plantae
- Clade: Tracheophytes
- Clade: Angiosperms
- Clade: Eudicots
- Order: Ranunculales
- Family: Papaveraceae
- Genus: Platycapnos (DC.) Bernh.

= Platycapnos =

Genus of plants

Platycapnos is a genus of flowering plants belonging to the family Papaveraceae.

Its native range is Canary Islands, Western and Central Mediterranean.

Species:

- Platycapnos saxicola Willk.
- Platycapnos spicatus (L.) Bernh.
- Platycapnos tenuilobus Pomel
