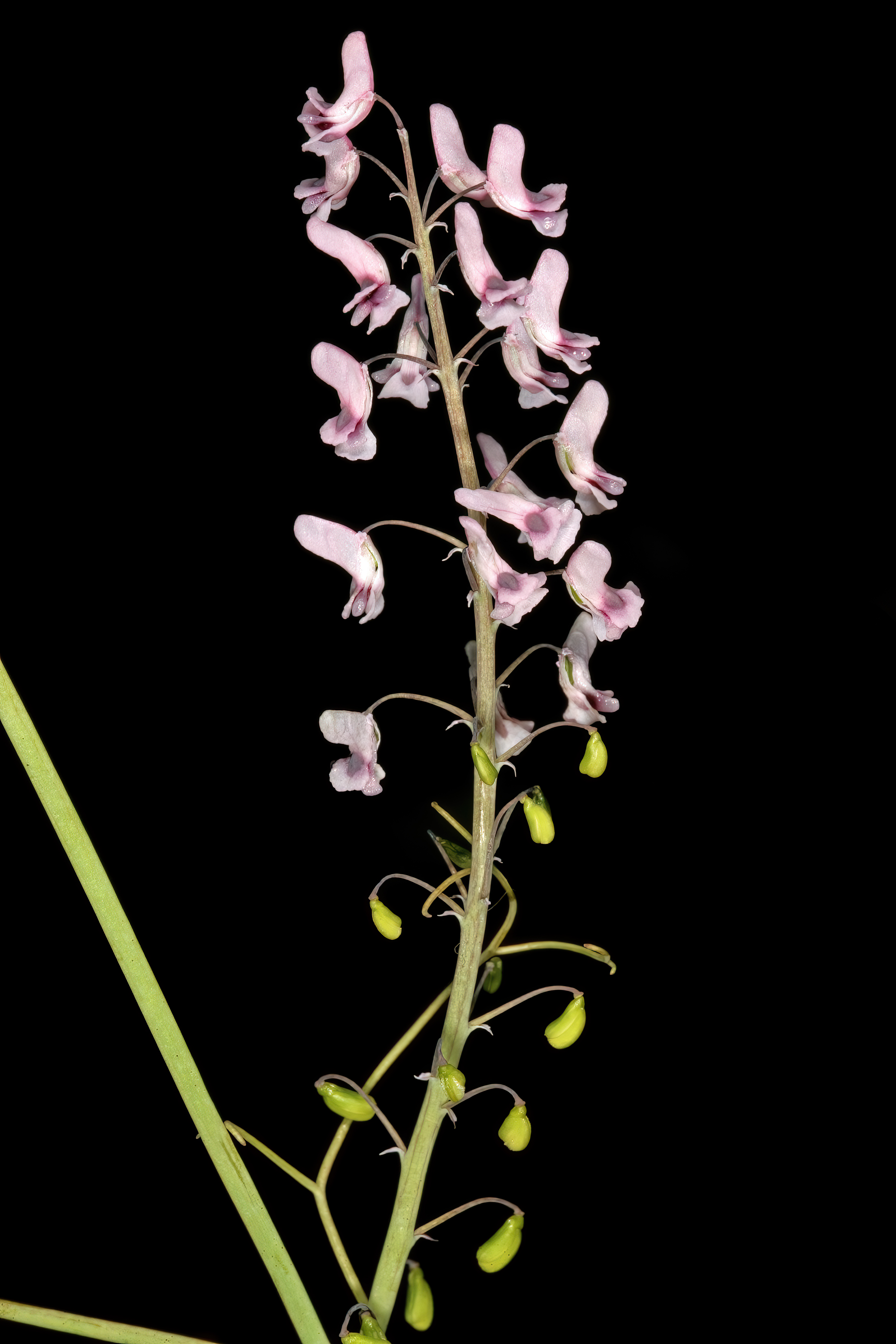
- Trigonocapnos lichtensteinii

Scientific classification
- Kingdom: Plantae
- Clade: Tracheophytes
- Clade: Angiosperms
- Clade: Eudicots
- Order: Ranunculales
- Family: Papaveraceae
- Genus: Trigonocapnos; Schltr.

= Trigonocapnos =

Genus of flowering plants

Trigonocapnos is a monotypic genus of flowering plants belonging to the family Papaveraceae. The only species is Trigonocapnos lichtensteinii (Cham. & Schltdl.) Lidén. It is endemic to South Africa.
