= Magnus Lidén =

Swedish botanist

Magnus Lidén (born 1951) is a Swedish systematic botanist.

Lidén received a PhD in systematic botany from University of Gothenburg in 1986, where he stayed until 1997. He was the director of the Uppsala Botanic Gardens from 1998 – 2003. Since 2004, he has been a researcher at the department of Systematic Biology at the Evolutionary Biology Center of Uppsala University.

Lidén is best known for his studies on the plant family Fumariaceae (the bleeding heart family), and the genus Dionysia (cushion primroses). His research has taken him to the Mediterranean, Central Asia, Iran, and the Sino-Himalayan area (southwest China and northeast India).

Lidén has also worked on species concepts, evolutionary ontology, and biological nomenclature.

The standard author abbreviation Lidén is used to indicate this person as the author when citing a botanical name.
