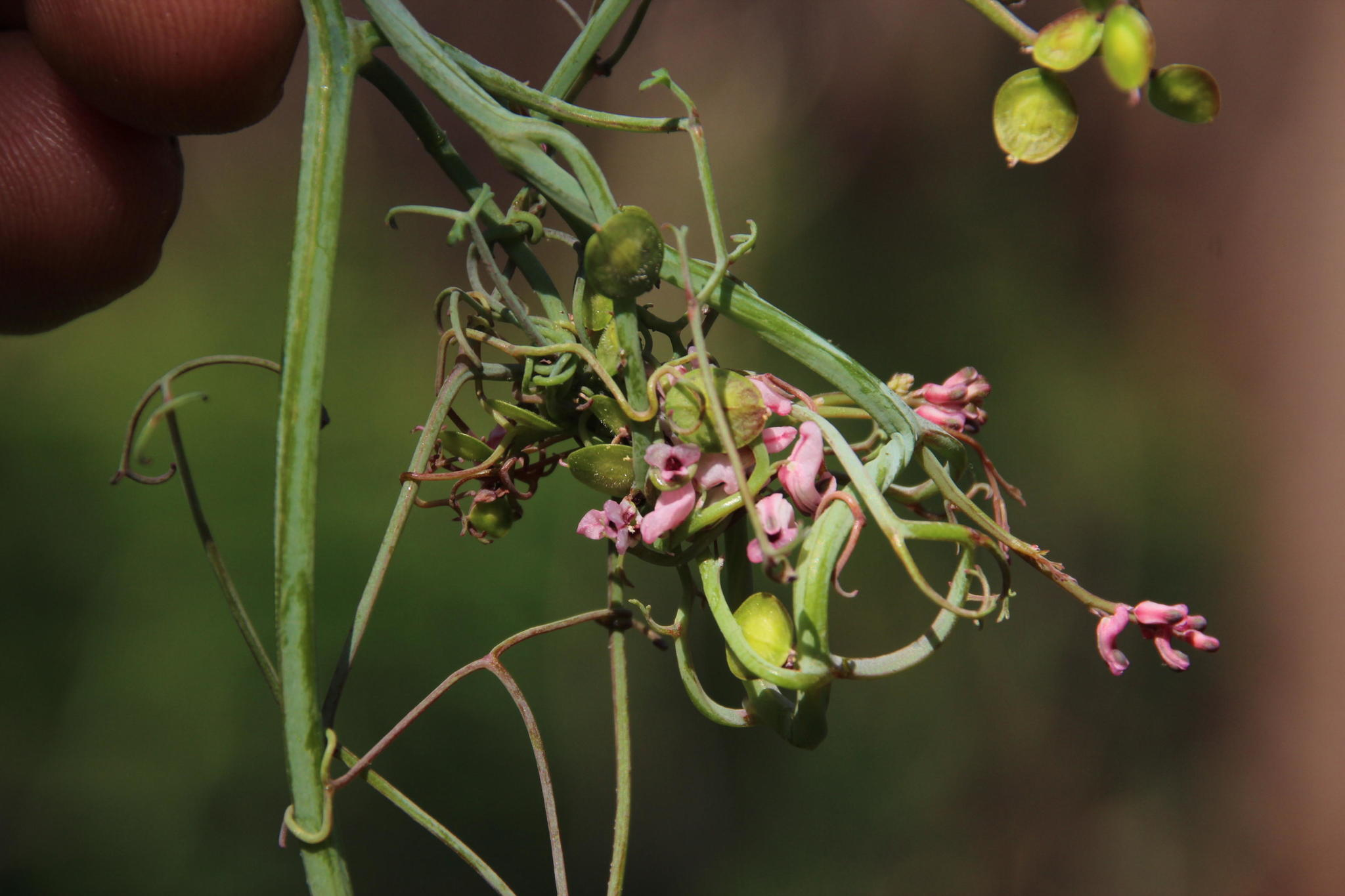
- Discocapnos mundtii ssp. mundtii

Scientific classification
- Kingdom: Plantae
- Clade: Tracheophytes
- Clade: Angiosperms
- Clade: Eudicots
- Order: Ranunculales
- Family: Papaveraceae
- Genus: Discocapnos; Cham. & Schltdl.

= Discocapnos =

Genus of plants

Discocapnos is a monotypic genus of flowering plants belonging to the family Papaveraceae. The only species in the genus is Discocapnos mundii Cham. & Schltdl. It is endemic to the Cape Provinces in South Africa.
