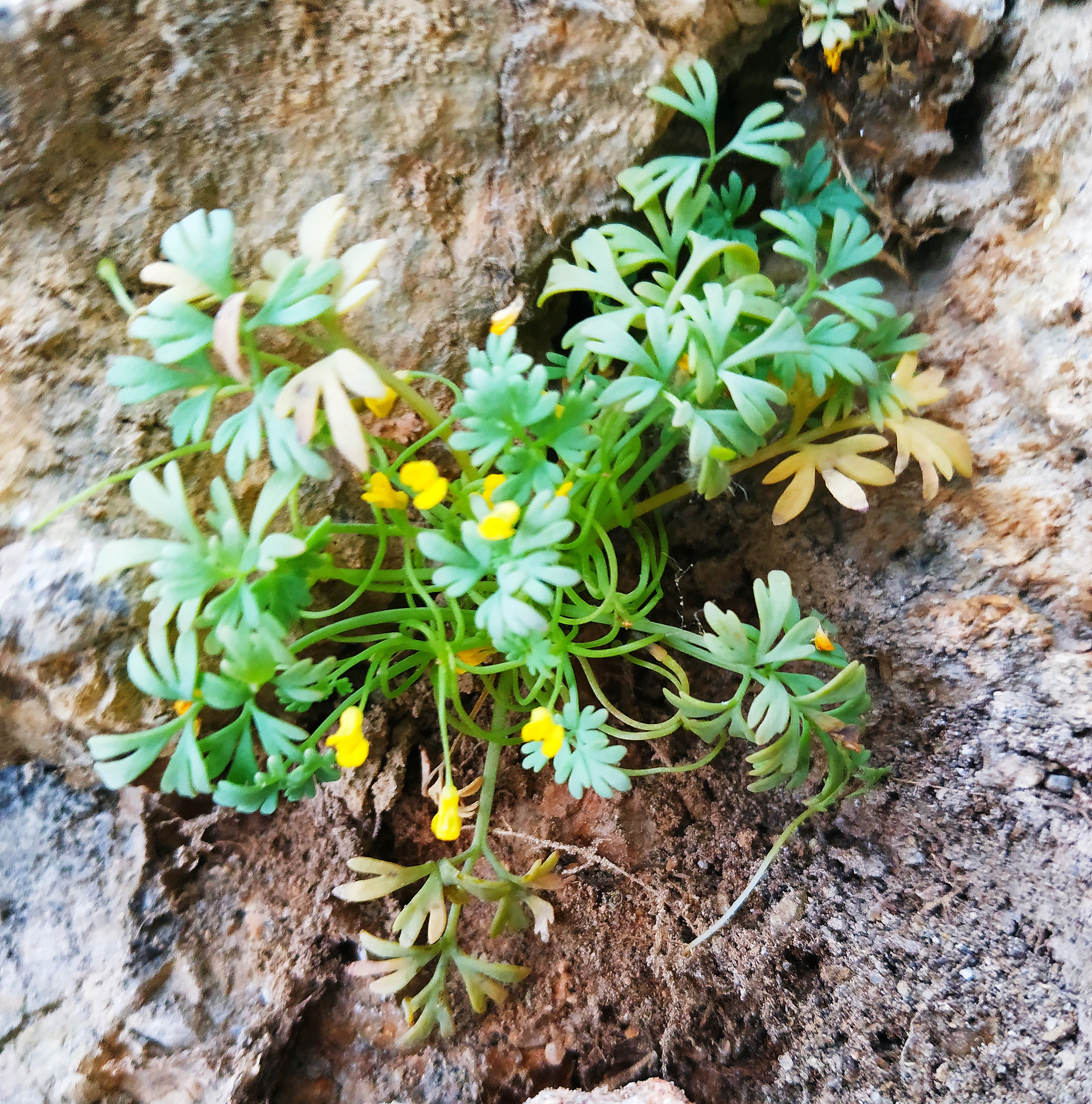
- Fumariola turkestanica

Scientific classification
- Kingdom: Plantae
- Clade: Tracheophytes
- Clade: Angiosperms
- Clade: Eudicots
- Order: Ranunculales
- Family: Papaveraceae
- Genus: Fumariola; Korsh.
- Species: F. turkestanica

Binomial name
- Fumariola turkestanica Korsh.

= Fumariola =

Genus of flowering plants

Fumariola is a monotypic genus of flowering plants belonging to the family Papaveraceae. The single species in the genus is Fumariola turkestanica Korsh. Its native range is Central Asia (Kirgizstan, Tadzhikistan and Uzbekistan).
