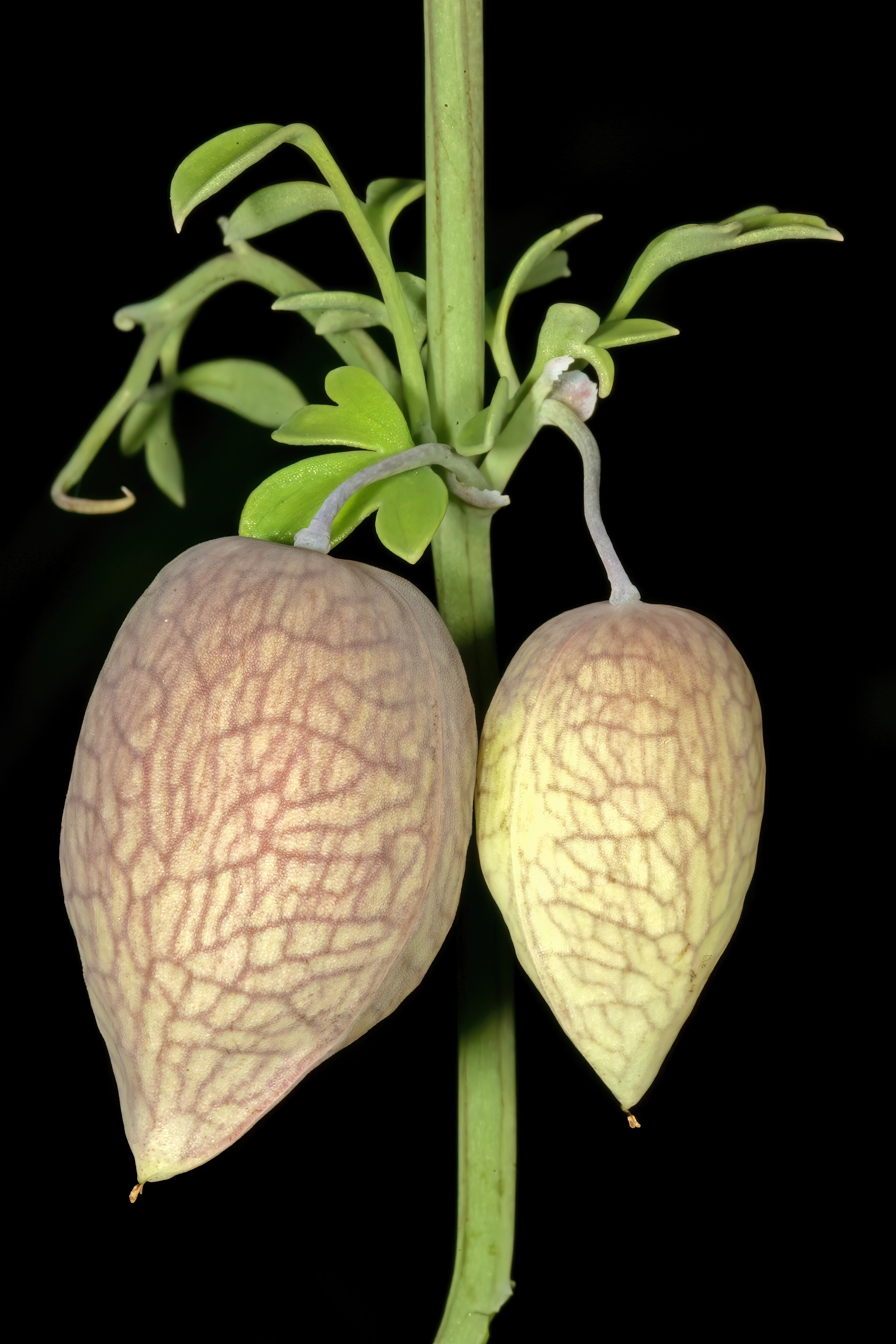
- Cysticapnos vesicaria developing fruit

Scientific classification
- Kingdom: Plantae
- Clade: Tracheophytes
- Clade: Angiosperms
- Clade: Eudicots
- Order: Ranunculales
- Family: Papaveraceae
- Genus: Cysticapnos; Mill.

= Cysticapnos =

Genus of flowering plants

Cysticapnos is a genus of flowering plants belonging to the family Papaveraceae.

Its native range is Southern Africa.

Species:

- Cysticapnos cracca (Cham. & Schltdl.) Lidén
- Cysticapnos pruinosa (E.Mey. ex Bernh.) Lidén
- Cysticapnos vesicaria (L.) Fedde
