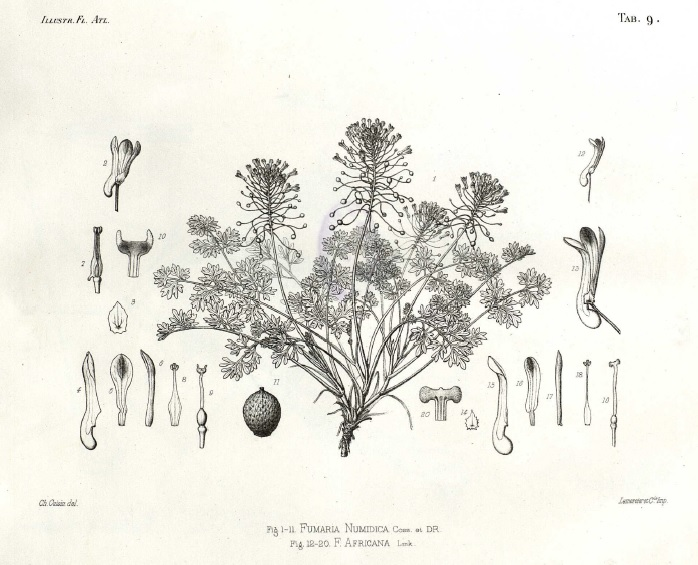
- Fumaria numidica
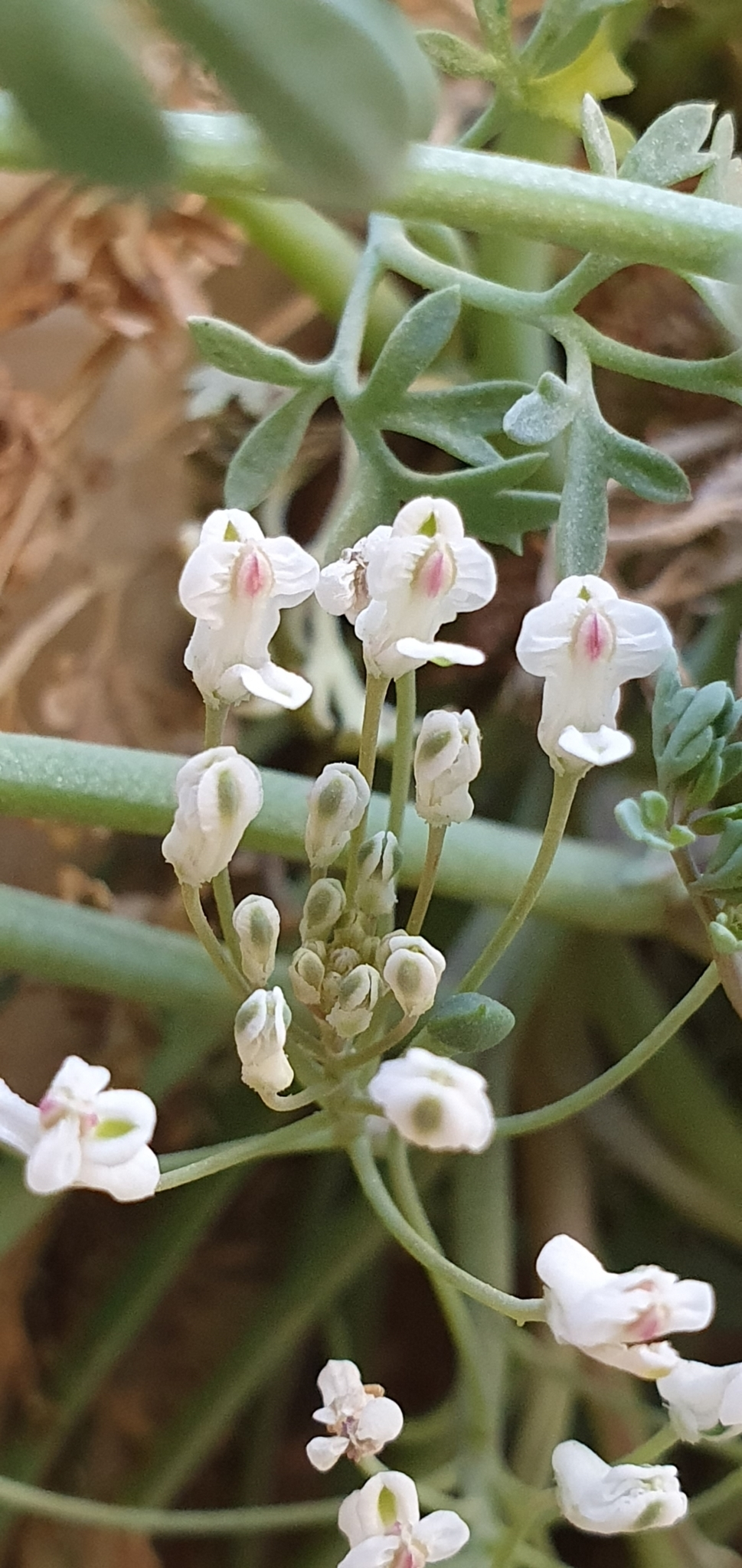
- Rupicapnos numidica

Scientific classification
- Kingdom: Plantae
- Clade: Tracheophytes
- Clade: Angiosperms
- Clade: Eudicots
- Order: Ranunculales
- Family: Papaveraceae
- Genus: Rupicapnos; Pomel

= Rupicapnos =

Genus of plants

Rupicapnos is a genus of flowering plants belonging to the family Papaveraceae.

Its native range is Western Mediterranean.

Species:

- Rupicapnos africana (Lam.) Pomel
- Rupicapnos longipes (Coss. & Durieu) Pomel
- Rupicapnos muricaria Pomel
- Rupicapnos numidica (Coss. & Durieu) Pomel
- Rupicapnos ochracea Pomel
- Rupicapnos sarcocapnoides (Coss. & Durieu) Pomel
