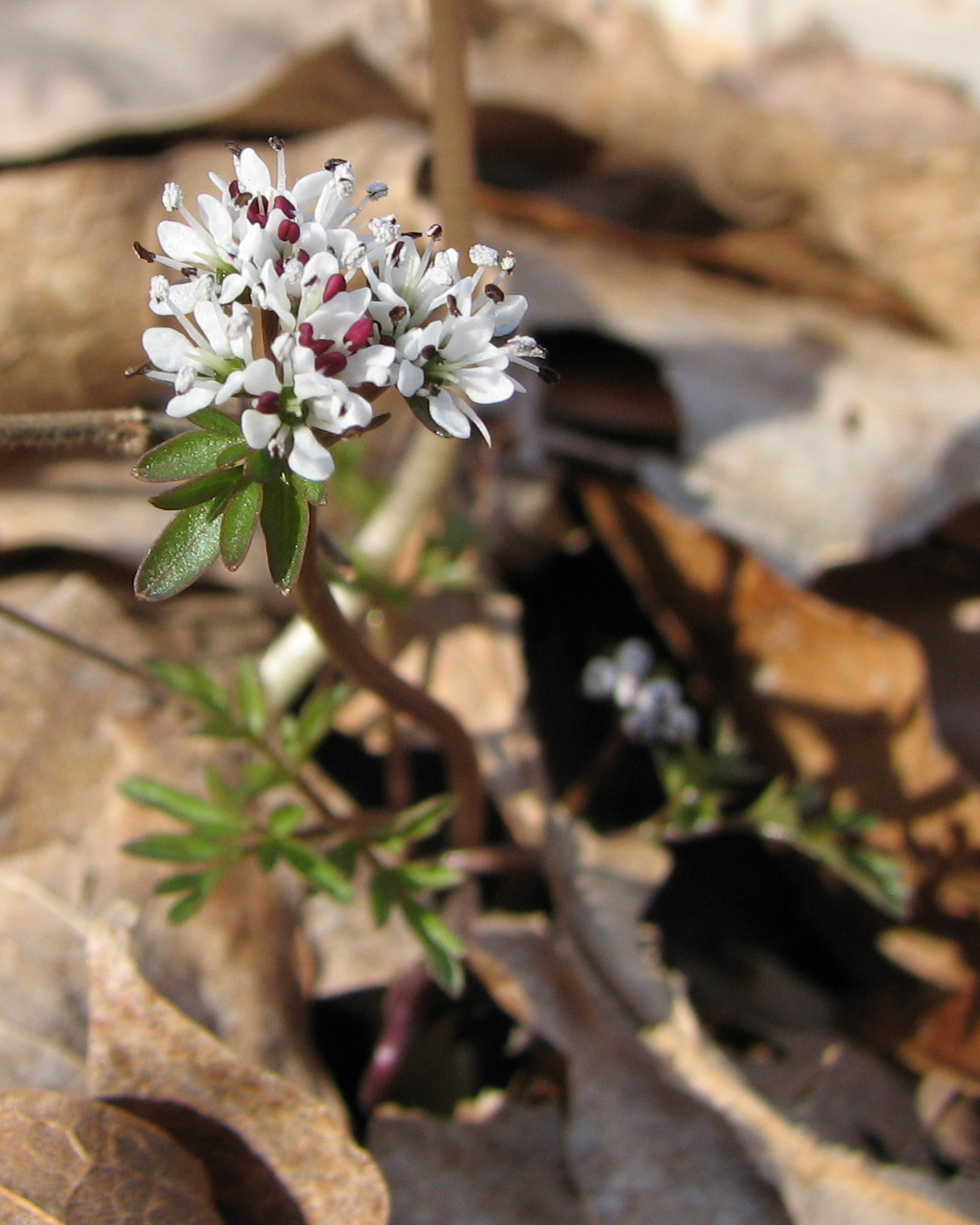

Conservation status
- Secure (NatureServe)

Scientific classification
- Kingdom: Plantae
- Clade: Tracheophytes
- Clade: Angiosperms
- Clade: Eudicots
- Clade: Asterids
- Order: Apiales
- Family: Apiaceae
- Subfamily: Apioideae
- Tribe: Erigenieae; Rydb.
- Genus: Erigenia; Nutt.
- Species: E. bulbosa

Binomial name
- Erigenia bulbosa (Michx.) Nutt.

= Erigenia =

Genus of flowering plants

Erigenia bulbosa, also known as harbinger of spring or pepper and salt, is a flowering perennial plant in the family Apiaceae. E. bulbosa is the only species in the genus Erigenia and tribe Erigenieae. This plant is known as harbinger of spring because it is one of the earliest blooming native wildflowers of rich forests in the mid-latitude United States. Throughout most of its range it blooms from late February through early April.

== Description ==
It is a small spring ephemeral reaching only 5–15 cm tall when in flower, and slightly larger afterwards. Each spherical bulb gives rise to a single purplish stem, which terminates in an umbel. The flowers have white petals and large dark-reddish anthers. The teardrop shaped petals are 3-4 millimeters long, widely spaced and do not touch each other. As is characteristic of the carrot family, the leaves of this plant are sheathed at the base and pinnately divided into many small sections.

== Distribution and habitat ==
Harbinger of spring is an occasional plant in rich hardwood forests of eastern North America. It is found as far north as central New York and southern Wisconsin, west to the western Ozarks, and south to central Alabama. It is also found in extreme southern Ontario.

== Ecology ==
Its typical associates include spring beauty (Claytonia virginica) and cut-leaf tooth wort (Cardamine laciniata). All of these early spring blooming plants are pollinated by solitary bees, and to a lesser extent, flies and honey bees. E. bulbosa has a small daily accumulation of nectar per flower (7–38 μg sugar/flower), but the presence of numerous, closely arranged, simultaneously blooming flowers in the umbel may increase the overall nectar incentive for the pollinators. The nectar produced by E. bulbosa only contains the sugar fructose.

Erigenia bulbosa does not form vesicular-arbuscular mycorrhizal associations with fungi, in contrast to most plants.

These plants are protected in New York and Wisconsin as state endangered plants.

== Uses ==
The bulb is edible both cooked and raw. The Cherokee were known to chew this plant as medicine for toothaches; it is unknown what parts of plant they chewed. This plant is sometimes used in native wildflower gardens throughout its range.

== Gallery ==
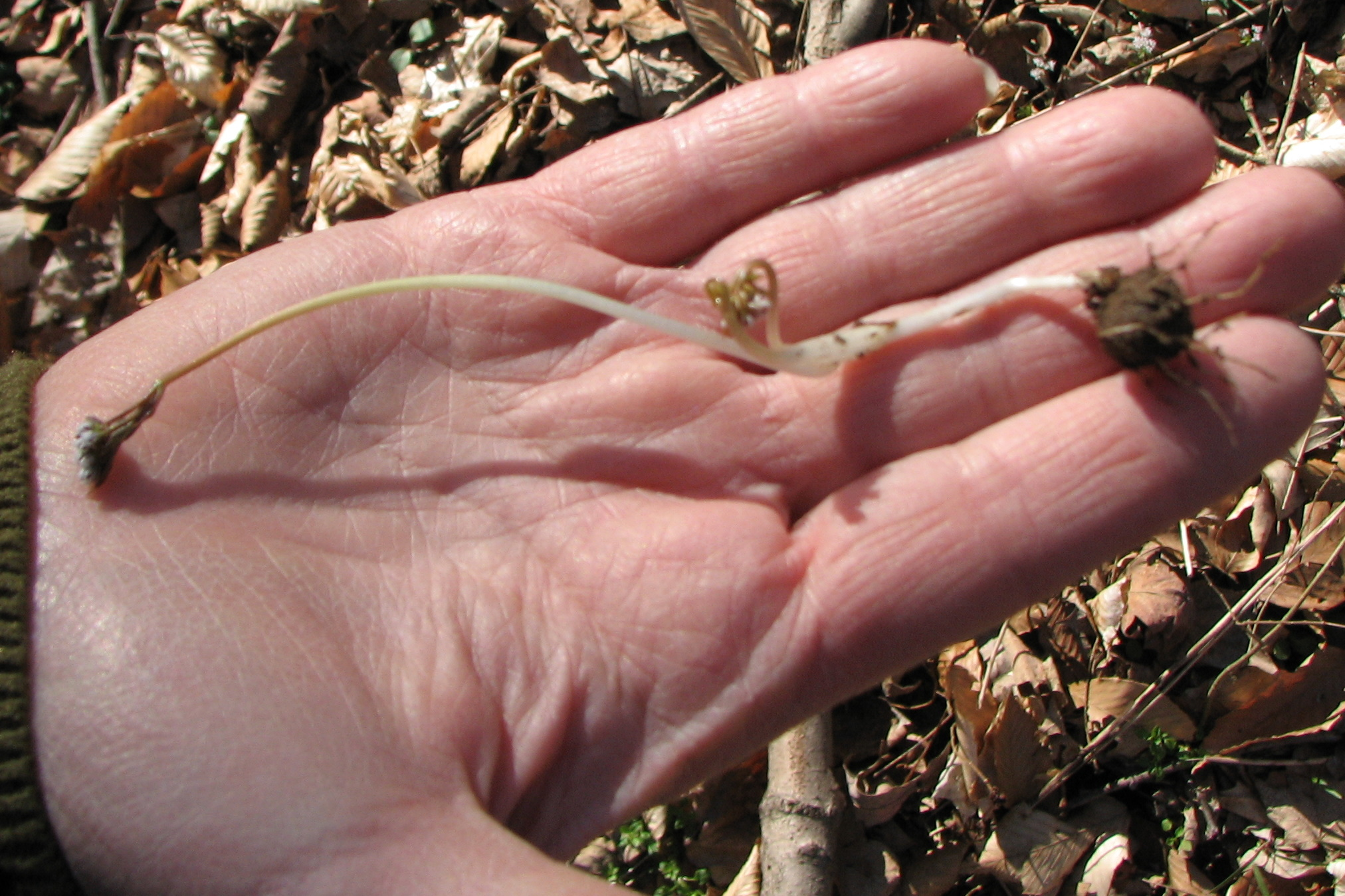
Whole plant of E. bulbosa

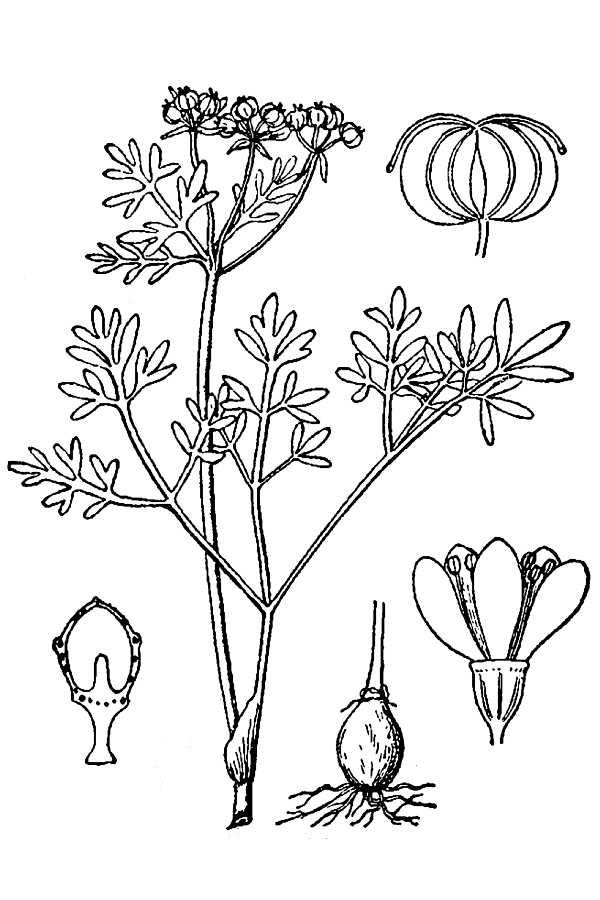
E. bulbosa from Britton & Brown 1913
