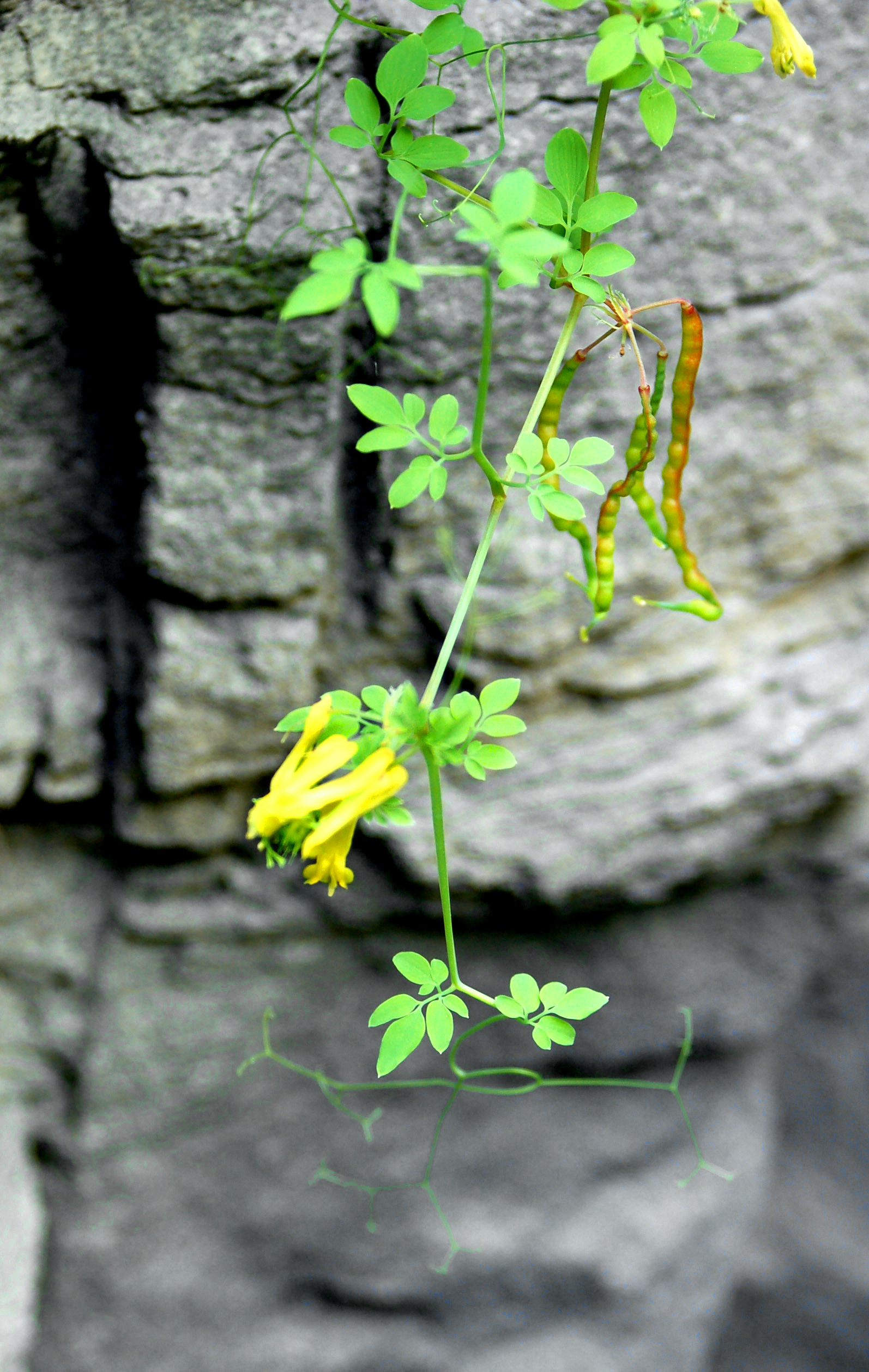
- Dactylicapnos torulosa

Scientific classification
- Kingdom: Plantae
- Clade: Tracheophytes
- Clade: Angiosperms
- Clade: Eudicots
- Order: Ranunculales
- Family: Papaveraceae
- Subfamily: Fumarioideae
- Tribe: Fumarieae
- Subtribe: Corydalinae
- Genus: Dactylicapnos; Wall.

Species
- Dactylicapnos burmanica (K.R.Stern) Lidén; Dactylicapnos gaoligongshanensis Lidén; Dactylicapnos grandifoliolata Merr.; Dactylicapnos leiosperma Lidén; Dactylicapnos lichiangensis (Fedde) Hand.-Mazz.; Dactylicapnos macrocapnos (Prain) Hutch.; Dactylicapnos roylei (Hook.f. & Thomson) Hutch.; Dactylicapnos scandens (D.Don) Hutch.; Dactylicapnos schneideri (Fedde) Lidén; Dactylicapnos torulosa (Hook.f. & Thomson) Hutch.; Dactylicapnos ventii (Khanh) Lidén

= Dactylicapnos =

Genus of flowering plants in the poppy family

Dactylicapnos (climbing dicentra; formerly included in Dicentra) is a genus of frost-tender perennial or annual climbers native to the Himalayas, northern Burma, central southern China, and northern Vietnam.

== Description ==
Leaves are compound, with leaflets arranged in threes (perennial species) or pinnately (mostly annuals). The leaflet at the end of each leaf is transformed into a branched tendril.

Flowers are heart-shaped and have four pale yellow to orange petals. The outer petals are pouched at the base and bent slightly outwards at the tip.

The fruit is a capsule with two valves, dehiscent in most species, but indehiscent in D. scandens.
