= Cryptocapnos =

Scientific classification
- Kingdom: Plantae
- Clade: Tracheophytes
- Clade: Angiosperms
- Clade: Eudicots
- Order: Ranunculales
- Family: Papaveraceae
- Genus: Cryptocapnos; Rech.f.

Genus of flowering plants

Cryptocapnos is a genus of flowering plants belonging to the family Papaveraceae.

Its native range is Afghanistan.

Species:

- Cryptocapnos chasmophyticus Rech.f.
