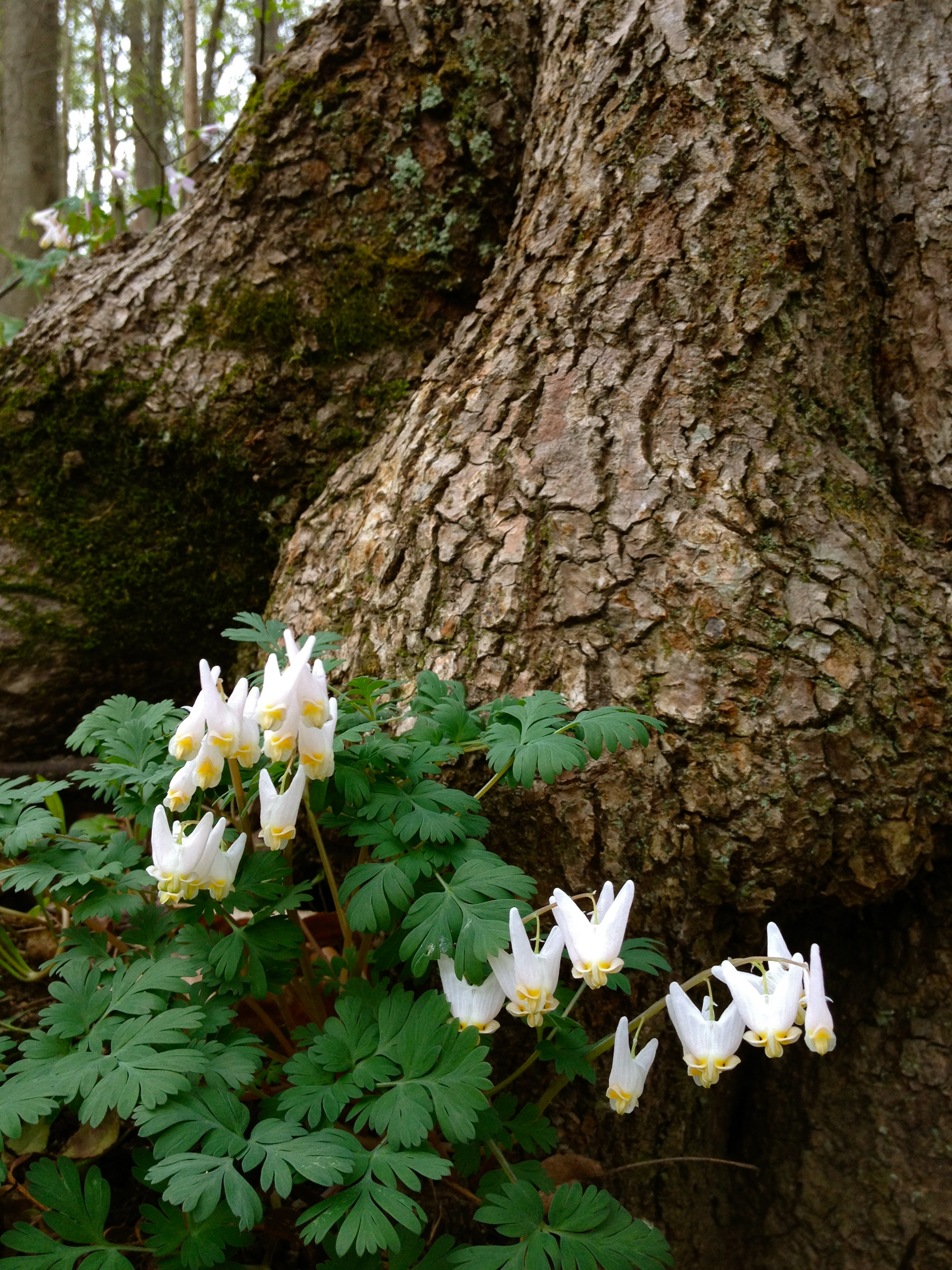

Conservation status
- Secure (NatureServe)

Scientific classification
- Kingdom: Plantae
- Clade: Tracheophytes
- Clade: Angiosperms
- Clade: Eudicots
- Order: Ranunculales
- Family: Papaveraceae
- Genus: Dicentra
- Species: D. cucullaria

Binomial name
- Dicentra cucullaria (L.) Bernh.
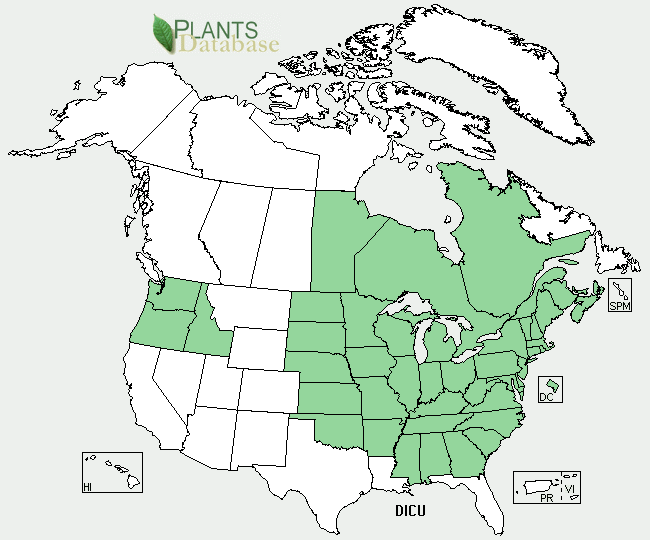
- Natural range in North America

= Dicentra cucullaria =

Species of flowering plant in the poppy family

Dicentra cucullaria, Dutchman's britches, or Dutchman's breeches, is a perennial herbaceous plant, native to rich woods of eastern North America, with a disjunct population in the Columbia Basin.

The common name Dutchman's breeches derives from their white flowers that look like white breeches.

== Description ==
The rootstock is a cluster of small pink to white teardrop-shaped bulblets (more precisely, miniature tubers). Leaves are 10–36 cm (4–14 1/4 in) long and 4–18 cm (1 1/2–7 in) broad, with a petiole (leaf stalk) 5–24 cm (2–9 1/2 in) long. They are trifoliate, with finely divided leaflets.

The flowers are usually white, rarely suffused with pink, 1–2 cm (1/2–3/4 in) long. They are produced in early spring in racemes of 3 to 14 flowers on peduncles (flower stalks) 12–25 cm (4 3/4–9 3/4 in) long. Unlike the closely related Dicentra canadensis (squirrel corn), the flowers lack fragrance.

The pistil of a pollinated flower develops into a slender pod 7–16 mm (1/4–5/8 in) long and 3–5 mm (1/8–3/16 in), narrowed to a point on both ends. The capsule splits in half when the seeds are ripe. The seeds are kidney-shaped, with a faint netlike pattern. Each one has a fleshy organ called an elaiosome that attracts ants. Dutchman's breeches is one of many plants whose seeds are spread by ants, a process called myrmecochory. The ants take the seeds to their nest, where they eat the elaiosomes, and put the seeds in their nest debris, where they are protected until they germinate. They also get the added bonus of growing in a medium made richer by the ant nest debris.

The leaves and flower stems die back in late spring after the seed has ripened, and the bulblets remain dormant through the summer. In the fall, starch in the bulblets is converted to sugar, and the beginnings of the next spring's leaves and flowers develop below ground.

The western populations have sometimes been separated as Dicentra occidentalis on the basis of often somewhat coarser growth, but do not differ from many eastern plants in the Blue Ridge Mountains of Virginia.

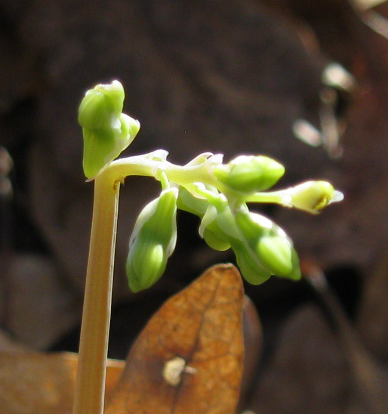
Buds

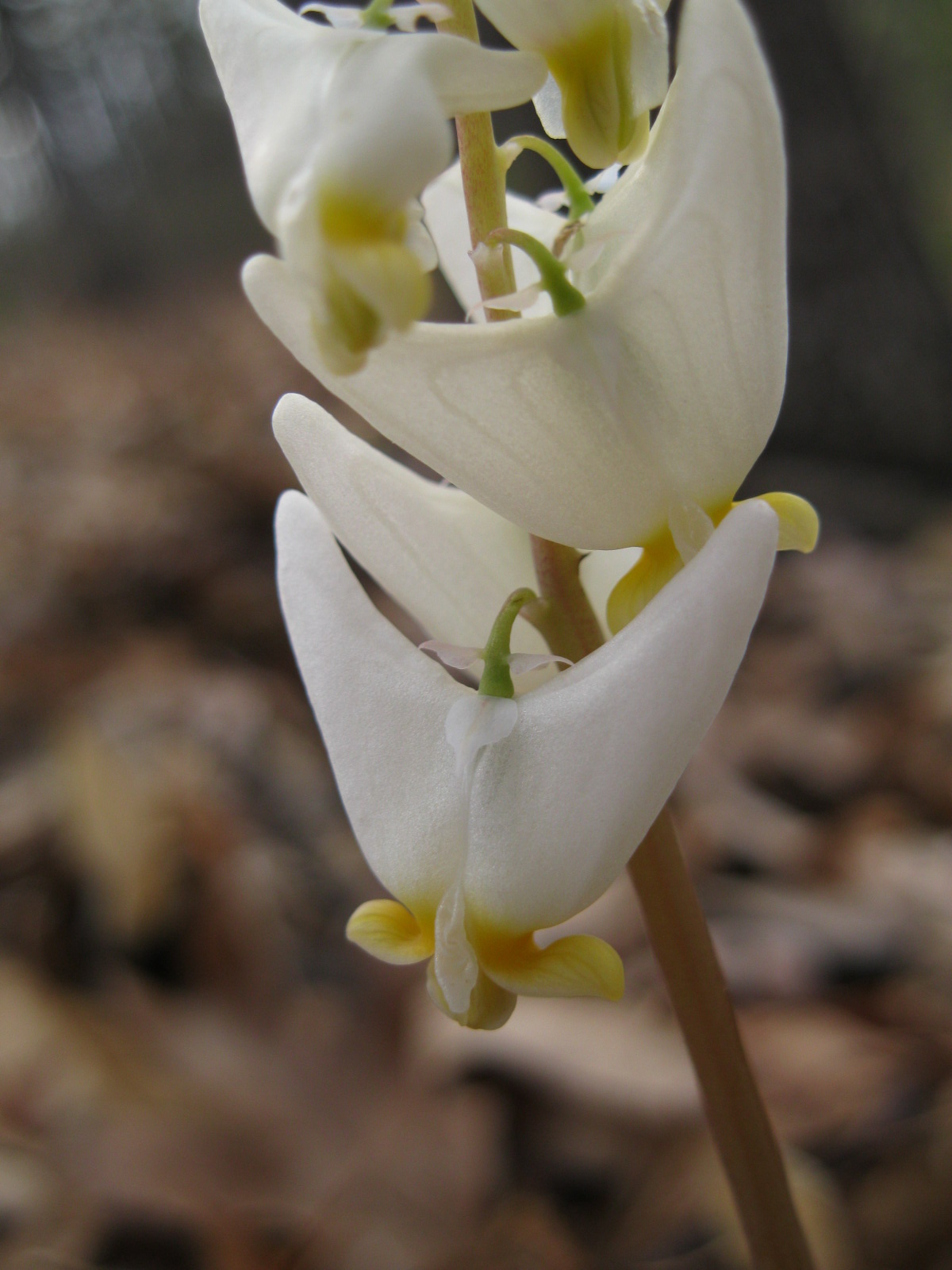
Fully opened flowers

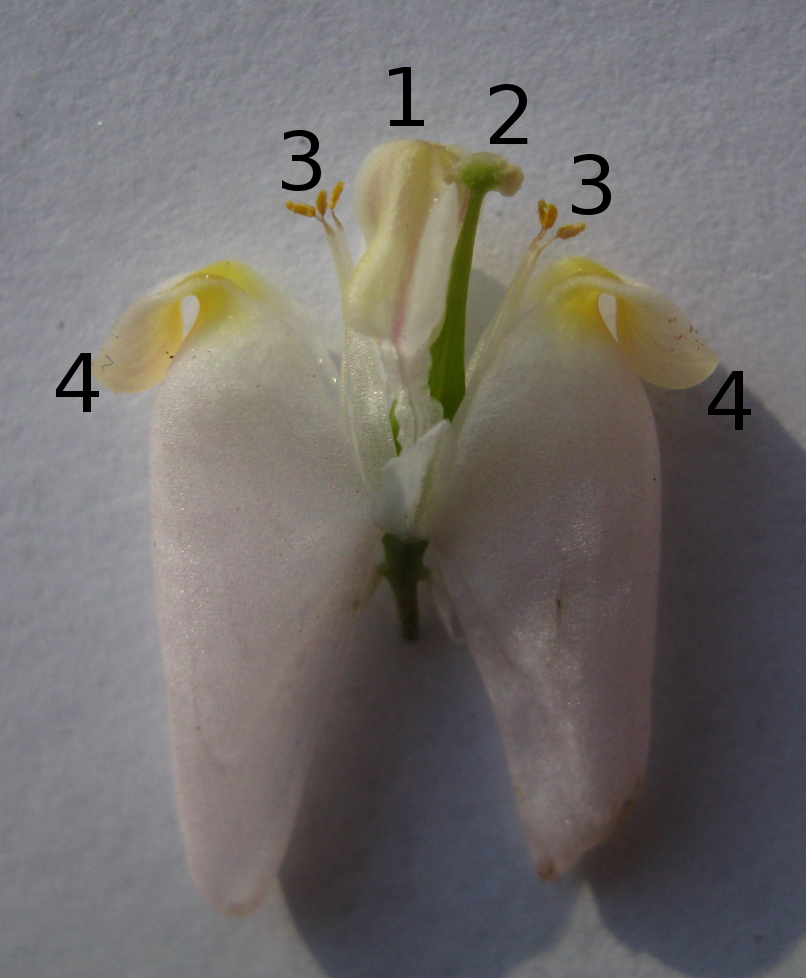
A flower dissected, showing four petals, two stamens, and pistil

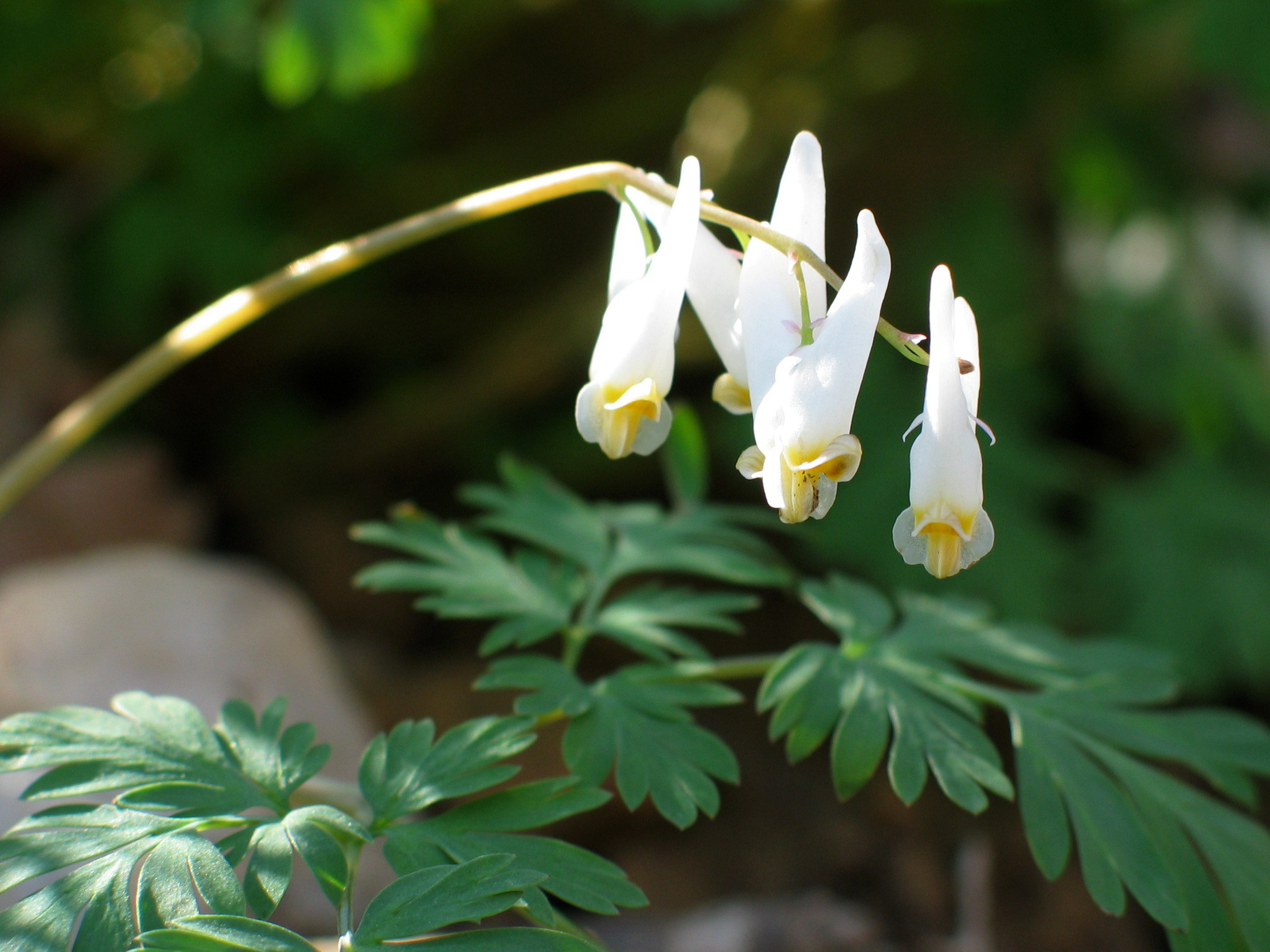
Flowers

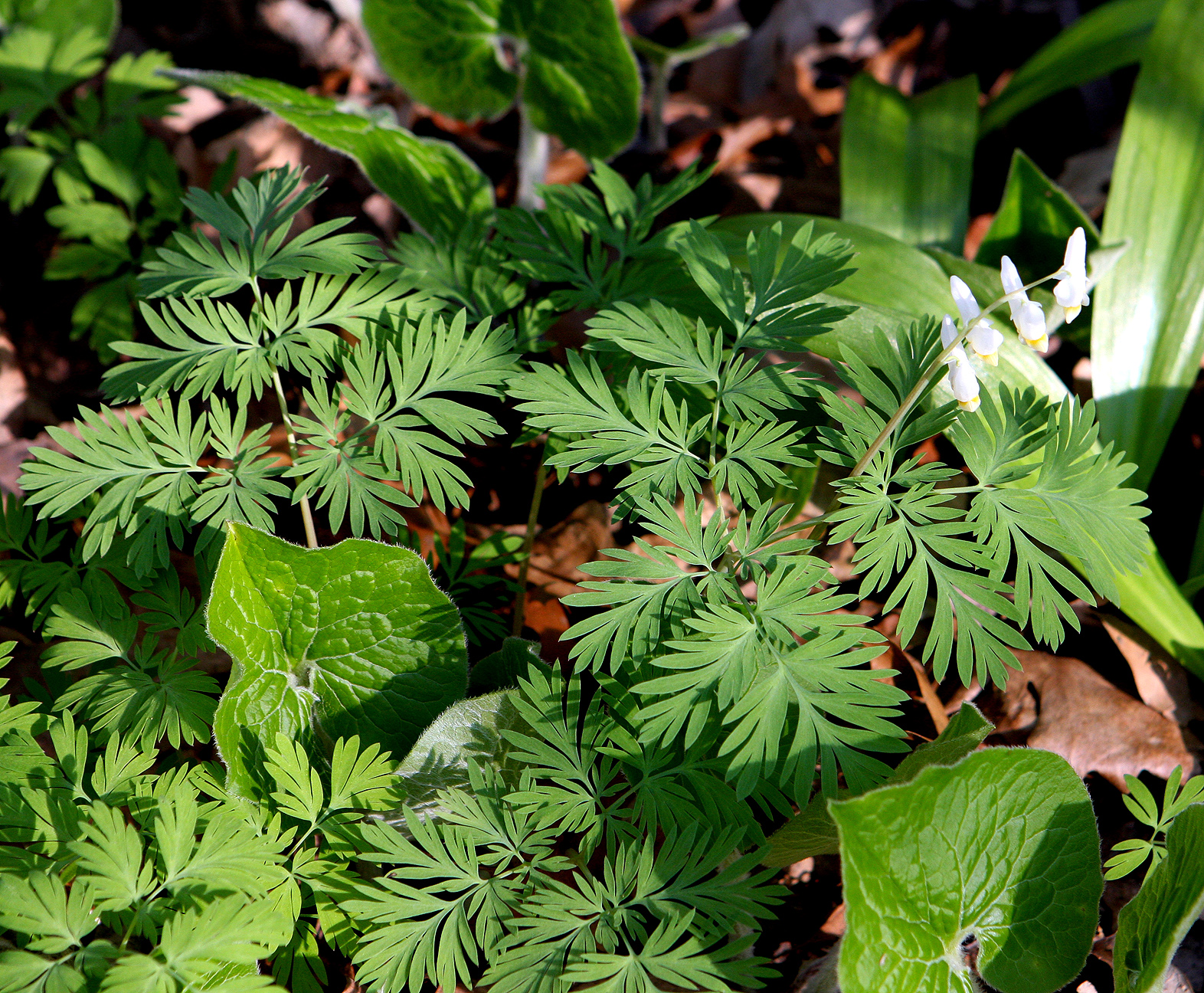
Flowers and leaves

Illustration from the 1913 An illustrated flora of the northern United States, Canada and the British Possessions

== Ecology ==
Dicentra cucullaria is dependent on bumblebees (especially Bombus bimaculatus, a common eastern North American species) for cross-pollination. In fact, the flower structure and mechanism by which it is pollinated indicate that it is adapted for bumblebees, which can separate the outer and inner petals of the flower. They will then use their front legs to expose the stigma, stamen, and anthers. Shortly afterwards, they will sweep pollen in a forward stroke by utilizing their middle legs, before leaving the flower to return to the colony with the pollen. In this way, D. cucullaria is pollinated as the bees move from plant to plant, and the bumblebee meets its dietary needs.

When consumed by livestock the effect of psychoactive compounds apomorphine, protoberberine, and protopine, found in all parts of the plant, has led ranchers to refer to it as 'Staggerweed'.

== Cultivation ==
Dutchman's breeches were likely introduced to cultivation in England when Philip Miller introduced it to the Chelsea Physic Garden. Miller likely received it from John Bartram. The species was, however, not mentioned in American horticultural literature until the early 19th century.

Two clones with pink flowers have received cultivar names: 'Pittsburg', which turns pink under certain conditions, and 'Pink Punk', collected by Henrik Zetterlund on Saddle Mountain in Oregon, is more consistently pink.

Dicentra cucullaria grows best in rich, woodland soil, with lots of organic matter. It prefers moist to average soil and grows best in shade, partial shade or filtered sunlight.

== Medicinal uses ==
Native Americans and early white practitioners considered this plant useful for syphilis, skin conditions and as a blood purifier. Dutchman's breeches contains several isoquinoline-type alkaloids that may have effects on the brain and heart.

However, D. cucullaria may be toxic and causes contact dermatitis in some people.
