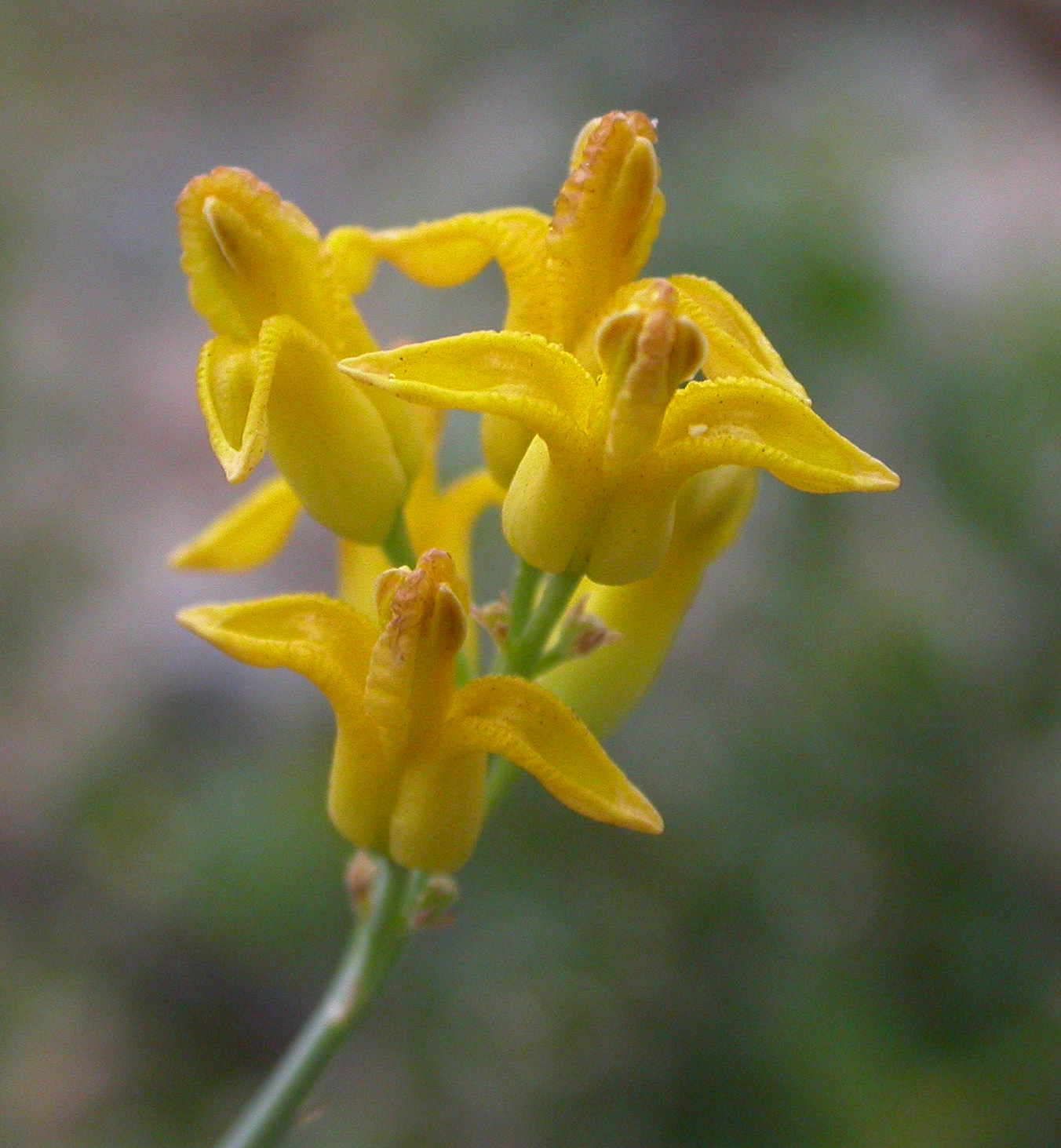

Scientific classification
- Kingdom: Plantae
- Clade: Tracheophytes
- Clade: Angiosperms
- Clade: Eudicots
- Order: Ranunculales
- Family: Papaveraceae
- Genus: Ehrendorferia
- Species: E. chrysantha

Binomial name
- Ehrendorferia chrysantha (Hook. & Arn.) Rylander

Synonyms
- Dicentra chrysantha

= Ehrendorferia chrysantha =

Species of flowering plant

Ehrendorferia chrysantha (syn. Dicentra chrysantha), with the common name golden eardrops, is a biennial to perennial plant in the family Papaveraceae.

It is native to dry, brushy areas prone to wildfire in diverse regions of California, and in Baja California.

== Description ==
Dicentra chrysantha has a taproot. Its leaves are blue-green, with many lobed leaflets.

Flowers are yellow and aromatic, with the tips of two outer petals curved outward from two central petals, borne in panicles at the top of branched stems 1.5 m tall.

Seeds are borne in a capsule 1–2 cm long. They usually do not germinate unless exposed to fire.
