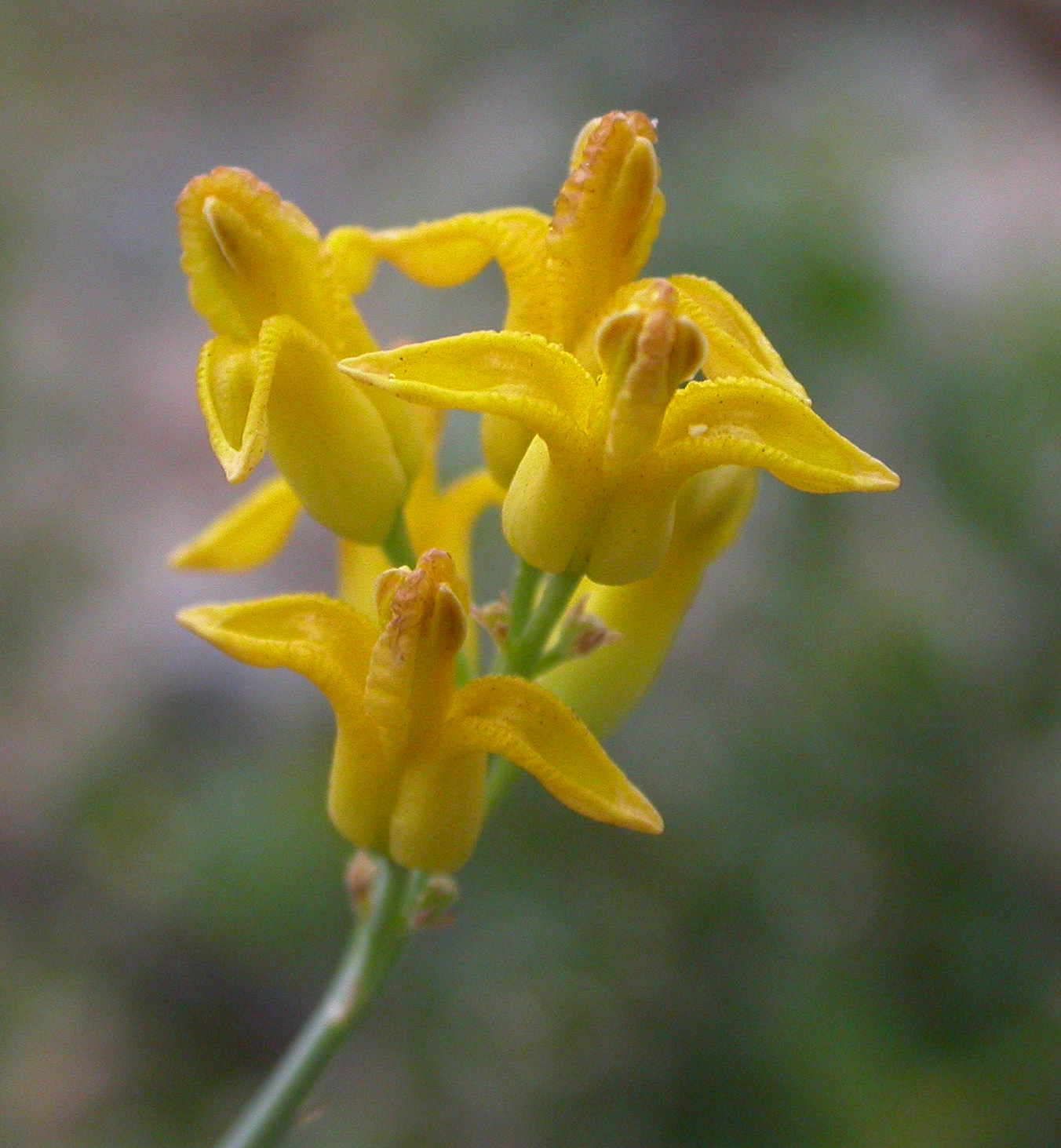
- Ehrendorferia chrysantha (type species)

Scientific classification
- Kingdom: Plantae
- Clade: Tracheophytes
- Clade: Angiosperms
- Clade: Eudicots
- Order: Ranunculales
- Family: Papaveraceae
- Subfamily: Fumarioideae
- Tribe: Fumarieae
- Subtribe: Corydalinae
- Genus: Ehrendorferia; T. Fukuhara & Lidén

Synonyms
- Dicentra subg. Chrysocapnos

= Ehrendorferia =

Genus of flowering plants in the poppy family

Ehrendorferia (eardrops) is a genus of two species of biennial or perennial herbaceous plants native to wildfire-prone areas of California and the Baja California peninsula. It was named after the Austrian botanist Friedrich Ehrendorfer on the occasion of his 70th birthday.

== Species ==
There are two species:

Image	Scientific name	Common name	Distribution
	Ehrendorferia chrysantha (W. J. Hooker & G. Arnott) J. Rylander	Golden Eardrops	California, and in Baja California.
	Ehrendorferia ochroleuca (G. Engelmann) T. Fukuhara	white eardrops or yellow bleeding-heart	California (Peninsular, Transverse, and southern Coast Ranges) and in Baja California.
