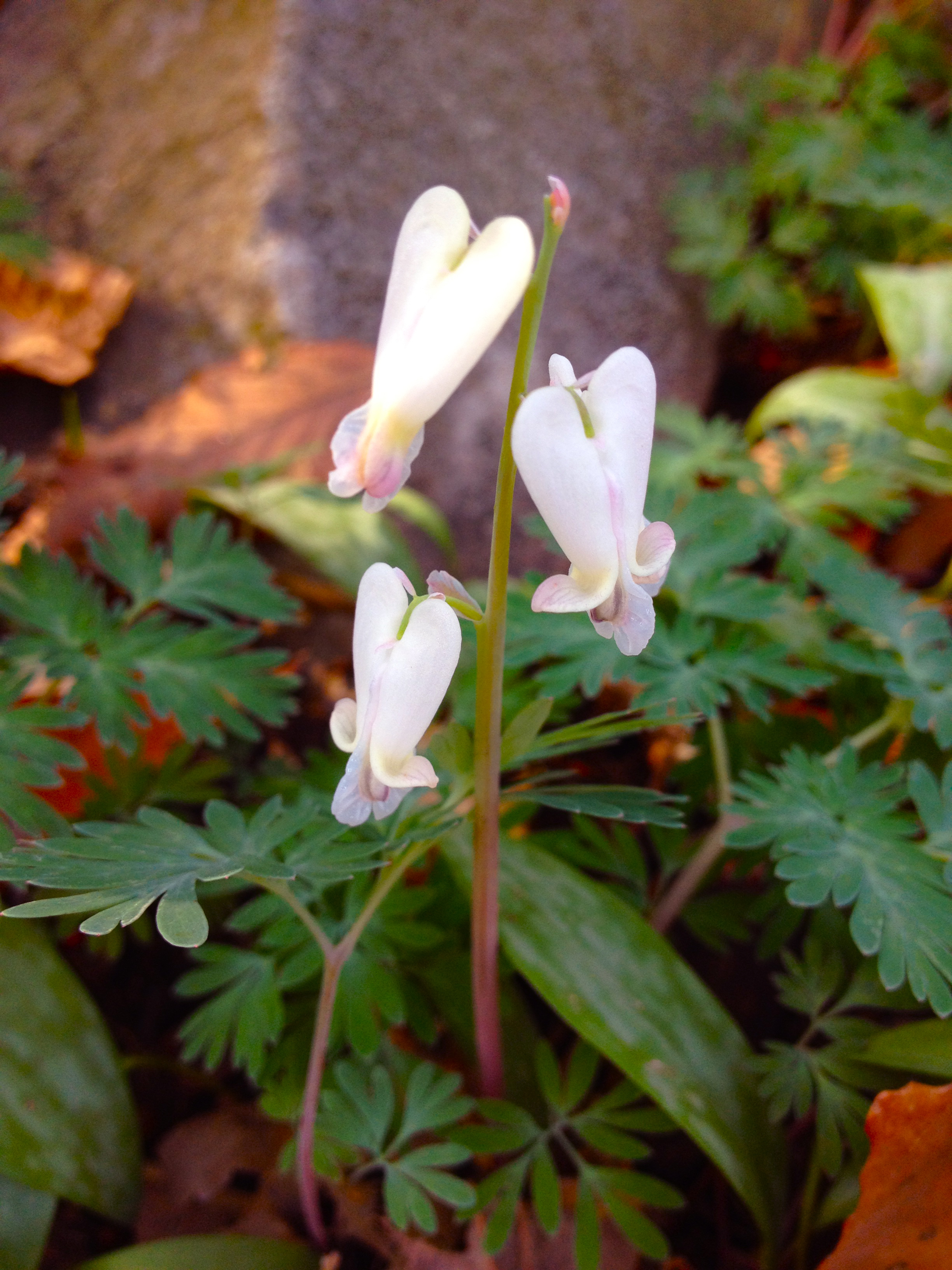

Conservation status
- Secure (NatureServe)

Scientific classification
- Kingdom: Plantae
- Clade: Tracheophytes
- Clade: Angiosperms
- Clade: Eudicots
- Order: Ranunculales
- Family: Papaveraceae
- Genus: Dicentra
- Species: D. canadensis

Binomial name
- Dicentra canadensis (L.) Bernh.

= Dicentra canadensis =

Species of flowering plant in the poppy family

Dicentra canadensis, the squirrel corn, is a flowering plant from eastern North America with oddly shaped white flowers and finely divided leaves.

== Description ==
Squirrel corn has small yellow clustered bulblets (looking roughly like kernels of corn), finely dissected leaves, and white heart-shaped flowers. The flowers are fragrant. It is a spring ephemeral, leafing out and flowering in spring and going dormant in summer.

== Distribution and habitat ==
It is native to deciduous woodland in eastern North America. It is also found among rock outcrops near mountains.
