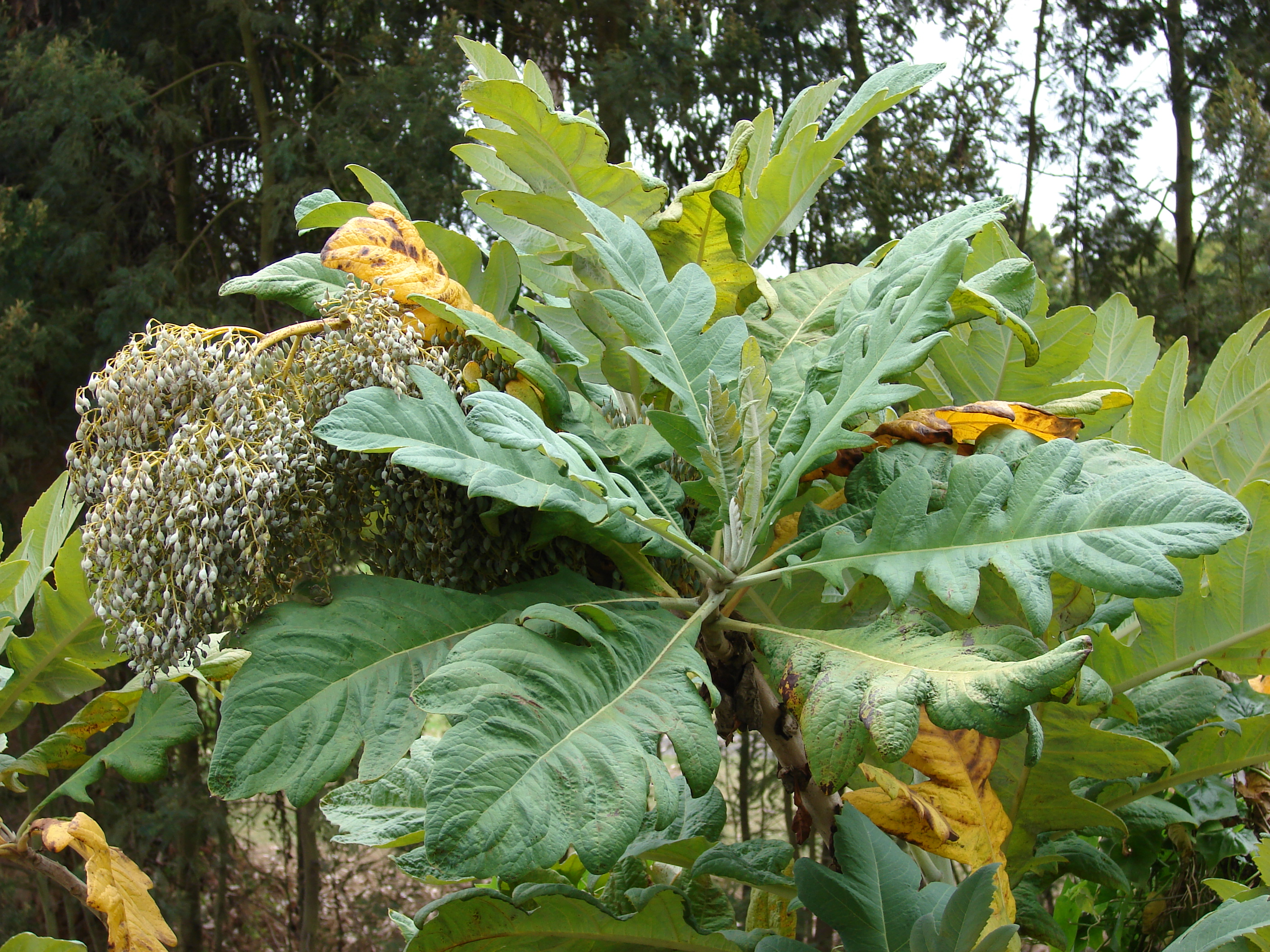
- Tree poppy (Bocconia frutescens)

Scientific classification
- Kingdom: Plantae
- Clade: Tracheophytes
- Clade: Angiosperms
- Clade: Eudicots
- Order: Ranunculales
- Family: Papaveraceae
- Subfamily: Papaveroideae
- Tribe: Chelidonieae
- Genus: Bocconia; L.

Species
- See text.

= Bocconia (plant) =

Genus of flowering plants

Bocconia is a genus of flowering plants in the poppy family, Papaveraceae, that contains 10 species. Carl Linnaeus chose the name to honor the Italian botanist Paolo Boccone (1633–1704). It is native to Mexico, Central America, the Caribbean, and South America (Venezuela, Colombia, Ecuador, Peru, Bolivia and northwest Argentina).

== Species ==
The following species are listed in Plants of the World Online:

- Bocconia arborea Watson
- Bocconia frutescens L. – Tree poppy
- Bocconia glaucifolia Hutch.
- Bocconia gracilis Hutch.
- Bocconia hintoniorum B.L.Turner
- Bocconia integrifolia
- Bocconia latisepala
- Bocconia macbrideana Standl.
- Bocconia pubibractea Hutch.
- Bocconia vulcanica Donn.Sm.

=== Formerly placed here ===
- Macleaya cordata (Willd.) R.Br. (as B. cordata Willd.)
- Macleaya microcarpa (Maxim.) Fedde (as B. microcarpa Maxim.)
