= Bocconia arborea =

- leafy stem with dangling infructescences

Conservation status
- Least Concern (IUCN 3.1)

Scientific classification
- Kingdom: Plantae
- Clade: Tracheophytes
- Clade: Angiosperms
- Clade: Eudicots
- Order: Ranunculales
- Family: Papaveraceae
- Genus: Bocconia
- Species: B. arborea

Binomial name
- Bocconia arborea S.Watson

Species of plant

Maturing capsular fruits

Blade bases long-tapering at base appearing winged

Weedy tree in hedgerow between fields

Bocconia arborea is a species of flowering plant native to Mexico and Central America, and has been introduced elsewhere. It belongs to the family Papaveraceae.

== Description ==
Bocconia arborea displays these key features distinguishing it from similar species:

- It is a bush or tree up to 8 m (26 ft) tall, though usually shorter. When wounded it exudes a yellow, orangish or red latex. Its young stems are woolly hairy.
- Leaves up to 45 cm × 30 cm (17 1/2 in × 12 in) cluster at branch tips, with petioles up to 5 cm (2 in) long. Blade bases gradually diminish toward the stem, appearing to be "winged," while the blades themselves are deeply pinnately lobed, the lobes and blade tips gradually attenuating to points. Blade upper surfaces are hairless while the lower surfaces are densely hairy to nearly hairless.
- Inflorescences are branched, descending panicles up to 30 cm (12 in) long.
- Flowers are numerous but small with only two sepals a little less than 1 cm (3/8 in) long, and there are no petals. Around 12 stamens have very slender anthers about 6 mm (1/4 in) long. The stalked ovary has one style with a 2-lobed stigma.
- The fruit, on a stipe up to 10 mm (3/8 in) long, is ellipsoid and about 8 mm (5/16 in) long, with the stigma and style persisting atop it. It produces one seed with a cup-shape aril at its base.

In much of its distribution area Bocconia arborea can be confused with the similar Bocconia frutescens. However, on Bocconia arborea, the leaf blade base gradually diminishes toward the petiole's base, while on Bocconia frutescens, the base more or less terminates abruptly.

== Distribution ==
Bocconia arborea is native to most of Mexico, absent mainly in the southern Baja California Peninsula and the Yucatan Peninsula with adjacent lowlands. In Central America it occurs in Honduras, Nicaragua and Costa Rica. In Hawaii it has been introduced and become invasive. In Africa it is introduced in the Democratic Republic of Congo and Rwanda. Also introduced into Zimbabwe.

== Habitat ==
In the Mexican state of Guerrero, Bocconia arborea occurs in cloud forests, oak forests, pine-oak forests, forests of pine, tropical forests with both deciduous and semi-evergreen leaves, and gallery forests. Elsewhere in Mexico it is reported at elevations between 1,800–2,000 m (5,900–6,600 ft) occurring in temperate climate where it is associated with both irrigated and rain-fed crops. In Zimbabwe, Africa, where it is introduced, it occurs on disturbed ground such as along roadsides and in woodlands.

== Ecology ==
In Costa Rica, Bocconia arborea leaves are host to the larvae of Liriomyza prompta. The larvae are leaf miners in the leaves.

In Hawaii, Bocconia arborea was introduced as an ornamental garden plant, and became an aggressive invader of dry forests, forming dense stands that crowd out and compete with native plants, keeping them from growing.

== Traditional uses ==
=== As medicine ===
In the Mexican state of Morelos, reddish sap from stems and petioles of Bocconia arborea is used for skin problems such as jiote, which manifests as itching, burning, and scaly patches, mainly on the face. Also ground leaf mash can be applied atop verrugas, which consist of warts or spongy bumps mainly on the backs of hands, fingers and knees. In the state of Michoacán, an infusion of the tree's bark combined with eucalyptus leaves is used to treat diabetes. In past centuries it was thought to cure too many problems to list. In fact, in laboratory tests, extracts of aerial parts of Bocconia arborea in methanol showed antimicrobial activity against several pathogens.

=== As a dye ===
For coloring fabric yellow, the fresh outer part of the trunk of Bocconia arborea is chopped into small pieces and heated in water with alum serving as a mordant, the fiber is added and the temperature is increased to the boiling point.

== Taxonomy ==
In 1890, when Sereno Watson formally described and named Bocconia arborea, he noted that his type specimen was collected in a rich mountain canyon near Lake Chapala, Jalisco, in Mexico, in December, 1889. The plant had been collected by Cyrus Pringle, his #2445.

In 1975, Leslie Holdridge, in the publication Árboles de Costa Rica, treated Bocconia arborea and Bocconia frutescens as one species. Since then, various studies have continued treating them separately, citing modest differences in physical features. In 2026, there appeared to be no molecular phylogenetic analysis clarifying the matter.

=== Etymology ===
The genus Bocconia is a New Latin construction honoring the Sicilian botanist Paolo Silvio Boccone.

The species name arborea is based on the Latin arboreus, meaning "tree, tree-like, wooden."

Bocconia arborea has no English name; "Tree Poppy" is tempting, but that is used for another species.
