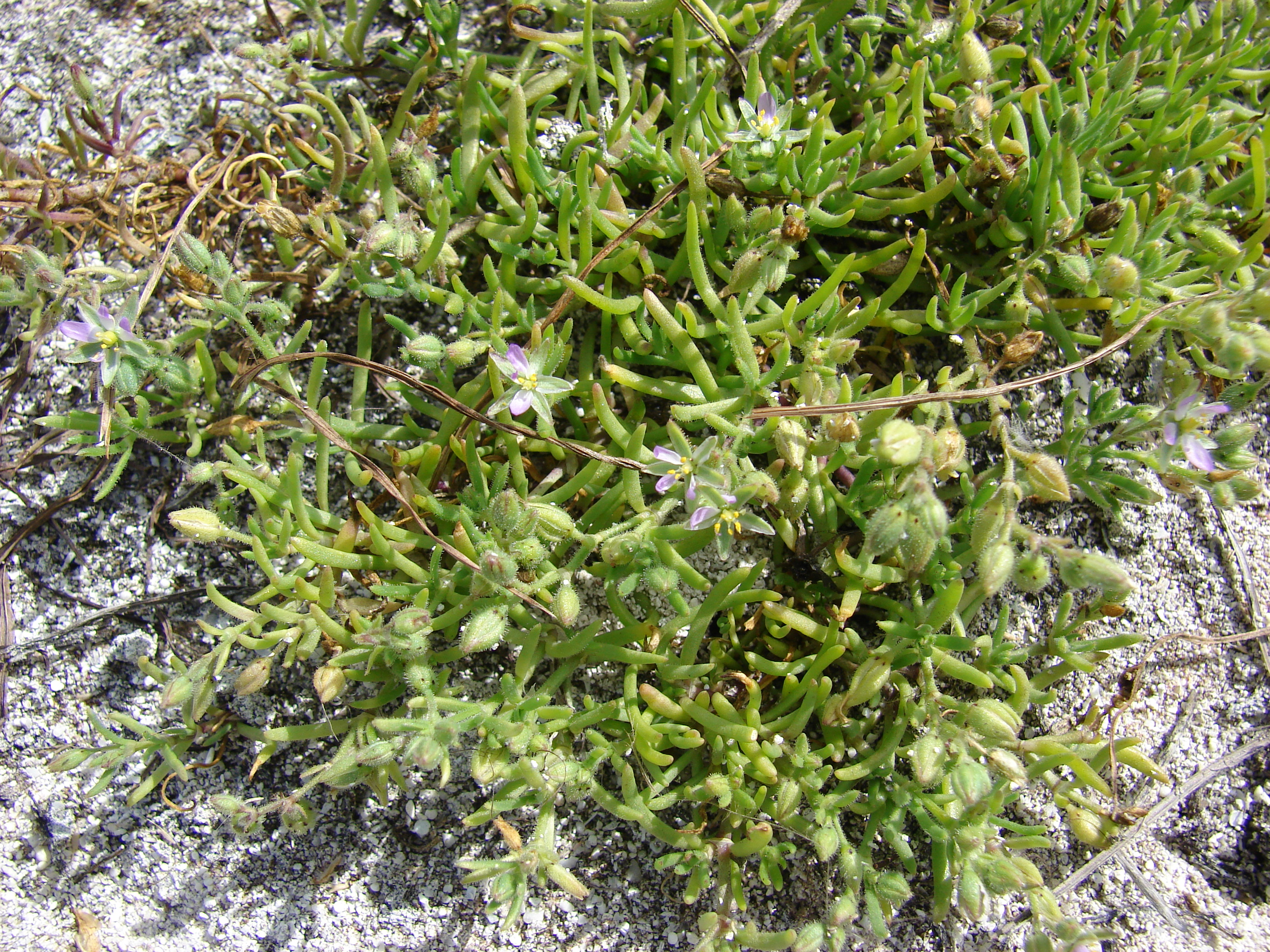

Scientific classification
- Kingdom: Plantae
- Clade: Tracheophytes
- Clade: Angiosperms
- Clade: Eudicots
- Order: Caryophyllales
- Family: Caryophyllaceae
- Genus: Spergularia
- Species: S. marina

Binomial name
- Spergularia marina (L.) Besser

Synonyms
- Alsine marginata C.A.Mey. nom. illeg.; Alsine marina Mert. & W.D.J.Koch; Alsine salina (J.Presl & C.Presl) Heldmann; Alsine salina J.Groves nom. illeg.; Alsinella media Hornem.; Arenaria marina (L.) All.; Arenaria marina (L.) Weber nom. illeg.; Arenaria marina Roth nom. illeg.; Arenaria maritima (L.) Steud. nom. illeg.; Arenaria media DC. nom. illeg.; Arenaria salina Ser.; Buda marina (L.) Dum.; Buda marina (L.) Dumort.; Corion marinum (L.) N.E.Br.; Lepigonum tenue Greene; Spergula marina (L.) Bartl. & H.L.Wendl.; Spergula salina (J.Presl & C.Presl) D.Dietr.; Spergularia dillenii Lebel; Spergularia marina (L.) Griseb.; Spergularia salina J.Presl & C.Presl; Spergularia tenuis (Greene) B.L. Rob.; Stipularia marina (L.) Haw.; Tissa marina (L.) Britton; Tissa tenuis (Greene) Greene

= Spergularia marina =

Species of flowering plant in the pink family

Spergularia marina, also called Spergularia salina, is a species of flowering plant in the family Caryophyllaceae (the pink family). It is known as salt sandspurry or lesser sea-spurrey. S. marina is a sprawling annual or sometimes perennial, with stems up to 35 cm (14 in) long. Like other sea-spurrey species, its flowers have white to pink petals, with sepals usually longer than the petals, at 2.5–4 mm (0.1–0.2 in). Plants are salt-tolerant, being found by the sea and in saline areas inland.

== Taxonomy ==
The species was first described by Carl Linnaeus in 1753 as Arenaria rubra var. marina, and was subsequently treated as a full species in different genera, including Arenaria and Spergula. The Plant List accepts the placement in Spergularia as of August 2016. The species was placed in the genus Spergularia by J.Presl and C. Presl in 1819, who considered the specimens they saw to be a new species (S. salina), but several authors had previously elevated Linnaeus' variety to species rank, and the earliest of these brings nomenclatural priority, even though that species was transferred to Spergularia after 1819.

The nomenclature has been complicated by some errors. In 1822 Wilibald S. J. G. von Besser created the name Spergularia marina, but based his analysis on a 1788 species name in Arenaria published by Albrecht Wilhelm Roth, who intended to move Linnaeus' variety to a full species. Roth was unaware that Carlo Allioni had previously, in 1785, elevated the variety to Arenaria marina, so Roth's name is now considered a homonym. Besser's name Spergularia marina is now considered to be based on Allioni's name and consequently on Linnaeus' variety name; it brings nomenclatural priority from 1785. A further error that has caused authors to come to different conclusions about the correct name for the species, is a name thought to have been published by Peter Simon Pallas in 1776. That phantom name came about because Carl Friedrich von Ledebour cited it after misreading Arenaria maritima as A. marina.

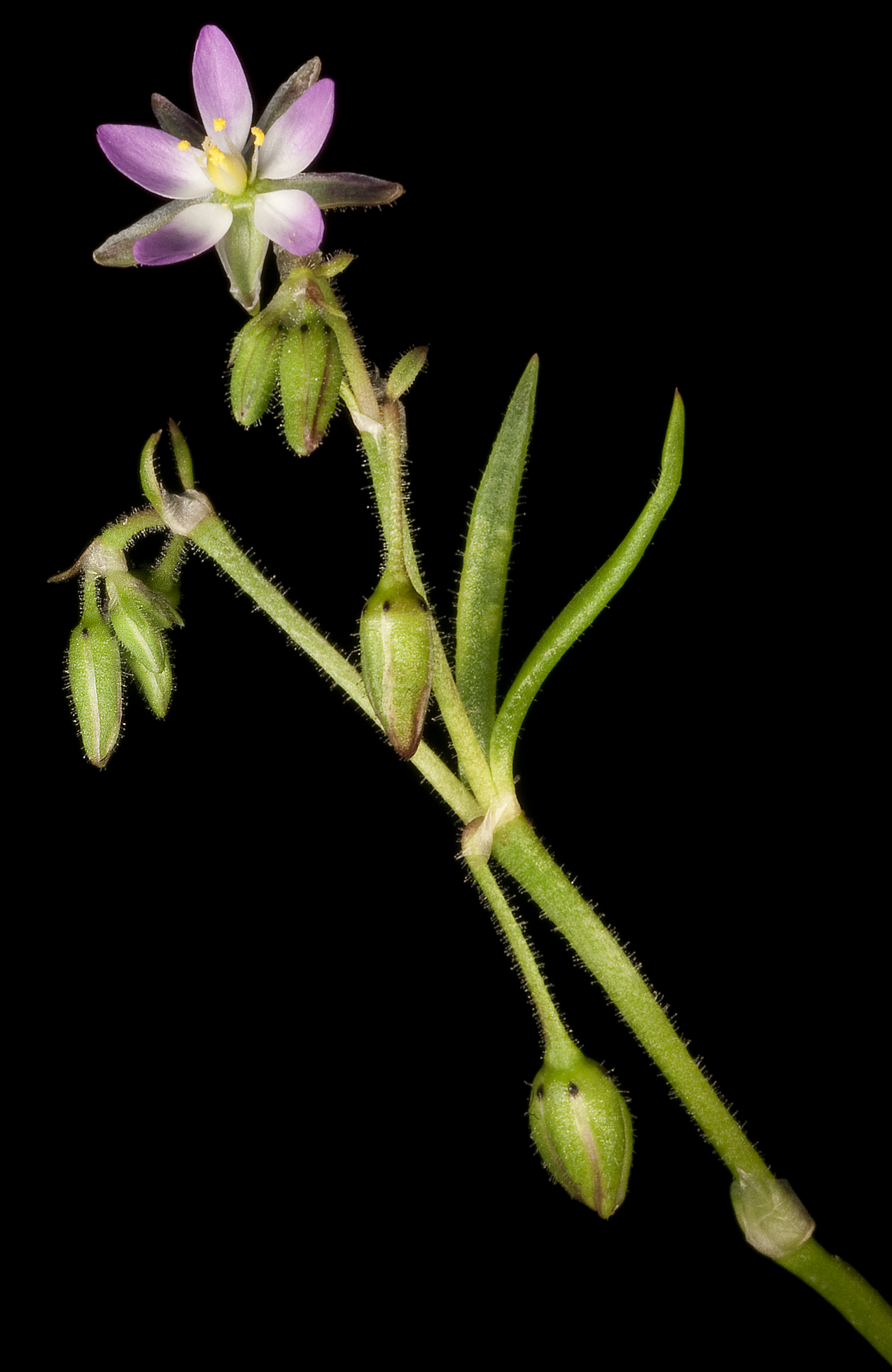
