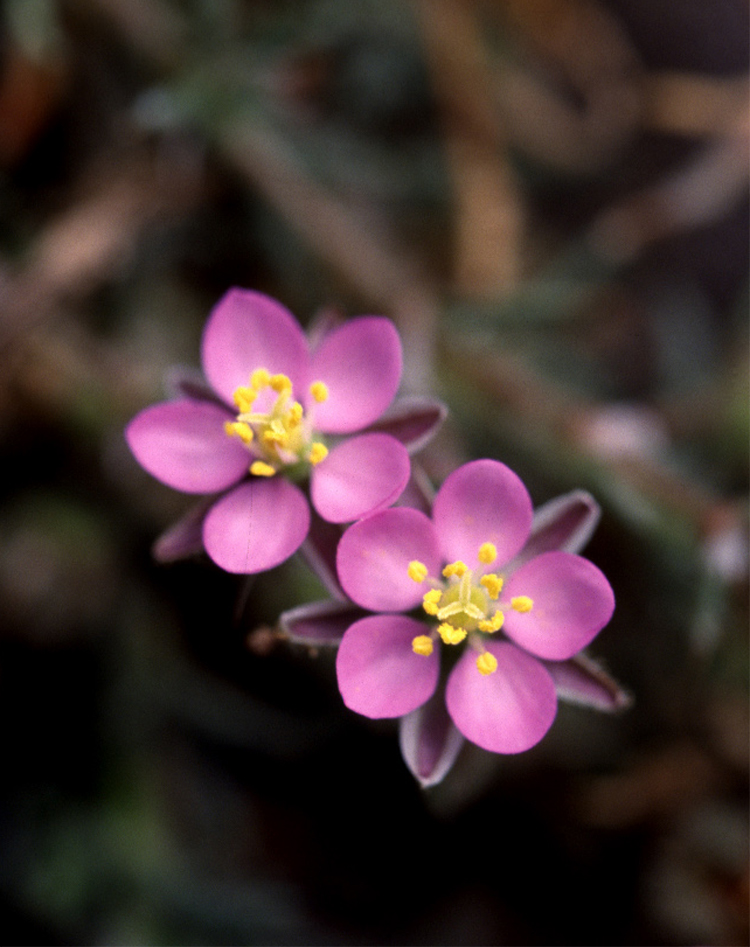
- Spergularia macrotheca

Scientific classification
- Kingdom: Plantae
- Clade: Tracheophytes
- Clade: Angiosperms
- Clade: Eudicots
- Order: Caryophyllales
- Family: Caryophyllaceae
- Genus: Spergularia (Pers.) J.Presl & C.Presl

= Spergularia =

Genus of flowering plants in the pink family

Spergularia is a genus in the family Caryophyllaceae, containing salt-tolerant plants known as sandspurrys (or sandspurries) and sea-spurreys. There are about 60 species.

== Selected species ==
- Spergularia azorica – endemic to the archipelago of the Azores
- Spergularia atrosperma – blackseed sandspurry
- Spergularia bocconei (Scheele) Graebn. – Boccone's sand-spurrey
- Spergularia canadensis – Canadian sandspurry
- Spergularia catalaunica Monnier
- Spergularia diandra (Guss.) Boiss.
- Spergularia echinosperma (Celak.) Asch. & Graebn.
- Spergularia heldreichii Foucaud
- Spergularia macrorrhiza (Loisel.) Heynh.
- Spergularia macrotheca – sticky sandspurry
- Spergularia marina (L.) Besser – lesser sea-spurrey
- Spergularia media (L.) C.Presl – greater sea-spurrey
- Spergularia nicaeensis Sarato ex Burnat
- Spergularia platensis
- Spergularia rubra (L.) J.Presl & C.Presl – red sand-spurrey
- Spergularia rupicola Lebel ex Le Jol.
- Spergularia salina J.Presl & C.Presl
- Spergularia segetalis (L.) G.Don
- Spergularia tasmanica
- Spergularia tangerina P.Monnier
- Spergularia villosa – hairy sandspurry

== See also ==
- Similar genera that have been taxonomically intertwined with Spergularia:
  - Arenaria
  - Spergula
