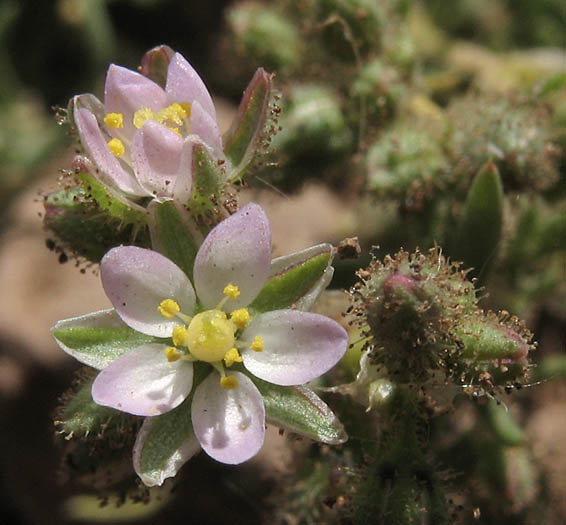

Scientific classification
- Kingdom: Plantae
- Clade: Tracheophytes
- Clade: Angiosperms
- Clade: Eudicots
- Order: Caryophyllales
- Family: Caryophyllaceae
- Genus: Spergularia
- Species: S. bocconei

Binomial name
- Spergularia bocconei (Scheele) Graebn.

= Spergularia bocconei =

Species of flowering plant in the pink family

Spergularia bocconei, Boccone's sandspurry, Greek sea-spurrey or Boccone's sea-spurrey, is a species of the genus Spergularia, in the family Caryophyllaceae. It is named after the Sicilian botanist Paolo Boccone. Scheele first published it as Alsine bocconi in 1843. It was transferred to the genus Spergularia by Graebner in 1919. Pedersen placed the species in genus Spergula in 1984.

== Name ==
The epithet used for this name is often spelled as bocconi, following the first usage by Scheele. This epithet is formed from a Latinized form of Boccone's name: "Bocconus". Boccone however, rarely used a Latinized form of his name: in all his books for example, even the ones in Latin, his name appears on the title page as "Paolo Boccone", contrary to the practice of the time. It is clear that Boccone's name does not possess a well-established Latinized form. Hence the epithet should be formed in accordance with ICBN (Vienna Code) Recommendation 60C.1(a), which dictates that epithets derived from personal names ending in a vowel should be formed by adding the appropriate inflection, which is "-i" in the case of a single male. Thus bocconei is the only proper form. Graebner used this form of the epithet when he transferred the species to the genus Spergularia in 1919.
