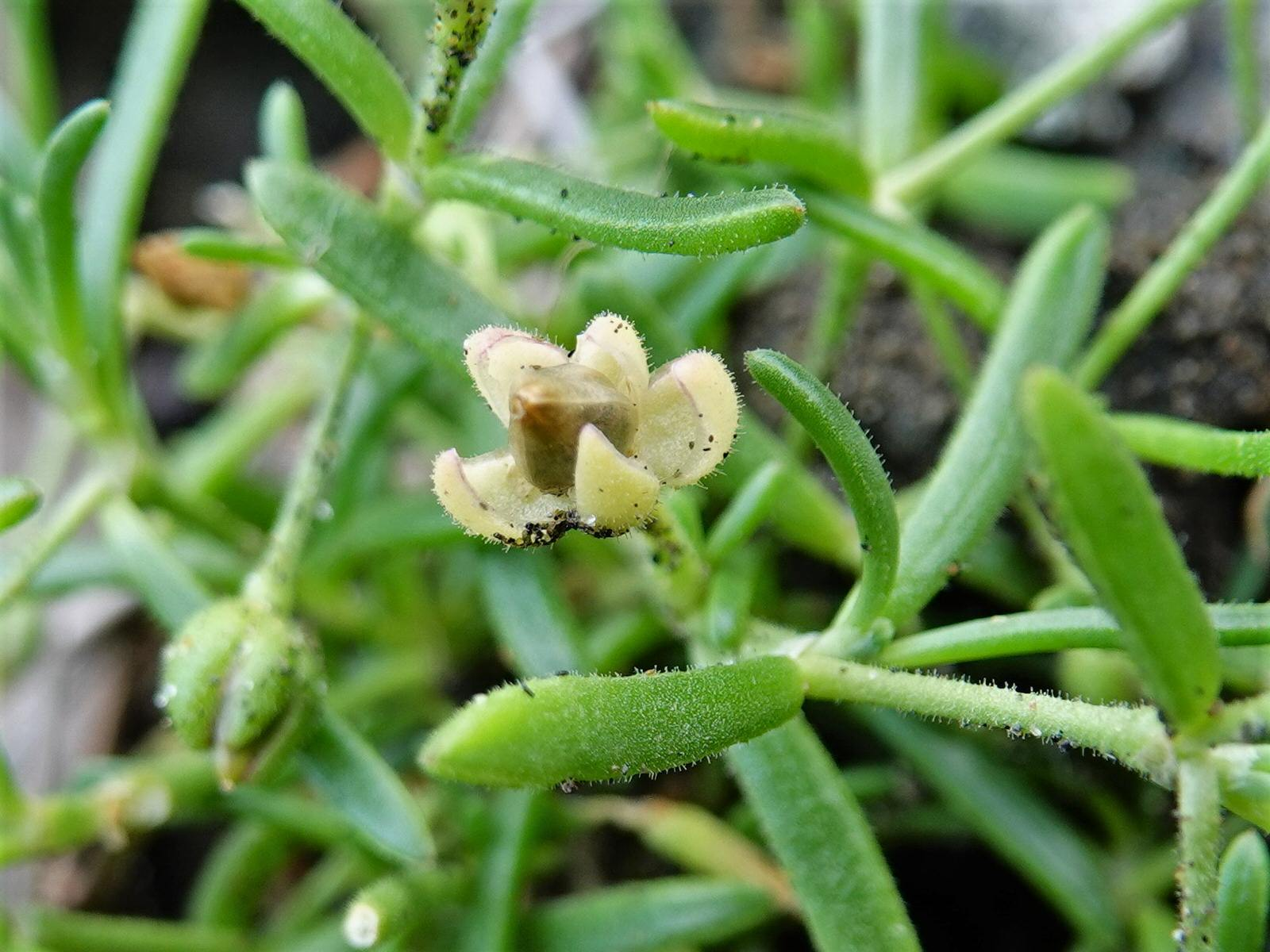

Scientific classification
- Kingdom: Plantae
- Clade: Tracheophytes
- Clade: Angiosperms
- Clade: Eudicots
- Order: Caryophyllales
- Family: Caryophyllaceae
- Genus: Spergularia
- Species: S. tasmanica

Binomial name
- Spergularia tasmanica L.G.Adams (Kindb.)

= Spergularia tasmanica =

Species of plant

Spergularia tasmanica is a species of flowering plant from the genus Spergularia. The species was originally described by L.G.Adams in 2008.
