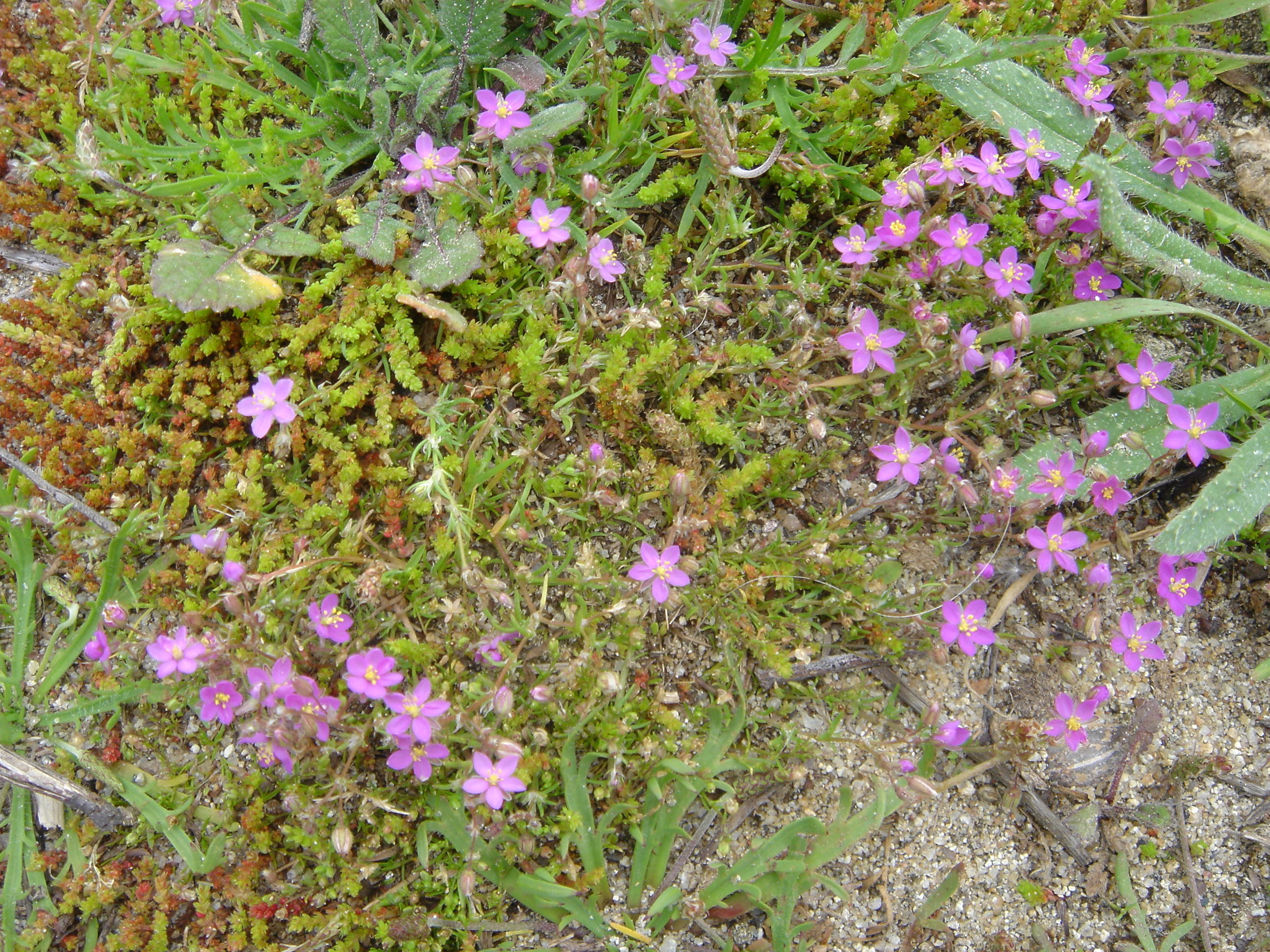

Scientific classification
- Kingdom: Plantae
- Clade: Tracheophytes
- Clade: Angiosperms
- Clade: Eudicots
- Order: Caryophyllales
- Family: Caryophyllaceae
- Genus: Spergularia
- Species: S. rupicola

Binomial name
- Spergularia rupicola Lebel

= Spergularia rupicola =

Species of flowering plant

Spergularia rupicola is a species of flowering plant belonging to the family Caryophyllaceae.

It is native to Western Europe.
