= Pierre Bourdelot =

French physician, anatomist, libertine and freethinker

Pierre Michon Bourdelot (2 February 1610 in Sens – 9 February 1685) was a French physician, anatomist, libertine and freethinker.

== Life ==
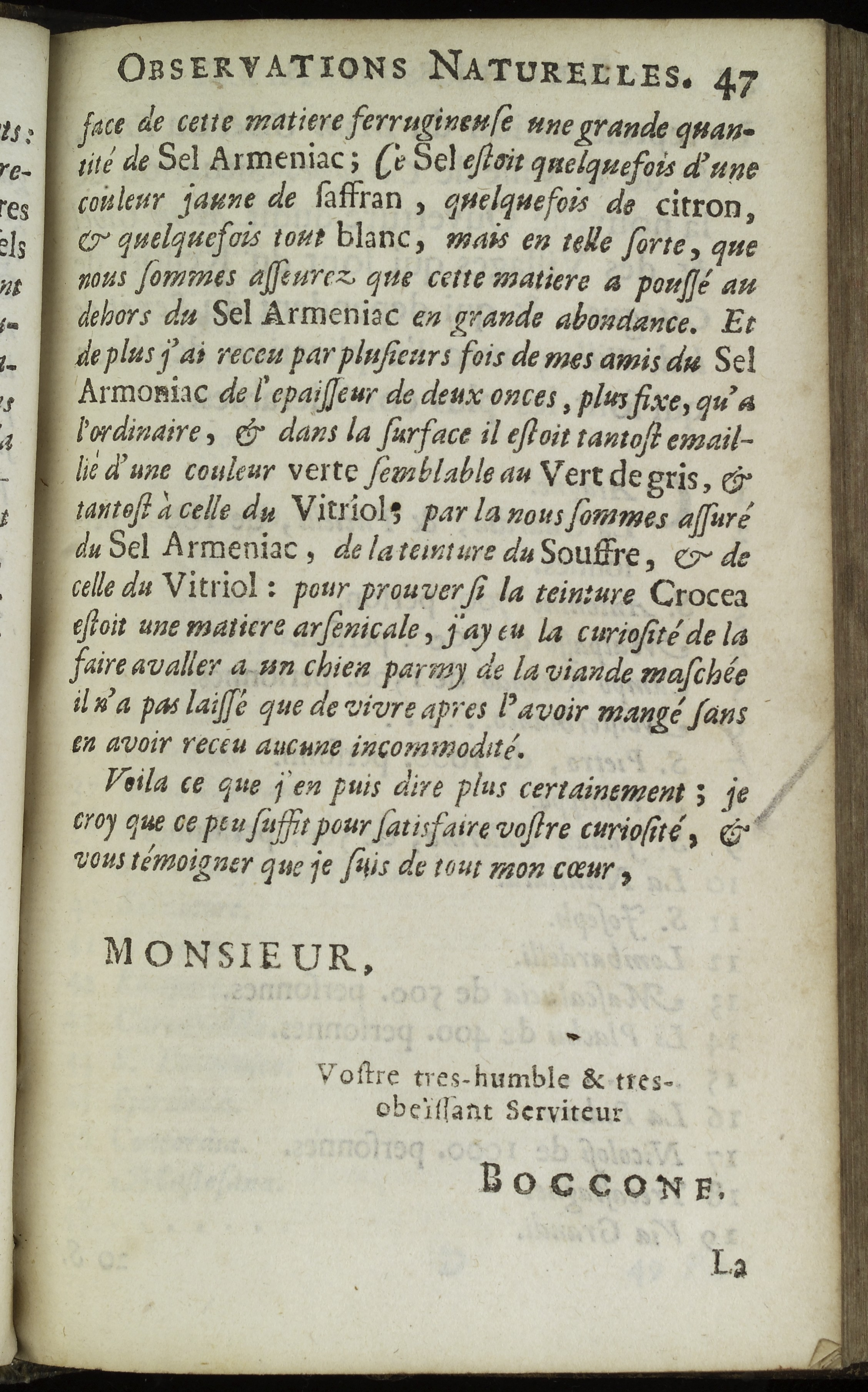
Text from "Septieme Lettre a Monsieur L'abbe Bourdelot, Seignor de Conde et S. Leger, a Chantilly. Touchant l'embrazement du Mont-Etna (Letter concerning an eruption of Mount Etna)" by Paolo Boccone published in (Recherches et observations naturelles de Monsieur Boccone

Bourdelot studied at the Sorbonne (1629) and travelled in 1634 to Rome in the company of count François de Noailles. In 1638 he came back to France and was appointed as the private doctor of the Condé family. In 1640 he founded the Académie Bourdelot, a circle for scientists, philosophers and authors, that came together twice a month. When his uncle died, he inherited a lot of books and manuscripts. When Louis II de Bourbon, prince de Condé, because of actions during the Fronde against Absolutism, was captured by Mazarin, he took off; in 1652 he was in Stockholm, tending to Queen Christina of Sweden. Bourdelot took many manuscripts with him as a present. He had a lot of influence on her with his jokes and poems by Pietro Aretino. Within four weeks Christina, who had suffered a nervous breakdown, seems to have been recovered and enjoying life. [missing] Magnus Gabriel de la Gardie and Christina's mother Maria Eleonora of Brandenburg were shocked by his behavior and Bourdelot returned to France in 1653 with many presents. Bourdelot was friends with Jacques Stella, Gabriel Naudé, and Nicolas Poussin.

== Works (selection) ==
- 1671: Recherches et observations sur les vipères, faites par Mr Bourdelot, répondant à une lettre qu'il a receue de Mr Redi (C. Barbin, Paris).
- 1672: Conversations de l'Académie de monsieur l'abbé Bourdelot, contenant diverses recherches, observations, expériences et raisonnements de physique, médecine, chymie et mathématique, le tout recueilly par le Sr Le Gallois; et le parallèle de la physique d'Aristote et de celle de Mons. Descartes, leu dans ladite Académie (T. Moette, Paris)
- 1715: Histoire de la musique et de ses effects...… (Paris, 1715); published by his nephews.

== Literature ==
- Robert Mortimer Gascoigne (1987). A Chronology of the History of Science, 1450–1900, Garland (New York) : xi + 585 p. ISBN 0-8240-9106-X.
- Katia Béguin, "L’académie du Grand Condé". In: Actes du Coll. Règlement, usage et science dans la France de l’absolutisme (1999), éd. Tec et Doc, Paris.
