= Paolo Boccone =

Italian botanist (1633–1704)

- Paolo Boccone
- Born: 24 April 1633; Palermo, Kingdom of Sicily
- Died: 22 December 1704 (aged 71); Altofonte, Kingdom of Sicily
- Education: University of Padua
- Scientific career
- Fields: Botany
- Author abbrev. (botany): Boccone

Paolo Silvio Boccone (24 April 1633 – 22 December 1704) was a botanist from Sicily, whose interest in plants had been sparked at a young age. Born in a rich family, he was able to dedicate most of his life to the study of botany. In his works he documented approximately 120 previously unknown plants.

== Life ==
Born in Palermo, he often visited the botanical garden (the Orto Botanico) founded in Messina by the Roman doctor Pietro Castelli, who became his instructor. He traveled across Sicily, to Corsica, Paris, and London and took a doctor's degree in Padua. In Paris, he made the acquaintance of Jacques Barrelier and Pierre Bourdelot and published Recherches et observations naturelles (1671; illustrated and greatly enlarged edition Amsterdam, 1674), which concerned itself with various theories of nature, and supplied important contributions to the fields of palaeontology, medicine and toxicology. While in London, Boccone presented his studied to the Royal Society and formed ties with Charles Hatton, William Sherard and Robert Morison. Morrison edited Boccone's Icones et Descriptiones Rariorum Plantarum, which was published in Oxford in 1674.

In 1697, Boccone published his major work, Museo di piante rare, in which described many rare plants of Sicily, Malta, Italy, Piedmont, and Germany. Boccone served as court botanist and herbalist to Grand Duke Ferdinando II de' Medici and subsequently to his son, Cosimo III. In 1682, he joined the Cistercian Order and adopted the name Silvio. He retired to a monastery of his order in Altofonte, near Palermo, where he died on 22 December 1704, aged 71. Boccone was widely respected within the scientific community and corresponded with numerous European naturalists. The French botanist Charles Plumier studied under him in Rome. In 1696, he was elected a member of the Academia Naturae Curiosorum. Plumier named the genus Bocconia, in the family of the Papaveraceae, after him, a name that was later adopted by Linnaeus. With Nicolas Steno and Agostino Scilla, Boccone was one of the first advocates of the organic origin of fossils, rejecting the prevailing view that saw them as inorganic formations.

== Works ==
Caryophyllata Alpina, Geranium Minimum and Geranium Crasso Batrachioides, from Boccone's (1697), Museo di Piante Rare, 1697

This list was retrieved from Bibliothèque interuniversitaire de santé, Paris:

- Recherches & observations touchant le corail, la pierre étoilée, les pierres de figure de coquilles, etc...., Amsterdam, 1674.
- Recherches et observations naturelles. Amsterdam: Chez Jean Jansson, 1674.
- Icones et descriptiones rariorum plantarum Siciliae, Melitae, Galliae et Italiae... auctore Paulo Boccone,... (ed. R. Morison.), Oxford, e theatro Sheldoniano, 1674, XVI-96 p., fig. (dedicated to Charles Hatton)
- Icones et descriptiones rariorum plantarum Siciliae, Melitae, Galliae et Italiae... auctore Paulo Boccone,...cum praefatione Roberti Mossiockii, Lugduni, apud Robertum Scott, 1674.
- Novitiato ala segreteria del signore Paolo Boccone, gentiluomo di Palermo, lettura grata non meno a principi che a loro segretari, per mostrare con faciltà e brevità l'arte d'un accorto secretario, Genuae, apud haeredes Calenziani, s.d. In-12°.
- Osservazioni naturali, ove si contengono materie medico-fisiche, e di botanica, produzioni naturali fossofori diversi, fuochi sotterranei d'Itali e altre curiosità, disposte en trattati familiari, Bononiae, apud Monolessos, 1684. In-12°.
- Lettre de Monsieur Boccone,... écrite à Mr. l'Abbé Bourdelot,... touchant l'embrasement du mont Etna, S. l. n. d. In-12, paginé 67–78, carte.
- Museo di fisica e di esperienze (in Italian). Venezia: Giovanni Battista Zuccato. 1697.
- Della pietra Belzuar minerale siciliana lettera familiare, Monteleoni, apud Dominicum Ferrum, 1669.
- Museo di piante rare della Sicilia, Malta, Corsica, italia, Piemonte e Germania con figure 133 in rame, Venetiis, apud Ioannem Baptistam Zuccarum, 1697.
- Recherches et observations naturelles touchant le corail, pierre estoilee, embrasement du mont Etna, Parisiis, apud Baloin ad Palatum, 1672.
- Museum experimentale-physicum, complectens observationes eruditis et curiosis, Francofurti, apuc Michaelem Rohrbach, 1697.

== Named after Boccone ==
- The genus Bocconia L.

Among others, the following species:

- Achillea bocconii W.D.J.Koch (Achillea, Asteraceae)
- Alsine bocconi Scheele - former name of syn. Spergularia bocconei (Scheele) Graebn. (Spergularia (Pers.), Caryophyllaceae) [Formerly (Alsine, now an obsolete genus, Caryophyllaceae)]
- Chiliadenus bocconei Brullo (= Jasonia bocconei (Brullo) M.Pardo & R.Morales) (Chiliadenus, Jasonia, Asteraceae)
- Eryngium bocconi Lam. (Eryngium, Apiaceae)
- Euphrasia bocconi Guss. (= Odontites bocconei (Guss.) Walp.) (Euphrasia, Odontites, Scrophulariaceae)
- Heliotropium bocconi Guss. (Heliotropium, Boraginaceae)
- Helleborus bocconei Ten. (Helleborus, Ranunculaceae)
- Jurinea bocconi Guss. (Jurinea, Asteraceae)
- Seseli bocconi Guss. (Seseli, Apiaceae)
- Spergularia bocconei (Scheele) Graebn. (Spergularia (Pers.), Caryophyllaceae). Formerly Alsine bocconi (Alsine, now an obsolete genus, Caryophyllaceae)
- Tanacetum bocconii Sch.Bip. (Tanacetum, Asteraceae)

== See also ==
- List of Roman Catholic scientist-clerics

== Bibliography ==
- Giallombardo, F.; van Andel, T.R. (April 2019). "Paolo Boccone and the visual communication of pre-Linnean botany. A comparison between his Leiden herbarium, Paris autoprint and published Icones (1674)". Studies in History and Philosophy of Science. 74: 15–26. doi:10.1016/j.shpsc.2018.12.003.
- Romano, M. (2025). "Palaeontology in the Italian seventeenth-century naturalist Paolo Silvio Boccone". Rendiconti online della Società Geologica Italiana. 65: 66–86. doi:10.3301/ROL.2025.07. ISSN 2035-8008.
