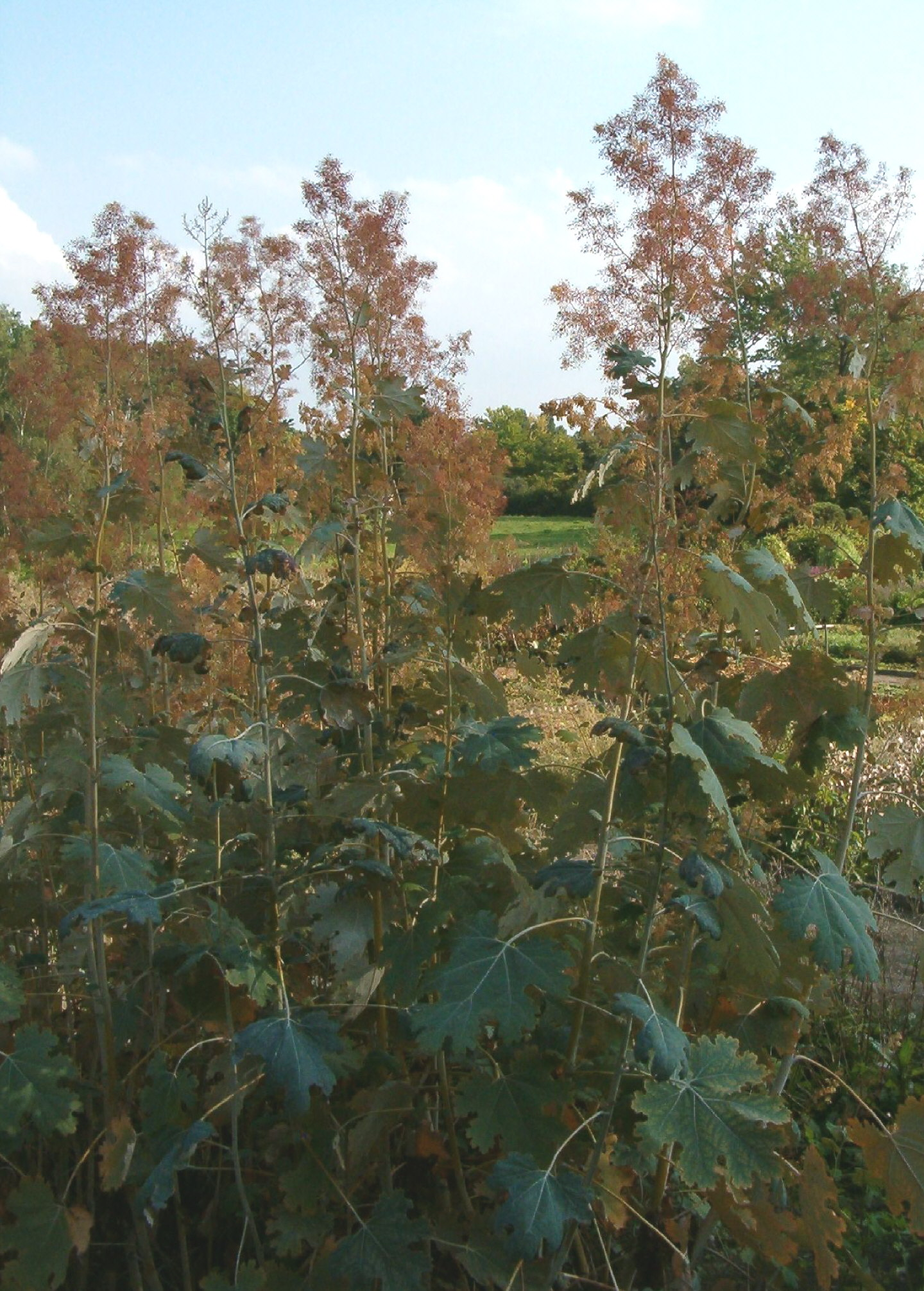
- Macleaya microcarpa

Scientific classification
- Kingdom: Plantae
- Clade: Embryophytes
- Clade: Tracheophytes
- Clade: Spermatophytes
- Clade: Angiosperms
- Clade: Eudicots
- Order: Ranunculales
- Family: Papaveraceae
- Subfamily: Papaveroideae
- Tribe: Chelidonieae
- Genus: Macleaya; R.Br.

= Macleaya =

Genus of flowering plants in the poppy family

Macleaya, or plume poppy, is a genus of two or three species of flowering plants in the poppy family Papaveraceae, native to Japan (Macleaya cordata) and China (M. cordata and Macleaya microcarpa). They are large rhizomatous herbaceous perennials with palmately lobed, frilly leaves of olive green or grey colour, 25 cm (10 in) long, and tall stems with airy plumes of petal-less, tubular, off-white or cream flowers.

Macleaya is named after the Scottish entomologist Alexander Macleay (1767–1848).

== Cultivation ==
Both of the known species and the hybrid are cultivated as ornamental plants. The individual flowers are insignificant, but the combined effect of multiple stems 4 to 6 feet (1.2 to 1.8 m) high can give a striking architectural effect. The plants are unsuitable for small gardens because of their invasive tendencies, but can be very effective as features in large gardens. They spread both by underground suckers and by seeding, so can be difficult to get rid of in some situations.

The cultivar M. × kewensis 'Flamingo' has gained the Royal Horticultural Society's Award of Garden Merit.

== Species and hybrids ==
- Macleaya cordata
- Macleaya microcarpa
- Macleaya × kewensis (Macleaya cordata × Macleaya microcarpa)
