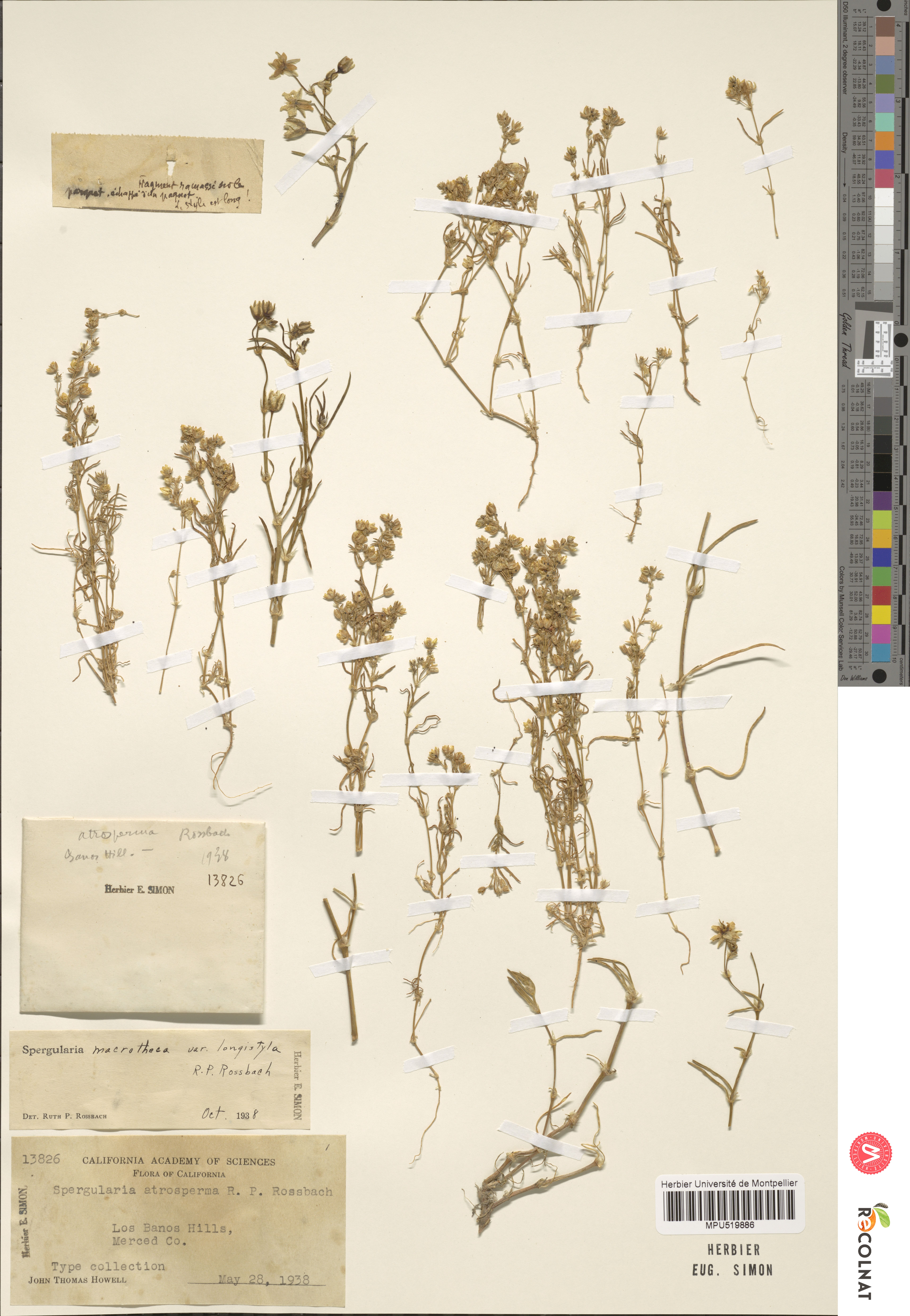

Scientific classification
- Kingdom: Plantae
- Clade: Tracheophytes
- Clade: Angiosperms
- Clade: Eudicots
- Order: Caryophyllales
- Family: Caryophyllaceae
- Genus: Spergularia
- Species: S. atrosperma

Binomial name
- Spergularia atrosperma R.P.Rossb.

= Spergularia atrosperma =

Species of flowering plant in the pink family

Spergularia atrosperma is a species of flowering plant in the family Caryophyllaceae known by the common name blackseed sandspurry. It is native to California and Nevada, where it grows in muddy and sandy habitat, often in moist alkaline substrates. It is a small annual herb producing a slender stem up to 15 centimeters (5.9 in) long. It is lined with fleshy linear leaves. The inflorescence bears small flowers with five pointed sepals and five oval white or pink petals. The fruit is a capsule containing shiny, sometimes iridescent, black seeds.
