= Charles Hatton =

English botanist and horticulturalist

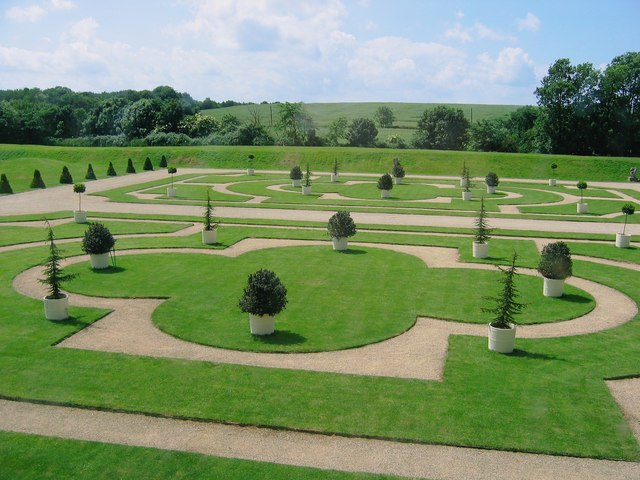
Kirby Hall's garden

Hon. Charles Hatton (11 November 1635–after January 1708) was an English botanist and horticulturalist. He was the second son of Christopher Hatton, 1st Baron Hatton, and the younger brother of Christopher Hatton, 1st Viscount Hatton.

As a younger son, Charles did not have the family advantages of his brother, and was active as a botanist. Paolo Boccone dedicated his Icones & descriptiones rariorum plantarum to him in 1674. He also collaborated with Robert Morison on Plantarum historiae universalis Oxoniensis.

Hatton also took a strong interest in the preservation of books and manuscripts. He praised William Sancroft for collecting lists of manuscripts in private libraries and provided sources for Thomas Tanner's catalogue. Around 1775, Charles donated three manuscripts to the Bodleian Library, including an outstanding copy of Geoffrey Chaucer's Canterbury Tales, which are now given the shelfmark 'MS. Hatton Donat.'
