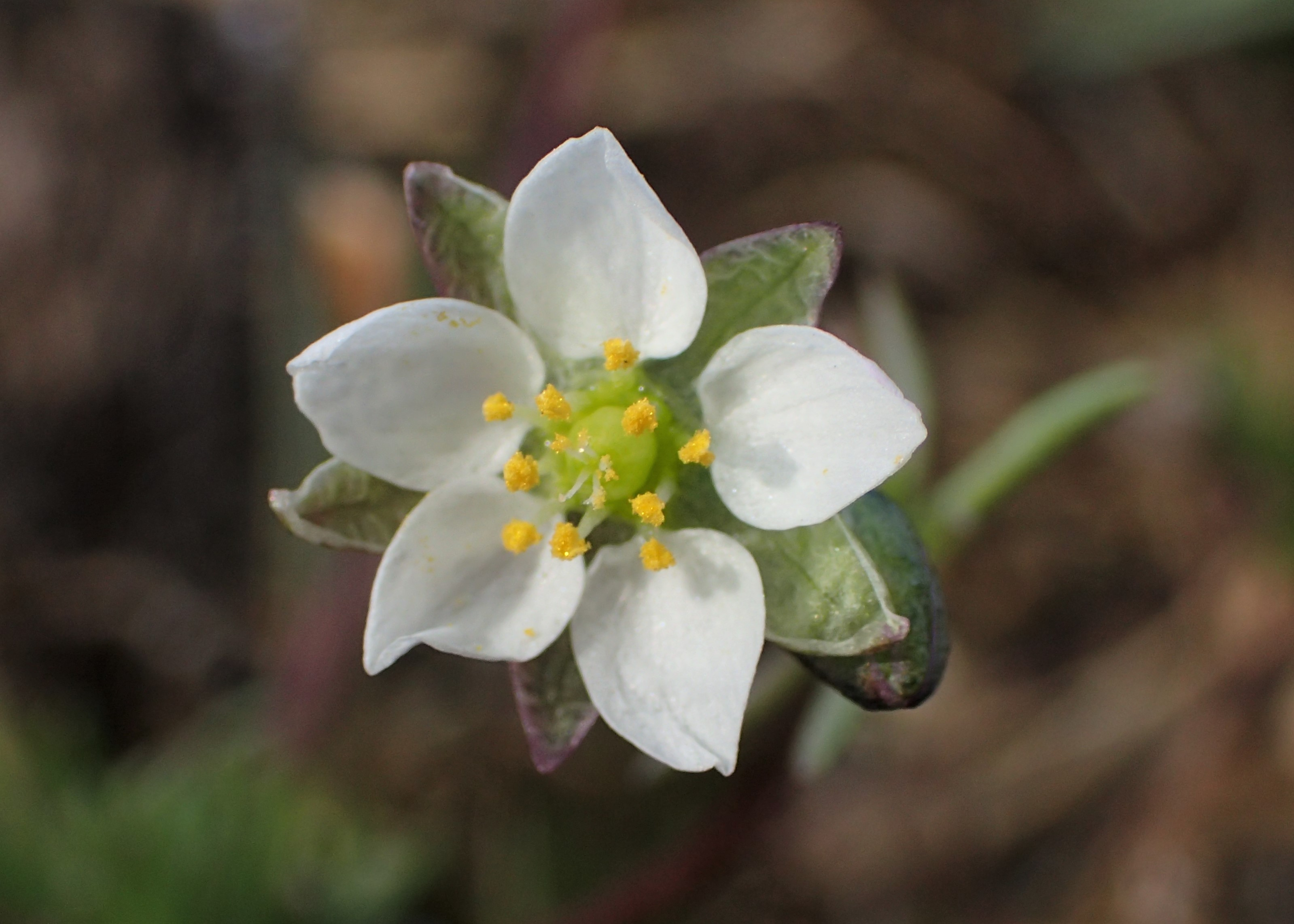

Scientific classification
- Kingdom: Plantae
- Clade: Tracheophytes
- Clade: Angiosperms
- Clade: Eudicots
- Order: Caryophyllales
- Family: Caryophyllaceae
- Genus: Spergula
- Species: S. morisonii

Binomial name
- Spergula morisonii Boreau

= Spergula morisonii =

Species of flowering plant

Spergula morisonii, commonly known as Morison's spurry, is a species of flowering plant belonging to the family Caryophyllaceae. It is native range is Europe and northwestern Africa.
