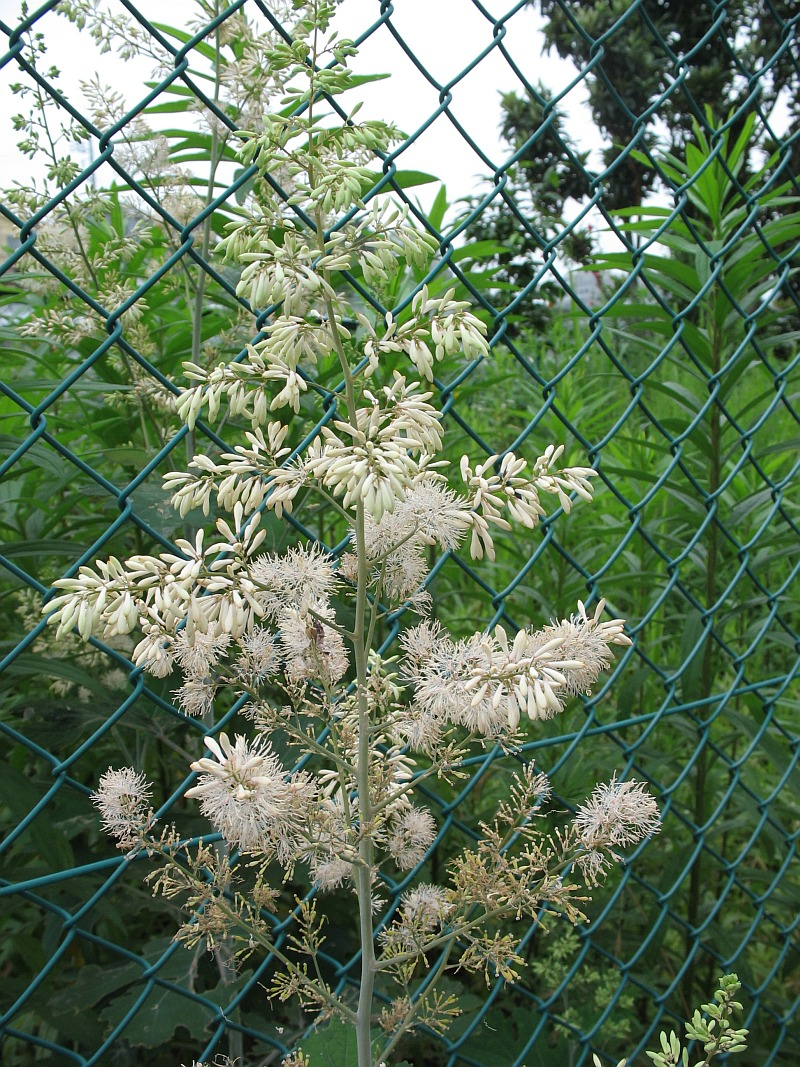

Scientific classification
- Kingdom: Plantae
- Clade: Tracheophytes
- Clade: Angiosperms
- Clade: Eudicots
- Order: Ranunculales
- Family: Papaveraceae
- Genus: Macleaya
- Species: M. cordata

Binomial name
- Macleaya cordata (Willd.) R.Br.

Synonyms
- Bocconia cordata Willd.

= Macleaya cordata =

Species of plant

Macleaya cordata, the five-seeded plume-poppy, is a species of flowering plant in the poppy family Papaveraceae, which is used ornamentally. It is native to China and Japan. It is a large herbaceous perennial growing to 2.5 m (8 ft) tall by 1 m (3 ft) or more wide, with olive green leaves and airy panicles of buff-white flowers in summer.

== Etymology ==
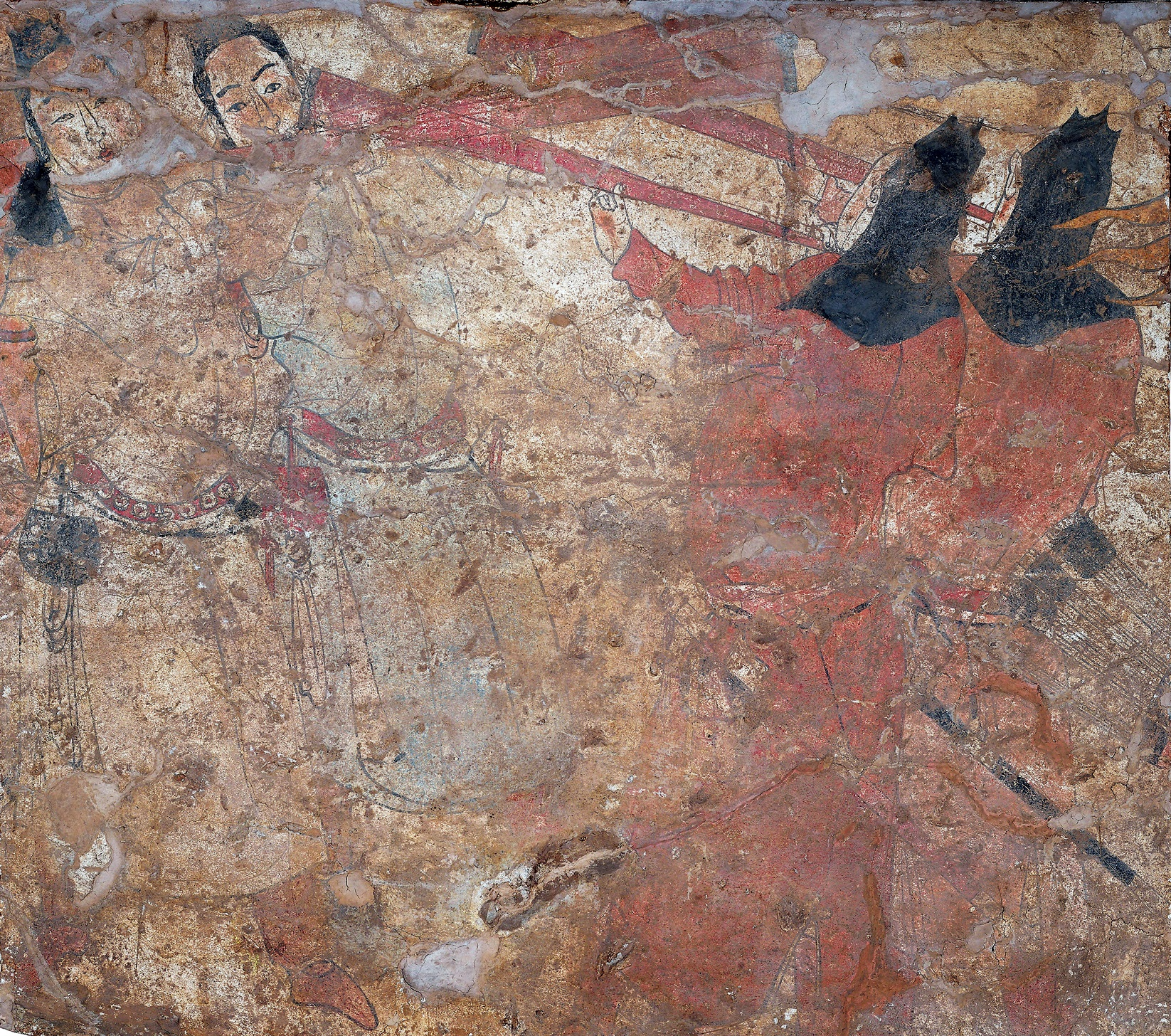
Xianbei people blowing boluohui, a kind of horn whose sound resembles that of the dried hollow stem of Macleaya cordata being blown.

The Latin cordata means "heart-shaped", referring to the leaves. The common name plume poppy is used for plants of the genus Macleaya.

The Chinese name 博落回 (bóluòhúi) is derived from 簸邏迴 (bòluóhúi), the Xianbei name for a musical instrument also known as 大角 (dà jiǎo, "big horn"), because the sound of blowing the dried (Note: The sap is very poisonous, so the fresh stem should never be blown.) hollow stem resembles the instrument sound. It is also called 號筒草 (hàotǒngcǎo, "horn herb"), 號筒桿 (hàotǒnggān, "horn stick"), or 山號筒 (shānhàotǒng, "mountain horn") in Chinese.

The Japanese name 竹似草 (takenigusa) means "bamboo-like herb", also referring to its hollow stem.

== Cultivation ==
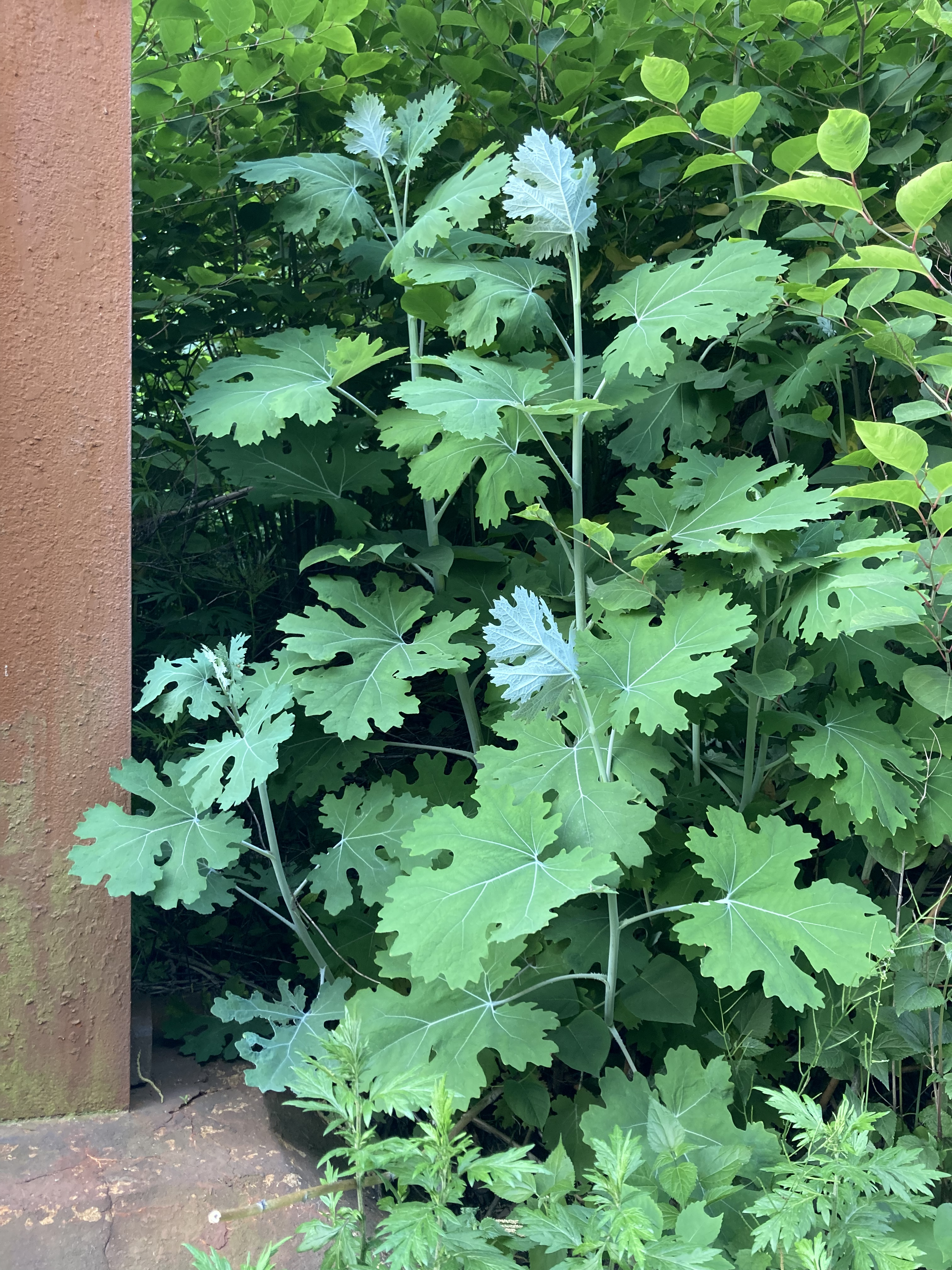
Macleaya cordata growing wild along the Cynwyd Heritage Trail.

It self-seeds readily and can be invasive, so in cultivation requires space. It is a popular subject for flower arranging. It has gained the Royal Horticultural Society's Award of Garden Merit.

Macleaya × kewensis, bred at Kew Gardens, is a hybrid of M. cordata and M. microcarpa. The cultivar 'Flamingo' has pink tinged flowers, and has also received the Award of Garden Merit.

== Other uses ==
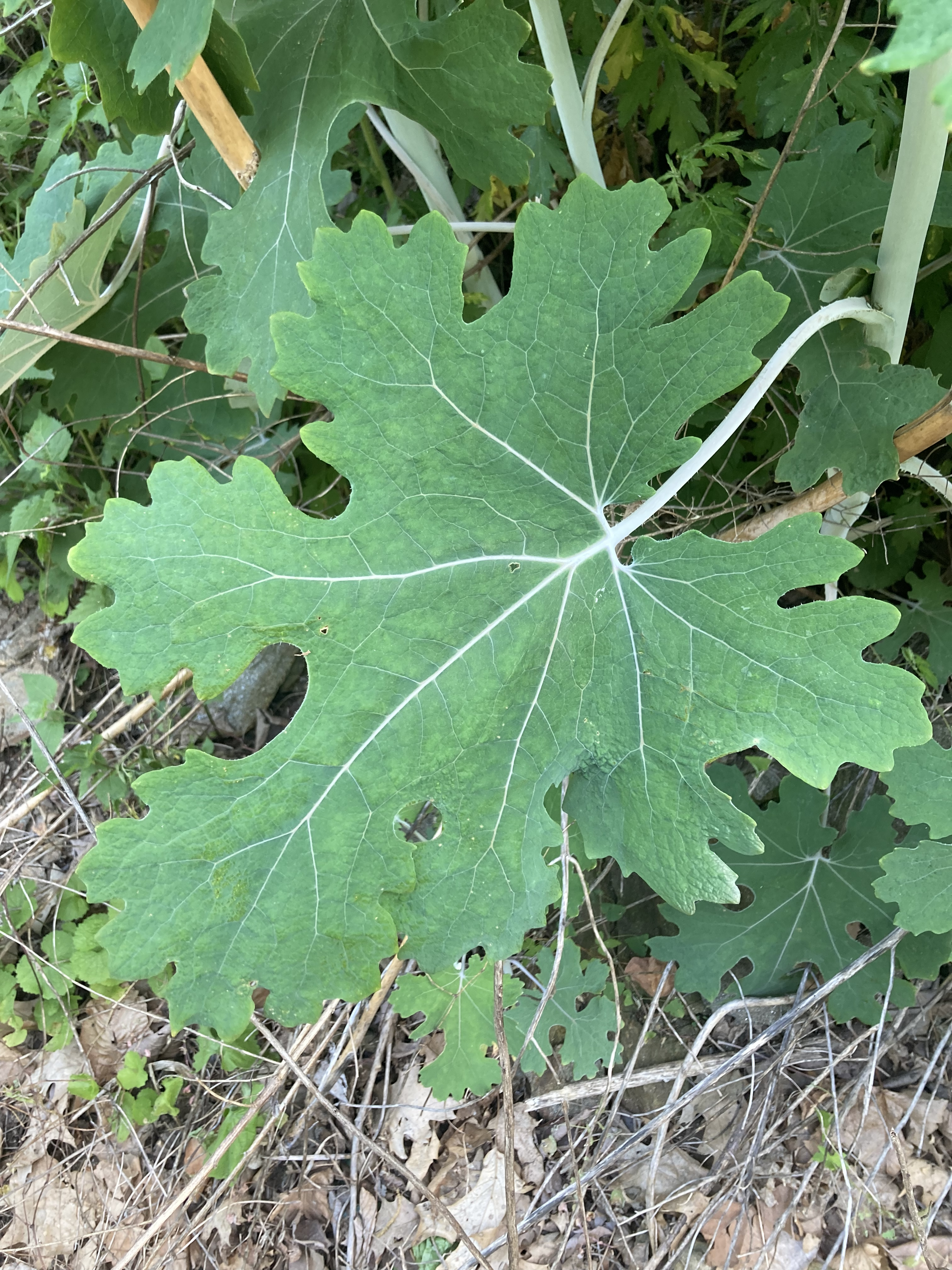
Macleaya cordata leaf.

Macleaya cordata is a source of a variety of chemical compounds, mainly isoquinoline alkaloids. The seed oil contains dihydrosanguinarine, dihydrochelerythrine, and twelve fatty acids of which linoleic, oleic, palmitic and stearic acids predominate.
