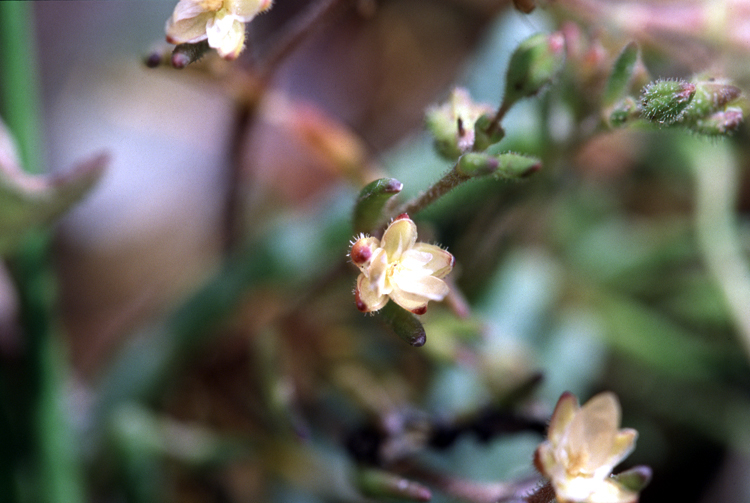

Scientific classification
- Kingdom: Plantae
- Clade: Tracheophytes
- Clade: Angiosperms
- Clade: Eudicots
- Order: Caryophyllales
- Family: Caryophyllaceae
- Genus: Spergularia
- Species: S. canadensis

Binomial name
- Spergularia canadensis (Pers.) G.Don

= Spergularia canadensis =

Species of flowering plant in the pink family

Spergularia canadensis is a species of flowering plant in the family Caryophyllaceae, known by the common name Canadian sandspurry. It is native to North America, where it is known from mainly coastal habitat. It is found along the coastline of Canada and northern parts of the United States, from Alaska to northern California on the West Coast, and as far south as New York on the East Coast.

This is a plant of wet, often saline substrates, such as beaches, salt marshes, and brackish estuaries. It is an annual herb producing a slender or thick stem up to 25 centimeters (9.8 in) long, which is lined with fleshy linear leaves up to 4.5 centimeters (1.8 in) long. Flowers occur in an inflorescence at the end of the stem, as well as in leaf axils. The small flowers have five pointed sepals, and five oval white or pink petals. The fruit is a capsule containing shiny reddish brown seeds.
