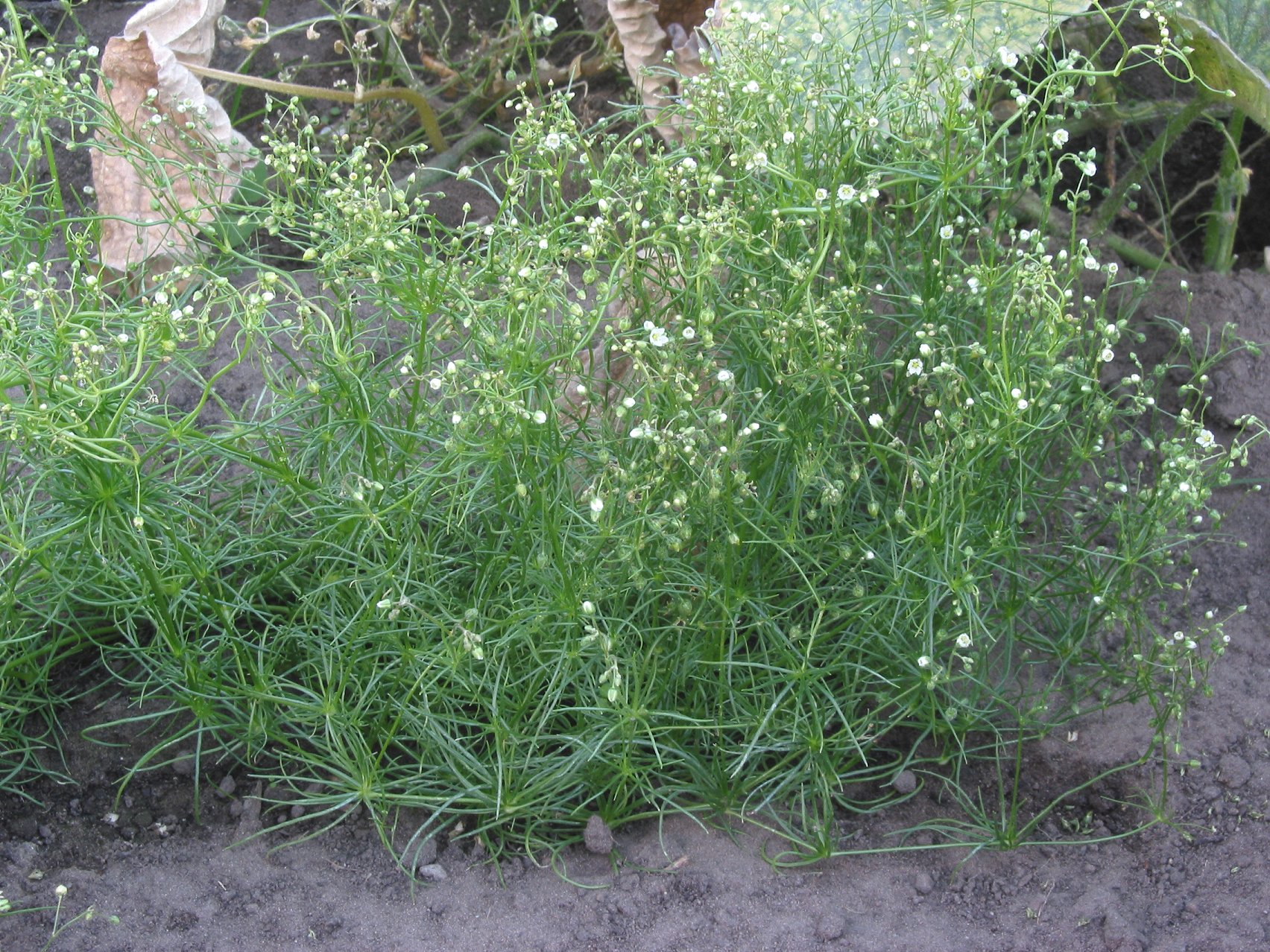

Scientific classification
- Kingdom: Plantae
- Clade: Tracheophytes
- Clade: Angiosperms
- Clade: Eudicots
- Order: Caryophyllales
- Family: Caryophyllaceae
- Genus: Spergula
- Species: S. arvensis

Binomial name
- Spergula arvensis L.

Synonyms
- Alsine arvensis (L.) Crantz; Arenaria arvensis (L.) Wallr.; Spergula arvensis var. pomeliana Maire & Weiller; Spergula arvensis var. sativa Mert. & W.D.J.Koch; Spergula arvensis subsp. sativa H.Post; Spergula nordica Büscher & G.H.Loos; Spergula sativa Boenn.; Spergularia arvensis (L.) Cambess.; Stellaria arvensis (L.) Scop.

= Spergula arvensis =

Species of flowering plant

Spergula arvensis, the corn spurry, stickwort, starwort or spurrey, is a species of plant in the genus Spergula. It is an annual plant which is native to Europe, Macaronesia, Siberia, northwestern India, northwestern Africa, and the highlands of eastern tropical Africa.

It is considered a cosmopolitan agricultural weed, and has been introduced to the Americas, Southern Africa, and parts of Asia.

== Description ==
Corn spurry is a summer or winter annual broadleaf plant, and its seeds buried in the soil can survive for several years. The leaves contain a compound called oxalate that can be toxic if eaten in large quantities by livestock.

=== Flower ===
Perfect flower with 5 white tiny petals and 5 green sepals slightly offset from petals. There are also 10 yellow stamens about 1 cm in diameter.

== Subspecies ==
Three subspecies are accepted.

- Spergula arvensis subsp. arvensis – entire native and introduced range
- Spergula arvensis subsp. chieusseana (Pomel) Briq. – Portugal, Spain, Corsica, Sardinia, Sicily, and northwestern Africa (Algeria, Morocco, and Tunisia)
- Spergula arvensis subsp. gracilis (E.Petit) Briq. – Corsica

Spergula arvensis var. arvensis and S. arvensis var. sativa are the distinct variants that have been found in the UK, with the chromosome number: 2n = 18.

== Habitats ==
Roadsides, farmland, sand dunes, and coniferous woodland. A kind of plant, which can be found in almost all over the world, including Britain.

== Reproduction ==
Corn spurry can be reproduced by the following ways:

- Free spread of the weed – Because of the high seed yield rate of corn spurry, it can produce 10–40 fruits (capsules) per plant, and each capsule produces about 20 seeds in summer and autumn. It also produces seeds while flowering, that is, the upper part of the same plant is still blooming, and the lower part of the mature seeds have dropped. Corn spurry has small, lightweight seeds that can be spread by the wind and cover adjacent land the next year.
- Ruminants spread – It can also be transmitted in the excrement of ruminants. Mature seeds cannot be digested in the stomach of the animals, and they can continue to germinate and grow after they are expelled in excrement. Therefore, although some suitable habitats are far away, they can be transmitted and reproduced through the livestock trade.

== Prevention and control ==
=== Prevention ===
It takes less time and money to prevent crops from corn spurry than it does to control corn interference. When planting in a new area, you should plant registered seeds. Ensure that infected areas are well cleaned to ensure that seeds are not transferred.

=== Cultural control ===
Corn spurries do not germinate in very deep soil, thus, conventional planting methods can bury some of them. Experimental studies have shown that the germination rate decreases as the depth of seeds buried in the soil increases. However, being buried increases the life span of the seeds, which means that they end up on the surface of the soil as a result of cultivation. Therefore, once the ideal soil and weather conditions are achieved, plant high-yield crops in the field as soon as possible, with narrower rows and higher number of plants between the crops.

=== Physical control ===
Before sowing the seeds of the crops, some mechanical methods can be carried out, such as hand hoeing, ploughing, grazing and so on.

=== Chemical control ===
Chemicals can be applied to control corn spurry, but this variety is resistant to many kinds of herbicides.

=== Biological control ===
It is known that few insects and pathogens can attack corn spurry, while an arbuscular-mycorrhizal fungal inoculum has been shown to be effective in reducing the biomass of weeds.

== In culture ==
It is the county flower of Montgomeryshire in the United Kingdom.
