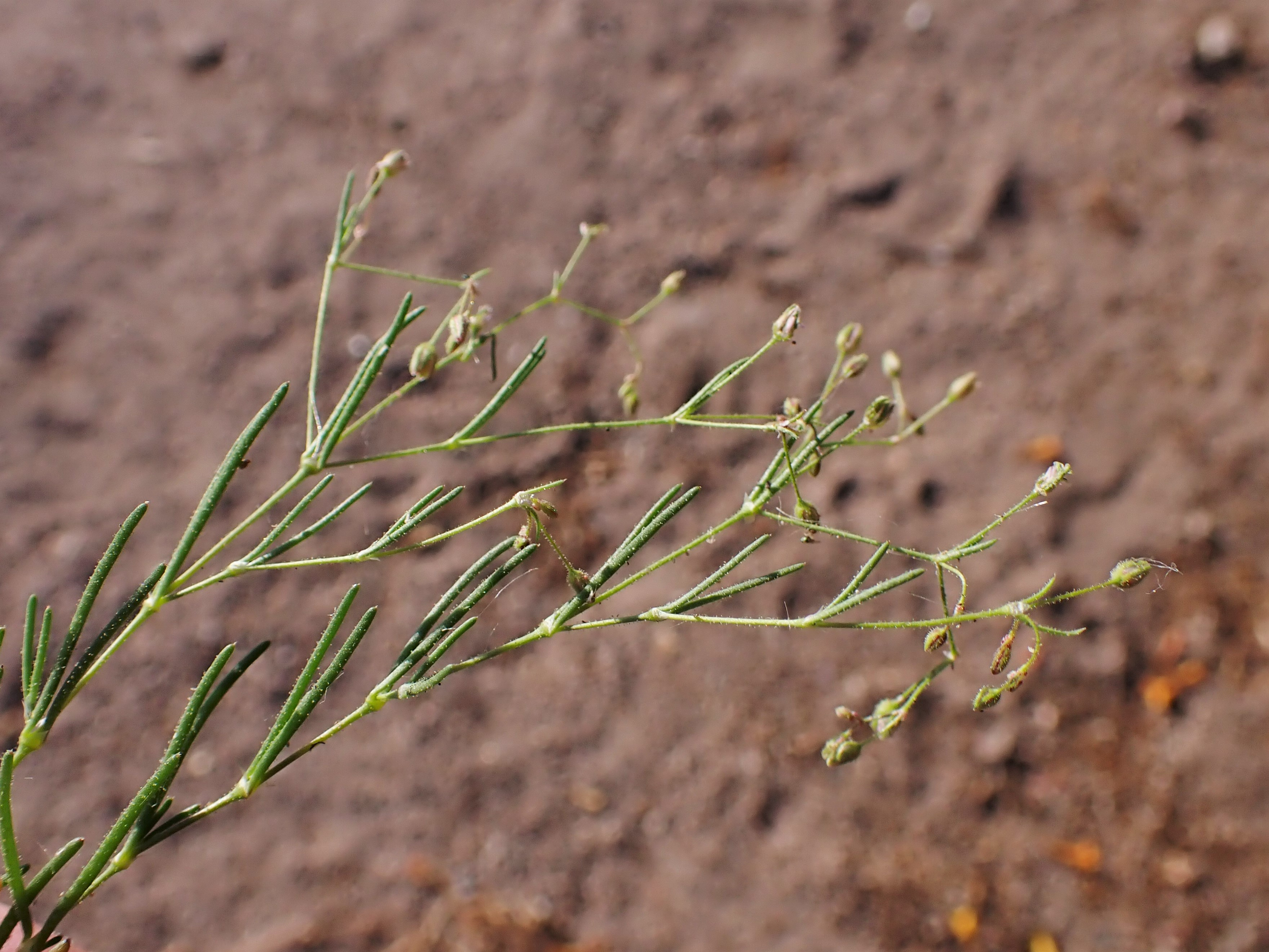

Scientific classification
- Kingdom: Plantae
- Clade: Tracheophytes
- Clade: Angiosperms
- Clade: Eudicots
- Order: Caryophyllales
- Family: Caryophyllaceae
- Genus: Spergularia
- Species: S. diandra

Binomial name
- Spergularia diandra (Guss.) Heldr.

Synonyms
- Spergularia salsuginea

= Spergularia diandra =

Species of plant

Spergularia diandra, the alkali sandspurry, is a species of annual herb in the family Caryophyllaceae (carpetweeds). They have a self-supporting growth form and simple, broad leaves. Individuals can grow to 4.4 cm.

== Sources ==
This article incorporates text from a free content work. Licensed under CC0 (license statement/permission). Text taken from Spergularia diandra. Encyclopedia of Life.
