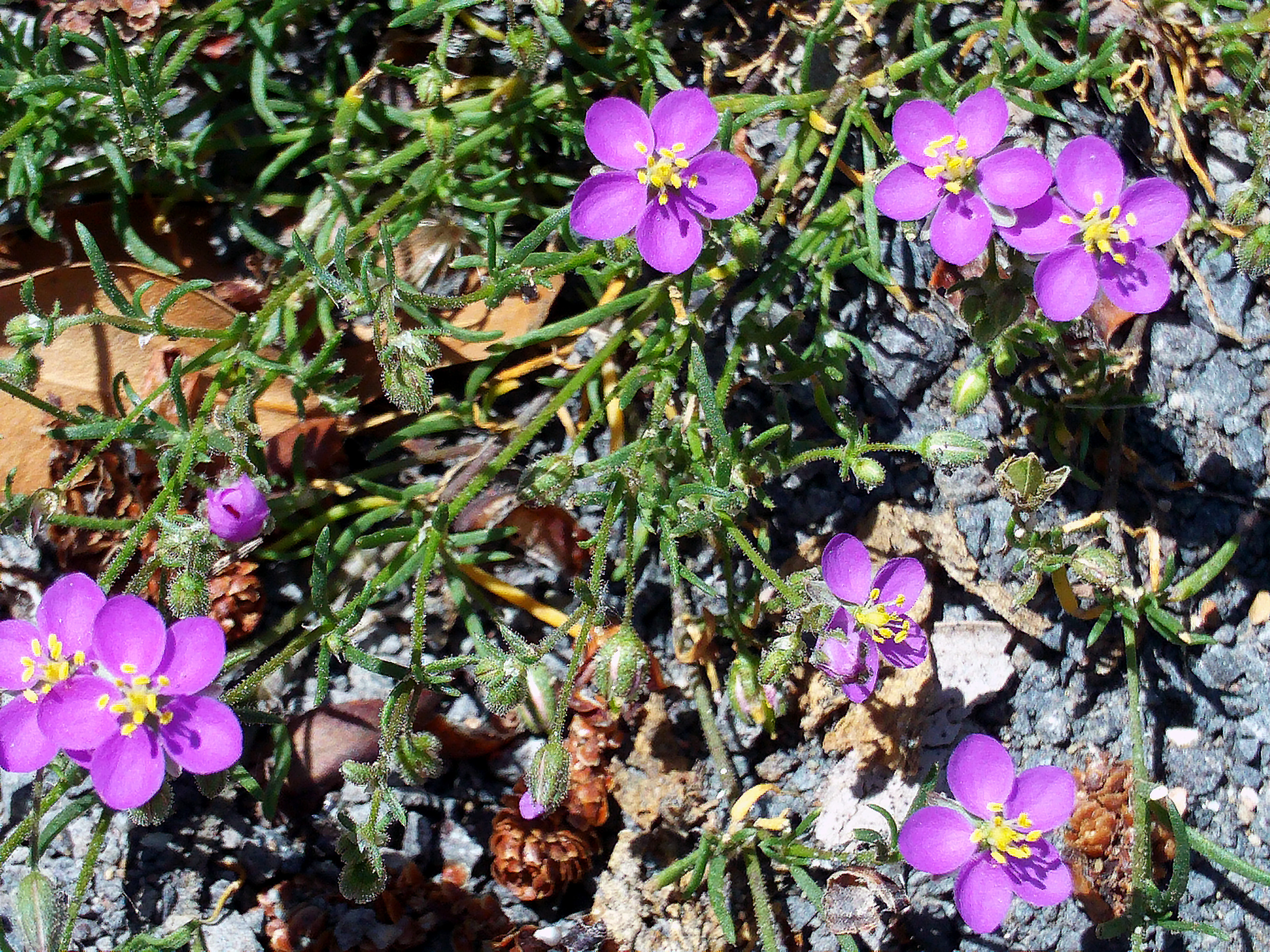

Scientific classification
- Kingdom: Plantae
- Clade: Tracheophytes
- Clade: Angiosperms
- Clade: Eudicots
- Order: Caryophyllales
- Family: Caryophyllaceae
- Genus: Spergularia
- Species: S. rubra

Binomial name
- Spergularia rubra (L.) C. Presl

= Spergularia rubra =

Species of flowering plant in the pink family

Spergularia rubra, the red sandspurry or red sand-spurrey, is a plant species in the family Caryophyllaceae. It is native to Europe, Asia and North Africa, and it is present on other continents, including North and South America and Australia, as an introduced species and in many areas a common weed. It grows in a wide variety of habitat types.

It is an annual or perennial herb producing a slender, glandular stem up to about 25 centimeters (9.8 in) long. It is lined with slightly fleshy linear or threadlike leaves each under 2 centimeters long. The leaves may be tipped with hard points or spines, and they are accompanied by shiny white lance-shaped stipules. Flowers occur in the leaf axils and at the tips of the stems. They have hairy, glandular sepals and five round-oval pink petals.
