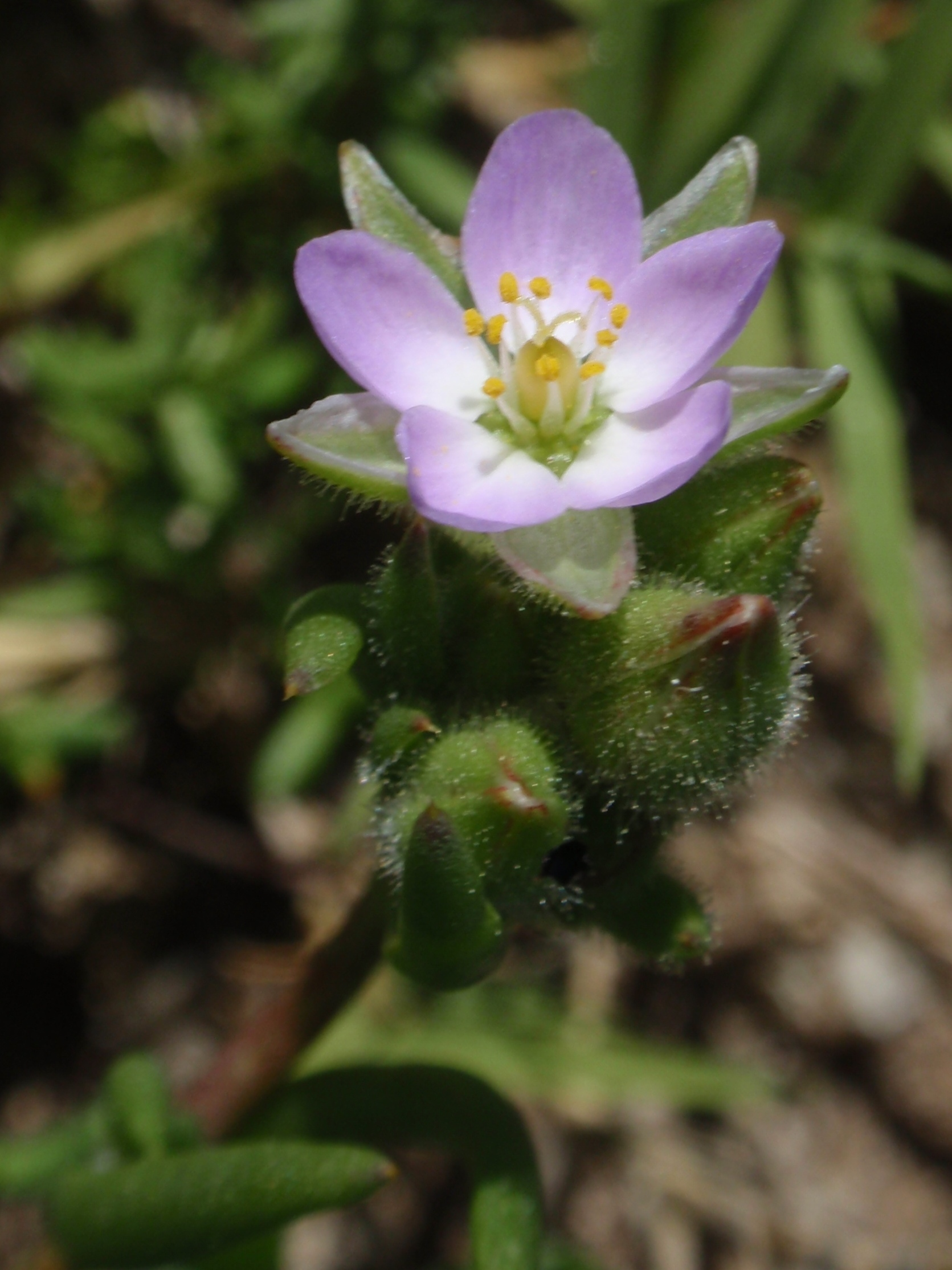

Scientific classification
- Kingdom: Plantae
- Clade: Tracheophytes
- Clade: Angiosperms
- Clade: Eudicots
- Order: Caryophyllales
- Family: Caryophyllaceae
- Genus: Spergularia
- Species: S. macrotheca

Binomial name
- Spergularia macrotheca (Hornem.) Heynh.

= Spergularia macrotheca =

Species of flowering plant in the pink family

Spergularia macrotheca is a species of flowering plant in the family Caryophyllaceae known by the common name sticky sandspurry. It is native to western North America from British Columbia to Baja California, where it grows in many types of moist coastal and inland habitat, often in alkaline and saline substrates. It may be found in marshes, alkali flats, beaches, meadows, seeps, and vernal pools. It is a perennial herb producing a narrow stem up to 40 centimeters (16 in) long with a woody, thickened base and taproot. They may grow erect or prostrate across the ground. It is covered in sticky glandular hairs, especially in the inflorescence. The stems are lined with fleshy linear leaves, sometimes tipped with spines. The leaves are accompanied by triangular stipules up to a centimeter long each. Flowers occur in clusters at the end of the stem as well as in leaf axils. The small flowers have five pointed sepals and five oval white to lavender-pink petals. The fruit is a capsule containing tiny reddish brown, winged seeds.
