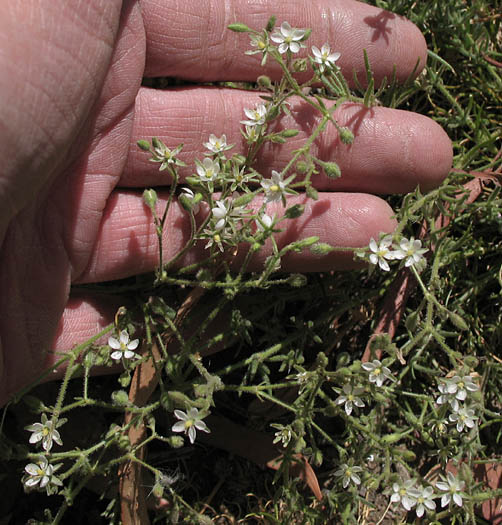

Scientific classification
- Kingdom: Plantae
- Clade: Tracheophytes
- Clade: Angiosperms
- Clade: Eudicots
- Order: Caryophyllales
- Family: Caryophyllaceae
- Genus: Spergularia
- Species: S. villosa

Binomial name
- Spergularia villosa (Pers.) Camb.

= Spergularia villosa =

Species of flowering plant in the pink family

Spergularia villosa is a species of flowering plant in the family Caryophyllaceae known by the common name hairy sandspurry. It is native to southern South America, and it is known in the southwestern United States and Baja California as an introduced species and casual weed. It grows in a wide variety of habitat types. It is a small perennial herb producing a sprawling stem up to 30 centimeters (12 in) long with a woody base. It is coated in glandular hairs. The leaves are generally linear in shape and measure a few centimeters long. They are accompanied by dull white lance-shaped stipules. The flowers have hairy, glandular sepals and five oval whitish petals.
