= Robert Morison =

British botanist (1620–1683)

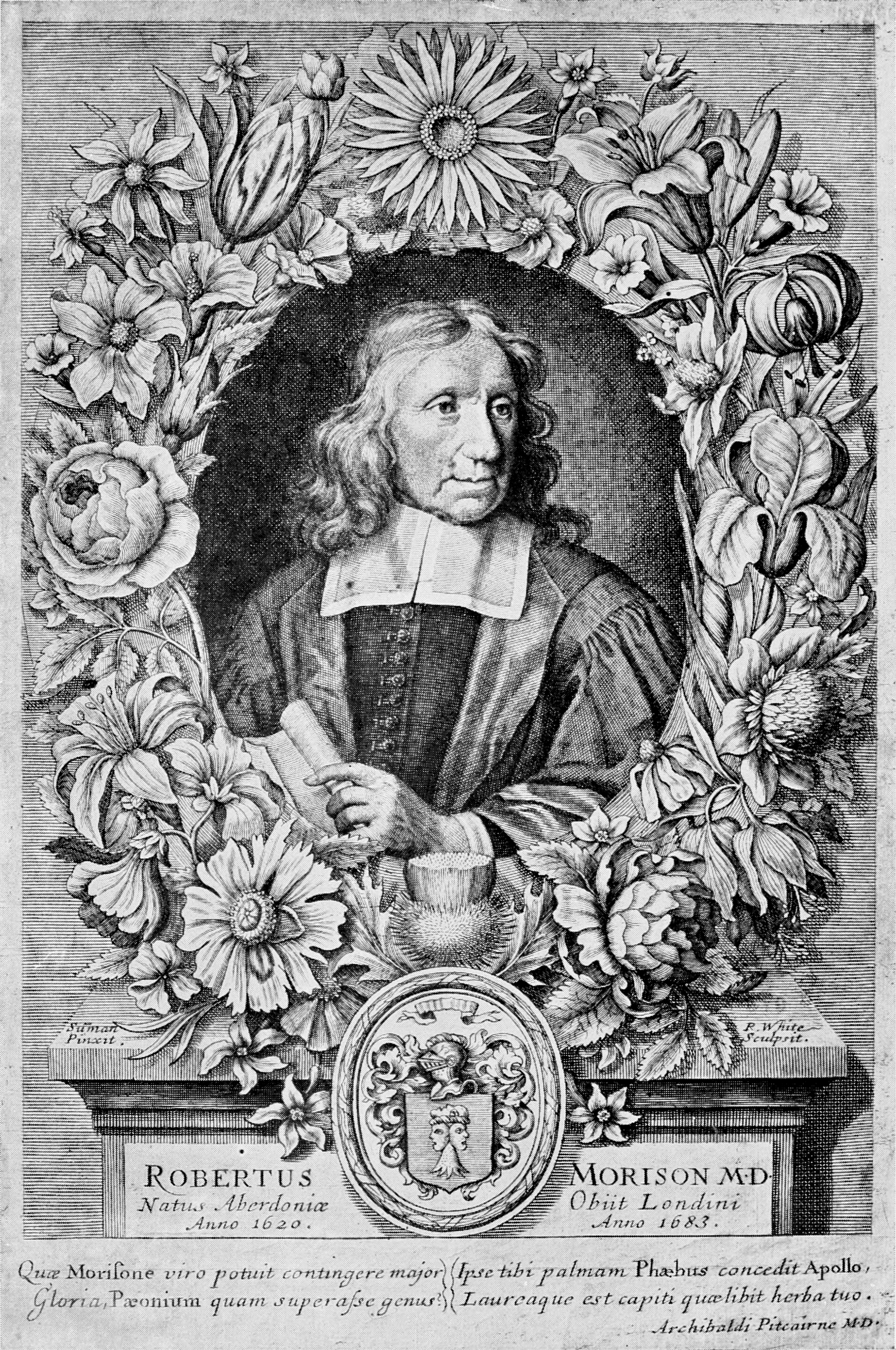
- Born: 1620; Aberdeen, Scotland
- Died: 10 November 1683 (aged 63); London, England
- Education: Aberdeen University; University of Angers, France
- Scientific career
- Fields: Botany; taxonomy
- Workplaces: Oxford University
- Author abbrev. (botany): Morison

Robert Morison (1620 – 10 November 1683) was a Scottish botanist and taxonomist. A forerunner of John Ray, he elucidated and developed the first systematic classification of plants.

== Biography ==
Born in Aberdeen, Morison was an outstanding scholar who gained his Master of Arts degree from the University of Aberdeen at the age of eighteen. During the English Civil War he joined the Charles I of England's Cavaliers and was seriously wounded at the 1639 Battle of the Bridge of Dee during the Civil War. On recovering, he fled to France when it became apparent that the cause was lost.

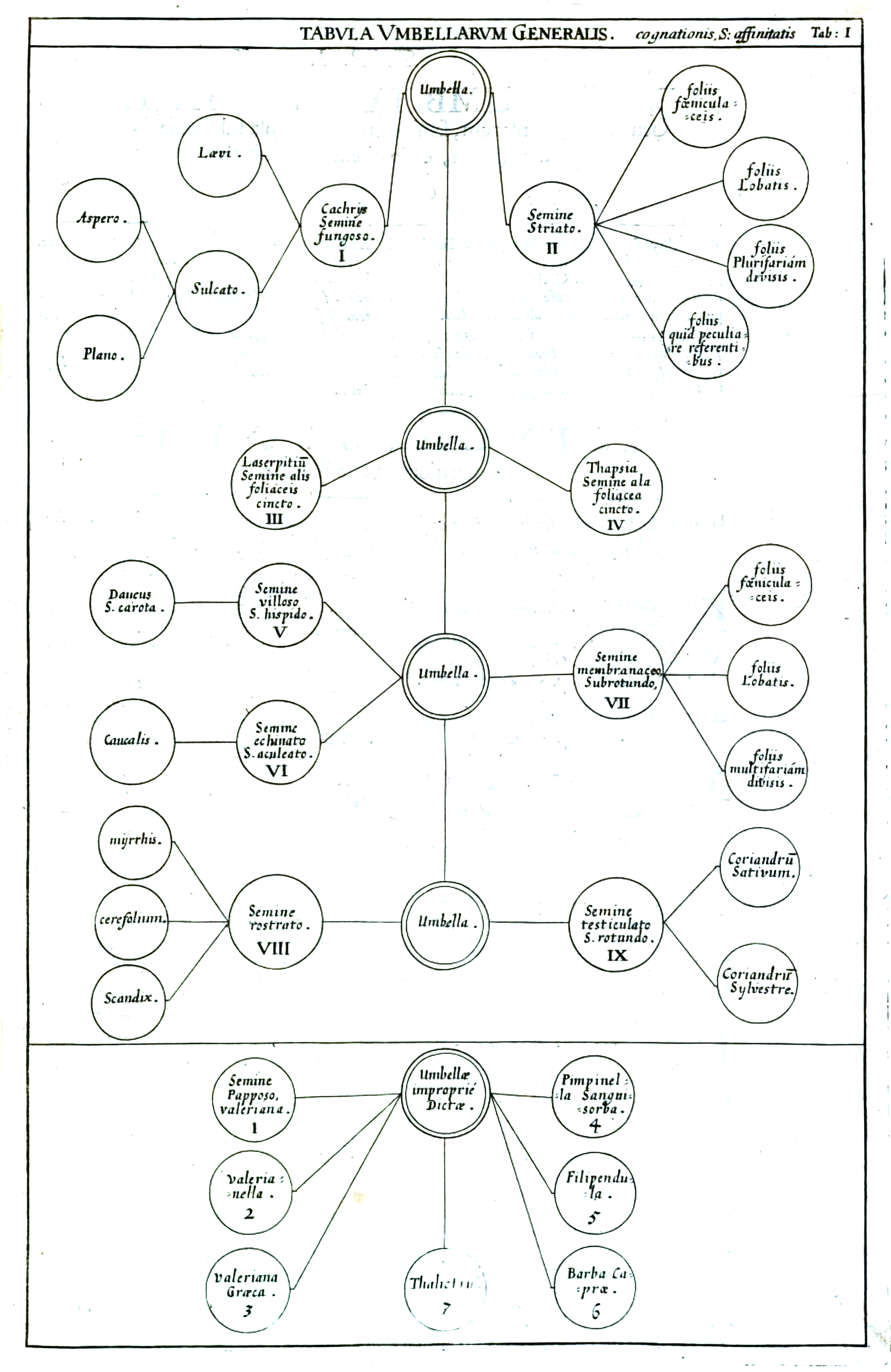
A diagram from Morison's 1672 book on Umbelliferae illustrating genus affinities

In 1648, he took a doctorate in medicine at the University of Angers in Western France and from then on devoted himself entirely to the study of botany. He studied in Paris under the guidance of Vespasien Robin, botanist to the king of France, who introduced him to Gaston, Duke of Orléans. On Robin's recommendation, Morison became director of the Royal Gardens at Blois, Central France, a post which he subsequently held for ten years.

In 1660, despite inducements to make him stay in France, Morison returned to England following the Restoration and became physician to Charles II as well as his botanist and superintendent of all the royal gardens with a salary of £200 per annum, and a free house.

Earlier in 1621, Henry Danvers, 1st Earl of Danby had given Oxford University 250 pounds for the purchase of land for a "Physic Garden". At the same time, the earl bequeathed "certain revenues" to fund a chair in botany at the university; in 1669 Morison became the first professor of botany, a post that he held until 1683.

In the year that he began teaching at Oxford, Morison published Praeludia Botanica, a work which stressed using the structure of a plant's fruits for classification. At the time, classification focused on the habitat and medicinal properties of the plant and Morison's criticism of systems promoted by botanists such as Jean and Gaspard Bauhin caused some anger among his contemporaries.

In 1669, he also published 'Hortus Regius Blesensis' by the newly revived University Press, it was a catalogue of the Blois garden to which Morison added the description of 260 previously un-described plants, although Richard Pulteney (A General View of the Writings of Linnaeus, 1781) disagreed and noted that they were only varieties and others were already described.

In the preface to his Plantarum Umbelliferarum Distributio Nova (1672), Morison gave a definitive statement of the principles of his method and was the first person to write a "monograph of a specific group of plants", the Umbelliferae.

Morison was fatally injured by the pole of a carriage as he was crossing the street on 9 November 1683 and died the following day at his house in Green Street, Leicester-fields. He was buried in the church of St Martin-in-the-Fields, Westminster.

== Works ==
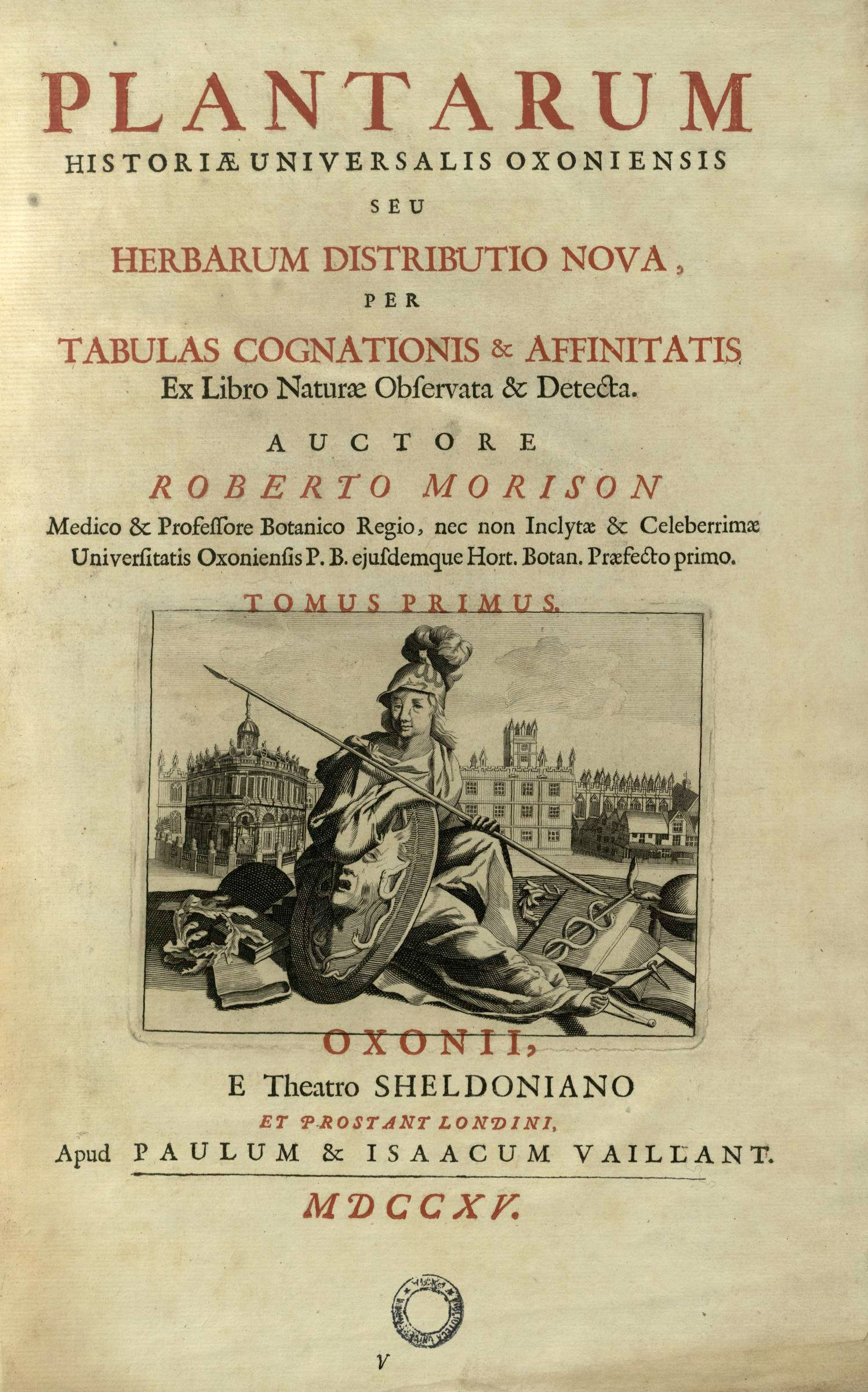
Historia plantarum universalis oxoniensis, 1715

- Praeludia Botanica, p. PP7, at Google Books (1669) An octavo volume made up of:
  - pp. 1–347: Hortus Regius Blesensis Auctus (a new edition of Abel Brunier's Hortus Regius Blesensis with Morison's contributions).
  - pp. 351–459: Hallucinationes Caspari Bauhini in Pinace, item Animadversiones in tres Tomos Universalis Historiae Johannis Bauhini.
  - pp. 463–499: Dialogus inter Socium Collegii Regii Gresham dicti et Botanographum Regium.
- Plantarum Umbelliferarum Distributio Nova, per Tabulas Cognationis et Affinitatis, ex Libra Naturae observata et detecta (1672).
- Historia Plantarum Universalis Oxoniensis (Vol. 1, 1680)
- Historia plantarum universalis oxoniensis (in Latin). Vol. 1. Oxford: Theatrum Sheldonianum. 1715.
- Historia plantarum universalis oxoniensis (in Latin). Vol. 2. Oxford: Theatrum Sheldonianum. 1715.

== Legacy ==
- At the time of his death, Morison's opus magnum the Historia Plantarum Universalis Oxoniensis remained unfinished, with only one volume published in 1680 detailing fifteen classes of his classification system. He had collaborated on this volume with Charles Hatton. It was entrusted by Oxford University to Jacob Bobart the Younger, who on the death of his father Jacob Bobart the Elder published a second and final instalment of the Historia in 1699 dealing with the remaining ten sections of herbaceous plants.
- Around 1737, in a letter to Swiss naturalist Albrecht von Haller, Carl Linnaeus wrote:

Morison was vain, yet he cannot be sufficiently praised for having revived [a] system which was half expiring. If you look through Tournefort's genera you will readily admit how much he owes to Morison, full as much as the latter was indebted to Cesalpino, though Tournefort himself was a conscientious investigator. All that is good in Morison is taken from Cesalpino, from whose guidance he wanders in pursuit of natural affinities rather than of characters.

== Bibliography ==
- Vines, Sydney Howard (1913). "Robert Morison 1620—1683 and John Ray 1627—1705" . In Oliver, Francis Wall (ed.). Makers of British botany . Cambridge University Press – via Wikisource.
- Morison, Robert (1672). Plantarum Umbelliferarum Distributio nova.
