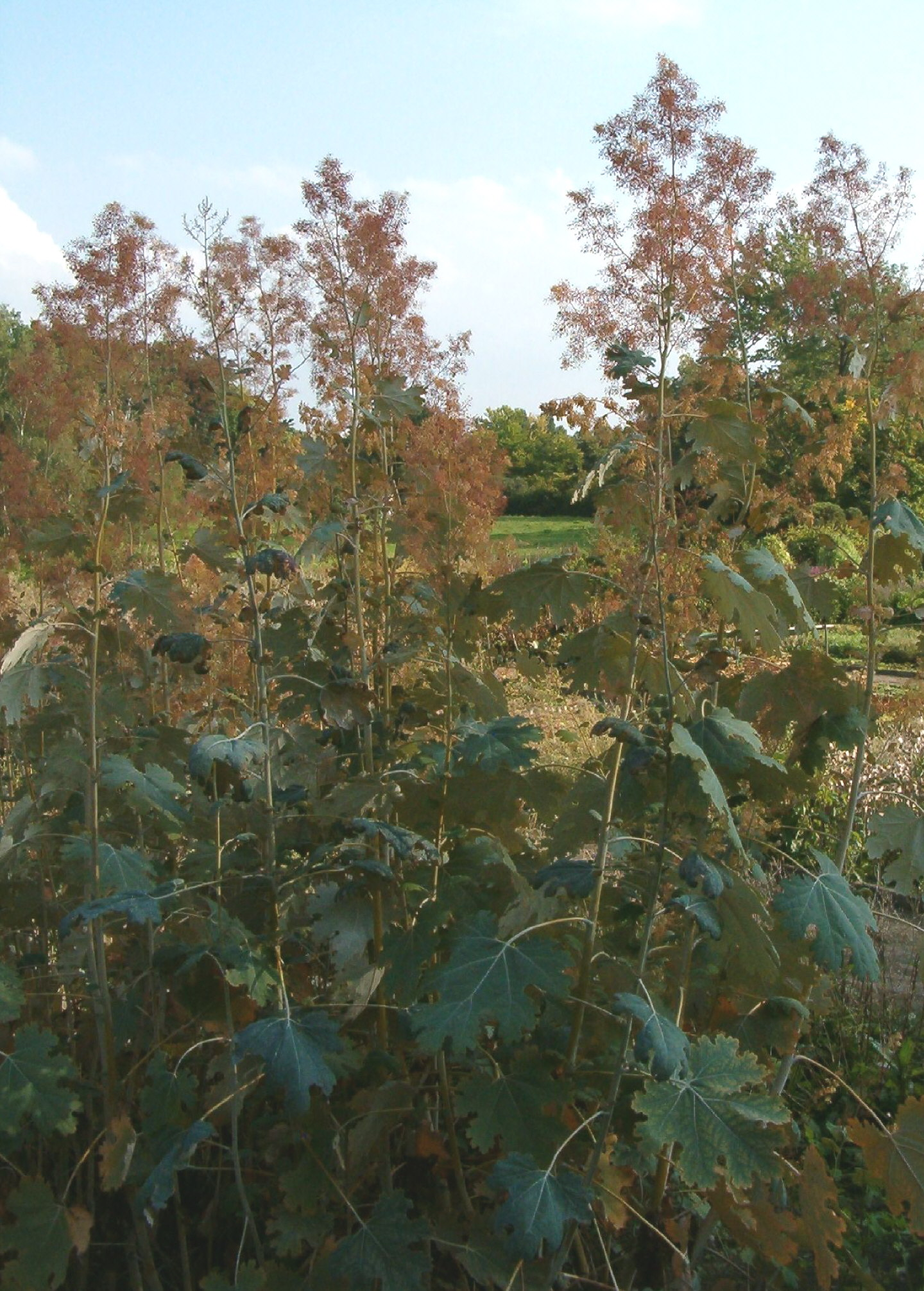
- M. microcarpa, Berlin Botanical Garden

Scientific classification
- Kingdom: Plantae
- Clade: Tracheophytes
- Clade: Angiosperms
- Clade: Eudicots
- Order: Ranunculales
- Family: Papaveraceae
- Genus: Macleaya
- Species: M. microcarpa

Binomial name
- Macleaya microcarpa (Maxim.) Fedde

Synonyms
- Bocconia microcarpa Maxim.

= Macleaya microcarpa =

Species of flowering plant

Macleaya microcarpa is a species of flowering plant in the poppy family, Papaveraceae. It is a vigorous, substantial herbaceous perennial growing to 2 m (7 ft) tall by 1 m (3 ft) or more wide, with grey-green felted leaves and loose panicles of buff flowers in midsummer.

== Etymology ==
The name Macleaya commemorates Alexander Macleay (1767-1848), a Scottish/Australian entomologist. The specific epithet microcarpa means "small fruit". Plants of the genus Macleaya are commonly called plume poppies.

== Cultivation ==
Macleaya microcarpa is an imposing architectural plant which self-seeds readily, and may become a nuisance in a garden setting. It is popular as a subject for flower arranging. The cultivar 'Kelway's Coral Plume', with pink-tinged flowers, has gained the Royal Horticultural Society's Award of Garden Merit.
