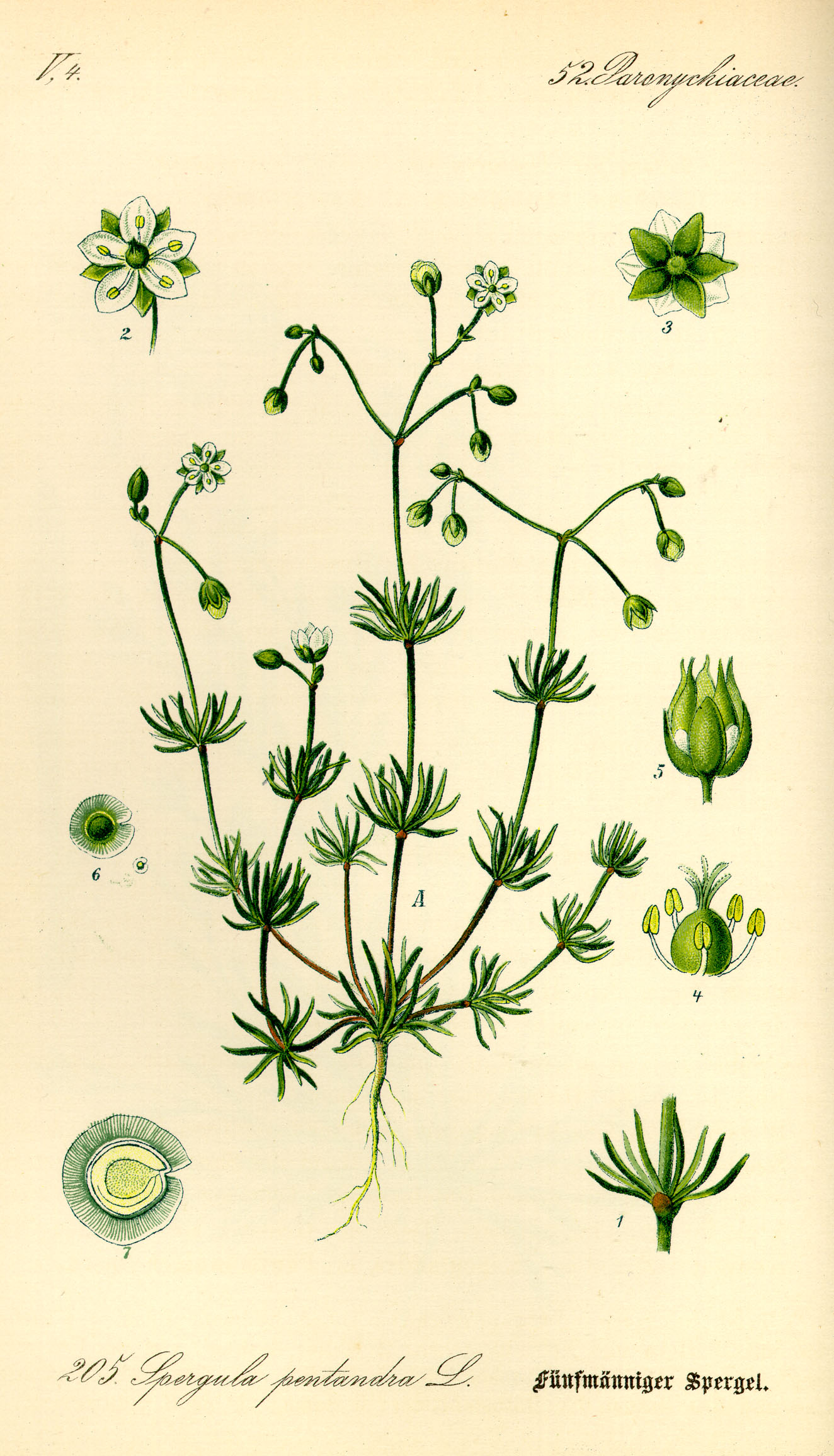
- Spergula pentandra

Scientific classification
- Kingdom: Plantae
- Clade: Tracheophytes
- Clade: Angiosperms
- Clade: Eudicots
- Order: Caryophyllales
- Family: Caryophyllaceae
- Genus: Spergula; Dill. ex L.

Synonyms
- Alsinella Hornem. (1827), nom. illeg.; Balardia Cambess. (1830); Buda Adans. (1763); Corion Mitch. (1769); Delia Dumort. (1827); Fasciculus Dulac (1867); Hymenogonium Rich. ex Lebel (1869); Lepigonum Wahlenb. (1820); Melargyra Raf. (1837); Segetella Desv. (1816); Tissa Adans. (1763)

= Spergula =

Spurrey

Genus of flowering plants

Spergula is a genus of flowering plants in the family Caryophyllaceae. Their usual English name is spurry or spurrey. It includes 10 species native to portions of South America, Africa, and Eurasia. They are commonly found in grassland.

== Species ==
10 species are accepted.

- Spergula arvensis L.
- Spergula calva Pedersen
- Spergula cerviana (Cham. & Schltdl.) D.Dietr.
- Spergula grandis Pers.
- Spergula morisonii Boreau – Morison's spurry
- Spergula pentandra L.
- Spergula rosea Blatt
- Spergula segetalis (L.) Vill.
- Spergula tangerina (P.Monnier) G.López
- Spergula viscosa Lag.
