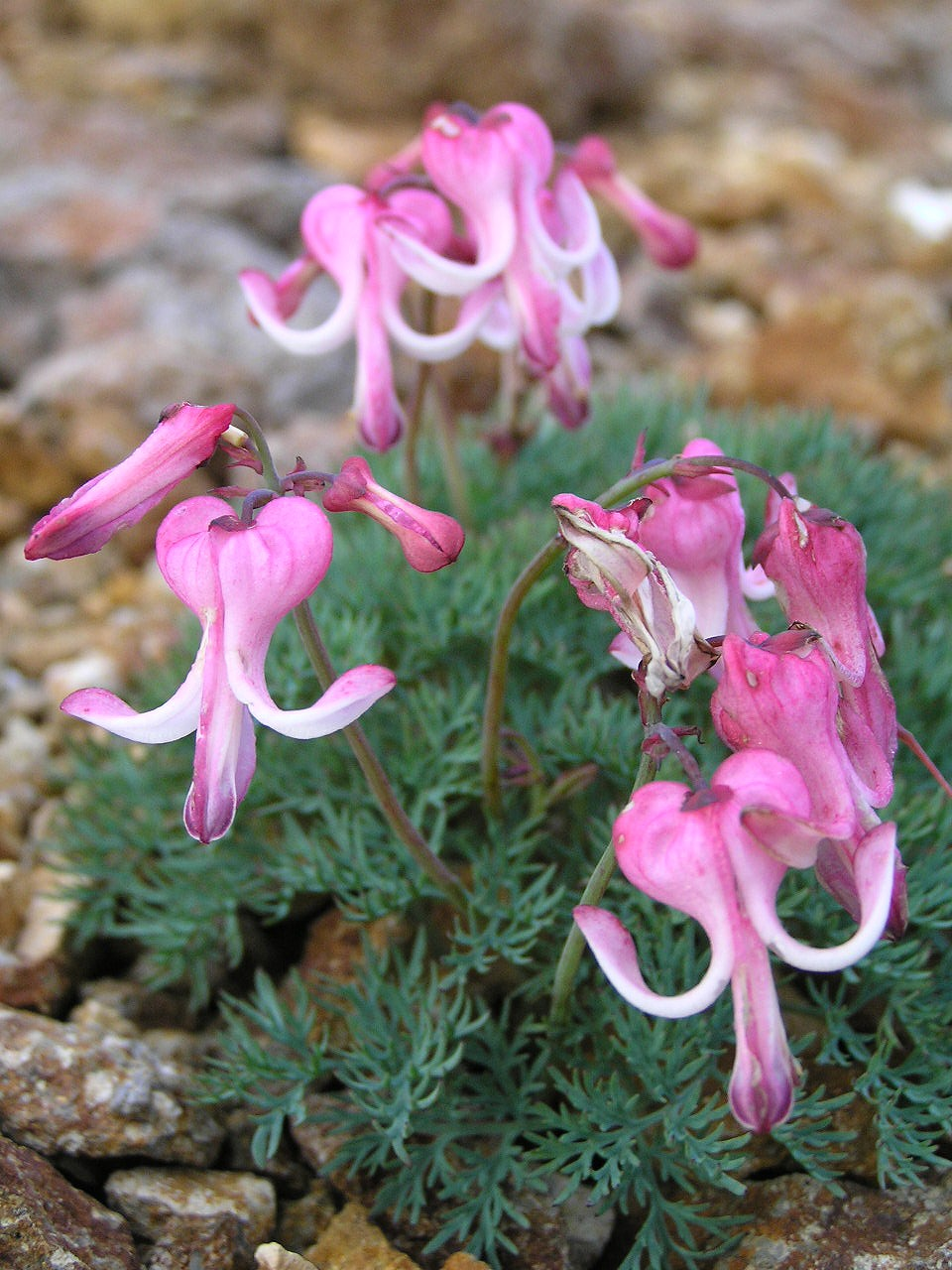

Scientific classification
- Kingdom: Plantae
- Clade: Embryophytes
- Clade: Tracheophytes
- Clade: Angiosperms
- Clade: Eudicots
- Order: Ranunculales
- Family: Papaveraceae
- Genus: Dicentra
- Species: D. peregrina

Binomial name
- Dicentra peregrina (Rudolph) Makino

= Dicentra peregrina =

Species of flowering plant in the poppy family

Dicentra peregrina (Japanese: コマクサ, komakusa) is a herbaceous perennial growing from a rhizome, native to mountains in Japan and nearby areas of East Asia.

== Etymology ==
The species name peregrina is Latin for "exotic, alien, foreign, strange, from foreign lands", possibly because the species is the only one of its genus outside of North America.

In Japanese, the plant (kusa) is named for its flower buds, which are said to resemble the head of a horse (koma).

== Description ==
Leaves are gray-green, glaucous, and deeply cut, with linear lobes.

Flowers have four rose-purple, pink, cream, pale yellow, or white petals and two tiny sepals. Outer petals are pouched at the base and strongly bent back at the ends. Inner petals are long and protruding, connected at the end.

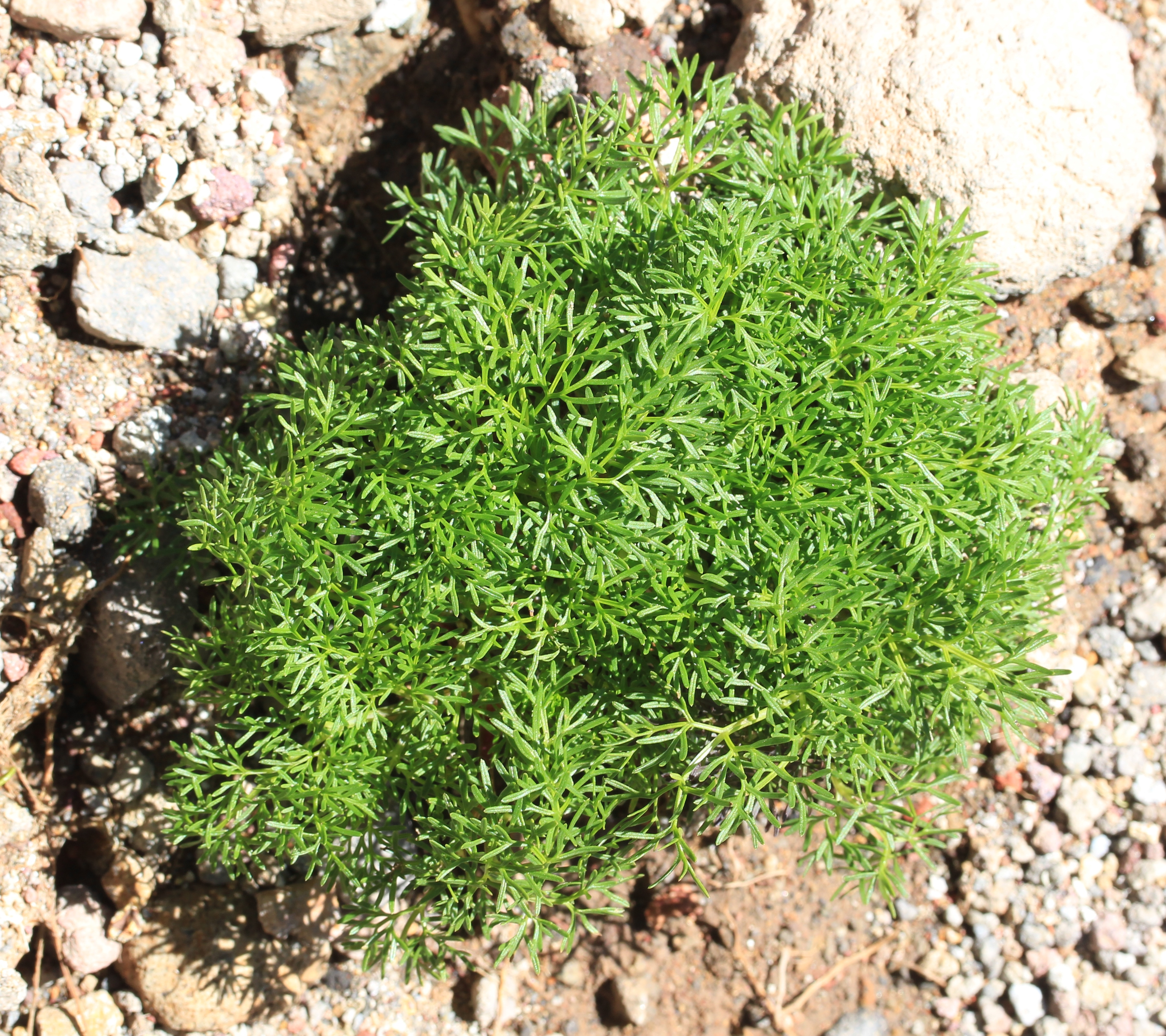
A plant in early spring before flowering on Mount Ontake

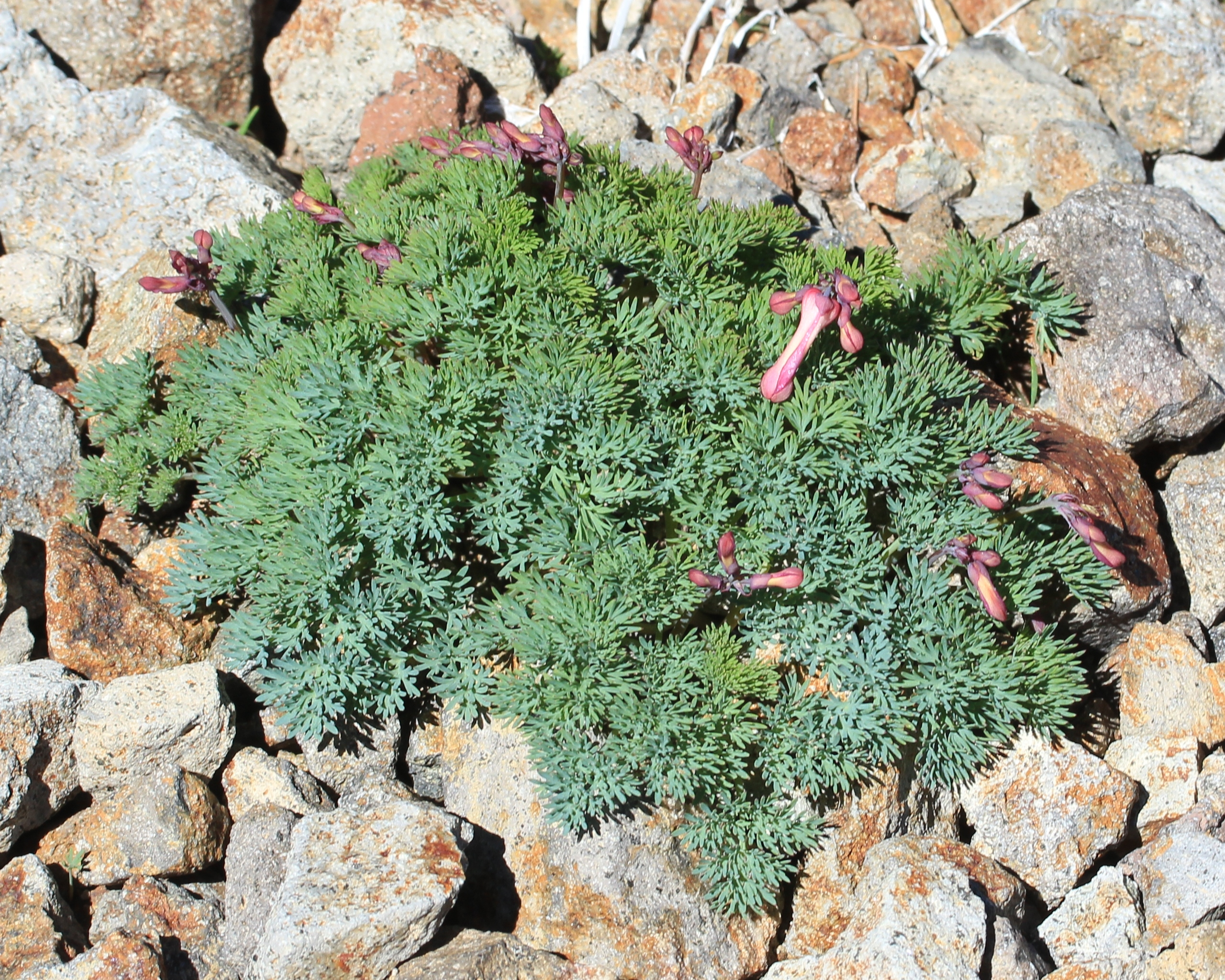
A plant in bud

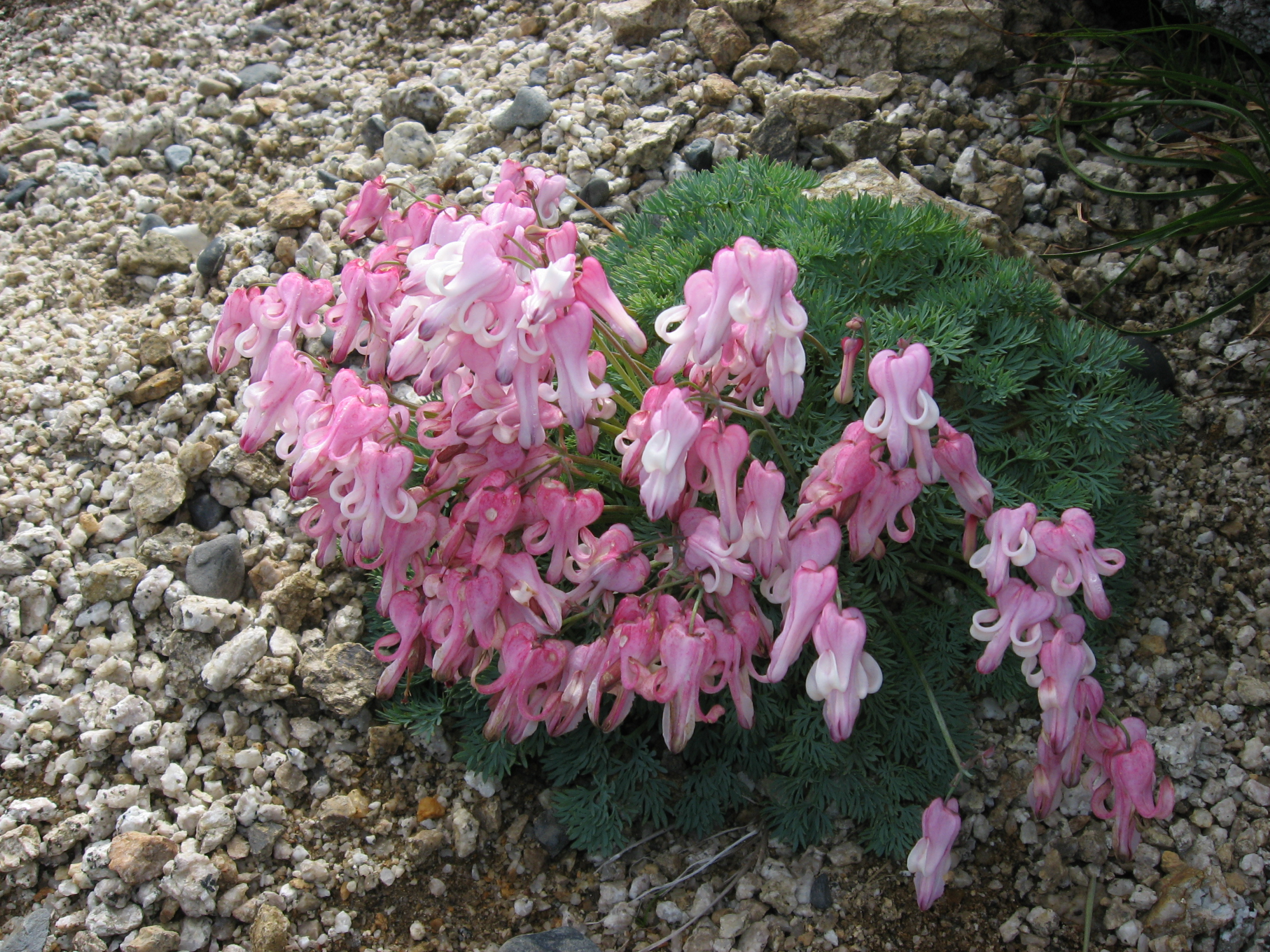
A plant with many flowers

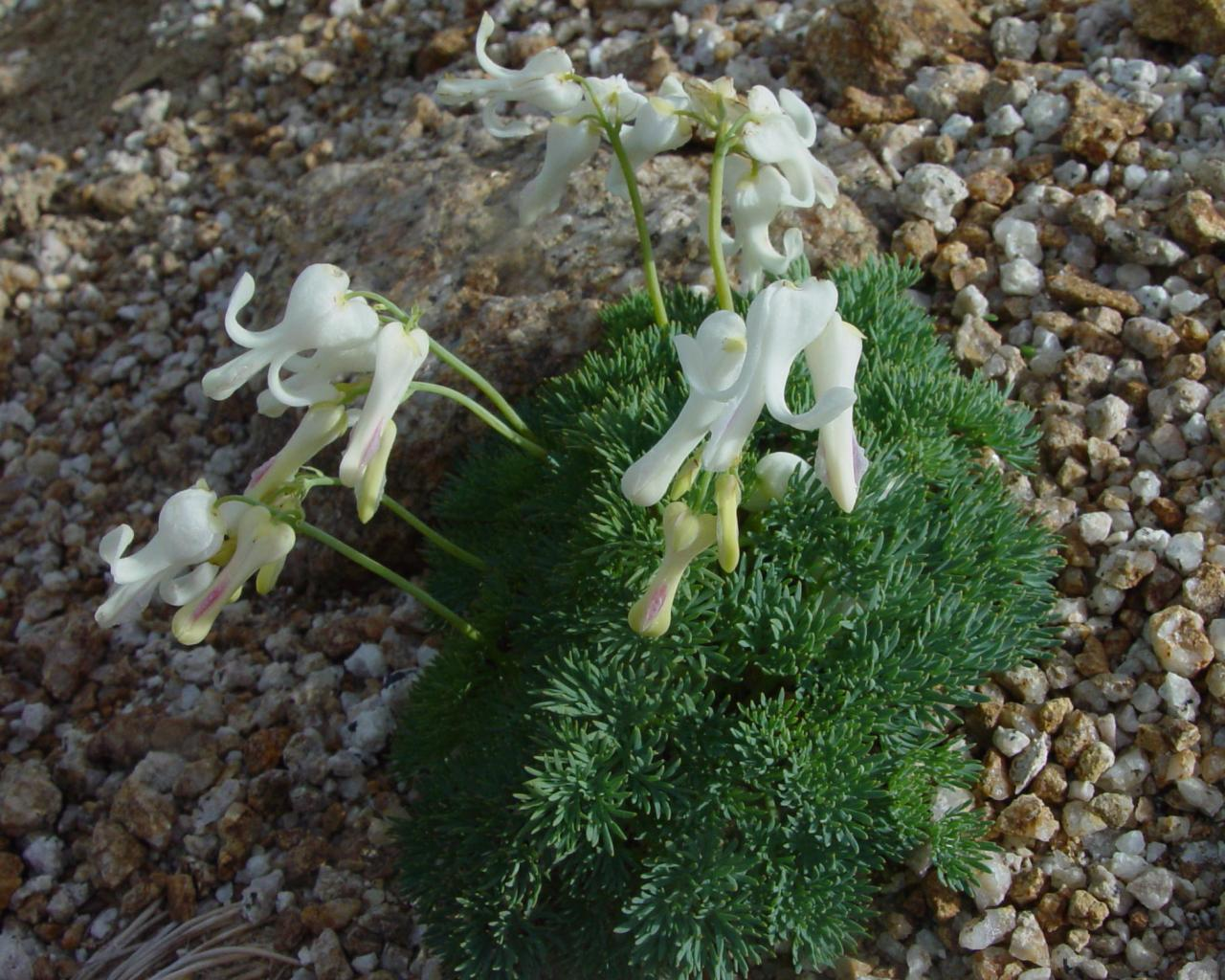
White form on Mount Tsubakuro, Nagano Prefecture, Japan

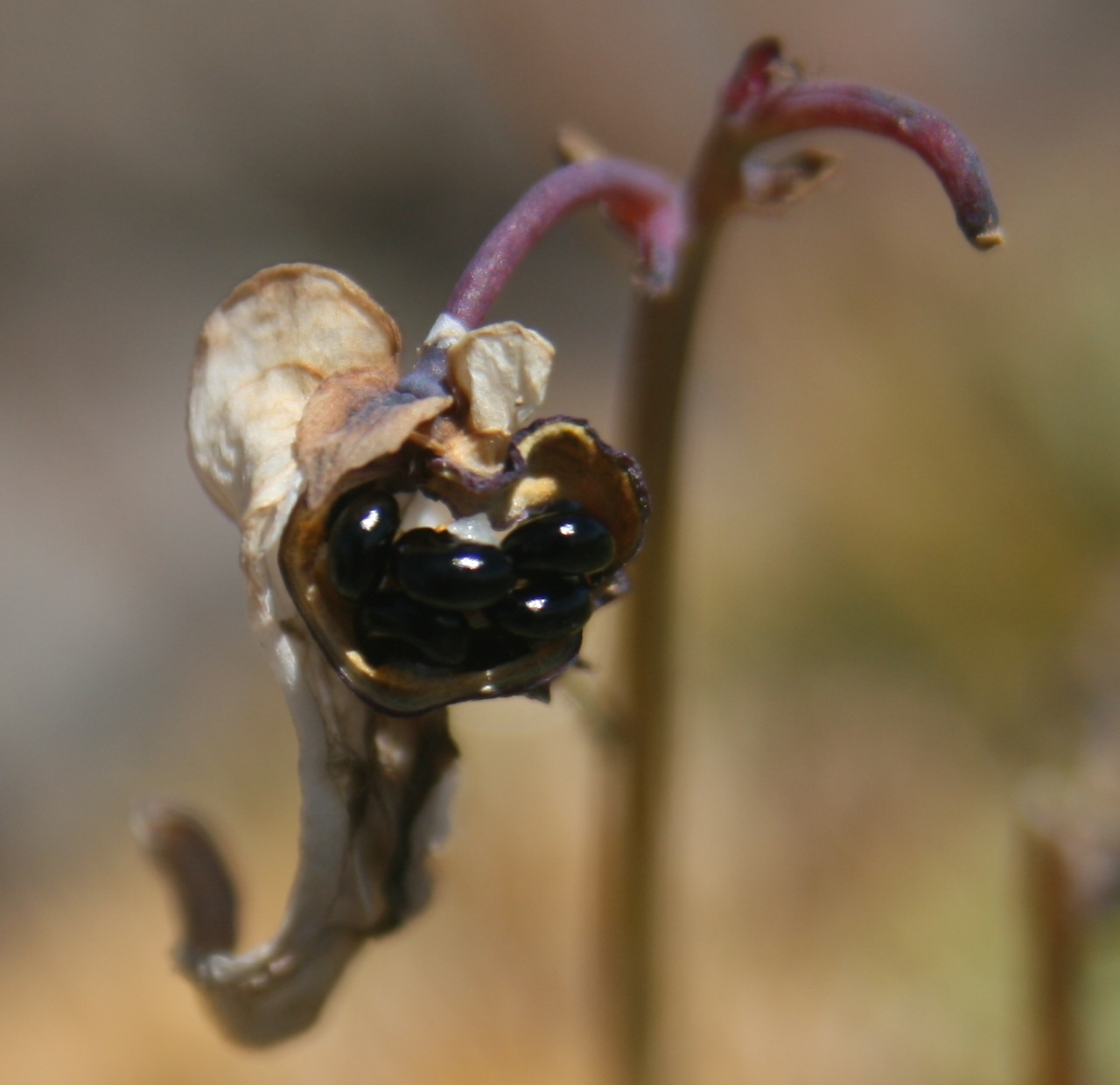
A broken pod with seed

== Ecology ==
Komakusa grows in Japan, the Kuril Islands, Sakhalin Island, and northeastern Siberia, including the Kamchatka Peninsula. It favors gravelly soil at high altitudes, 3,350 m (10,990 ft), in alpine tundra.

Wild plants

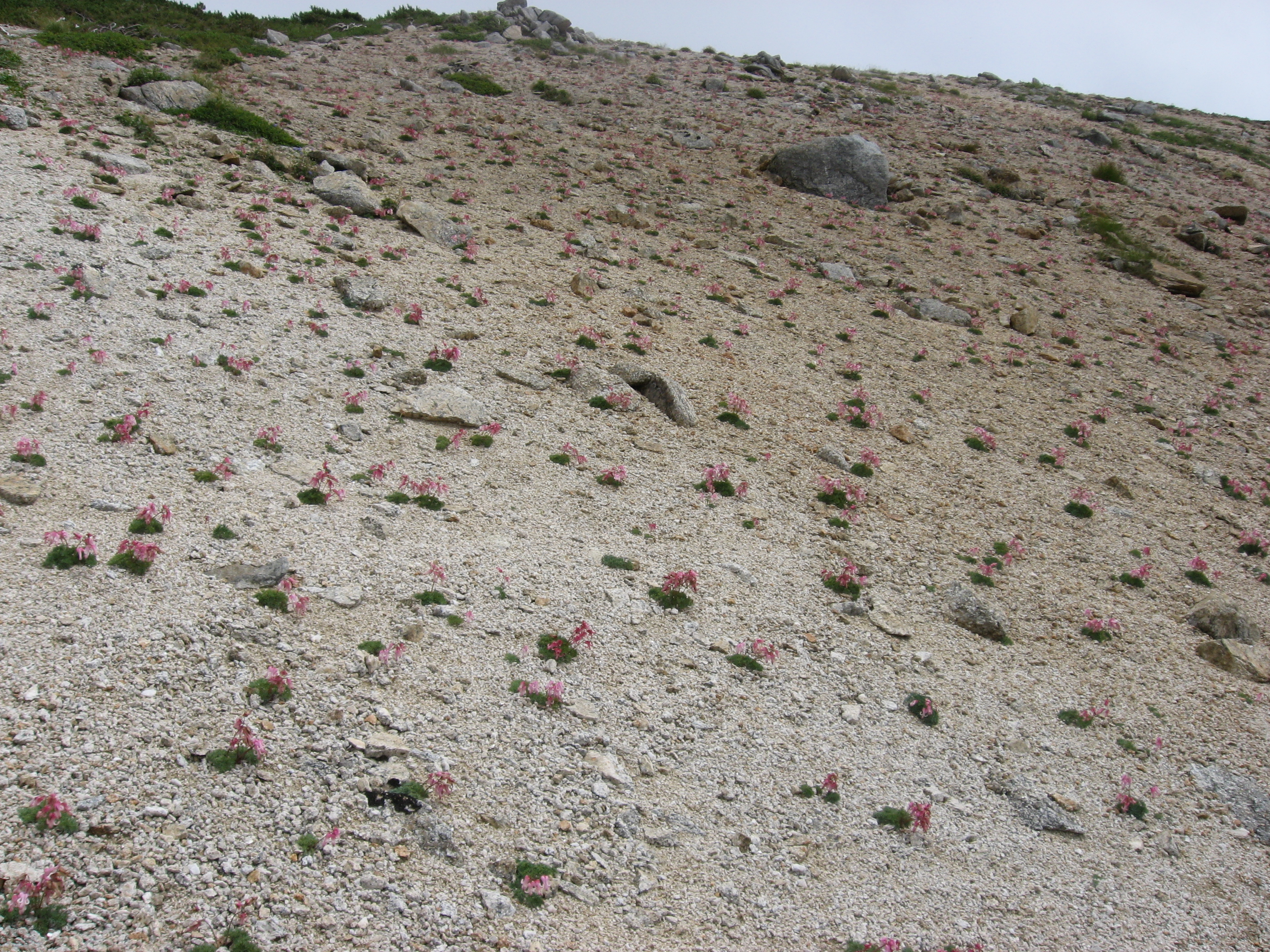
Gravelly alpine area scattered with komakusa on Mount Yari in the Hida Mountains

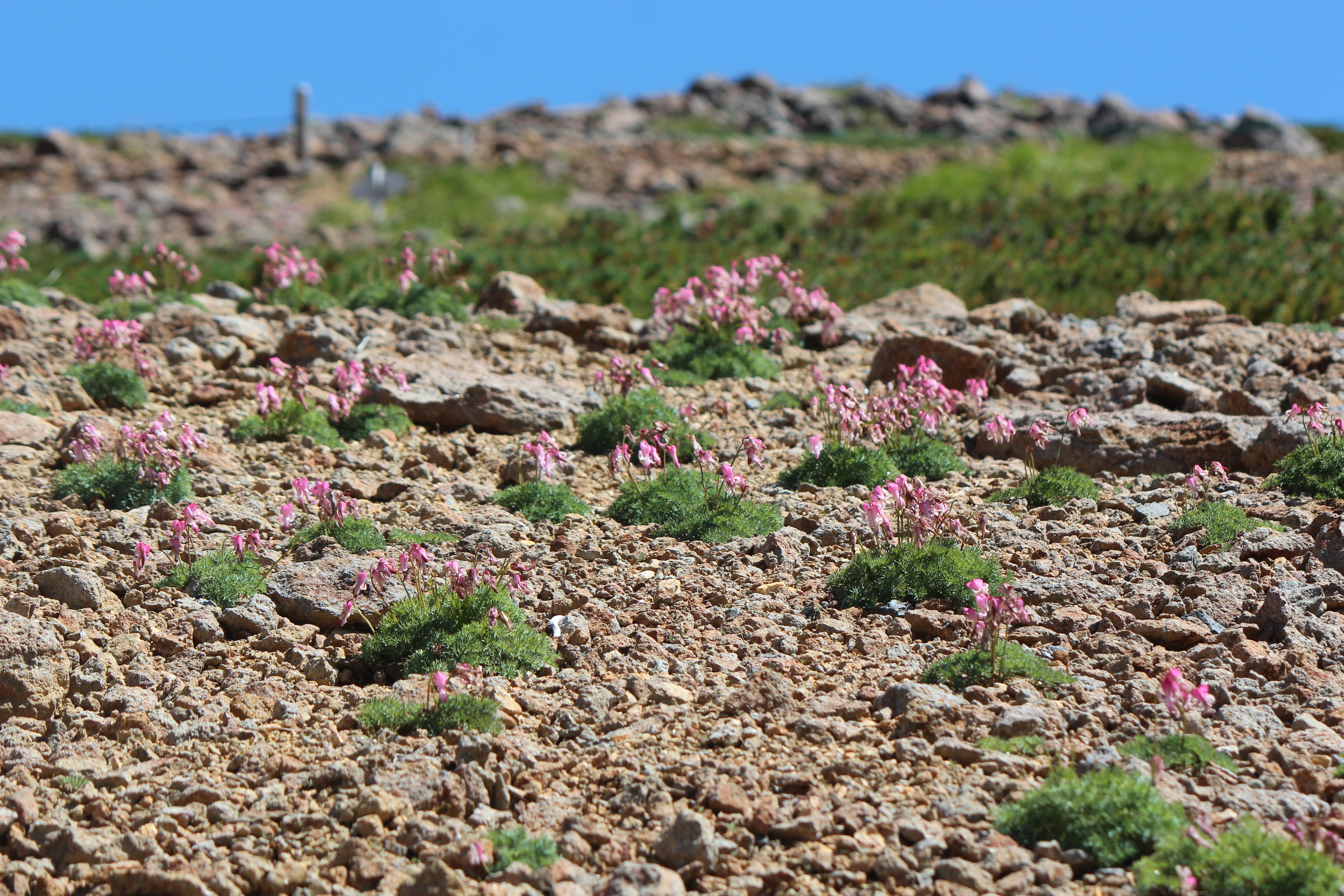
Komakusa plants on Mount Norikura

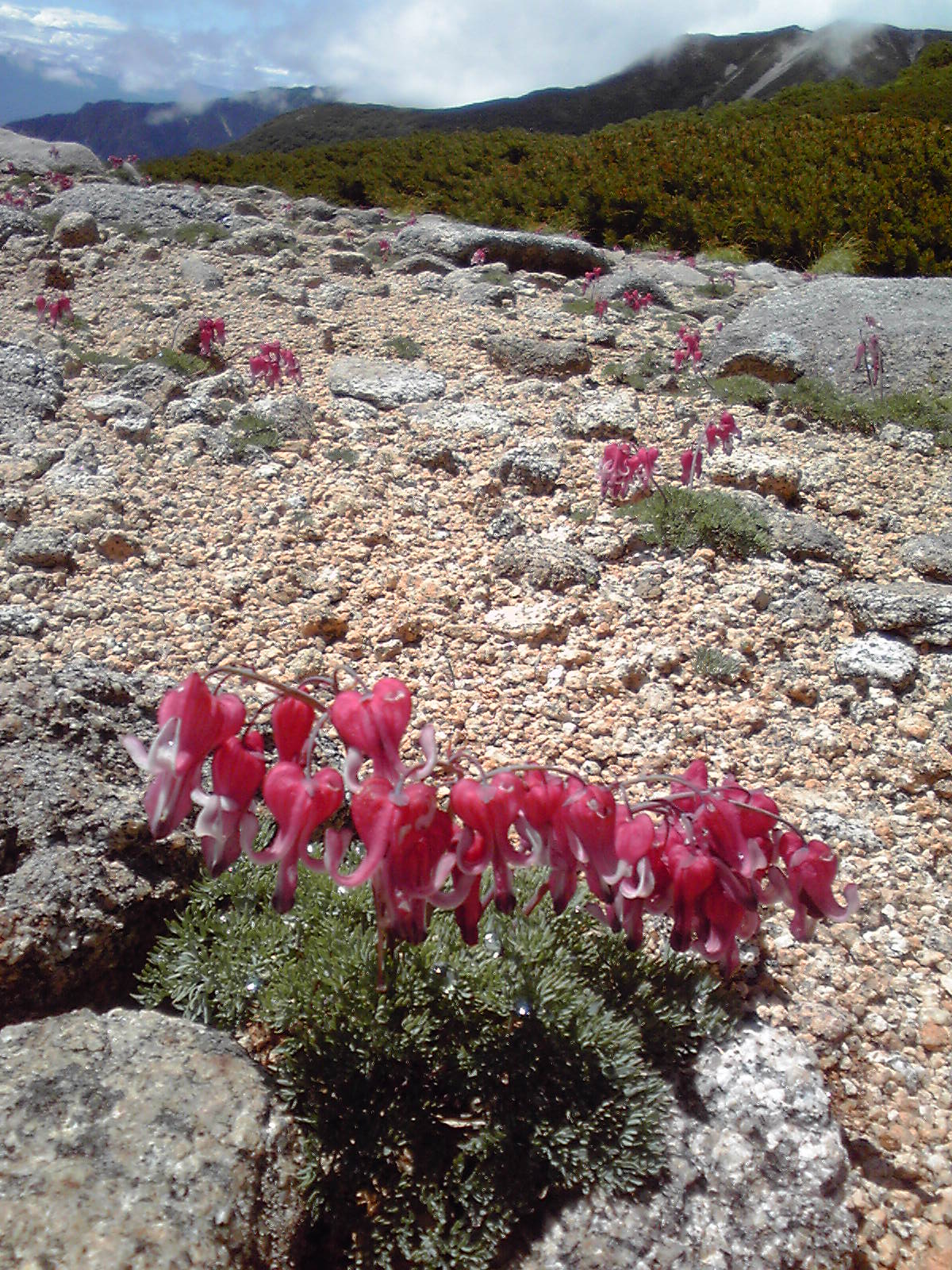
A deep pink komakusa in bloom with mountain as background

== Cultivars ==
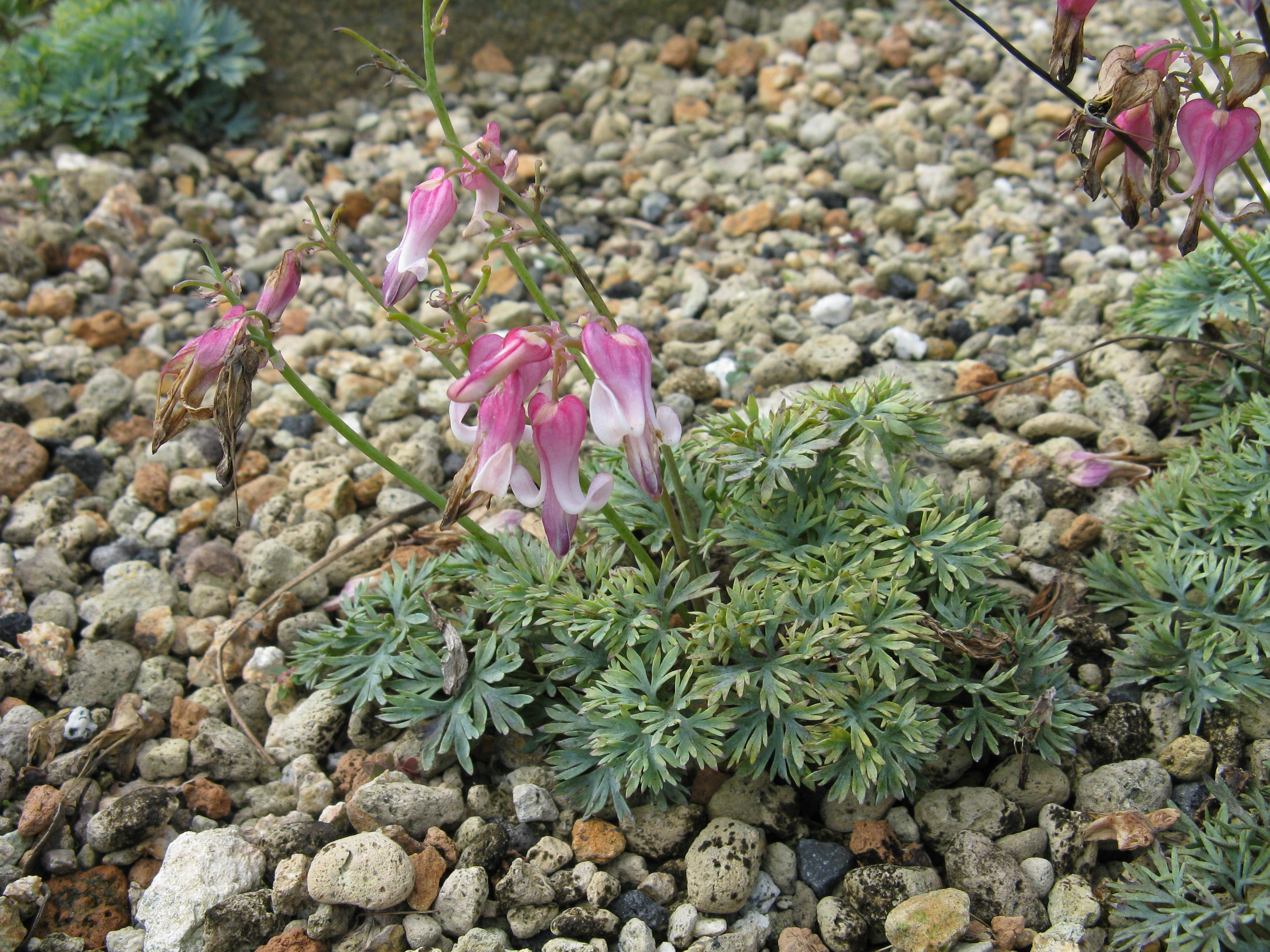
Hybrid (note wider-lobed leaves)

There are several hybrid cultivars, cultivated as ornamental plants, involving Dicentra eximia, Dicentra formosa, and Dicentra nevadensis.

- Dicentra 'Candy Hearts' (D. eximia × D. peregrina)
  rose-pink flowers
- Dicentra 'Gothenburg' (D. formosa subsp. oregana × D. peregrina f. alba) – light pink flowers
- Dicentra 'Ivory Hearts' (D. eximia × D. peregrina)
  white flowers
- Dicentra 'King of Hearts' – D. peregrina × (D. formosa subsp. oregana × D. eximia)
  pink flowers
- Dicentra 'Luxuriant' (D. eximia × D. peregrina)
  cherry-red flowers
- Dicentra 'Tsuneshigo Rokujo' (D. nevadensis × D. peregrina)
  pink flowers
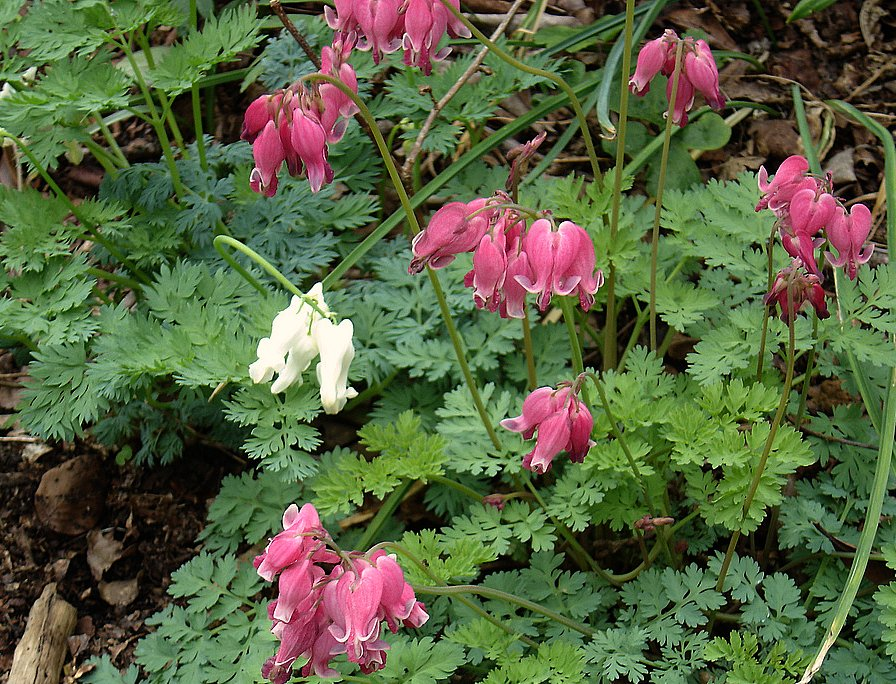
Dicentra 'King of Hearts'

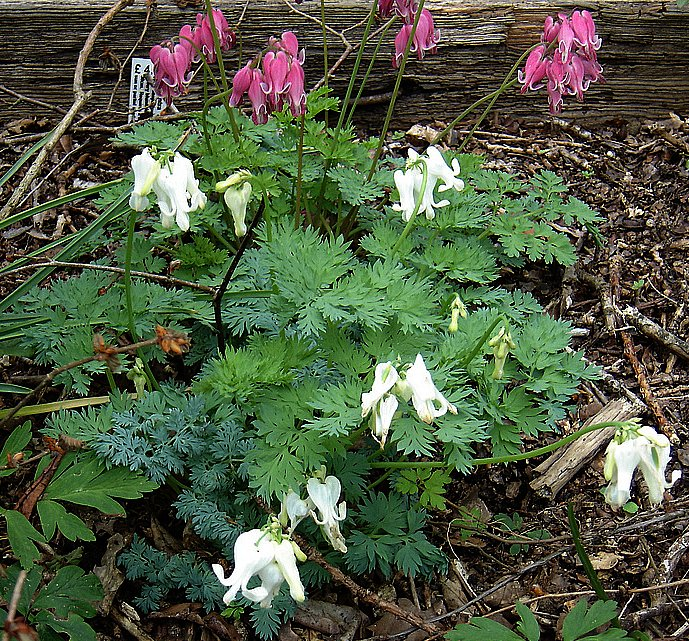
Dicentra 'Ivory Hearts'
