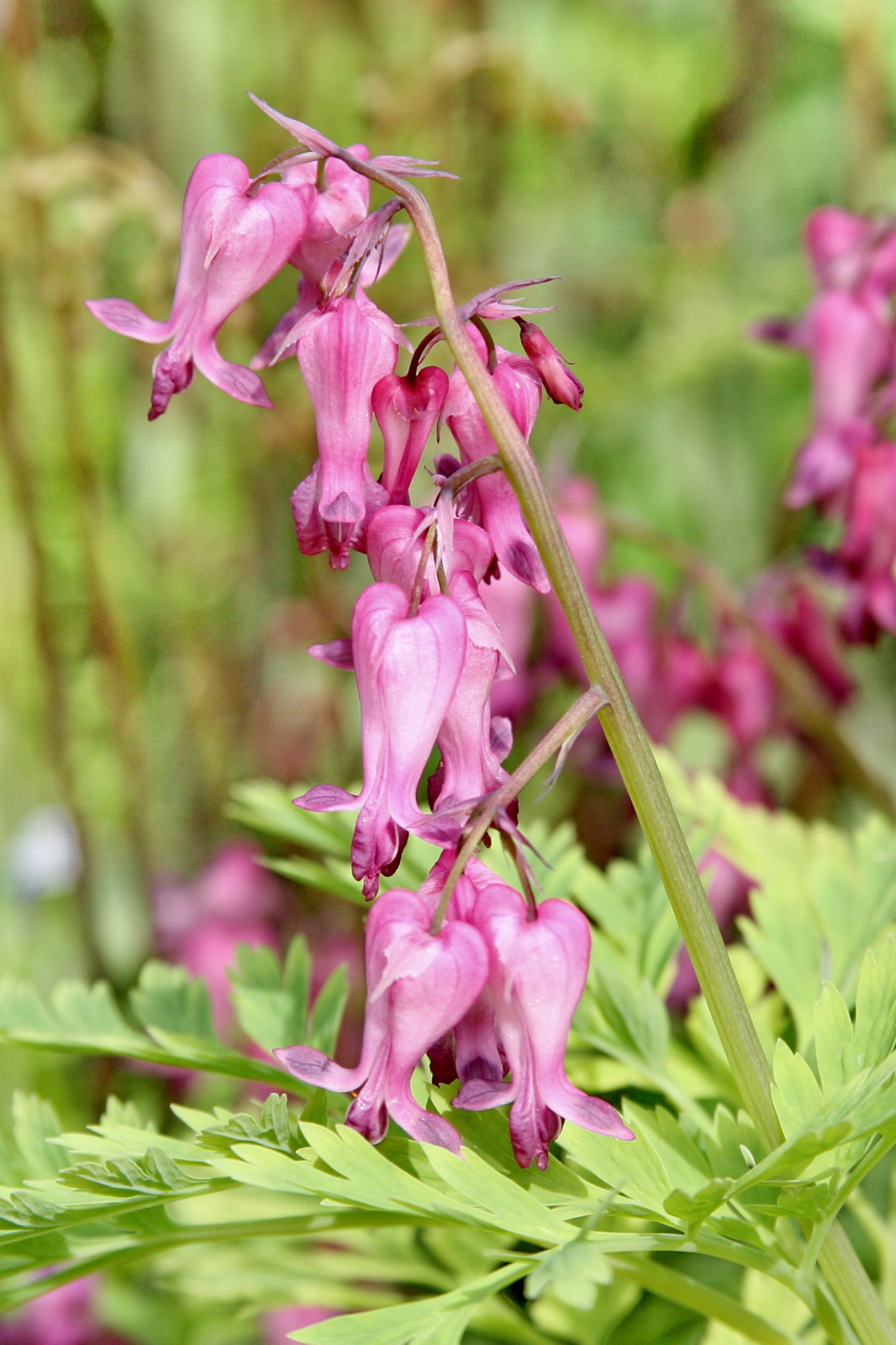

Conservation status
- Apparently Secure (NatureServe)

Scientific classification
- Kingdom: Plantae
- Clade: Tracheophytes
- Clade: Angiosperms
- Clade: Eudicots
- Order: Ranunculales
- Family: Papaveraceae
- Genus: Dicentra
- Species: D. eximia

Binomial name
- Dicentra eximia (Ker Gawl.) Torr.

= Dicentra eximia =

Species of flowering plant in the poppy family

Dicentra eximia (wild or fringed bleeding-heart, turkey-corn) is a flowering plant with fernlike leaves and oddly shaped flowers native to the Appalachian Mountains. It is similar to the Pacific bleeding-heart (Dicentra formosa), which grows on the Pacific Coast. Dicentra eximia is a perennial herb in the Papaveraceae family.

== Description ==
Leaves are finely divided and gray-green, growing from the base of the plant.

Flowers are pink and bloom in tight clusters at the top of leafless, fleshy stems above the leaves from mid-spring to autumn. The four petals are connected at the base. The two outer petals are pouched at the base and bent back at the tips. The inner petals are perpendicular to the outer petals and connected at the tip. The pistil is enclosed within the inner petals, and the two stamens are on either side. There are two tiny, triangular, pink sepals above the petals.

Seeds are borne in a plump, pointed pod. They ripen to black while the pod is still green. Each has a white elaiosome prized by ants.

Pacific bleeding-heart (Dicentra formosa) is frequently confused with and sold as Dicentra eximia. It has wider, more rounded flowers with shorter wings on the outer petals (see the photo below).

Flower and fruit structure

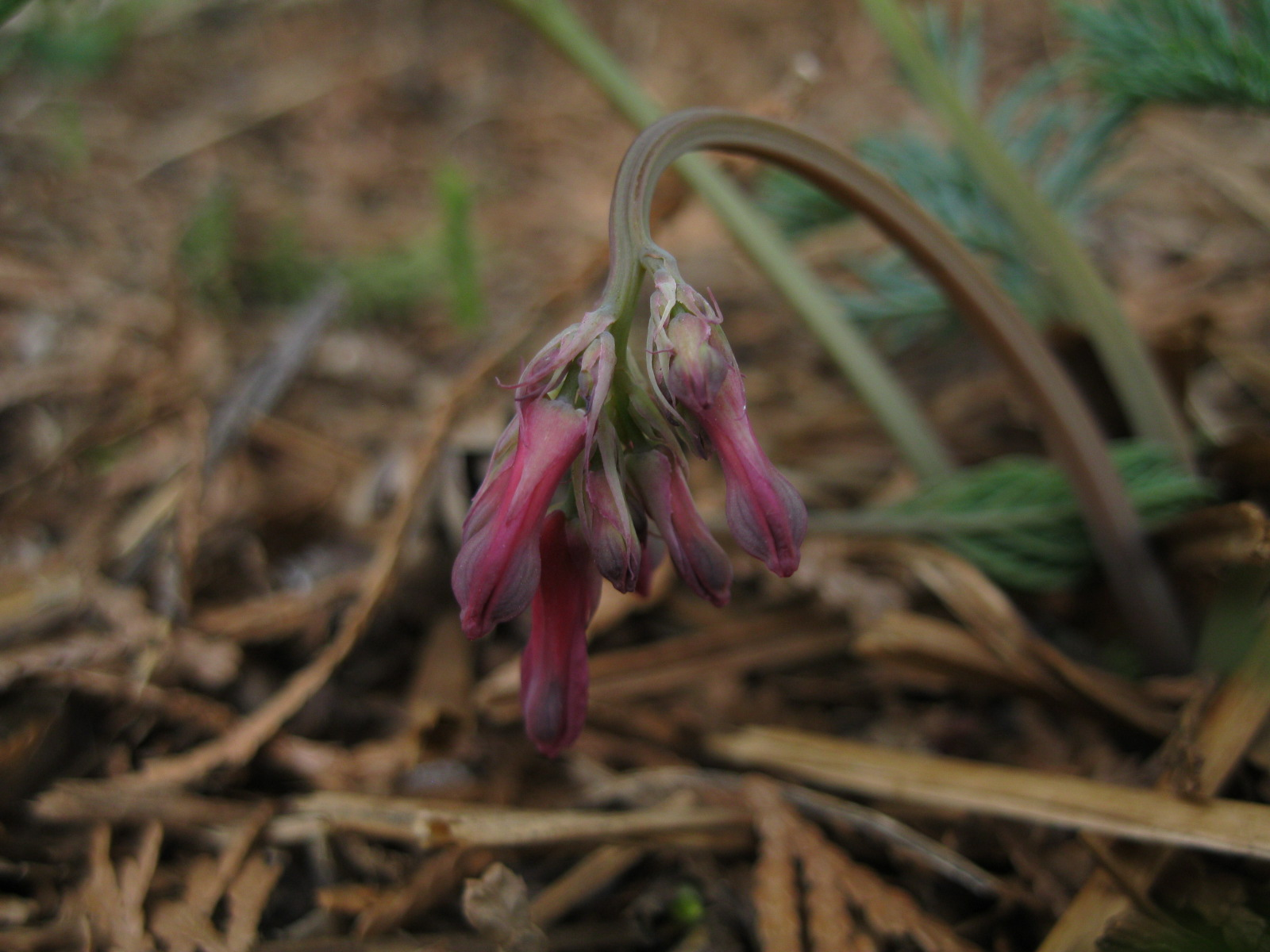
A cluster of buds

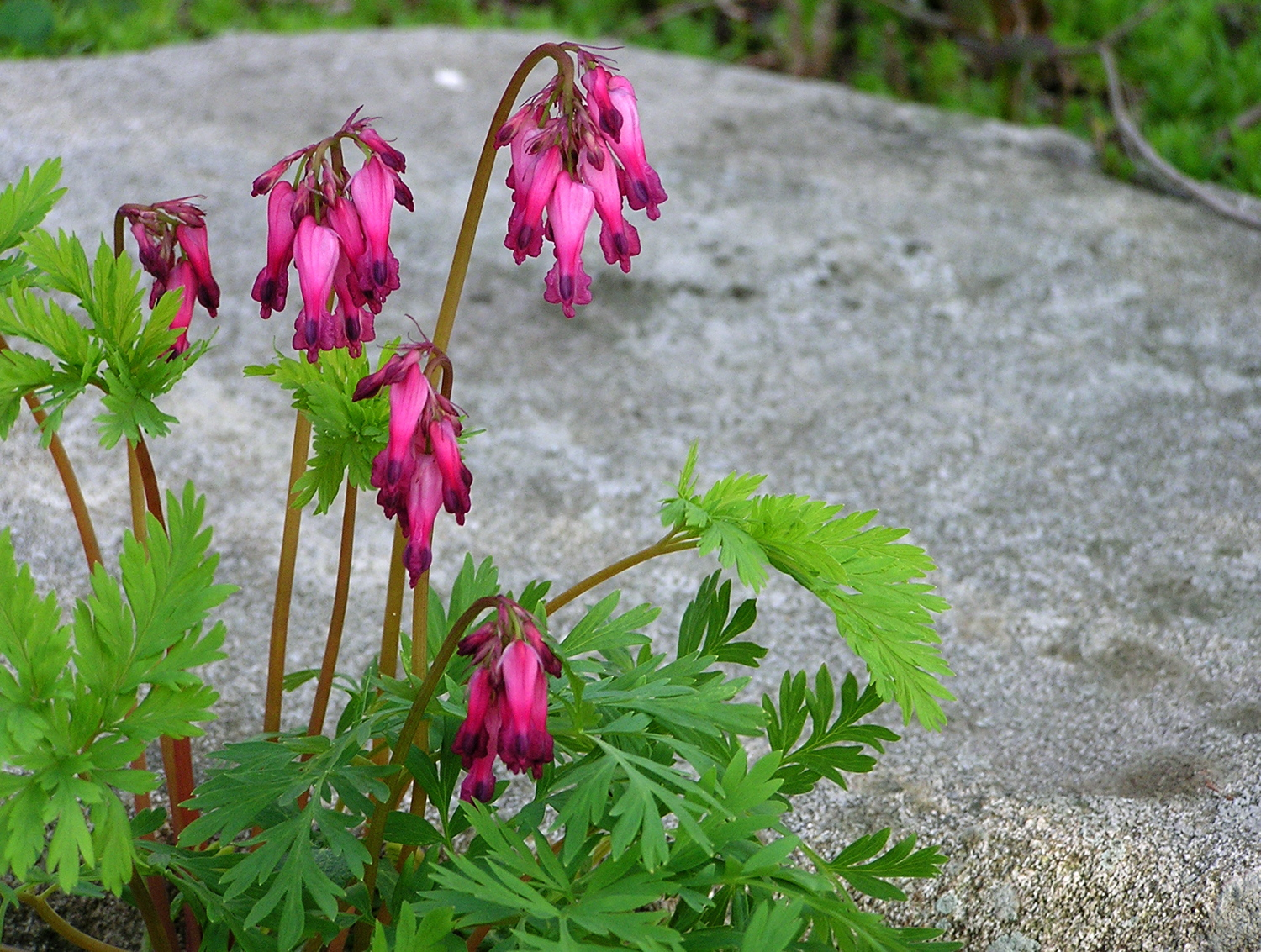
Almost opened flowers

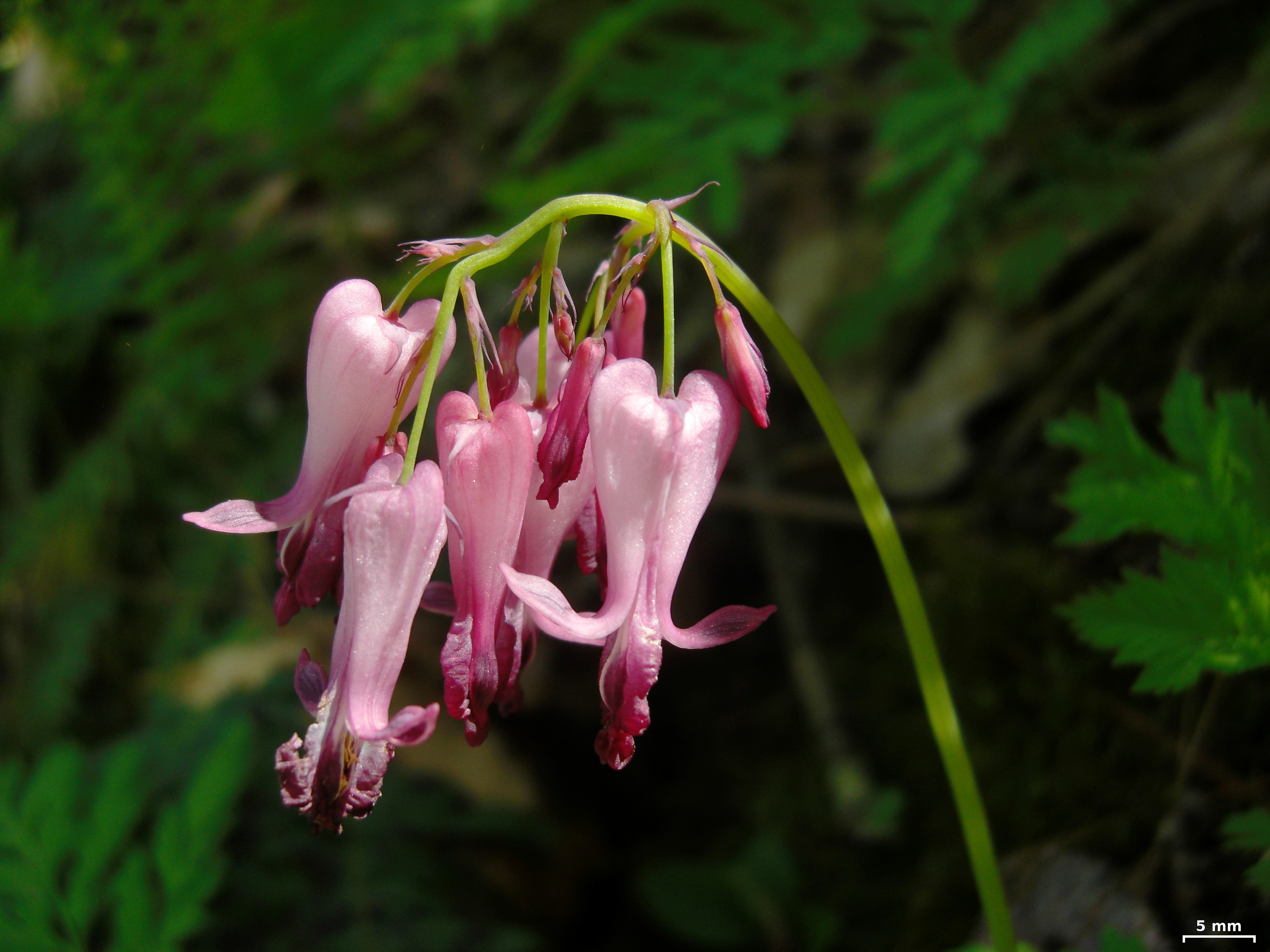
A cluster of opened flowers

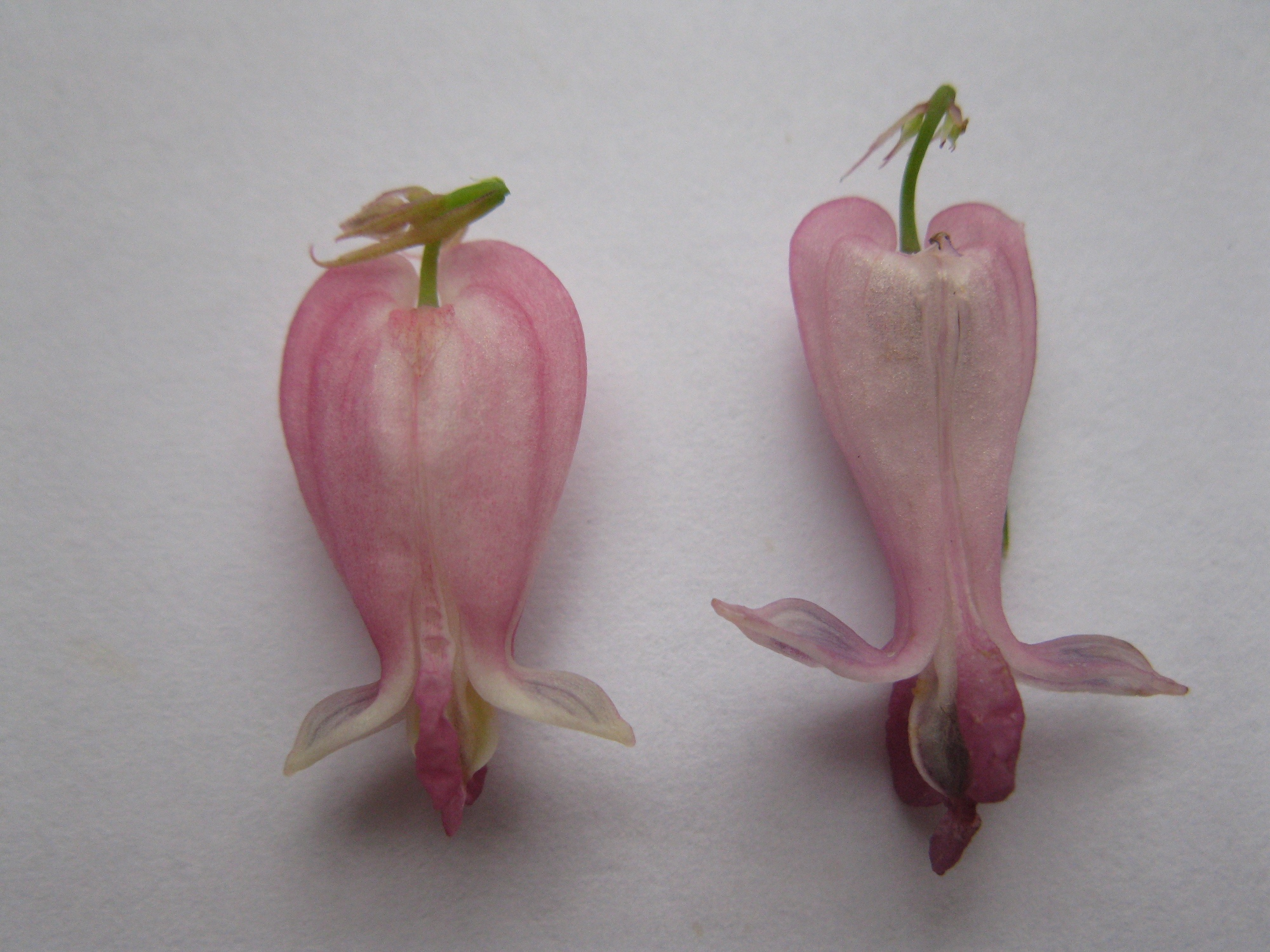
Flower shape: Dicentra 'Luxuriant' (a Dicentra formosa hybrid) compared with Dicentra eximia

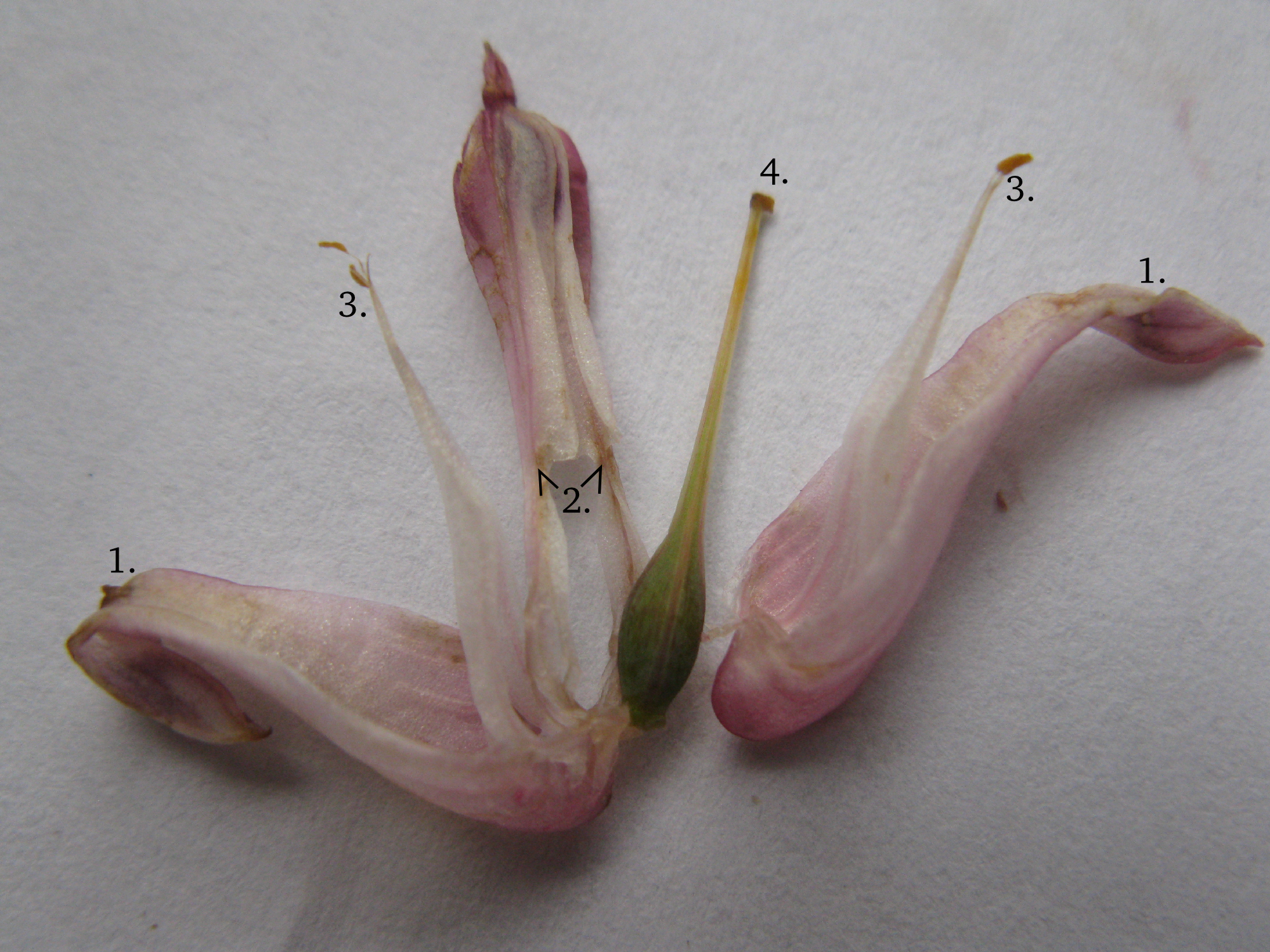
The flower's structure: four petals, two stamens, and a stigma

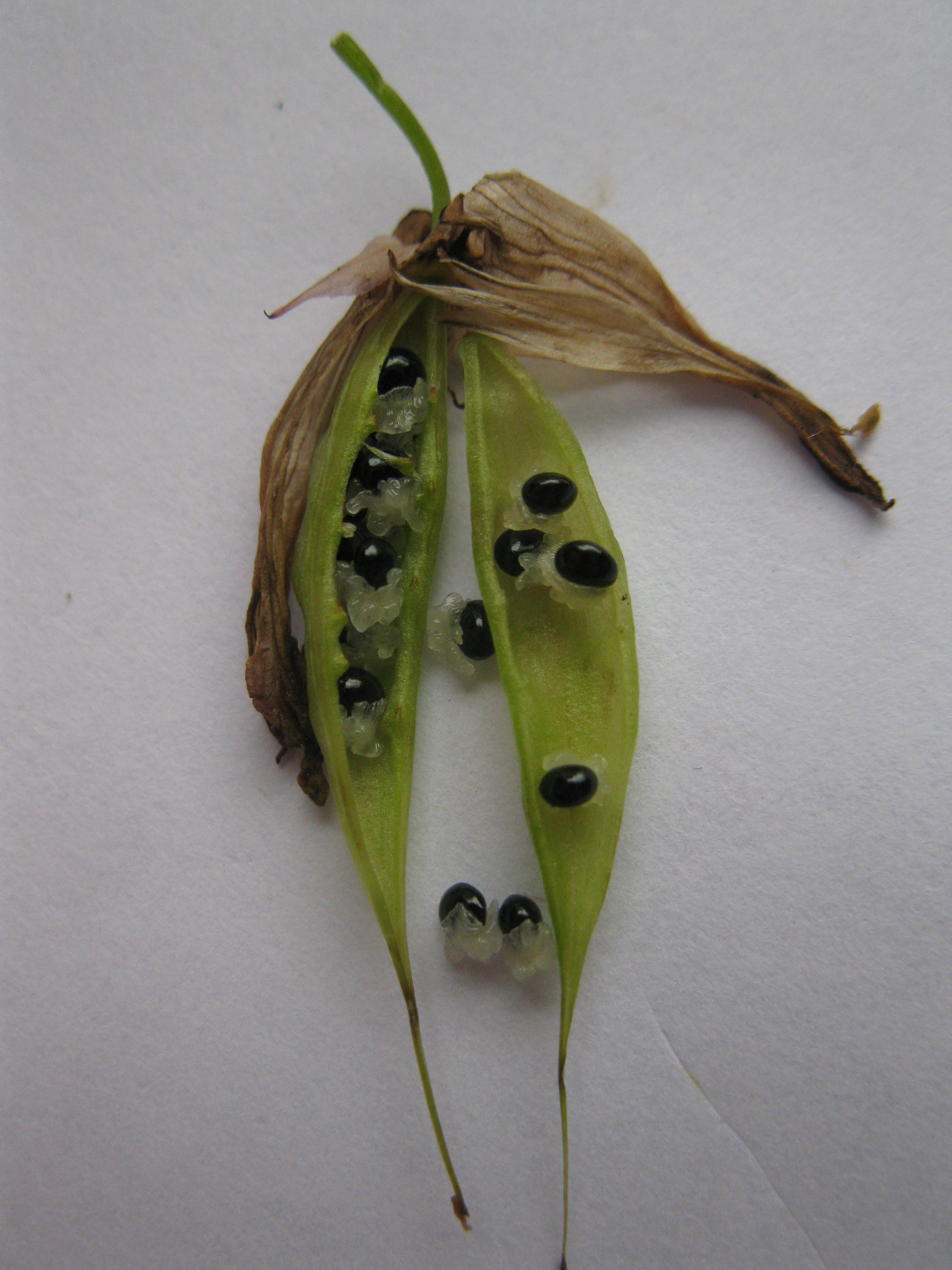
Pod and ripe seeds with white elaiosomes

== Ecology ==
Fringed bleeding-heart is native to the Appalachians from southwestern Pennsylvania south to Tennessee and North Carolina. It typically grows in rocky woodland at an altitude of 330 to 5,575 ft (100 to 1,700 m). It is known as a pollinator plant that attracts hummingbirds and bees.

Wild plants

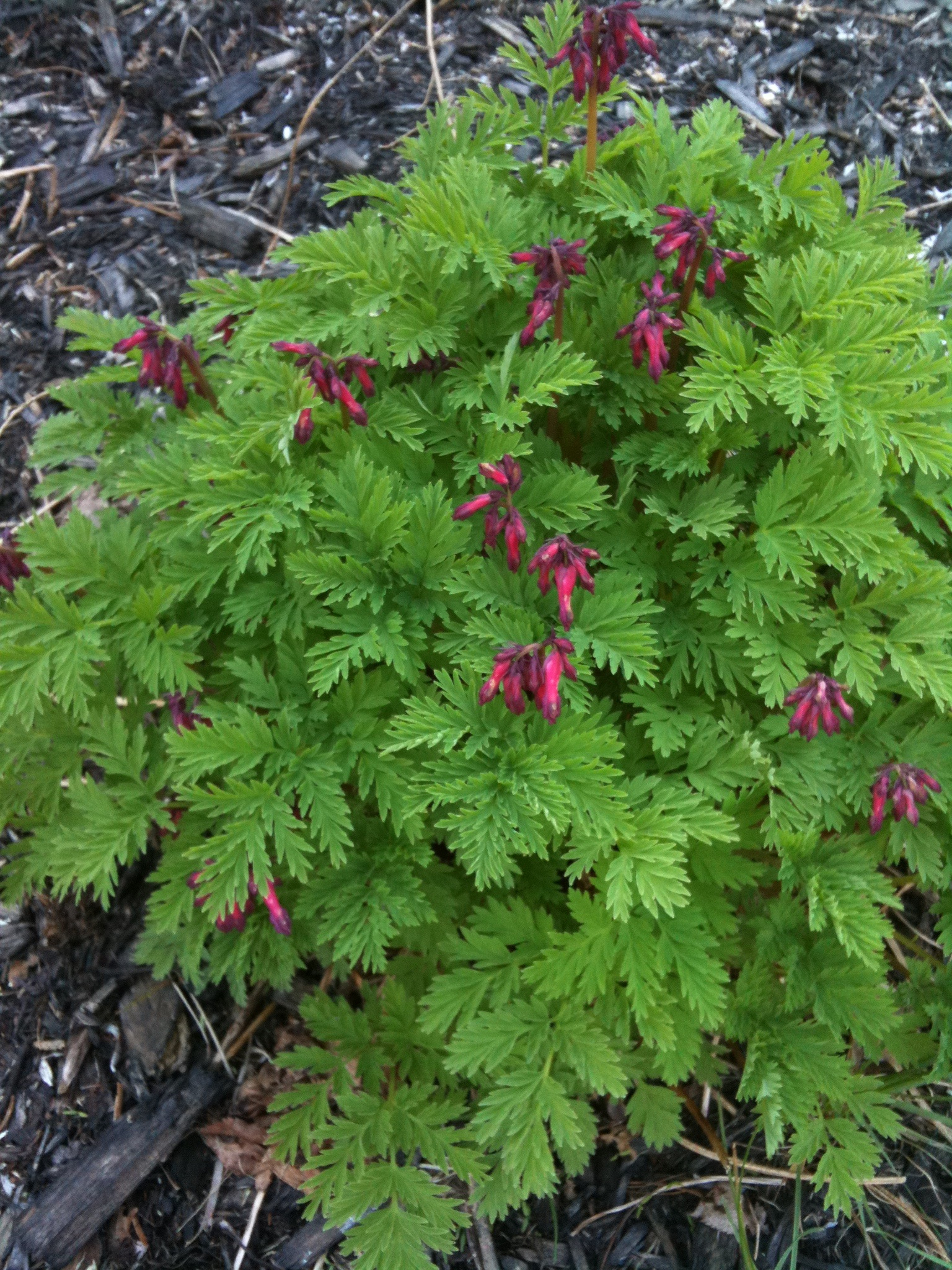
A plant with flowerbuds

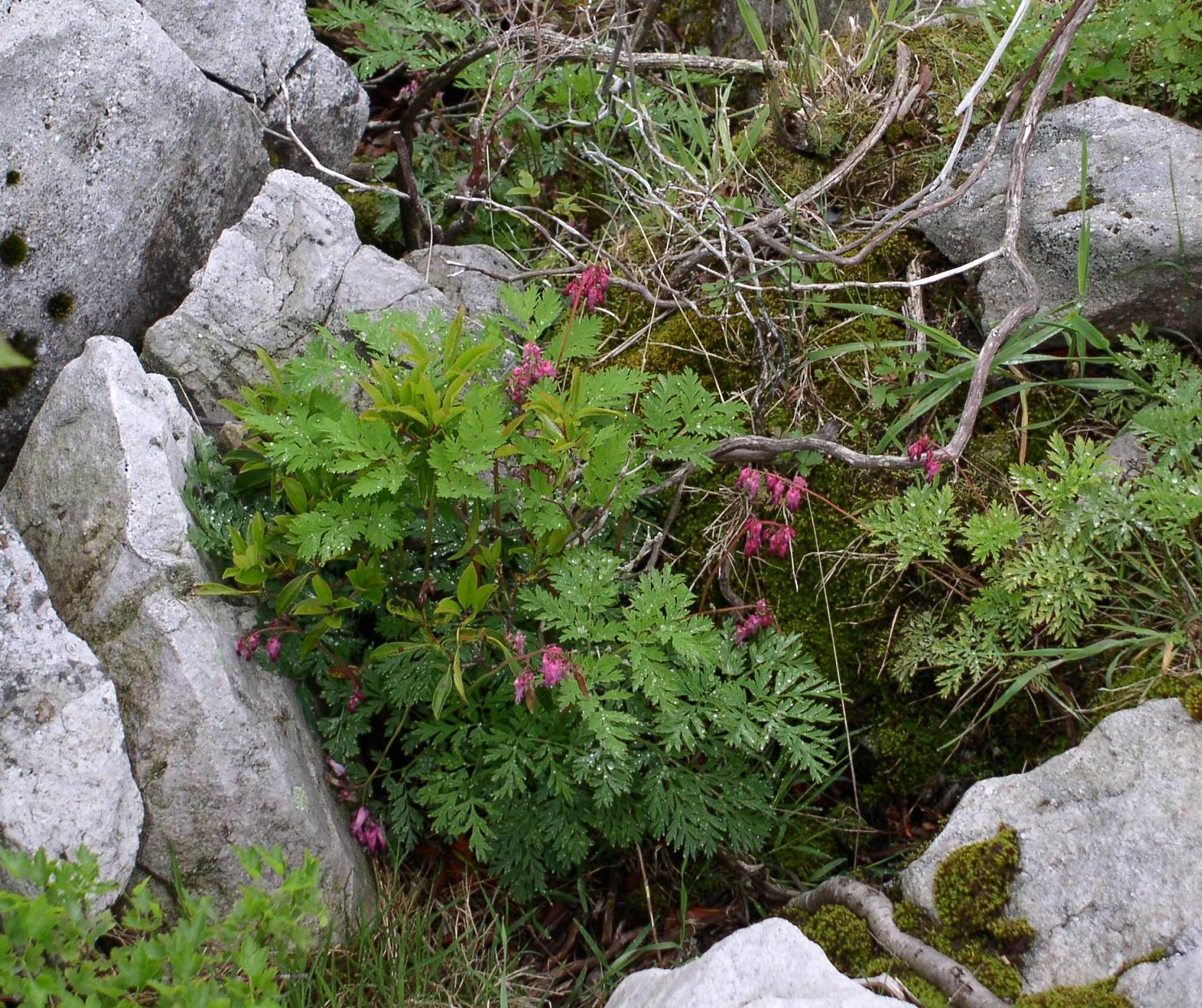
A wild plant growing amongst Tuscarora sandstone fragments in Dolly Sods Wilderness, West Virginia

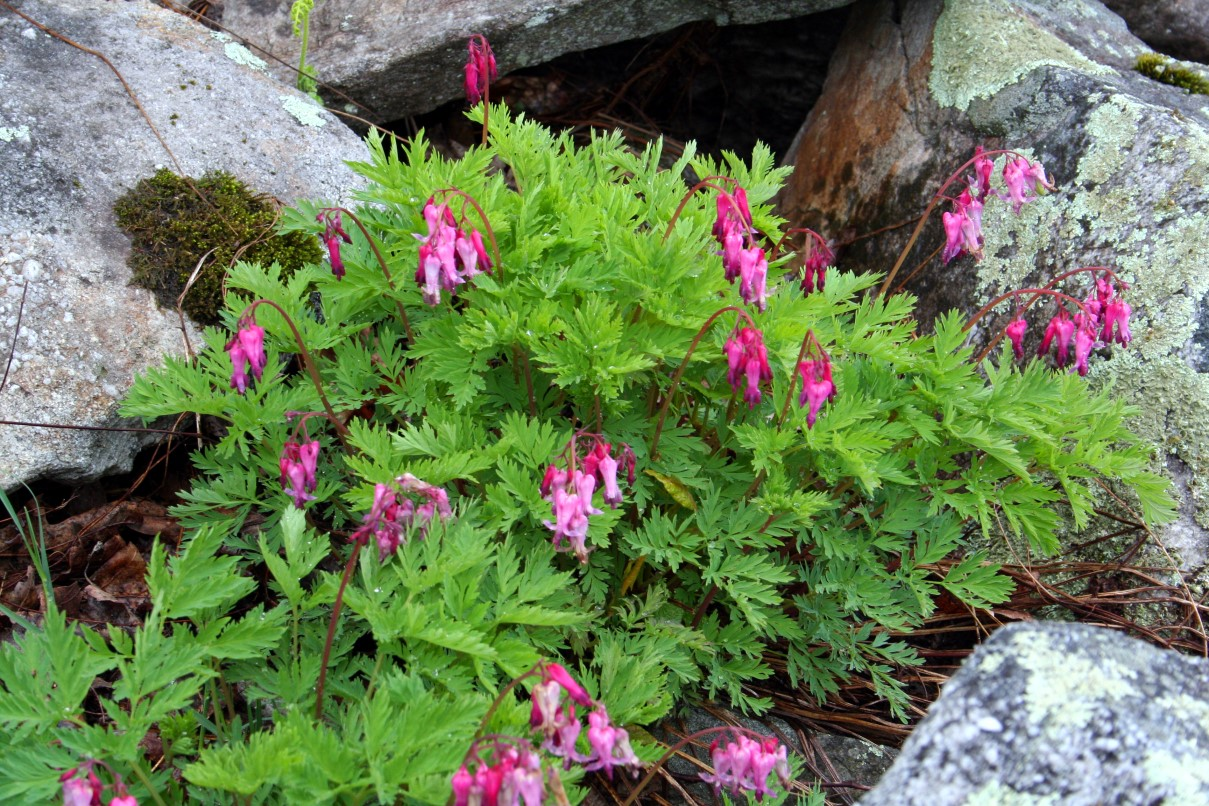
Another wild plant in West Virginia

== Cultivars ==
There are several cultivars of Dicentra eximia. Some are hybrids with Dicentra peregrina and Dicentra formosa.

Dicentra eximia

- Dicentra eximia 'Alba' — white flowers
- Dicentra eximia 'Snowdrift' — larger white flowers

Hybrids

- Dicentra 'Bountiful' — Dicentra formosa subsp. oregana × Dicentra eximia — rosy red flowers
- Dicentra 'King of Hearts' — Dicentra peregrina × (Dicentra formosa subsp. oregana × Dicentra eximia) — pink flowers, very finely cut leaves
- Dicentra 'Luxuriant' — Dicentra eximia × Dicentra peregrina — cherry-red flowers
- Dicentra 'Silversmith — Dicentra formosa subsp. oregana × Dicentra eximia — white, pink-flushed flowers
- Dicentra 'Stuart Boothman' — probably Dicentra formosa subsp. oregana × Dicentra eximia — deep pink flowers
