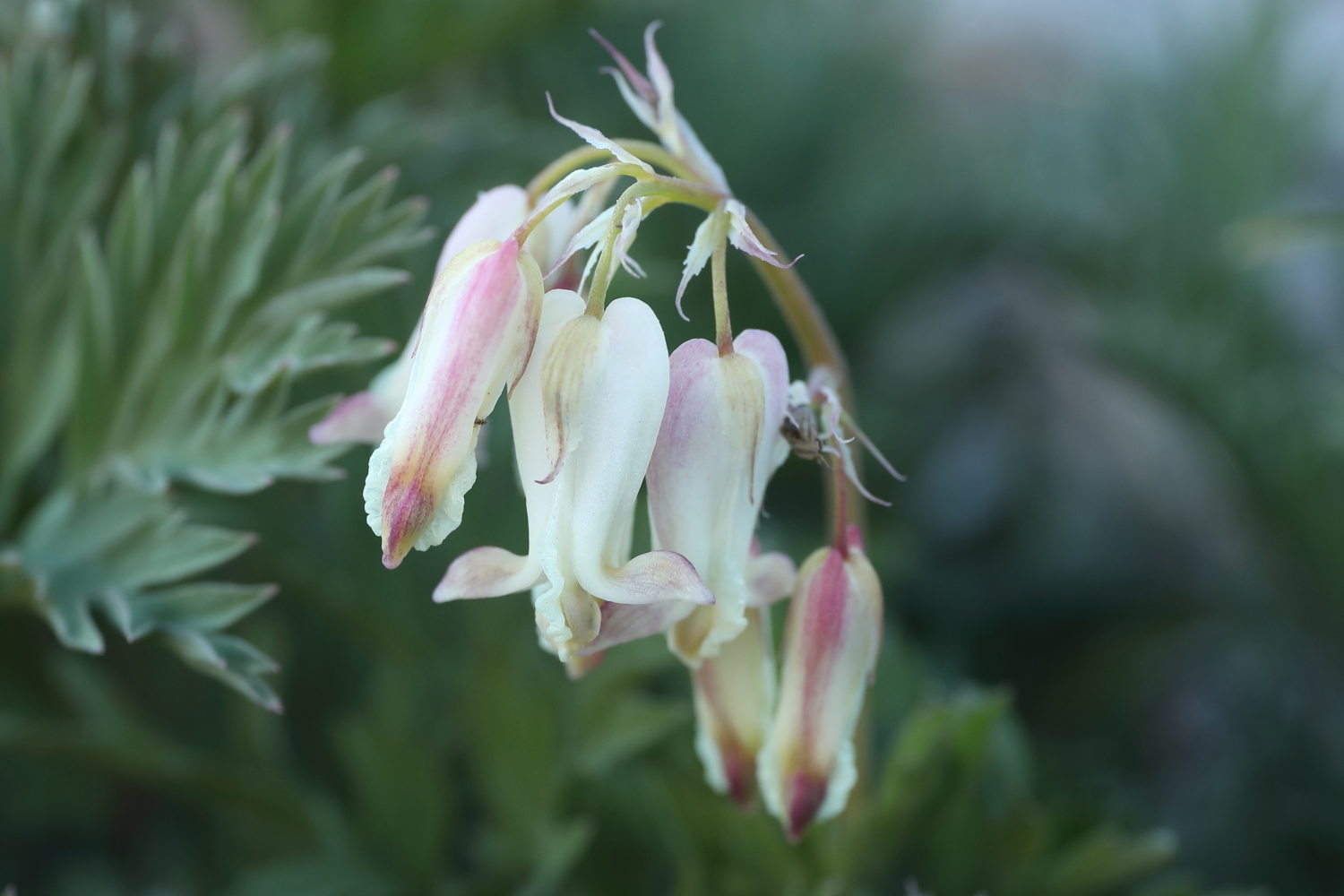

Scientific classification
- Kingdom: Plantae
- Clade: Tracheophytes
- Clade: Angiosperms
- Clade: Eudicots
- Order: Ranunculales
- Family: Papaveraceae
- Genus: Dicentra
- Species: D. nevadensis

Binomial name
- Dicentra nevadensis Eastw.

= Dicentra nevadensis =

Species of flowering plant in the poppy family

Dicentra nevadensis, the Sierra bleeding heart or Tulare County bleeding heart, is a perennial plant endemic to gravelly outcroppings in the Sierra Nevada peaks of Tulare and Fresno Counties in California.

It has previously been treated as a subspecies of Dicentra formosa (Pacific bleeding heart). The plant is found at elevations of 2,100–3,300 metres (6,900–10,800 ft).

== Description ==
Dicentra nevadensis leaves are finely divided and sprout from the base of the plant.

Flowers are heart-shaped, dull white, pink, or yellow-brown, hanging in racemes on bare stems above the leaves. When dried, the flowers turn black. Flowers bloom June to August.

Seeds are borne in a capsule one to two centimeters long.
