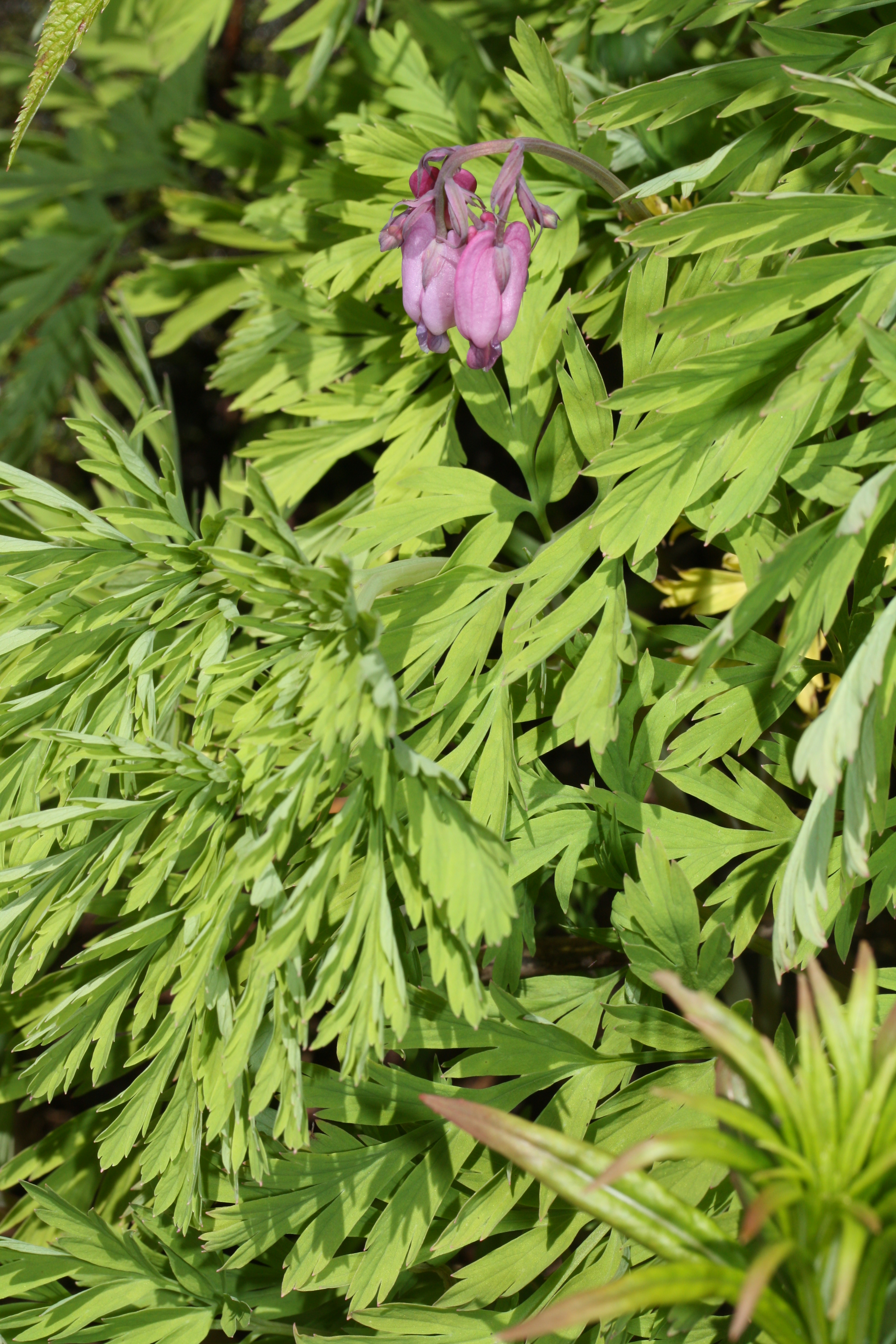

Scientific classification
- Kingdom: Plantae
- Clade: Tracheophytes
- Clade: Angiosperms
- Clade: Eudicots
- Order: Ranunculales
- Family: Papaveraceae
- Genus: Dicentra
- Species: D. formosa

Binomial name
- Dicentra formosa (Andrews) Walp.

= Dicentra formosa =

Species of flowering plant in the poppy family

Dicentra formosa (western, wild or Pacific bleeding-heart) is a species of flowering plant in the poppy family, Papaveraceae (subfamily: Fumarioideae). With its fern-like foliage and inflorescence of drooping pink, purple, yellow or cream "hearts", this species is native to the Pacific Northwest of North America.

== Subspecies ==
There are two subspecies, Dicentra formosa subsp. formosa and Dicentra formosa subsp. oregona. Subsp. formosa grows in the majority of the plant's range, from Vancouver Island and southern British Columbia and south through Washington and Oregon to central California in the Coast Ranges and Cascades, and on the western slope of the Sierra Nevada. Subsp. oregana grows in a small area of southern Oregon and northern California in serpentine soils in the Siskiyou Mountains. These subspecies are also distinguished by appearance:

| Image | Subspecies | Notes |
|---|---|---|
| | Dicentra formosa formosa | leaves glaucous beneath and never glaucous above, flowers purple pink to pink or white |
| | Dicentra formosa oregona | (often spelled oregana) – leaves glaucous above and beneath, flowers cream or pale yellow |

== Description ==
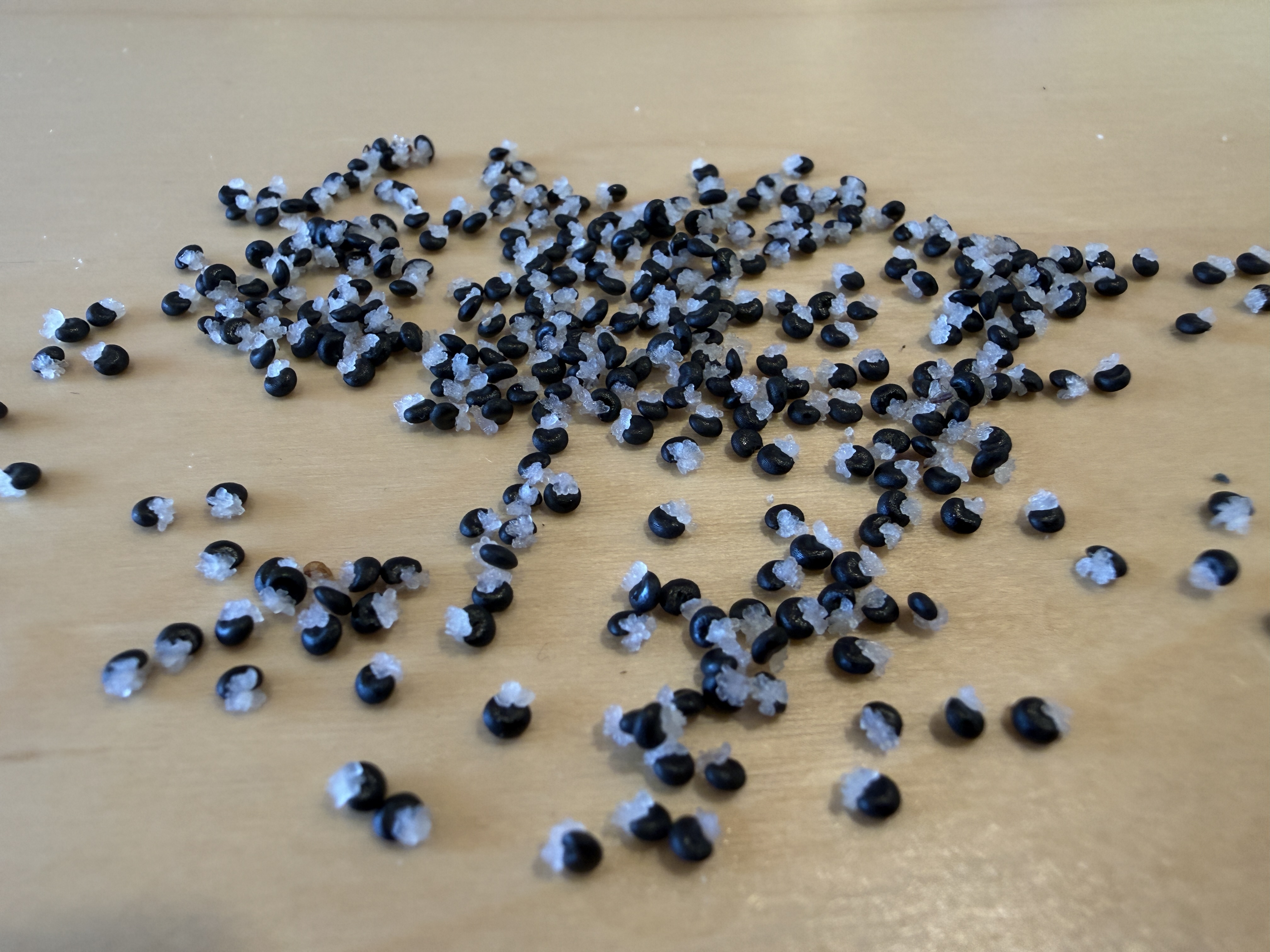
Seeds

Pacific bleeding-heart is a perennial herbaceous plant. Its leaves are three to four times divided and fern-like, growing from a brittle rhizome at the base of the plant. It grows to 18 in (45 cm) tall by 24 in (60 cm) wide.

The flowers are pink, red, or white and heart-shaped and bloom in clusters of 5 to 15 at the top of leafless, fleshy stems above the leaves from mid-spring to autumn, with peak flowering in spring. The four petals are attached at the base. The two outer petals form a pouch at the base and curve outwards at the tips. The two inner petals are perpendicular to the outer petals and connected at the tip. There are two tiny, pointed sepals behind the petals. Seeds are borne in plump, pointed pods. The plant self-seeds readily. It frequently goes dormant for the summer after flowering, emerging and flowering again in autumn.

The species contains isoquinoline, a toxic alkaloid known to be fatal to cattle.

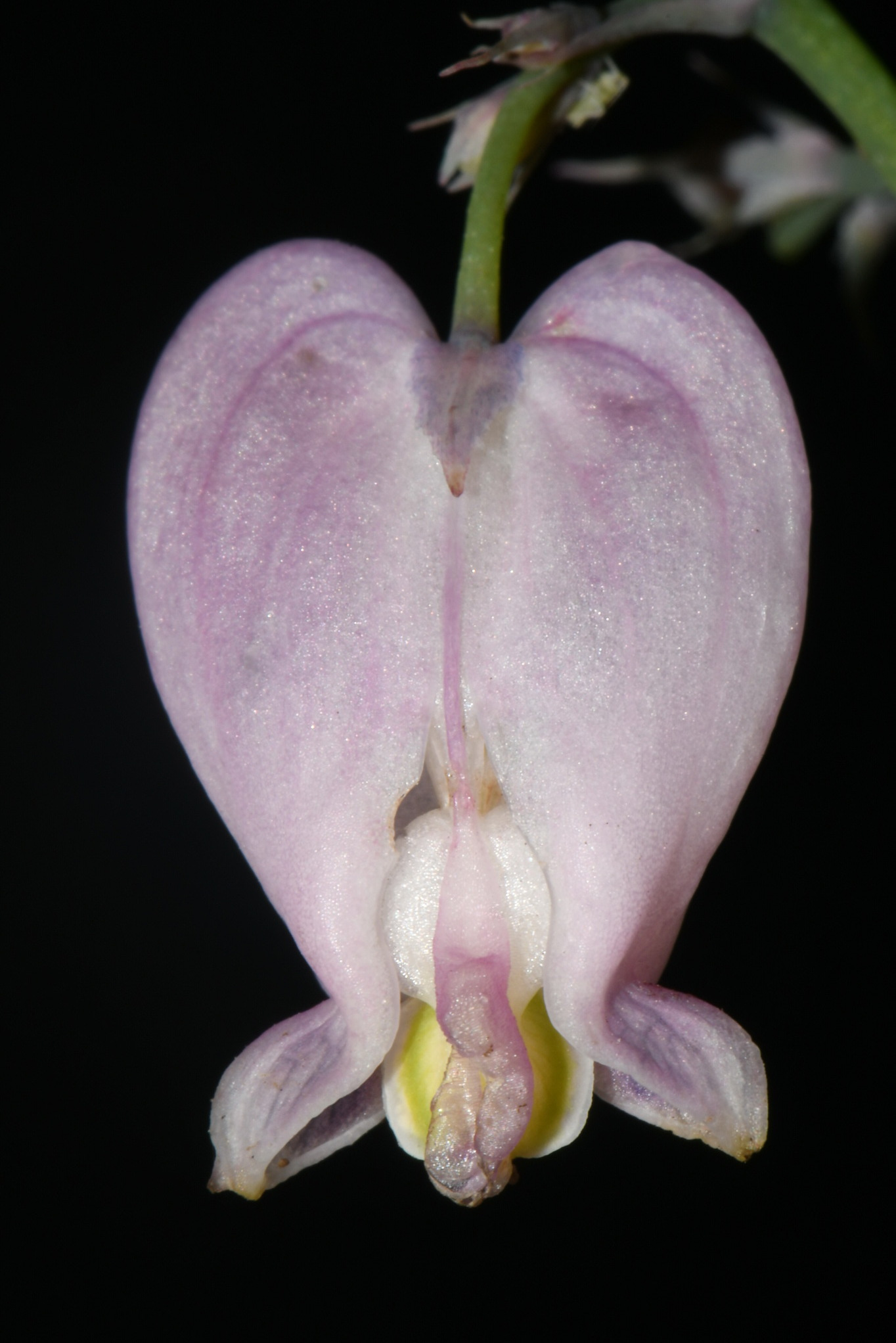
D. formosa

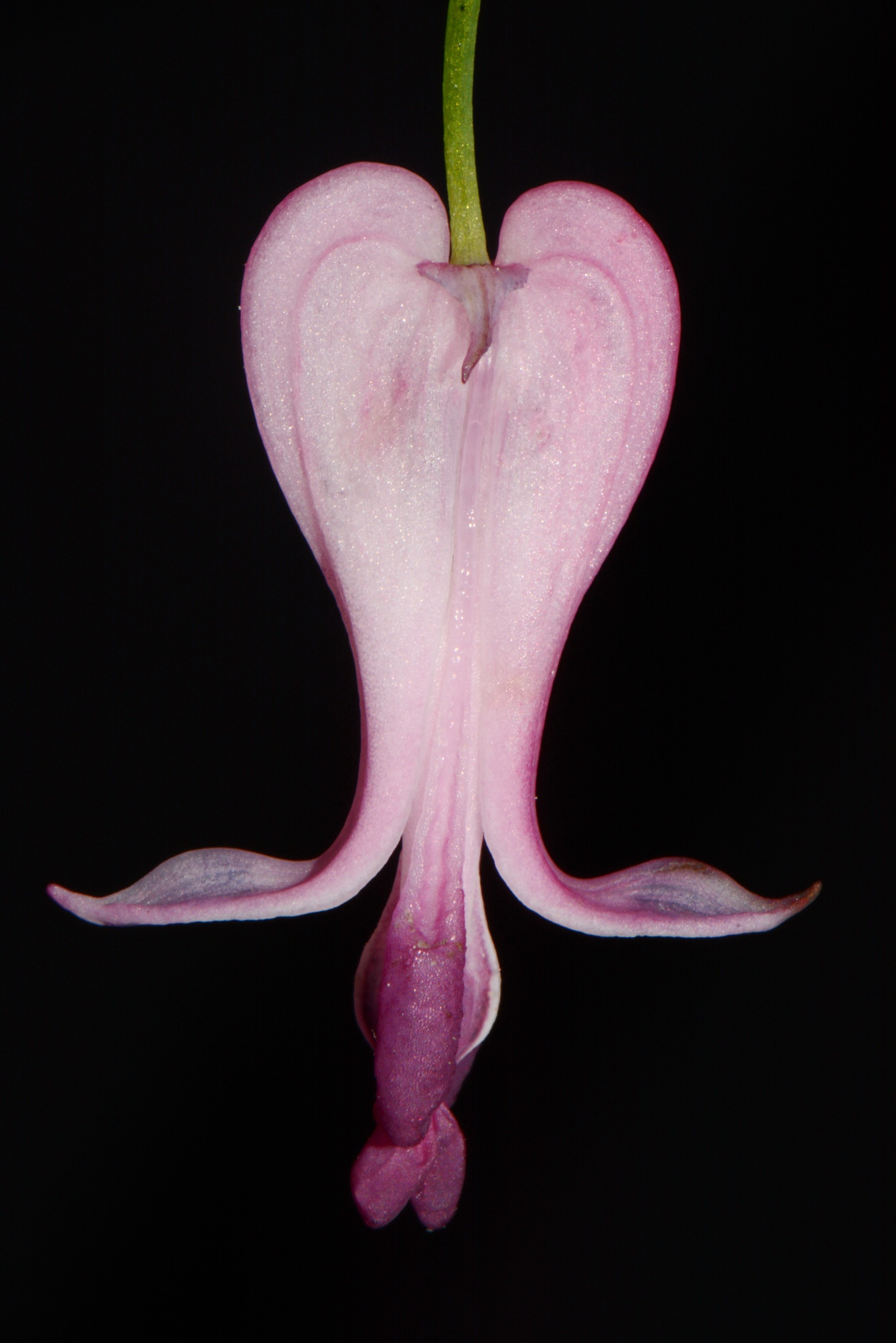
D. eximia

The Pacific bleeding-heart is frequently confused with the fringed bleeding-heart (Dicentra eximia) and sold under that name. The fringed bleeding-heart, an Appalachian-area plant, has narrower flowers and longer, more curved outer petal tips. The popular related plant, Lamprocapnos spectabilis, also called "bleeding heart" and native to Asia, was formerly placed in the same genus.

Flowers and leaves

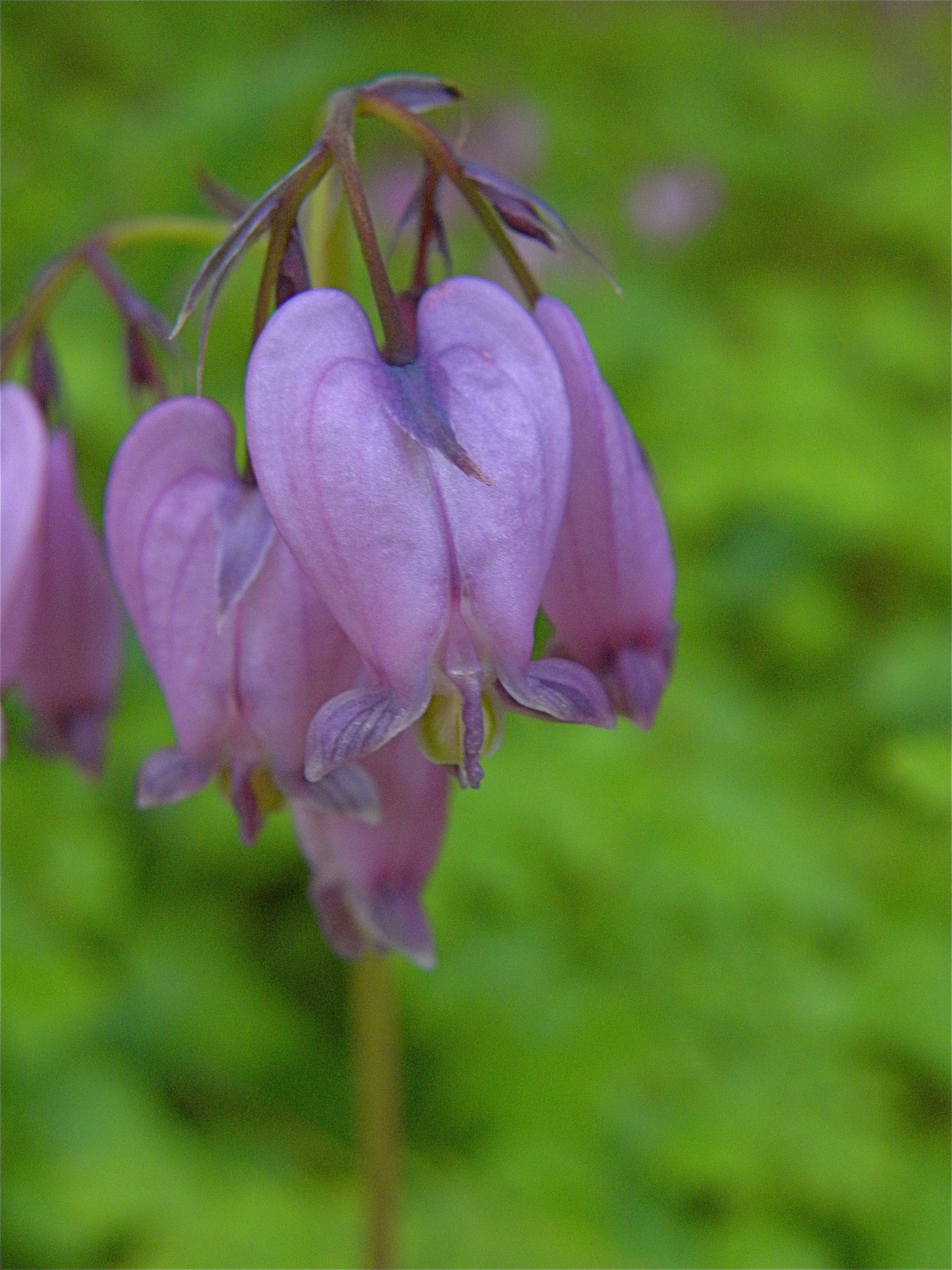
Flower cluster

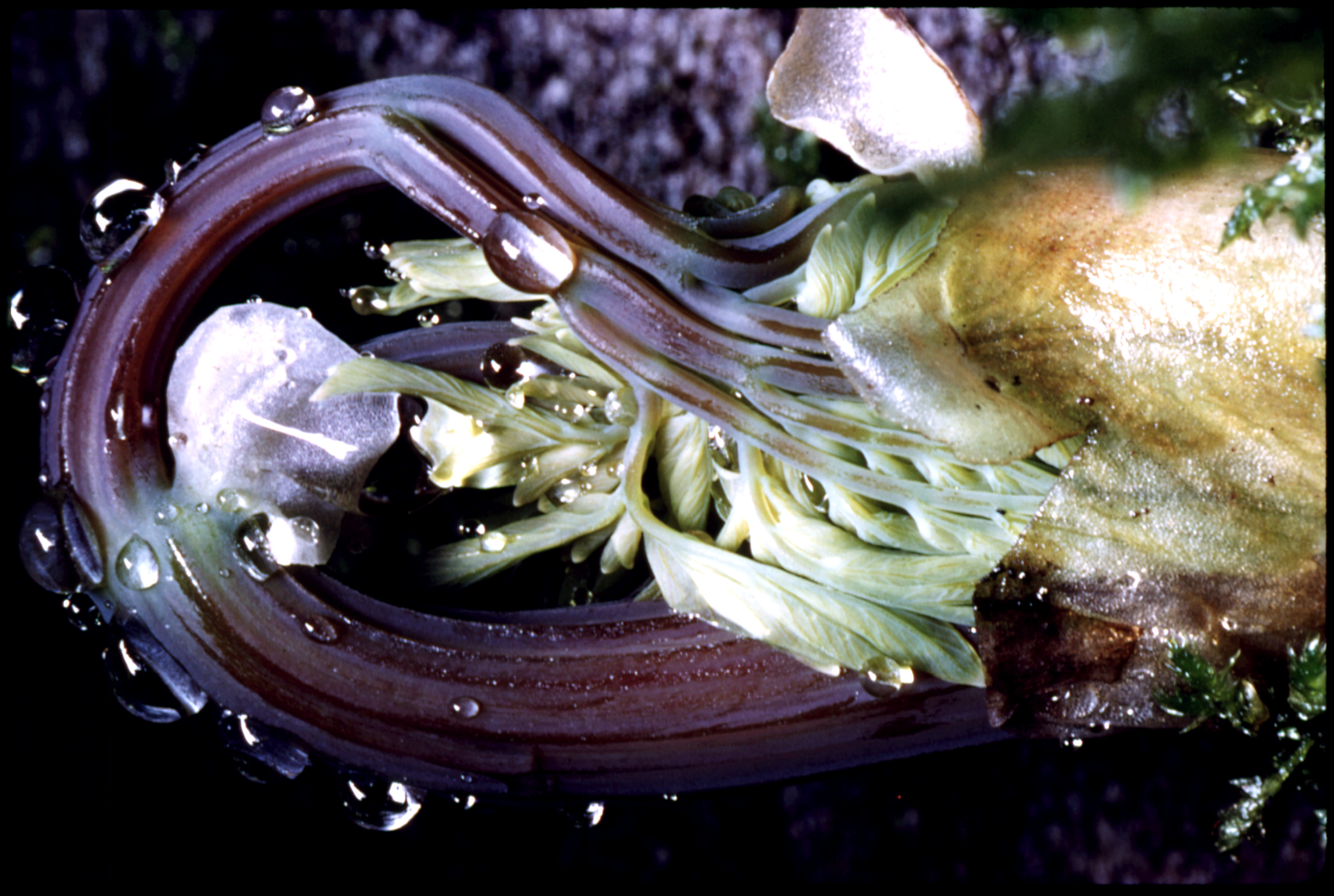
Leaves unfurling from a bud

== Ecology ==
The Pacific bleeding-heart is native to moist woodland, forest, and streambanks from California to British Columbia, from sea level to the subalpine zone.

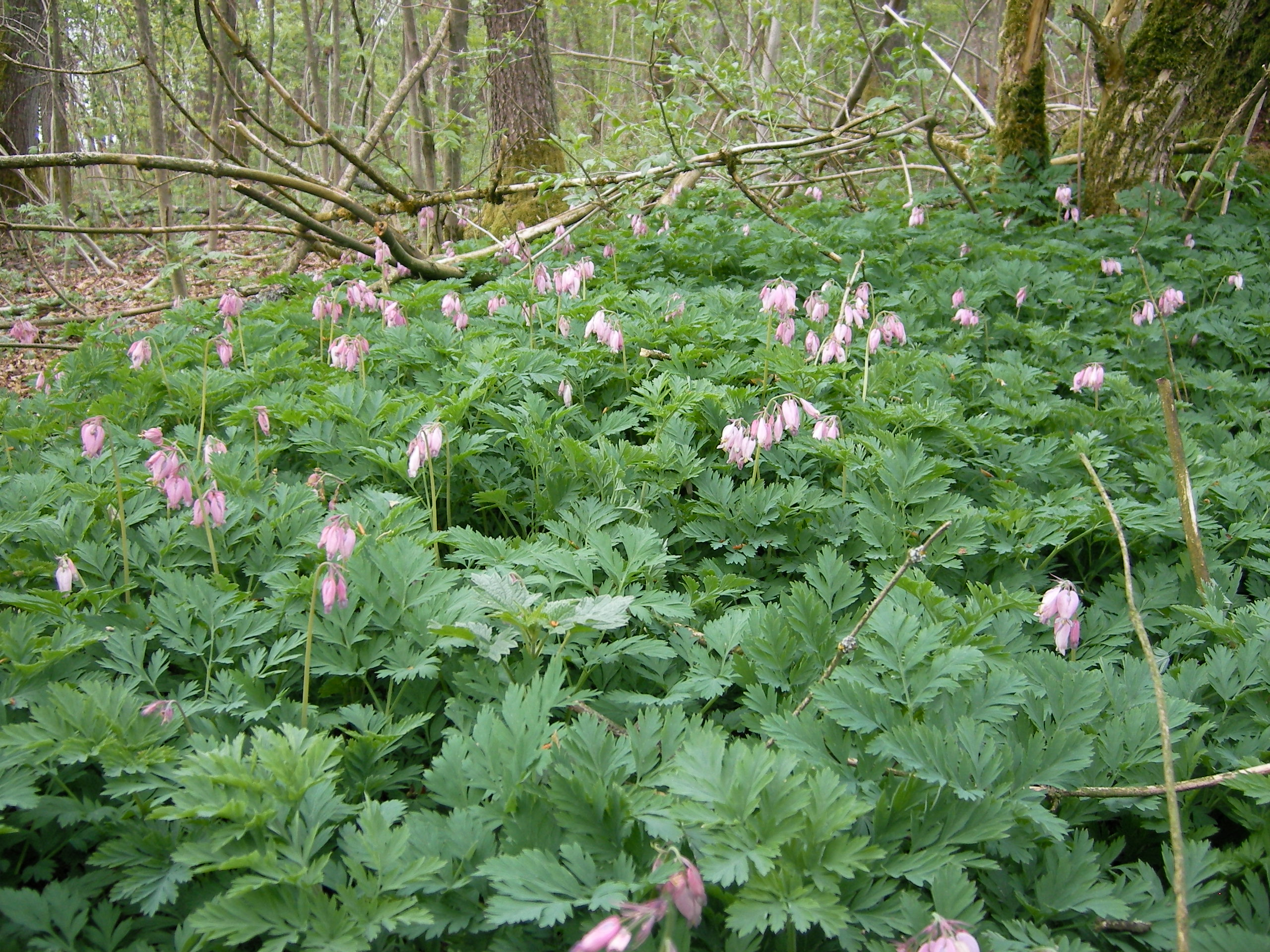
A colony of plants

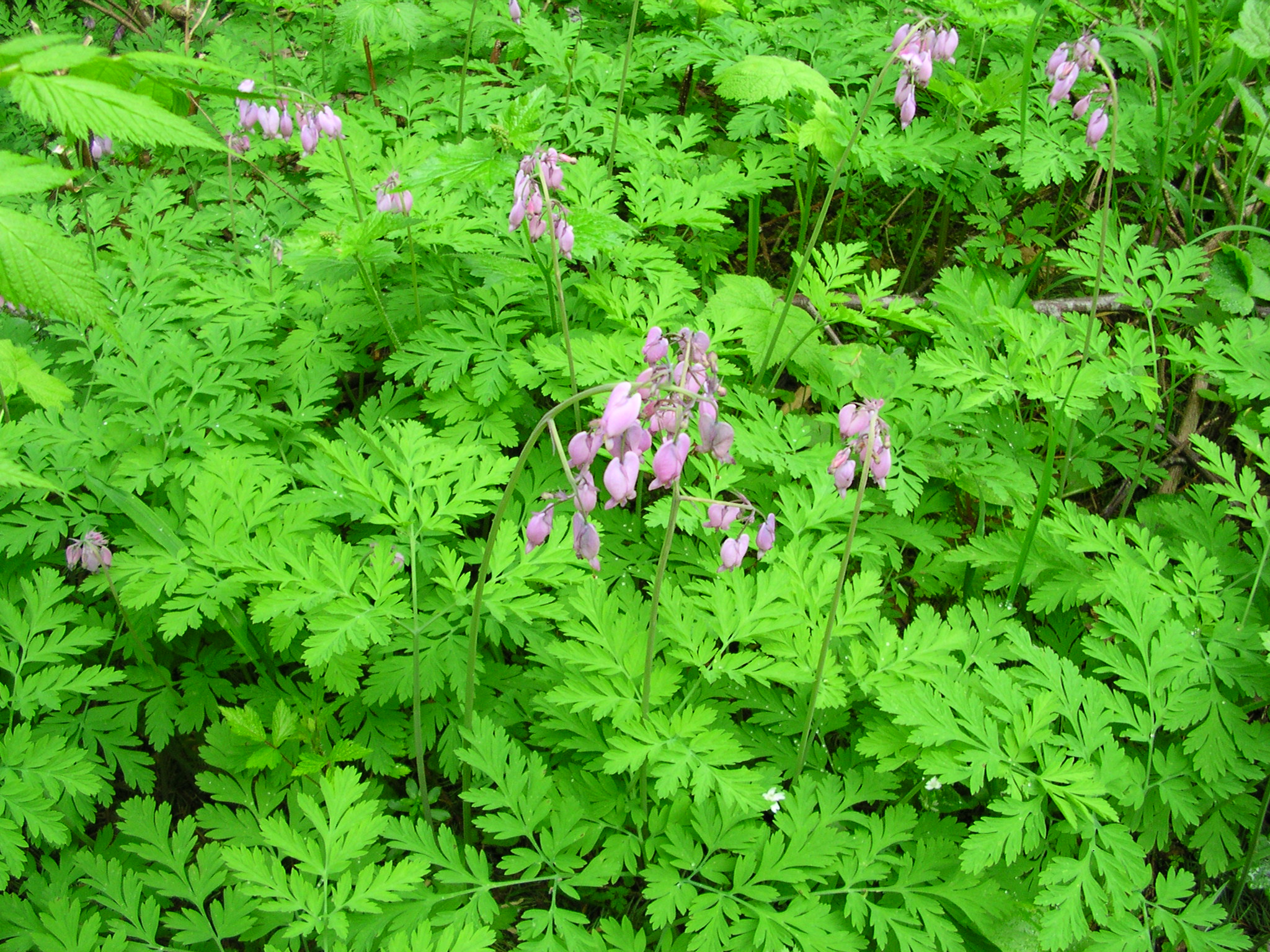
Wild plants on the Iron Horse Regional Trail in the Bay Area, California

== History of cultivation ==
The Pacific bleeding-heart (Dicentra formosa subsp. formosa) was first noted by Europeans when the Scottish surgeon and naturalist Archibald Menzies encountered it on the Vancouver Expedition. Menzies collected seed in 1792 in Nootka Sound, and gave it to the Royal Botanic Gardens at Kew in 1795. From there, seed made its way into cultivation in Europe. It apparently was not cultivated in the United States until 1835, when William Kenrick began selling the plant in Boston. The subspecies oregana was first cultivated around 1932, when it was offered by Borsch and Sons in Oregon, but is not grown very often.

== Cultivars ==
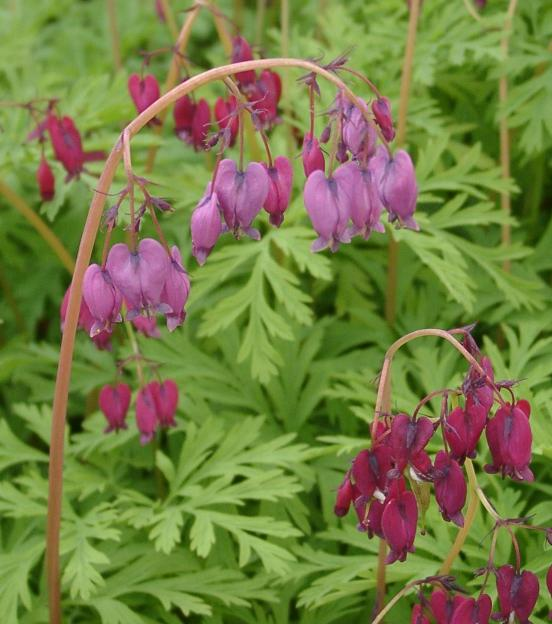
Dicentra formosa 'Bacchanal'

Dicentra formosa is widely grown as a garden plant, and several cultivars have been developed. Those marked agm have gained the Royal Horticultural Society's Award of Garden Merit:

- white and green flowers
  - 'Langtrees' (= 'Pearl Drops') – bluish-green leaves
  - 'Margaret Fish' – bluish-gray-green
  - 'Quicksilver' – bluish-gray-green – resentful of hot, humid climates and sun
  - 'Snowflakes' (= 'Fusd') – green
  - 'Sweetheart' – green
- pink and red flowers
  - 'Bacchanal' agm – deep red flowers
  - 'Coldham' – deep burgundy
  - 'Luxuriant' agm – red flowers
  - 'Zestful' – deep rose-pink

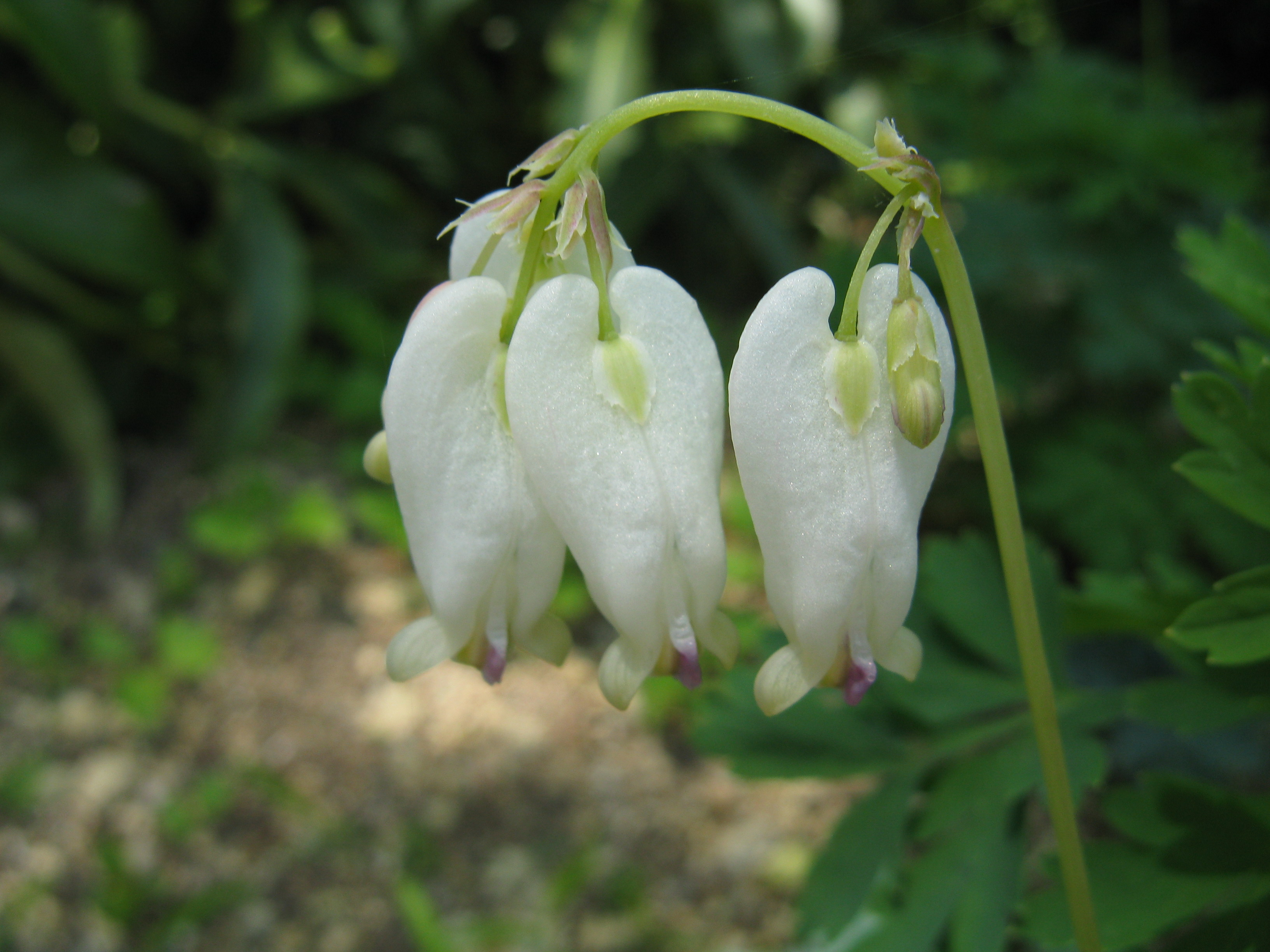
Dicentra 'Aurora'

There are several hybrid cultivars involving D. formosa, the eastern American species D. eximia and the Japanese species D. peregrina:

- 'Adrian Bloom' (from a seedling of D. 'Bountiful') – dark pink flowers, bluish-green leaves
- 'Aurora' (D. formosa × D. eximia) – pure white, gray-green – particularly tolerant of hot-humid climates
- 'Bountiful' (D. formosa subsp. oregana × D. eximia) – rosy red, bluish-green
- 'Gothenburg' (D. formosa subsp. oregana × D. peregrina f. alba) – light pink, compact
- 'King of Hearts' – D. peregrina × (D. formosa subsp. oregana × D. eximia) – pink, bluish-gray-green
- 'Silversmith' (D. formosa subsp. oregana × D. eximia) – white pink-tinted, green
- 'Stuart Boothman' agm (D. formosa subsp. oregana × D. eximia) – deep pink, gray-green
