= 2024 Monoposto Championship =

2024 formula racing championship

The 2024 Monoposto Championship was the 32nd season of the multi-class open wheel championship held by the Monoposto Racing Club across Great Britain.

79 drivers competed across the championship's eight classes, with the season starting on 20 April at Snetterton Circuit and concluded on 12 October at Oulton Park after 14 races in the main season and three non-championship races.

George Line and Ashley Dibden became F3 champions, with Line taking the F3A title and Dibden winning in F3B. The other Mono classes were won by Alex Bagnall (Mono 1600), Sam Donn (Mono 1800), Tom Wheatley (Mono 2000) and Will Cox (Mono 2000 Classic). Championship titles in the two Moto classes were shared by Matthew Haughton (Moto 1000) and Jason Timms (Moto 1400).

== Race calendar ==
The series did not return to Anglesey Circuit in Wales, instead opting for a round at Croft Circuit. The 2024 schedule consisted of 14 races: two races per round, with three at the Snetterton and Croft rounds. The championship also held a non-championship invitational round overseas in Ireland.

Round		Circuit	Date	Support bill	Map of circuit locations
1		(United Kingdom) Snetterton Circuit, Snetterton; 200 Circuit	20 April	Historic Sports Car Championship; Northern Saloon & Sports Car Championship; Classic Formula Ford; Historic Formula Ford	2024 Monoposto Championship is located in British Isles
2		(United Kingdom) Snetterton Circuit, Snetterton; 200 Circuit	21 April	Historic Sports Car Championship; Northern Saloon & Sports Car Championship; Classic Formula Ford; Historic Formula Ford	2024 Monoposto Championship is located in British Isles
3		(United Kingdom) Snetterton Circuit, Snetterton; 200 Circuit	21 April	Historic Sports Car Championship; Northern Saloon & Sports Car Championship; Classic Formula Ford; Historic Formula Ford	2024 Monoposto Championship is located in British Isles
4		(United Kingdom) Brands Hatch, West Kingsdown; Grand Prix Circuit	19 May	GT Cup Championship; Porsche Club Championship	2024 Monoposto Championship is located in British Isles
5		(United Kingdom) Brands Hatch, West Kingsdown; Grand Prix Circuit	19 May	GT Cup Championship; Porsche Club Championship	2024 Monoposto Championship is located in British Isles
6		(United Kingdom) Silverstone Circuit, Silverstone; Grand Prix Circuit	8 June	Equipe Summer Classic; GT & Sports Car Cup	2024 Monoposto Championship is located in British Isles
7		(United Kingdom) Silverstone Circuit, Silverstone; Grand Prix Circuit	9 June	Equipe Summer Classic; GT & Sports Car Cup	2024 Monoposto Championship is located in British Isles
NC	1	(Republic of Ireland) Mondello Park, Caragh; International Circuit	6 July	Irish Touring Cars Championship; Formula BOSS Ireland Championship; Irish Legends; Formula Vee	2024 Monoposto Championship is located in British Isles
NC	2	(Republic of Ireland) Mondello Park, Caragh; International Circuit	7 July	Irish Touring Cars Championship; Formula BOSS Ireland Championship; Irish Legends; Formula Vee	2024 Monoposto Championship is located in British Isles
NC	3	(Republic of Ireland) Mondello Park, Caragh; International Circuit	7 July	Irish Touring Cars Championship; Formula BOSS Ireland Championship; Irish Legends; Formula Vee	2024 Monoposto Championship is located in British Isles
8		(United Kingdom) Croft Circuit, North Yorkshire; Main Circuit	24 August	Battle of Britain Race; Northern Saloon & Sports Car Championship; Porsche Club Championship; Focus Cup	2024 Monoposto Championship is located in British Isles
9		(United Kingdom) Croft Circuit, North Yorkshire; Main Circuit	25 August	Battle of Britain Race; Northern Saloon & Sports Car Championship; Porsche Club Championship; Focus Cup	2024 Monoposto Championship is located in British Isles
10		(United Kingdom) Croft Circuit, North Yorkshire; Main Circuit	25 August	Battle of Britain Race; Northern Saloon & Sports Car Championship; Porsche Club Championship; Focus Cup	2024 Monoposto Championship is located in British Isles
11		(United Kingdom) Donington Park, Castle Donington; Grand Prix Circuit	15 September	GT Cup Championship; Porsche Club Championship	2024 Monoposto Championship is located in British Isles
12		(United Kingdom) Donington Park, Castle Donington; Grand Prix Circuit	15 September	GT Cup Championship; Porsche Club Championship	2024 Monoposto Championship is located in British Isles
13		(United Kingdom) Oulton Park, Little Budworth; International Circuit	12 October	Mini Enduro; Junior Saloon Car Championship	2024 Monoposto Championship is located in British Isles
14		(United Kingdom) Oulton Park, Little Budworth; International Circuit	12 October	Mini Enduro; Junior Saloon Car Championship	2024 Monoposto Championship is located in British Isles

== F3 Classes ==
=== Drivers ===
For 2024, the F3 class was split into two classes according to the engine used. The F3 A class was reserved for cars utilizing newer, F3-spec engines while the F3 B class remained open for all older F3 engines as well as F4 engines.

No.	Driver	Car	Engine	Rounds
F3 A entries
9	(United Kingdom) Tony Bishop	Dallara F308/11	VW Spiess	1–7, 11–12, NC
18	(United Kingdom) Nigel Howard	Dallara F310	VW Spiess	11–14
20	(United Kingdom) Louise Deason	Dallara F310	VW Spiess	1–5, NC
22	(United Kingdom) Dean Warren	Dallara F305	VW	1–7, 11–12
48	(United Kingdom) Jasmine Shaw	Dallara F308	HWA	1–3, NC
51	(United Kingdom) George Line	Dallara F308	VW Spiess	All
54	(Republic of Ireland) Brendan O'Brien	Dallara F311	VW	1, 4
54	(Republic of Ireland) Karl O'Brien	Dallara F311	VW	2–3, 5–7, NC
78	(Republic of Ireland) Thomas Callan	Dallara F305	Mugen	1–7, NC
79	(United Kingdom) Andrew Pryke	Dallara F305	Mercedes	11–12
88	(United Kingdom) Chris Woodhouse	Dallara F308	Mercedes	1–3
89	(United Kingdom) James Williams	Dallara F311	VW	All
F3 B entries
10	(United Kingdom) Neil Harrison	Dallara F398	Vauxhall	1–7, 11–14
17	(United Kingdom) Ameet Patel	Dallara F399	TOM'S	4–5
18	(United Kingdom) Nigel Howard	Dallara F302	TOM'S	1–3, NC
36	(United Kingdom) Mike Hatton	Dallara F307	Toyota	4–5
38	(United Kingdom) Tom Roper	Dallara F399	Vauxhall	7
59	(United Kingdom) Ben Stiles	Dallara F300	Opel Spiess	1–3
63	(United Kingdom) Kevin Otway	Dallara F304	Toyota	1–7, NC
66	(United Kingdom) Jamie Molloy	Tatuus FR	Renault	1–3, 6–14
68	(United Kingdom) Malcolm Scott	Dallara F398	Vauxhall	All
69	(United Kingdom) Kevan McLurg	Dallara F397	Vauxhall	6–7, 11–12
75	(United Kingdom) Thomas Hill	Dallara F302	Vauxhall	8–14
77	(United Kingdom) Nigel Davers	Dallara F302	Toyota	4–7
86	(United Kingdom) Chun Cheong Ip	Dallara F307	Toyota	All
90	(United Kingdom) Lee Cunningham	Dallara F301	Renault	All
91	(United Kingdom) Adrian Holey	Dallara F397	Toyota	11–12
94	(United Kingdom) Ashley Dibden	Dallara F307	Toyota	1–10
157	(United Kingdom) Chris Levy	Dallara F397	Vauxhall	1–3, 6–7, 11–12

=== Race results ===
Round		Circuit	Pole position	F3A		F3B	
Round		Circuit	Pole position	Fastest lap	Winning driver	Fastest lap	Winning driver
R1		(United Kingdom) Snetterton Circuit	(United Kingdom) George Line	(United Kingdom) George Line	(United Kingdom) George Line	(United Kingdom) Ashley Dibden	(United Kingdom) Ashley Dibden
R2		(United Kingdom) Snetterton Circuit	(United Kingdom) George Line	(United Kingdom) George Line	(United Kingdom) Tony Bishop	(United Kingdom) Ashley Dibden	(United Kingdom) Ashley Dibden
R3		(United Kingdom) Snetterton Circuit	(United Kingdom) George Line	(United Kingdom) Tony Bishop	(United Kingdom) George Line	(United Kingdom) Ashley Dibden	(United Kingdom) Ashley Dibden
R4		(United Kingdom) Brands Hatch	(United Kingdom) George Line	(United Kingdom) George Line	(United Kingdom) George Line	(United Kingdom) Lee Cunningham	(United Kingdom) Lee Cunningham
R5		(United Kingdom) Brands Hatch	(United Kingdom) George Line	(United Kingdom) George Line	(United Kingdom) George Line	(United Kingdom) Ashley Dibden	(United Kingdom) Ashley Dibden
R6		(United Kingdom) Silverstone Circuit	(United Kingdom) George Line	(United Kingdom) Tony Bishop	(United Kingdom) George Line	(United Kingdom) Ashley Dibden	(United Kingdom) Ashley Dibden
R7		(United Kingdom) Silverstone Circuit	(United Kingdom) Tony Bishop	(United Kingdom) Tony Bishop	(United Kingdom) George Line	(United Kingdom) Ashley Dibden	(United Kingdom) Lee Cunningham
NC	1	(Republic of Ireland) Mondello Park	(Republic of Ireland) Karl O'Brien	(Republic of Ireland) Karl O'Brien	(Republic of Ireland) Karl O'Brien	no entries	
NC	2	(Republic of Ireland) Mondello Park	no starters			no entries	
NC	3	(Republic of Ireland) Mondello Park	no starters			no entries	
R8		(United Kingdom) Croft Circuit	(United Kingdom) George Line	(United Kingdom) George Line	(United Kingdom) George Line	(United Kingdom) Ashley Dibden	(United Kingdom) Ashley Dibden
R9		(United Kingdom) Croft Circuit	(United Kingdom) George Line	(United Kingdom) George Line	(United Kingdom) George Line	(United Kingdom) Ashley Dibden	(United Kingdom) Chun Cheong Ip
R10		(United Kingdom) Croft Circuit	(United Kingdom) George Line	(United Kingdom) George Line	(United Kingdom) George Line	(United Kingdom) Ashley Dibden	(United Kingdom) Ashley Dibden
R11		(United Kingdom) Donington Park	(United Kingdom) Tony Bishop	(United Kingdom) George Line	(United Kingdom) George Line	(United Kingdom) Lee Cunningham	(United Kingdom) Lee Cunningham
R12		(United Kingdom) Donington Park	(United Kingdom) George Line	(United Kingdom) George Line	(United Kingdom) George Line	(United Kingdom) Chun Cheong Ip	(United Kingdom) Ashley Dibden
R13		(United Kingdom) Oulton Park	(United Kingdom) George Line	(United Kingdom) George Line	(United Kingdom) George Line	(United Kingdom) Chun Cheong Ip	(United Kingdom) Lee Cunningham
R14		(United Kingdom) Oulton Park	(United Kingdom) George Line	(United Kingdom) George Line	(United Kingdom) George Line	(United Kingdom) Lee Cunningham	(United Kingdom) Chun Cheong Ip

=== Championship standings ===
Points were awarded as follows:

Position	**1st**	**2nd**	**3rd**	**4th**	**5th**	**6th**	**7th**	**8th**	**9th**	**10th**	**11th**	**12th+**	**F.L.**
Points	15	12	10	9	8	7	6	5	4	3	2	1	1

Each driver's three worst results were dropped.

Pos	Driver	SNE (United Kingdom)			BRH (United Kingdom)		SIL (United Kingdom)		MON (Republic of Ireland)			CRO (United Kingdom)			DON (United Kingdom)		OUL (United Kingdom)		Pts
Pos	Driver	R1	R2	R3	R4	R5	R6	R7	NC			R8	R9	R10	R11	R12	R13	R14	Pts
F3 A standings
1	(United Kingdom) George Line	**1**	(**Ret**)	(**1**)	**1**	**1**	(**1**)	1				**1**	**1**	**1**	1	**1**	**1**	**1**	175
2	(United Kingdom) James Williams	2	2	(4)	3	3	(Ret)	(4)				2	2	2	3	3	2	2	124
3	(United Kingdom) Tony Bishop	3	1	2	2	2	2	**2**	DNS	DNS	DNS				**2**	2			112
4	(United Kingdom) Dean Warren	4	4	6	Ret	5	Ret	5							4	4			59
5	(Republic of Ireland) Thomas Callan	8	6	7	5	6	4	6	WD	WD	WD								49
6	(United Kingdom) Louise Deason	6	5	5	4	4			WD	WD	WD								41
7	(Republic of Ireland) Karl O'Brien		3	3			3	3	**1**	DNS	DNS								40
8	(United Kingdom) Nigel Howard														6	6	3	3	34
9	(United Kingdom) Andrew Pryke														5	5			16
10	(Republic of Ireland) Brendan O'Brien	5			Ret	DNS													8
11	(United Kingdom) Jasmine Shaw	7	DNS	Ret					WD	WD	WD								6
—	(United Kingdom) Chris Woodhouse	WD	WD	WD															0
F3 B standings
1	(United Kingdom) Ashley Dibden	1	1	1	2	1	1	2				1	2	1					150
2	(United Kingdom) Lee Cunningham	(DNS)	(4)	2	1	2	(8)	1				3	DSQ	2	1	1	1	2	136
3	(United Kingdom) Chun Cheong Ip	2	2	(3)	3	(4)	2	(Ret)				2	1	3	2	2	2	1	136
4	(United Kingdom) Malcolm Scott	(Ret)	(WD)	(WD)	6	5	5	4				4	3	4	5	3	3	4	97
5	(United Kingdom) Neil Harrison	3	5	4	5	DNS	4	3							3	4	WD	WD	73
6	(United Kingdom) Jamie Molloy	7	8	6			10	8				5	4	5	7	6	4	Ret	73
7	(United Kingdom) Thomas Hill											DNS	5	6	6	5	DNS	3	40
8	(United Kingdom) Kevin Otway	5	6	5	Ret	Ret	6	7	WD	WD	WD								36
9	(United Kingdom) Chris Levy	4	3	DNS			3	Ret							Ret	DNS			29
10	(United Kingdom) Kevan McLurg						7	6							4	Ret			22
11	(United Kingdom) Mike Hatton				4	3													19
12	(United Kingdom) Nigel Howard	6	7	DNS					WD	WD	WD								13
13	(United Kingdom) Nigel Davers				Ret	Ret	9	5											12
14	(United Kingdom) Ameet Patel				Ret	6													7
15	(United Kingdom) Tom Roper							9											4
—	(United Kingdom) Adrian Holey														Ret	DNS			0
—	(United Kingdom) Ben Stiles	WD	WD	WD															0
Pos	Driver	R1	R2	R3	R4	R5	R6	R7	NC			R8	R9	R10	R11	R12	R13	R14	Pts
Pos	Driver	SNE (United Kingdom)			BRH (United Kingdom)		SIL (United Kingdom)		MON (Republic of Ireland)			CRO (United Kingdom)			DON (United Kingdom)		OUL (United Kingdom)		Pts

Colour	Result
Gold	Winner
Silver	Second place
Bronze	Third place
Green	Points classification
Blue	Non-points classification
Blue	Non-classified finish (NC)
Purple	Retired, not classified (Ret)
Red	Did not qualify (DNQ)
Red	Did not pre-qualify (DNPQ)
Black	Disqualified (DSQ)
White	Did not start (DNS)
White	Withdrew (WD)
White	Race cancelled (C)
Blank	Did not practice (DNP)
Blank	Did not arrive (DNA)
Blank	Excluded (EX)

**Bold** – Pole

Italics – Fastest Lap

† — Did not finish, but classified

== Mono Classes ==
=== Drivers ===
No.	Driver	Car	Engine	Rounds
Mono 1600 entries
4	(United Kingdom) Joe Goodwin	Formula Renault 1990	Renault	1–3, 6–10
13	(United Kingdom) Kyle Wallace	Formula Renault 1992	Renault	1–12, NC
38	(United Kingdom) Tom Roper	Mygale SJ02		6
42	(United Kingdom) Alexander Bagnall	Formula Vauxhall Junior	Vauxhall	All
45	(United Kingdom) Felix Baggott	Mygale FF		11–12, 14
Mono 1800 entries
12	(United Kingdom) Phil Davis	Van Diemen RF98	Ford Zetec	1–5, 8–10, NC
47	(United Kingdom) David Jones	Van Diemen RF82	Ford Pinto	1–3, 6–7, 11–14
60	(United Kingdom) Matt Hayes	Jamun M97Z	Ford Zetec	1–5
61	(United Kingdom) Julian Hoskins	Vector TF93Z	Ford Zetec	All
73	(United Kingdom) Sam Donn	Mygale SJ02	Ford Zetec	All
Mono 2000 entries
14	(United Kingdom) Robert Smith	Dallara F395	Vauxhall	1–3
21	(United Kingdom) Ian Hughes	Dallara F393	Renault	1–5, NC
26	(United Kingdom) Bryn Tootell	Van Diemen RF01	Ford Zetec	13–14
32	(United Kingdom) Terry Clark	Van Diemen RF00	Ford Zetec	6–14, NC
41	(Switzerland) Damon Bland	Van Diemen RF01	Ford Zetec	1–3, 11–12
56	(United Kingdom) Tom Wheatley	Van Diemen RF99 F4	Ford Zetec	All, NC
71	(United Kingdom) Chris Kite	Dallara F393	Ford Zetec	1–7, 11–12
75	(United Kingdom) Thomas Hill	Swift FR96	Renault	1–7
83	(United Kingdom) David Spencer	Reynard 883	Vauxhall	11–12
98	(United Kingdom) Rodney Toft	TOM'S Toyota 36F	Toyota	1–3, 6–7, 11–12
99	(United Kingdom) Mat Jordan	Van Diemen RF99 F4	Ford Zetec	All
Mono 2000 Classic entries
19	(United Kingdom) Nick Catanzaro	Formula Vauxhall Lotus	Vauxhall	1–3, 6–14, NC
25	(United Kingdom) Jim Spencer	Reynard 883	VW	6–14
44	(United Kingdom) Will Cox	Ralt RT3	Vauxhall C20XE	All
46	(United Kingdom) Jared Wood	Formula Vauxhall Lotus	Vauxhall	4–5, 13–14
50	(United Kingdom) Chris Hodgen	Chevron B38	Toyota Novamotor	6–7
52	(United Kingdom) Phil Chappell	Formula Vauxhall Lotus	Vauxhall C20XE	All
57	(United Kingdom) Edward Guest	Anson SA4	Vauxhall C20XE	11–12
64	(United Kingdom) Marcus Sheard	Reynard 883	Toyota 3S-GE	1–5, 8–10
76	(United Kingdom) Richard Biles	Formula Vauxhall Lotus	Vauxhall C20XE	1–3, 11–14, NC

=== Race results ===
Round		Circuit	Pole position	Mono 1600		Mono 1800		Mono 2000		Mono 2000 Classic	
Round		Circuit	Pole position	Fastest lap	Winning driver	Fastest lap	Winning driver	Fastest lap	Winning driver	Fastest lap	Winning driver
R1		(United Kingdom) Snetterton Circuit	(United Kingdom) Tom Wheatley	(United Kingdom) Alexander Bagnall	(United Kingdom) Joe Goodwin	(United Kingdom) Phil Davis	(United Kingdom) Sam Donn	(United Kingdom) Tom Wheatley	(United Kingdom) Tom Wheatley	(United Kingdom) Will Cox	(United Kingdom) Will Cox
R2		(United Kingdom) Snetterton Circuit	(United Kingdom) Will Cox	(United Kingdom) Alexander Bagnall	(United Kingdom) Alexander Bagnall	(United Kingdom) Sam Donn	(United Kingdom) Phil Davis	(United Kingdom) Tom Wheatley	(United Kingdom) Tom Wheatley	(United Kingdom) Will Cox	(United Kingdom) Will Cox
R3		(United Kingdom) Snetterton Circuit	(United Kingdom) Will Cox	(United Kingdom) Alexander Bagnall	(United Kingdom) Alexander Bagnall	(United Kingdom) Phil Davis	(United Kingdom) Phil Davis	(United Kingdom) Tom Wheatley	(United Kingdom) Ian Hughes	(United Kingdom) Will Cox	(United Kingdom) Will Cox
R4		(United Kingdom) Brands Hatch	(United Kingdom) Will Cox	(United Kingdom) Alexander Bagnall	(United Kingdom) Alexander Bagnall	(United Kingdom) Sam Donn	(United Kingdom) Sam Donn	(United Kingdom) Mat Jordan	(United Kingdom) Mat Jordan	(United Kingdom) Will Cox	(United Kingdom) Will Cox
R5		(United Kingdom) Brands Hatch	(United Kingdom) Will Cox	(United Kingdom) Alexander Bagnall	(United Kingdom) Alexander Bagnall	(United Kingdom) Sam Donn	(United Kingdom) Julian Hoskins	(United Kingdom) Tom Wheatley	(United Kingdom) Tom Wheatley	(United Kingdom) Will Cox	(United Kingdom) Will Cox
R6		(United Kingdom) Silverstone Circuit	(United Kingdom) Tom Wheatley	(United Kingdom) Alexander Bagnall	(United Kingdom) Alexander Bagnall	(United Kingdom) Sam Donn	(United Kingdom) Sam Donn	(United Kingdom) Tom Wheatley	(United Kingdom) Tom Wheatley	(United Kingdom) Will Cox	(United Kingdom) Chris Hodgen
R7		(United Kingdom) Silverstone Circuit	(United Kingdom) Tom Wheatley	(United Kingdom) Alexander Bagnall	(United Kingdom) Alexander Bagnall	(United Kingdom) Julian Hoskins	(United Kingdom) Julian Hoskins	(United Kingdom) Tom Wheatley	(United Kingdom) Tom Wheatley	(United Kingdom) Will Cox	(United Kingdom) Will Cox
NC	1	(Republic of Ireland) Mondello Park	(United Kingdom) Terry Clark	no starters				(United Kingdom) Terry Clark	(United Kingdom) Terry Clark	(United Kingdom) Nick Catanzaro	(United Kingdom) Nick Catanzaro
NC	2	(Republic of Ireland) Mondello Park	(United Kingdom) Terry Clark	no starters				(United Kingdom) Terry Clark	(United Kingdom) Terry Clark	(United Kingdom) Richard Biles	(United Kingdom) Nick Catanzaro
NC	3	(Republic of Ireland) Mondello Park	(United Kingdom) Terry Clark	no starters				(United Kingdom) Terry Clark	(United Kingdom) Terry Clark	(United Kingdom) Richard Biles	(United Kingdom) Nick Catanzaro
R8		(United Kingdom) Croft Circuit	(United Kingdom) Will Cox	(United Kingdom) Alexander Bagnall	(United Kingdom) Alexander Bagnall	(United Kingdom) Phil Davis	(United Kingdom) Phil Davis	(United Kingdom) Tom Wheatley	(United Kingdom) Tom Wheatley	(United Kingdom) Will Cox	(United Kingdom) Will Cox
R9		(United Kingdom) Croft Circuit	(United Kingdom) Will Cox	(United Kingdom) Alexander Bagnall	(United Kingdom) Alexander Bagnall	(United Kingdom) Phil Davis	(United Kingdom) Phil Davis	(United Kingdom) Tom Wheatley	(United Kingdom) Terry Clark	(United Kingdom) Will Cox	(United Kingdom) Will Cox
R10		(United Kingdom) Croft Circuit	(United Kingdom) Will Cox	(United Kingdom) Alexander Bagnall	(United Kingdom) Alexander Bagnall	(United Kingdom) Phil Davis	(United Kingdom) Sam Donn	(United Kingdom) Terry Clark	(United Kingdom) Terry Clark	(United Kingdom) Marcus Sheard	(United Kingdom) Marcus Sheard
R11		(United Kingdom) Donington Park	(United Kingdom) Tom Wheatley	(United Kingdom) Alexander Bagnall	(United Kingdom) Alexander Bagnall	(United Kingdom) Julian Hoskins	(United Kingdom) Julian Hoskins	(United Kingdom) Tom Wheatley	(United Kingdom) Tom Wheatley	(United Kingdom) Will Cox	(United Kingdom) Will Cox
R12		(United Kingdom) Donington Park	(United Kingdom) Tom Wheatley	(United Kingdom) Alexander Bagnall	(United Kingdom) Alexander Bagnall	(United Kingdom) Sam Donn	(United Kingdom) Julian Hoskins	(United Kingdom) Tom Wheatley	(United Kingdom) Terry Clark	(United Kingdom) Will Cox	(United Kingdom) Will Cox
R13		(United Kingdom) Oulton Park	(United Kingdom) Will Cox	(United Kingdom) Alexander Bagnall	(United Kingdom) Alexander Bagnall	(United Kingdom) Sam Donn	(United Kingdom) Sam Donn	(United Kingdom) Terry Clark	(United Kingdom) Terry Clark	(United Kingdom) Will Cox	(United Kingdom) Will Cox
R14		(United Kingdom) Oulton Park	(United Kingdom) Will Cox	(United Kingdom) Alexander Bagnall	(United Kingdom) Alexander Bagnall	(United Kingdom) Julian Hoskins	(United Kingdom) Sam Donn	(United Kingdom) Terry Clark	(United Kingdom) Terry Clark	(United Kingdom) Will Cox	(United Kingdom) Will Cox

=== Championship standings ===
Points were awarded as follows:

Position	**1st**	**2nd**	**3rd**	**4th**	**5th**	**6th**	**7th**	**8th**	**9th**	**10th**	**11th**	**12th+**	**F.L.**
Points	15	12	10	9	8	7	6	5	4	3	2	1	1

Each driver's three worst results were dropped.

Pos	Driver	SNE (United Kingdom)			BRH (United Kingdom)		SIL (United Kingdom)		MON (Republic of Ireland)			CRO (United Kingdom)			DON (United Kingdom)		OUL (United Kingdom)		Pts
Pos	Driver	R1	R2	R3	R4	R5	R6	R7	NC			R8	R9	R10	R11	R12	R13	R14	Pts
Mono 1600 standings
1	(United Kingdom) Alexander Bagnall	(Ret)	(1)	(1)	1	1	1	1				1	1	1	1	1	1	1	176
2	(United Kingdom) Kyle Wallace	Ret	2	2	2	2	3	DNS	DNS	DNS	DNS	2	2	2	DNS	(WD)			94
3	(United Kingdom) Joe Goodwin	1	3	3			2	2				3	Ret	DNS					69
4	(United Kingdom) Felix Baggott														2	2		2	36
5	(United Kingdom) Tom Roper						4												9
Mono 1800 standings
1	(United Kingdom) Sam Donn	1	3	2	1	2	1	(Ret)				(3)	(3)	1	2	2	1	1	154
2	(United Kingdom) Julian Hoskins	(2)	(2)	(3)	2	1	2	1				2	2	2	1	1	2	2	147
3	(United Kingdom) David Jones	4	4	4			3	2							3	3	3	3	89
4	(United Kingdom) Phil Davis	3	1	1	DNS	WD			WD	WD	WD	1	1	Ret					75
—	(United Kingdom) Matt Hayes	Ret	Ret	DNS	Ret	WD													0
Mono 2000 standings
1	(United Kingdom) Tom Wheatley	**1**	1	Ret	2	1	**1**	**1**	WD	WD	WD	1	Ret	(DNS)	**1**	**Ret**	(WD)	(WD)	127
2	(United Kingdom) Terry Clark						2	2	**1**	**1**	**1**	3	1	1	3	1	1	1	122
3	(United Kingdom) Mat Jordan	2	(DNS)	(DNS)	1	2	3	3				2	2	(DNS)	2	3	Ret	DNS	106
4	(United Kingdom) Chris Kite	DSQ	5	3	4	3	5	4							DNS	WD			54
5	(United Kingdom) Thomas Hill	5	3	2	DNS	Ret	4	5											47
6	(United Kingdom) Ian Hughes	4	4	1	3	Ret			WD	WD	WD								43
7	(Switzerland) Damon Bland	6	6	Ret											4	2			35
8	(United Kingdom) Robert Smith	3	2	Ret															22
9	(United Kingdom) Rodney Toft	7	DNS	DNS			DNS	6							Ret	DNS			13
—	(United Kingdom) Bryn Tootell																Ret	DNS	0
—	(United Kingdom) David Spencer														WD	WD			0
Mono 2000 Classic standings
1	(United Kingdom) Will Cox	(1)	**1**	**1**	**1**	**1**	(Ret)	1				**1**	**1**	(**DNS**)	1	1	**1**	**1**	176
2	(United Kingdom) Nick Catanzaro	Ret	3	3			3	Ret	1	1	1	2	Ret	(DNS)	3	5	5	4	77
3	(United Kingdom) Phil Chappell	4	4	4	3	Ret	DNS	Ret				(WD)	(WD)	(WD)	4	4	4	3	74
4	(United Kingdom) Marcus Sheard	2	2	2	4	Ret						3	Ret	1					71
5	(United Kingdom) Jim Spencer						2	2				WD	WD	WD	2	3	3	Ret	56
6	(United Kingdom) Richard Biles	3	WD	WD					Ret	2	2				Ret	2	2	2	46
7	(United Kingdom) Jared Wood				2	2											WD	WD	24
8	(United Kingdom) Chris Hodgen						1	DNS											15
—	(United Kingdom) Edward Guest														DNS	WD			0
Pos	Driver	R1	R2	R3	R4	R5	R6	R7	NC			R8	R9	R10	R11	R12	R13	R14	Pts
Pos	Driver	SNE (United Kingdom)			BRH (United Kingdom)		SIL (United Kingdom)		MON (Republic of Ireland)			CRO (United Kingdom)			DON (United Kingdom)		OUL (United Kingdom)		Pts

Colour	Result
Gold	Winner
Silver	Second place
Bronze	Third place
Green	Points classification
Blue	Non-points classification
Blue	Non-classified finish (NC)
Purple	Retired, not classified (Ret)
Red	Did not qualify (DNQ)
Red	Did not pre-qualify (DNPQ)
Black	Disqualified (DSQ)
White	Did not start (DNS)
White	Withdrew (WD)
White	Race cancelled (C)
Blank	Did not practice (DNP)
Blank	Did not arrive (DNA)
Blank	Excluded (EX)

**Bold** – Pole

Italics – Fastest Lap

† — Did not finish, but classified

== Moto Classes ==
=== Drivers ===
No.	Driver	Car	Engine	Rounds
Moto 1000 entries
15	(Republic of Ireland) Brendan O'Brien	Leastone 1000	Suzuki	NC
24	(United Kingdom) Matthew Haughton	Jedi Mk 7	Suzuki K6/7	All
28	(United Kingdom) Bert Chapman	Jedi	Suzuki	6–7
29	(United Kingdom) James Tanser	DSE PR3	Suzuki	4–7
30	(United Kingdom) Andrew Cartmell	Revelation 1000	Honda Fireblade	1–5, 8–10
31	(United Kingdom) Declan Wright	GEM AW3	Yamaha R1	8–14
34	(United Kingdom) David McCalium	Jedi Mk 6	Yamaha	1–3, 6–7, 13–14
37	(United Kingdom) Michael Evangeli	Jedi Mk 6	Yamaha R1	6–7
62	(Canada) David Heavey	Leastone 1000	Suzuki	NC
70	(United Kingdom) Paul Hutson	Jedi Mk 6	Yamaha R1	1–3, 6–14
77	(United Kingdom) Nigel Davers	Jedi Mk 6	BMW	1–3, 8–14, NC
80	(United Kingdom) Dan Gore	Jedi Mk 6/7	Suzuki GSXR	6–7
88	(United Kingdom) Chris Woodhouse	Jedi Mk 6	Suzuki	1–3
91	(United Kingdom) Ryan Thomas	Jedi Mk 6	Suzuki	8–10
95	(United Kingdom) David Tagg	Jedi	Suzuki	6–7
97	(United Kingdom) Eric Cowell	Jedi Mk 6	Suzuki GSXR	11–12
137	(United Kingdom) Michael Frith	Jedi Mk 6/7	Yamaha	8–10
Moto 1400 entries
3	(United Kingdom) Jason Timms	Dallara 301	Suzuki Hayabusa	1–3, 6–14, NC
8	(United Kingdom) Martin Wright	Dallara 301	Suzuki Hayabusa	All, NC
39	(United Kingdom) Oliver Hulme	Hyper Racer X1	Suzuki	4–5
67	(United Kingdom) Andrew Wheals	Dallara 305/7	Suzuki	All

=== Race results ===
Round		Circuit	Pole position	Moto 1000		Moto 1400	
Round		Circuit	Pole position	Fastest lap	Winning driver	Fastest lap	Winning driver
R1		(United Kingdom) Snetterton Circuit	(United Kingdom) Matthew Haughton	(United Kingdom) Matthew Haughton	(United Kingdom) Chris Woodhouse	(United Kingdom) Jason Timms	(United Kingdom) Jason Timms
R2		(United Kingdom) Snetterton Circuit	(United Kingdom) Matthew Haughton	(United Kingdom) Matthew Haughton	(United Kingdom) Matthew Haughton	(United Kingdom) Jason Timms	(United Kingdom) Jason Timms
R3		(United Kingdom) Snetterton Circuit	(United Kingdom) Matthew Haughton	(United Kingdom) Matthew Haughton	(United Kingdom) Matthew Haughton	(United Kingdom) Jason Timms	(United Kingdom) Jason Timms
R4		(United Kingdom) Brands Hatch	(United Kingdom) Matthew Haughton	(United Kingdom) Matthew Haughton	(United Kingdom) Matthew Haughton	(United Kingdom) Martin Wright	(United Kingdom) Martin Wright
R5		(United Kingdom) Brands Hatch	(United Kingdom) Matthew Haughton	(United Kingdom) Matthew Haughton	(United Kingdom) James Tanser	(United Kingdom) Oliver Hulme	(United Kingdom) Martin Wright
R6		(United Kingdom) Silverstone Circuit	(United Kingdom) Matthew Haughton	(United Kingdom) Matthew Haughton	(United Kingdom) Bert Chapman	(United Kingdom) Jason Timms	(United Kingdom) Jason Timms
R7		(United Kingdom) Silverstone Circuit	(United Kingdom) Matthew Haughton	(United Kingdom) Matthew Haughton	(United Kingdom) Matthew Haughton	(United Kingdom) Jason Timms	(United Kingdom) Jason Timms
NC	1	(Republic of Ireland) Mondello Park	(United Kingdom) Jason Timms	(Republic of Ireland) Brendan O'Brien	(Republic of Ireland) Brendan O'Brien	(United Kingdom) Jason Timms	(United Kingdom) Jason Timms
NC	2	(Republic of Ireland) Mondello Park	(United Kingdom) Jason Timms	(Republic of Ireland) Brendan O'Brien	(Canada) David Heavey	(United Kingdom) Jason Timms	(United Kingdom) Jason Timms
NC	3	(Republic of Ireland) Mondello Park	(Canada) David Heavey	(Republic of Ireland) Brendan O'Brien	(Canada) David Heavey	(United Kingdom) Jason Timms	(United Kingdom) Jason Timms
R8		(United Kingdom) Croft Circuit	(United Kingdom) Ryan Thomas	(United Kingdom) Matthew Haughton	(United Kingdom) Matthew Haughton	(United Kingdom) Andrew Wheals	(United Kingdom) Andrew Wheals
R9		(United Kingdom) Croft Circuit	(United Kingdom) Matthew Haughton	(United Kingdom) Matthew Haughton	(United Kingdom) Matthew Haughton	(United Kingdom) Jason Timms	(United Kingdom) Andrew Wheals
R10		(United Kingdom) Croft Circuit	(United Kingdom) Matthew Haughton	(United Kingdom) Matthew Haughton	(United Kingdom) Matthew Haughton	(United Kingdom) Andrew Wheals	(United Kingdom) Andrew Wheals
R11		(United Kingdom) Donington Park	(United Kingdom) Matthew Haughton	(United Kingdom) Nigel Davers	(United Kingdom) Matthew Haughton	(United Kingdom) Jason Timms	(United Kingdom) Jason Timms
R12		(United Kingdom) Donington Park	(United Kingdom) Nigel Davers	(United Kingdom) Matthew Haughton	(United Kingdom) Matthew Haughton	(United Kingdom) Jason Timms	(United Kingdom) Jason Timms
R13		(United Kingdom) Oulton Park	(United Kingdom) Declan Wright	(United Kingdom) Declan Wright	(United Kingdom) David McCalium	(United Kingdom) Jason Timms	(United Kingdom) Jason Timms
R14		(United Kingdom) Oulton Park	(United Kingdom) Declan Wright	(United Kingdom) Declan Wright	(United Kingdom) Declan Wright	(United Kingdom) Martin Wright	(United Kingdom) Jason Timms

=== Championship standings ===
Points were awarded as follows:

Position	**1st**	**2nd**	**3rd**	**4th**	**5th**	**6th**	**7th**	**8th**	**9th**	**10th**	**11th**	**12th+**	**F.L.**
Points	15	12	10	9	8	7	6	5	4	3	2	1	1

Each driver's three worst results were dropped.

Pos	Driver	SNE (United Kingdom)			BRH (United Kingdom)		SIL (United Kingdom)		MON (Republic of Ireland)			CRO (United Kingdom)			DON (United Kingdom)		OUL (United Kingdom)		Pts
Pos	Driver	R1	R2	R3	R4	R5	R6	R7	NC			R8	R9	R10	R11	R12	R13	R14	Pts
Moto 1000 standings
1	(United Kingdom) Matthew Haughton	(**Ret**)	**1**	**1**	**1**	**Ret**	**Ret**	**1**				1	**1**	**1**	**1**	1	(WD)	(WD)	145
2	(United Kingdom) Paul Hutson	2	3	2			3	4				Ret	4	4	5	4	Ret	(DNS)	88
3	(United Kingdom) Declan Wright											3	3	3	4	3	**Ret**	**1**	66
4	(United Kingdom) Andrew Cartmell	3	4	Ret	3	2						4	5	5					66
5	(United Kingdom) David McCalium	4	Ret	Ret			4	5									1	2	53
6	(United Kingdom) Nigel Davers	Ret	Ret	DNS					WD	WD	WD	2	2	2	2	**Ret**	Ret	Ret	49
=7	(United Kingdom) Chris Woodhouse	1	2	DNS															27
=7	(United Kingdom) James Tanser				2	1	WD	WD											27
=7	(United Kingdom) Bert Chapman						1	2											27
=10	(United Kingdom) David Tagg						2	3											22
=10	(United Kingdom) Eric Cowell														3	2			22
12	(United Kingdom) Michael Frith											5	6	6					22
13	(United Kingdom) Michael Evangeli						DNS	6											7
—	(United Kingdom) Ryan Thomas											**Ret**	WD	WD					0
—	(United Kingdom) Dan Gore						WD	WD											0
Non-championship round-only drivers
—	(Canada) David Heavey								2	1	**1**								0
—	(Republic of Ireland) Brendan O'Brien								1	2	2								0
Moto 1400 standings
1	(United Kingdom) Jason Timms	1	1	1			1	1	**1**	**1**	1	Ret	3	(DNS)	1	1	1	1	154
2	(United Kingdom) Martin Wright	(Ret)	(3)	2	1	1	2	2	2	2	2	2	2	2	2	(3)	2	2	140
3	(United Kingdom) Andrew Wheals	2	2	(DNS)	Ret	2	Ret	3				1	1	1	3	2	(WD)	(WD)	115
4	(United Kingdom) Oliver Hulme				DNS	3													11
Pos	Driver	R1	R2	R3	R4	R5	R6	R7	NC			R8	R9	R10	R11	R12	R13	R14	Pts
Pos	Driver	SNE (United Kingdom)			BRH (United Kingdom)		SIL (United Kingdom)		MON (Republic of Ireland)			CRO (United Kingdom)			DON (United Kingdom)		OUL (United Kingdom)		Pts

Colour	Result
Gold	Winner
Silver	Second place
Bronze	Third place
Green	Points classification
Blue	Non-points classification
Blue	Non-classified finish (NC)
Purple	Retired, not classified (Ret)
Red	Did not qualify (DNQ)
Red	Did not pre-qualify (DNPQ)
Black	Disqualified (DSQ)
White	Did not start (DNS)
White	Withdrew (WD)
White	Race cancelled (C)
Blank	Did not practice (DNP)
Blank	Did not arrive (DNA)
Blank	Excluded (EX)

**Bold** – Pole

Italics – Fastest Lap

† — Did not finish, but classified
