= MotorSport Vision Formula Three Cup =

Motor racing series in the United Kingdom

- F3 Cup Logo
- Category: Single seaters
- Country: United Kingdom
- Inaugural season: 1986 (as Toyota F3 Championship)
- Folded: 2022
- Constructors: Dallara; Lola; TOM'S
- Engine suppliers: Opel; Toyota; Renault; Mitsubishi; Mugen Honda; Honda
- Official website: https://www.f3-cup.co.uk/

The MotorSport Vision Formula Three Cup, abbreviated as MSV F3 Cup, was a national motor racing series that took place primarily in the United Kingdom, with a small number of events in mainland Europe. It was a club racing series aimed towards amateur drivers and aspiring racers, and used older generation single-seater Formula Three cars to keep costs low. The F3 Cup had three classes covering cars built between 1981 and 2011. The series was organised by MotorSport Vision, and in 2015 it was the only Formula Three series in the United Kingdom. In 2021, Monoposto Racing Club took over the series, and Hardall International began sponsoring it.

== History ==
The precursor of the MSV F3 Cup was the ARP F3 Championship, which was founded in 1990. It ran for 16 years before being taken over by the British Racing and Sports Car Club (BRSCC). After the transfer, BRSCC renamed ARP F3 as Club F3. In 2009, Club F3 was renamed to BRSCC F3. Later, the championship was saved by MotorSport Vision Racing (MSVR), which is the racing division of MotorSport Vision. In 2011, MSVR renamed BRSCC F3 as MSV F3 Cup and relaunched it.

For 2012, the club obtained championship status and from then on became known as F3 Cup.

In 2021, Monoposto Racing Club took over MSV F3 Cup, and the series was renamed as F3 Cup Championship. Hardall International also began sponsoring the championship.

The 2022 season was cancelled due to a lack of entries and protracted discussions on the composition of the championship.

== Equipment ==
Teams were allowed to use Formula Three chassis built after 1980 but before 2005. This allowed teams to enter with cheaper equipment. The series uses a control tyre which all drivers must use. The tyres are supplied by Avon Tyres, whose parent company supply tyres to the British Formula 3 Championship. Engines would be two-litre, restricted engines, also built between 1981 and 2005.

Due to the mix in ages, and therefore competitiveness of cars, the championship ran three classes.

Formula Three chassis built between 2008 and 2011 were eligible to enter the main championship from 2015.

- Cup Class: For cars and engines built and raced between 1 January 1997 and 31 December 2007, with a maximum engine air restriction of 26 mm (1.0 in) diameter. From 2012, Toyota "Long Life" engines from the European F3 Open (now Euroformula Open Championship) were eligible with a 31 mm (1.2 in) restrictor. Opel "Long Life" engines were also permitted.
- Trophy Class: For cars and engines built and raced between 1 January 1992 and 31 December 1996, with a maximum engine air restriction of up to 26 mm (1.0 in) diameter.
- Masters Class: For cars and any engines built and raced between 1 January 1981 and 31 December 1991, with a maximum engine air restriction of up to 25 mm (0.98 in) diameter.
- Guest Class: for other Formula Three cars joined the series or a single event under permission from the organising team.

== Champions ==
In 2011, F3 Cup was run as a series, not as a championship. There was a prize for the most meritorious driver, which was deemed to be Aaron Steele. The MSA granted F3 Cup championship status for 2012 onwards.

Season	Overall Champion	Cup Class	Trophy Class	Team Champion
2012	(United Kingdom) Chris Dittmann	(United Kingdom) Tristan Cliffe	(United Kingdom) Chris Dittmann	Omicron Motorsport
2013	(United Kingdom) Alex Craven	(United Kingdom) Alex Craven	(United Kingdom) Dave Karaskas	Mark Bailey Racing
2014	(United Kingdom) Toby Sowery	(United Kingdom) Toby Sowery	(Australia) Oliver Rae	Omicron Motorsport
2015	(United Kingdom) Aaron Steele	(United Kingdom) Aaron Steele	(United Kingdom) Adrian Holey	Chris Dittmann Racing
2016	(United Kingdom) George Line	(United Kingdom) George Line	(United Kingdom) James Ledamun	CF Racing
2017	(Italy) Jacopo Sebastiani	(Italy) Jacopo Sebastiani	(United Kingdom) Adrian Holey	CF Racing
2018	(Republic of Ireland) Cian Carey	(Republic of Ireland) Cian Carey	(United Kingdom) Ben Cater	Chris Dittmann Racing
2019	(Republic of Ireland) Cian Carey			CF Racing
2020	(United Kingdom) Stefano Leaney			CF Racing
2021	(United Kingdom) Stefano Leaney	(United Kingdom) Shane Kelly		CF Racing

== Events ==
The championship comprised eight rounds, each with two races. Each race weekend comprised one 20-minute qualifying session and two or three 20-minute or 30-minute races.

The 2021 season featured six rounds, all held in England.

Round	Circuit	Date
1	(United Kingdom) Silverstone National	15–16 May
2	(United Kingdom) Castle Combe	12–13 June
3	(United Kingdom) Oulton Park	24 July
4	(United Kingdom) Brands Hatch Indy	21–22 August
5	(United Kingdom) Donington GP	18–19 September
6	(United Kingdom) Snetterton 300	25 September

== See also ==
- British Formula 3 Championship
- Formula Three
