= 2025 Monoposto Championship =

2025 formula racing championship

The 2025 Monoposto Championship was the 33rd season of the multi-class open wheel championship held by the Monoposto Racing Club across Great Britain.

It began on 5 April at Silverstone Circuit and concluded on 23 August at Donington Park, after 15 races held over six race meetings.

George Line defended his F3 A class title with five races to spare after winning the first nine races in a row in his class. Tom Wheatley meanwhile won the F3 B class title by virtue of his closest competitor Neil Harrison not entering the final round. The other Mono classes were won by Kyle Wallace (Mono 1600), Julian Hoskins (Mono 1800), Mark Harrison (Mono 2000) and Will Cox (Mono 2000 Classic). Matthew Haughton took the Moto 1000 class title, while Andrew Wheals won in the Moto 1400 class.

== Race calendar ==
2025 saw no rounds held at Brands Hatch, Croft Circuit or Oulton Park, with the championship instead returning to Anglesey Circuit in Wales, where it last raced in 2023, and to Thruxton Circuit, where it last raced in 2014. With the non-championship round at Mondello Park also leaving the calendar, all races were held in the United Kingdom.

Round	Circuit	Date	Support bill	Map of circuit locations
1	Silverstone Circuit, Silverstone; International Circuit	5 April	United Formula Ford Championship; Britcar Endurance Championship	2025 Monoposto Championship is located in England
2	Silverstone Circuit, Silverstone; International Circuit	5 April	United Formula Ford Championship; Britcar Endurance Championship	2025 Monoposto Championship is located in England
3	Anglesey Circuit, Tŷ Croes; Coastal Circuit	10 May	United Formula Ford Championship; Porsche Club Championship; Production GTI Championship; Porsche Club 911 Challenge	2025 Monoposto Championship is located in England
4	Anglesey Circuit, Tŷ Croes; Coastal Circuit	11 May	United Formula Ford Championship; Porsche Club Championship; Production GTI Championship; Porsche Club 911 Challenge	2025 Monoposto Championship is located in England
5	Anglesey Circuit, Tŷ Croes; Coastal Circuit	11 May	United Formula Ford Championship; Porsche Club Championship; Production GTI Championship; Porsche Club 911 Challenge	2025 Monoposto Championship is located in England
6	Silverstone Circuit, Silverstone; Grand Prix Circuit	7 June	Equipe Classic Racing Weekend; Sports 2000 Duratec Championship	2025 Monoposto Championship is located in England
7	Silverstone Circuit, Silverstone; Grand Prix Circuit	8 June	Equipe Classic Racing Weekend; Sports 2000 Duratec Championship	2025 Monoposto Championship is located in England
8	Thruxton Circuit, Thruxton; Main Circuit	6 July	Mini Challenge Clubsport Championship; Britcar Endurance Championship; BMW Car Club Racing Championship; British Truck Racing Championship	2025 Monoposto Championship is located in England
9	Thruxton Circuit, Thruxton; Main Circuit	6 July	Mini Challenge Clubsport Championship; Britcar Endurance Championship; BMW Car Club Racing Championship; British Truck Racing Championship	2025 Monoposto Championship is located in England
10	Thruxton Circuit, Thruxton; Main Circuit	6 July	Mini Challenge Clubsport Championship; Britcar Endurance Championship; BMW Car Club Racing Championship; British Truck Racing Championship	2025 Monoposto Championship is located in England
11	Snetterton Circuit, Snetterton; 300 Circuit	9 August	Classic Touring Car Racing Club Weekend; Snetterton Saloons; Jem Marsh Memorial Race; MSVR All-Comers	2025 Monoposto Championship is located in England
12	Snetterton Circuit, Snetterton; 300 Circuit	10 August	Classic Touring Car Racing Club Weekend; Snetterton Saloons; Jem Marsh Memorial Race; MSVR All-Comers	2025 Monoposto Championship is located in England
13	Snetterton Circuit, Snetterton; 300 Circuit	10 August	Classic Touring Car Racing Club Weekend; Snetterton Saloons; Jem Marsh Memorial Race; MSVR All-Comers	2025 Monoposto Championship is located in England
14	Donington Park, Castle Donington; National Circuit	23 August	United Formula Ford Championship; Production GTI Championship	2025 Monoposto Championship is located in England
15	Donington Park, Castle Donington; National Circuit	23 August	United Formula Ford Championship; Production GTI Championship	2025 Monoposto Championship is located in England

== F3 Classes ==
=== Drivers and teams ===
The F3 A class was reserved for cars utilizing newer, F3-spec engines while the F3 B class remained open for all older F3 engines as well as F4 engines.

Team	No.	Driver	Car	Engine	Rounds
F3 A entries
Team Fox Racing	9	(United Kingdom) Tony Bishop	Dallara F311	VW Spiess	1–2, 6–7, 11–13
Team Fox Racing	54	(Republic of Ireland) Brendan O'Brien	Dallara F311	VW Spiess	14–15
Team Fox Racing	62	(United Kingdom) Anya Garner	Dallara F308	VW A18	All
Team Fox Racing	78	(United Kingdom) Tommy Callan	Dallara F306	Honda Mugen	14–15
Team Fox Racing	89	(United Kingdom) James Williams	Dallara F308	VW A18	All
Fern GP	16	(United Kingdom) Felix Baggott	Dallara F310	VW Spiess	1–13
Langford Line Motorsport	51	(United Kingdom) George Line	Dallara F308	VW Spiess	All
ARP Chartered Surveyors	79	(United Kingdom) Andrew Pryke	Dallara F305	Mercedes HWA	All
Racecar Warehouse	96	(United Kingdom) Kevan McLurg	Dallara F308	Mercedes HWA	1–10, 14–15
F3 B entries
privateer	6	(United Kingdom) Peter Venn	Ralt F302	BMW	6–10
privateer	15	(United Kingdom) Simon Tate	Dallara F302/4	Vauxhall	8–10
Magic Motorsport	10	(United Kingdom) Neil Harrison	Dallara F398	Vauxhall C20XE	1–7, 11–13
Fern GP	18	(United Kingdom) Nigel Howard	Dallara F301	Renault Sodemo	6–7
Fern GP	27	(United Kingdom) Kirsty Mansell	Dallara F399	Toyota 3SGE	1–7
Fern GP	38	(United Kingdom) Tom Roper	Dallara F302	Toyota TOM'S	8–10
Fern GP	77	(United Kingdom) Nigel Davers	Dallara F302	Toyota	6–10
GDB Motorsport	36	(United Kingdom) Mike Hatton	Dallara F305	Toyota 3SGE Piedrafita	1–2, 6–7, 14–15
Watson Wheatley	56	(United Kingdom) Tom Wheatley	Dallara F301	Toyota 3SGE	All
Team Molloy Racing	66	(United Kingdom) Jamie Molloy	Tatuus FR	Renault F4R	1–10, 14–15
Enigma Motorsport	68	(United Kingdom) Malcolm Scott	Dallara F305	Toyota Piedrafita	All
Revs Italia	75	(United Kingdom) Thomas Hill	Dallara F302	Vauxhall C20XE	1–7, 11–15
#57 Malaga/Fuchs/EBC	157	(United Kingdom) Chris Levy	Dallara F397	Vauxhall C20XE	1–2, 6–13

=== Race results ===
Round	Circuit	Pole position	F3 A		F3 B	
Round	Circuit	Pole position	Fastest lap	Winning driver	Fastest lap	Winning driver
1	Silverstone Circuit	(United Kingdom) George Line	(United Kingdom) George Line	(United Kingdom) George Line	(United Kingdom) Tom Wheatley	(United Kingdom) Tom Wheatley
2	Silverstone Circuit	(United Kingdom) George Line	(United Kingdom) George Line	(United Kingdom) George Line	(United Kingdom) Tom Wheatley	(United Kingdom) Tom Wheatley
3	Anglesey Circuit	(United Kingdom) George Line	(United Kingdom) George Line	(United Kingdom) George Line	(United Kingdom) Thomas Hill	(United Kingdom) Tom Wheatley
4	Anglesey Circuit	(United Kingdom) George Line	(United Kingdom) George Line	(United Kingdom) George Line	(United Kingdom) Thomas Hill	(United Kingdom) Thomas Hill
5	Anglesey Circuit	(United Kingdom) George Line	(United Kingdom) George Line	(United Kingdom) George Line	(United Kingdom) Thomas Hill	(United Kingdom) Neil Harrison
6	Silverstone Circuit	(United Kingdom) George Line	(United Kingdom) Tony Bishop	(United Kingdom) George Line	(United Kingdom) Tom Wheatley	(United Kingdom) Tom Wheatley
7	Silverstone Circuit	(United Kingdom) Tony Bishop	(United Kingdom) Tony Bishop	(United Kingdom) George Line	(United Kingdom) Tom Wheatley	(United Kingdom) Tom Wheatley
8	Thruxton Circuit	race declared void after incorrect starting procedure				
9	Thruxton Circuit	(United Kingdom) Tom Wheatley	(United Kingdom) George Line	(United Kingdom) George Line	(United Kingdom) Chris Levy	(United Kingdom) Chris Levy
10	Thruxton Circuit	(United Kingdom) George Line	(United Kingdom) George Line	(United Kingdom) George Line	(United Kingdom) Tom Roper	(United Kingdom) Tom Wheatley
11	Snetterton Circuit	(United Kingdom) Tony Bishop	(United Kingdom) George Line	(United Kingdom) George Line	(United Kingdom) Chris Levy	(United Kingdom) Chris Levy
12	Snetterton Circuit	(United Kingdom) George Line	(United Kingdom) George Line	(United Kingdom) George Line	(United Kingdom) Chris Levy	(United Kingdom) Chris Levy
13	Snetterton Circuit	(United Kingdom) George Line	(United Kingdom) George Line	(United Kingdom) George Line	(United Kingdom) Neil Harrison	(United Kingdom) Neil Harrison
14	Donington Park	(United Kingdom) George Line	(United Kingdom) George Line	(United Kingdom) George Line	(United Kingdom) Tom Wheatley	(United Kingdom) Tom Wheatley
15	Donington Park	(United Kingdom) George Line	(United Kingdom) James Williams	(United Kingdom) George Line	(United Kingdom) Tom Wheatley	(United Kingdom) Malcolm Scott

=== Championship standings ===
Points were awarded as follows:

Position	**1st**	**2nd**	**3rd**	**4th**	**5th**	**6th**	**7th**	**8th**	**9th**	**10th**	**11th**	**12th+**	**F.L.**
Points	15	12	10	9	8	7	6	5	4	3	2	1	1

Each driver's three worst results were dropped.

Pos	Driver	SIL1		ANG			SIL2		THR			SNE			DON		Pts
Pos	Driver	R1	R2	R3	R4	R5	R6	R7	R8	R9	R10	R11	R12	R13	R14	R15	Pts
F3 A standings
1	(United Kingdom) George Line	**1**	**1**	**1**	**1**	**1**	(**1**)	(1)	C	1	**1**	1	**1**	**1**	**1**	(**1**)	176
2	(United Kingdom) James Williams	(4)	(4)	2	2	(3)	3	3	C	2	2	3	3	3	2	2	123
3	(United Kingdom) Felix Baggott	(6)	5	4	4	2	4	4	C	3	3	5	4	4			102
4	(United Kingdom) Andrew Pryke	3	3	3	3	4	(Ret)	5	C	(Ret)	(DNS)	4	Ret	5	3	3	94
5	(United Kingdom) Tony Bishop	2	2				2	**2**				**2**	2	2			86
6	(United Kingdom) Anya Garner	(7)	(7)	5	5	6	6	(7)	C	5	5	6	5	6	5	4	85
7	(United Kingdom) Kevan McLurg	5	6	6	6	5	5	6	C	4	4				WD	WD	70
8	(Republic of Ireland) Brendan O'Brien														4	5	17
9	(United Kingdom) Tommy Callan														6	NC	7
F3 B standings
1	(United Kingdom) Tom Wheatley	1	1	1	2	(DNS)	1	1	**C**	(**Ret**)	1	3	4	(DNS)	1	Ret	142
2	(United Kingdom) Neil Harrison	2	5	3	3	1	2	3				2	3	1			115
3	(United Kingdom) Malcolm Scott	5	(Ret)	(Ret)	4	3	3	4	C	2	(Ret)	Ret	2	Ret	2	1	97
4	(United Kingdom) Chris Levy	6	4				6	2	C	1	DNS	1	1	Ret			83
5	(United Kingdom) Thomas Hill	4	2	2	1	2	WD	WD				WD	WD	WD	WD	WD	63
6	(United Kingdom) Jamie Molloy	7	Ret	4	5	4	DNS	Ret	C	4	2				3	DNS	63
7	(United Kingdom) Mike Hatton	3	3				4	5							DNS	WD	37
8	(United Kingdom) Kirsty Mansell	8	6	DSQ	DNS	5	DNS	Ret									20
9	(United Kingdom) Nigel Davers						5	Ret	C	5	DNS						16
10	(United Kingdom) Tom Roper								C	3	Ret						11
—	(United Kingdom) Simon Tate								C	Ret	DNS						0
—	(United Kingdom) Nigel Howard						Ret	DNS									0
—	(United Kingdom) Peter Venn						WD	WD									0
Pos	Driver	R1	R2	R3	R4	R5	R6	R7	R8	R9	R10	R11	R12	R13	R14	R15	Pts
Pos	Driver	SIL1		ANG			SIL2		THR			SNE			DON		Pts

Colour	Result
Gold	Winner
Silver	Second place
Bronze	Third place
Green	Points classification
Blue	Non-points classification
Blue	Non-classified finish (NC)
Purple	Retired, not classified (Ret)
Red	Did not qualify (DNQ)
Red	Did not pre-qualify (DNPQ)
Black	Disqualified (DSQ)
White	Did not start (DNS)
White	Withdrew (WD)
White	Race cancelled (C)
Blank	Did not practice (DNP)
Blank	Did not arrive (DNA)
Blank	Excluded (EX)

**Bold** – Pole

Italics – Fastest Lap

† — Did not finish, but classified

== Mono Classes ==
=== Drivers and teams ===
Team	No.	Driver	Car	Engine	Rounds
Mono 1600 entries
privateer	5	(United Kingdom) Russ Giles	Van Diemen VD77	Ford	3–5
privateer	42	(United Kingdom) Alexander Bagnall	Formula Vauxhall Junior	Vauxhall	1–2
privateer	92	(United Kingdom) Jack Squires	Swift SC97	Ford Kent	1–5, 11–13
Endless Motorsport	13	(United Kingdom) Kyle Wallace	Formula Renault	Renault F2N	All
Fern GP	22	(United Kingdom) Tom Dackins	Mygale Formula Ford 1600	Ford Kent	1–7, 11–13
Fern GP	27	(United Kingdom) Kirsty Mansell	Formula Ford	Ford	8–10
Oldfield Motorsport	48	(Germany) Maris Schulte	Van Diemen JL13	Ford Crossflow	1–5
Oldfield Motorsport	55	(United Kingdom) Spencer Shinner	Van Diemen JL13	Ford Crossflow	1–5
Oldfield Motorsport	97	(United Kingdom) Connor Willis	Van Diemen JL13	Ford Kent	3–5
Mono 1800 entries
Endless Motorsport	4	(United Kingdom) Joe Goodwin	Van Diemen RF95	Ford Zetec	1–5, 8–13
privateer	12	(United Kingdom) Phil Davis	Van Diemen RF98	Ford Zetec	3–15
privateer	47	(United Kingdom) David Jones	Van Diemen RF82	Ford Pinto	6–10, 14–15
privateer	61	(United Kingdom) Julian Hoskins	Vector TF93Z	Ford Zetec	All
privateer	69	(United Kingdom) Geoff Pashley	Reynard	Ford Pinto	11–13
Next Racing Generation	43	(United Kingdom) Isaiah Egwuagu	Van Diemen RF97	Ford Zetec	2, 7
Next Racing Generation	43	(United Kingdom) Emmanuel Bradley	Van Diemen RF97	Ford Zetec	1, 6
Next Racing Generation	113	(United Kingdom) Montoye Baker	Van Diemen RF97	Ford Zetec	6–7
Global Search Partners	49	(Israel) Amnon Needham	Van Diemen RF82	Ford Pinto	7, 11–13
RaceCarWings	189	(United Kingdom) Callan Trump	Van Diemen FX02	Ford Zetec	14–15
Mono 2000 entries
MGS Motorsport	14	(United Kingdom) Robert Smith	Dallara F395	Vauxhall	11–15
privateer	21	(United Kingdom) Ian Hughes	Dallara F393	Renault	1–2, 6–7
privateer	83	(United Kingdom) David Spencer	Reynard 883	Volkswagen	6–15
privateer	98	(United Kingdom) Rodney Toft	Toms Toyota 036F	Toyota 3SGE	6–10, 14–15
Mictel Hillpress	32	(United Kingdom) Terry Clark	Van Diemen RF00	Ford Zetec	All
Edginton Racing	41	(Switzerland) Damon Bland	Van Diemen RF01	Ford Zetec	All
Endless Motorsport	65	(United Kingdom) Paul Bailey	Van Diemen RF01	Ford Zetec	3–5
Magic Motorsport	93	(United Kingdom) Mark Harrison	Dallara F394	Opel Spiess	1–13
Fern GP	99	(United Kingdom) Mat Jordan	Van Diemen RF99	Ford Zetec	1–7, 11–13
Mono 2000 Classic entries
Endless Motorsport	14	(United Kingdom) Phil Chappell	Formula Vauxhall Lotus	Vauxhall C20XE	1–5, 8–15
privateer	25	(United Kingdom) Jim Spencer	Reynard 883	Volkswagen	All
privateer	26	(United Kingdom) Richard Biles	Formula Vauxhall Lotus	Vauxhall C20XE	All
privateer	43	(United Kingdom) Emmanuel Bradley	Van Diemen Formula Forward		6
privateer	57	(United Kingdom) Edward Guest	Anson SA4	Vauxhall C20XE	1–2, 11–13
privateer	83	(United Kingdom) David Spencer	Reynard 883	Volkswagen	1–5
Will Cox Racing	44	(United Kingdom) Will Cox	Ralt RT3	Vauxhall C20XE	All

=== Race results ===
Round	Circuit	Mono 1600		Mono 1800		Mono 2000		Mono 2000 Classic	
Round	Circuit	Fastest lap	Winning driver	Fastest lap	Winning driver	Fastest lap	Winning driver	Fastest lap	Winning driver
1	Silverstone Circuit	(United Kingdom) Tom Dackins	(United Kingdom) Tom Dackins	(United Kingdom) Julian Hoskins	(United Kingdom) Julian Hoskins	(United Kingdom) Mark Harrison	(United Kingdom) Mark Harrison	(United Kingdom) Richard Biles	(United Kingdom) Richard Biles
2	Silverstone Circuit	(United Kingdom) Alexander Bagnall	(United Kingdom) Tom Dackins	(United Kingdom) Julian Hoskins	(United Kingdom) Julian Hoskins	(United Kingdom) Terry Clark	(United Kingdom) Terry Clark	(United Kingdom) Will Cox	(United Kingdom) Will Cox
3	Anglesey Circuit	(United Kingdom) Spencer Shinner	(United Kingdom) Spencer Shinner	(United Kingdom) Julian Hoskins	(United Kingdom) Julian Hoskins	(United Kingdom) Mark Harrison	(United Kingdom) Mark Harrison	(United Kingdom) Will Cox	(United Kingdom) Will Cox
4	Anglesey Circuit	(United Kingdom) Kyle Wallace	(United Kingdom) Kyle Wallace	(United Kingdom) Julian Hoskins	(United Kingdom) Julian Hoskins	(United Kingdom) Mark Harrison	(United Kingdom) Mark Harrison	(United Kingdom) Will Cox	(United Kingdom) Will Cox
5	Anglesey Circuit	(United Kingdom) Kyle Wallace	(United Kingdom) Kyle Wallace	(United Kingdom) Julian Hoskins	(United Kingdom) Julian Hoskins	(United Kingdom) Mark Harrison	(United Kingdom) Mark Harrison	(United Kingdom) Will Cox	(United Kingdom) Will Cox
6	Silverstone Circuit	(United Kingdom) Kyle Wallace	(United Kingdom) Kyle Wallace	(United Kingdom) Phil Davis	(United Kingdom) Phil Davis	(United Kingdom) Mark Harrison	(United Kingdom) Mark Harrison	(United Kingdom) Will Cox	(United Kingdom) Will Cox
7	Silverstone Circuit	(United Kingdom) Kyle Wallace	(United Kingdom) Kyle Wallace	(United Kingdom) Phil Davis	(United Kingdom) Phil Davis	(United Kingdom) Mark Harrison	(United Kingdom) Mark Harrison	(United Kingdom) Will Cox	(United Kingdom) Will Cox
8	Thruxton Circuit	race declared void after incorrect starting procedure							
9	Thruxton Circuit	(United Kingdom) Kyle Wallace	(United Kingdom) Kyle Wallace	(United Kingdom) Julian Hoskins	(United Kingdom) Julian Hoskins	(United Kingdom) Mark Harrison	(United Kingdom) Mark Harrison	(United Kingdom) Will Cox	(United Kingdom) Will Cox
10	Thruxton Circuit	(United Kingdom) Kyle Wallace	(United Kingdom) Kyle Wallace	(United Kingdom) Julian Hoskins	(United Kingdom) Julian Hoskins	(United Kingdom) Mark Harrison	(United Kingdom) Mark Harrison	(United Kingdom) Will Cox	(United Kingdom) Will Cox
11	Snetterton Circuit	(United Kingdom) Kyle Wallace	(United Kingdom) Kyle Wallace	(United Kingdom) Julian Hoskins	(United Kingdom) Julian Hoskins	(United Kingdom) Robert Smith	(United Kingdom) Terry Clark	(United Kingdom) Will Cox	(United Kingdom) Will Cox
12	Snetterton Circuit	(United Kingdom) Kyle Wallace	(United Kingdom) Kyle Wallace	(United Kingdom) Julian Hoskins	(United Kingdom) Julian Hoskins	(United Kingdom) Mark Harrison	(United Kingdom) Terry Clark	(United Kingdom) Will Cox	(United Kingdom) Will Cox
13	Snetterton Circuit	no starters		(United Kingdom) Julian Hoskins	(United Kingdom) Julian Hoskins	(United Kingdom) Mark Harrison	(United Kingdom) Mark Harrison	(United Kingdom) Will Cox	(United Kingdom) Will Cox
14	Donington Park	(United Kingdom) Kyle Wallace	(United Kingdom) Kyle Wallace	(United Kingdom) Julian Hoskins	(United Kingdom) Julian Hoskins	(United Kingdom) Robert Smith	(United Kingdom) Robert Smith	(United Kingdom) Will Cox	(United Kingdom) Will Cox
15	Donington Park	(United Kingdom) Kyle Wallace	(United Kingdom) Kyle Wallace	(United Kingdom) Julian Hoskins	(United Kingdom) Julian Hoskins	(United Kingdom) Terry Clark	(United Kingdom) Terry Clark	(United Kingdom) Will Cox	(United Kingdom) Will Cox

=== Championship standings ===
Points were awarded as follows:

Position	**1st**	**2nd**	**3rd**	**4th**	**5th**	**6th**	**7th**	**8th**	**9th**	**10th**	**11th**	**12th+**	**F.L.**
Points	15	12	10	9	8	7	6	5	4	3	2	1	1

Each driver's three worst results were dropped.

Pos	Driver	SIL1		ANG			SIL2		THR			SNE			DON		Pts
Pos	Driver	R1	R2	R3	R4	R5	R6	R7	R8	R9	R10	R11	R12	R13	R14	R15	Pts
Mono 1600 standings
1	(United Kingdom) Kyle Wallace	2	(Ret)	(3)	1	1	1	1	C	1	1	1	1	(DNS)	1	1	172
2	(United Kingdom) Tom Dackins	1	1	Ret	2	2	2	2				2	Ret	DNS			91
3	(United Kingdom) Jack Squires	3	2	4	Ret	3						Ret	Ret	DNS			41
4	(United Kingdom) Kirsty Mansell								C	2	2						24
5	(United Kingdom) Spencer Shinner	Ret	Ret	1	WD	WD											16
6	(Germany) Maris Schulte	Ret	Ret	2	Ret	WD											12
7	(United Kingdom) Alexander Bagnall	Ret	3														11
—	(United Kingdom) Connor Willis			Ret	Ret	WD											0
—	(United Kingdom) Russ Giles			Ret	WD	WD											0
Mono 1800 standings
1	(United Kingdom) Julian Hoskins	(1)	1	1	1	1	(WD)	(WD)	C	1	1	1	1	1	1	1	176
2	(United Kingdom) Phil Davis			(2)	2	2	1	1	C	2	2	2	2	2	2	2	140
3	(United Kingdom) Joe Goodwin	2	2	3	3	3			C	3	3	4	Ret	Ret			83
4	(United Kingdom) David Jones						2	3	C	4	4				3	3	60
5	(Israel) Amnon Needham							2				3	3	3			42
6	(United Kingdom) Emmanuel Bradley	3					WD										10
7	(United Kingdom) Geoff Pashley											5	Ret	Ret			8
—	(United Kingdom) Isaiah Egwuagu		Ret					WD									0
—	(United Kingdom) Callan Trump														Ret	Ret	0
—	(United Kingdom) Montoye Baker						WD	WD									0
Mono 2000 standings
1	(United Kingdom) Mark Harrison	1	(Ret)	1	1	1	1	1	C	1	1	Ret	2	1			157
2	(United Kingdom) Terry Clark	4	1	2	2	2	(Ret)	2	C	(Ret)	(Ret)	1	1	3	2	1	141
3	(Switzerland) Damon Bland	3	3	(4)	(4)	(4)	3	4	C	2	2	3	4	4	4	4	109
4	(United Kingdom) Mat Jordan	2	2	3	3	3	2	Ret				Ret	WD	WD			66
5	(United Kingdom) Robert Smith											2	3	2	1	2	63
6	(United Kingdom) David Spencer						4	3	C	Ret	3	Ret	Ret	Ret	3	3	49
7	(United Kingdom) Rodney Toft						5	Ret	C	3	Ret				Ret	5	26
8	(United Kingdom) Paul Bailey			5	5	5											25
—	(United Kingdom) Ian Hughes	Ret	Ret				WD	WD									0
Mono 2000 Classic standings
1	(United Kingdom) Will Cox	(2)	(1)	(1)	1	1	1	1	C	1	1	1	1	1	1	1	176
2	(United Kingdom) Richard Biles	1	(4)	(3)	(2)	2	2	2	C	2	2	2	2	2	2	2	136
3	(United Kingdom) Jim Spencer	3	2	(4)	(Ret)	(Ret)	3	3	C	3	3	3	3	3	3	3	112
4	(United Kingdom) Phil Chappell	Ret	3	2	4	4			C	Ret	4	(WD)	WD	WD	WD	WD	49
5	(United Kingdom) David Spencer	4	5	Ret	3	3											37
6	(United Kingdom) Edward Guest	Ret	Ret									4	4	4			27
—	(United Kingdom) Emmanuel Bradley						Ret										0
—	(United Kingdom) Chris Okocha							WD									0
Pos	Driver	R1	R2	R3	R4	R5	R6	R7	R8	R9	R10	R11	R12	R13	R14	R15	Pts
Pos	Driver	SIL1		ANG			SIL2		THR			SNE			DON		Pts

Colour	Result
Gold	Winner
Silver	Second place
Bronze	Third place
Green	Points classification
Blue	Non-points classification
Blue	Non-classified finish (NC)
Purple	Retired, not classified (Ret)
Red	Did not qualify (DNQ)
Red	Did not pre-qualify (DNPQ)
Black	Disqualified (DSQ)
White	Did not start (DNS)
White	Withdrew (WD)
White	Race cancelled (C)
Blank	Did not practice (DNP)
Blank	Did not arrive (DNA)
Blank	Excluded (EX)

**Bold** – Pole

Italics – Fastest Lap

† — Did not finish, but classified

== Moto Classes ==
=== Drivers and teams ===
Team	No.	Driver	Car	Engine	Rounds
Moto 1000 entries
privateer	20	(United Kingdom) Anthony Gauntlett	Jedi	Suzuki GSXR	6–15
privateer	30	(United Kingdom) Andrew Cartmell	Revelation 1000	Honda Fireblade	1–7, 14–15
privateer	53	(United Kingdom) Dan Clowes	Jedi Mk 6	Suzuki GSXR	1–2
privateer	70	(United Kingdom) Paul Hutson	Jedi Mk 6	Yamaha R1	1–10, 14–15
Mittell Cars	23	(United Kingdom) David Shephard	Jedi Mk 6	Suzuki	6–7
Mittell Cars	71	(United Kingdom) Stuart Miller	Jedi Mk 6/7	Suzuki GSXR	6–7
Mittell Cars	80	(United Kingdom) Dan Gore	Jedi Mk 6/7	Suzuki GSXR	6–7
Perpetuum Motorsport	24	(United Kingdom) Matthew Haughton	Jedi Mk 7	Suzuki GSXR	All
Jedi Racing Cars	28	(United Kingdom) Kayleigh Cole	Jedi	Suzuki GSXR	1–2
PR3 Racing	29	(United Kingdom) Jamie Tanser	PR3	Yamaha	All
Wuffes	45	(United Kingdom) Bert Chapman	Jedi	Suzuki GSXR	6–7
Team Fern Racing	77	(United Kingdom) Nigel Davers	Jedi Mk 6	BMW S1000RR	1–7, 11–15
Manic Motorsport	88	(United Kingdom) Gary Cobourn	Jedi Mk 4	Honda	6–7, 11–13
Team Sellars Racing	91	(United Kingdom) Ryan Thomas	Jedi Mk 6	Suzuki GSXR	1–2
Jedi Racing	95	(United Kingdom) David Tagg	Jedi	Suzuki	1–2, 6–7
Jedi Racing	777	(United Kingdom) James Hills	Jedi Mk 6	Suzuki GSXR	1–2, 6–7
Moto 1400 entries
James Timms Transport	3	(United Kingdom) Jason Timms	Dallara F301	Suzuki Hayabusa	6–7, 14–15
SMS Engineering Services	8	(United Kingdom) Martin Wright	Dallara F301	Suzuki Hayabusa	3–5, 8–10
Perpetuum Motorsport	67	(United Kingdom) Andrew Wheals	Dallara 305/7	Suzuki	1–2, 6–15

=== Race results ===
Round	Circuit	Moto 1000		Moto 1400	
Round	Circuit	Fastest lap	Winning driver	Fastest lap	Winning driver
1	Silverstone Circuit	(United Kingdom) Matthew Haughton	(United Kingdom) Matthew Haughton	(United Kingdom) Andrew Wheals	(United Kingdom) Andrew Wheals
2	Silverstone Circuit	(United Kingdom) Matthew Haughton	(United Kingdom) Dan Clowes	(United Kingdom) Andrew Wheals	(United Kingdom) Andrew Wheals
3	Anglesey Circuit	(United Kingdom) Matthew Haughton	(United Kingdom) Matthew Haughton	(United Kingdom) Martin Wright	(United Kingdom) Martin Wright
4	Anglesey Circuit	(United Kingdom) Nigel Davers	(United Kingdom) Matthew Haughton	(United Kingdom) Martin Wright	(United Kingdom) Martin Wright
5	Anglesey Circuit	(United Kingdom) Matthew Haughton	(United Kingdom) Matthew Haughton	(United Kingdom) Martin Wright	(United Kingdom) Martin Wright
6	Silverstone Circuit	(United Kingdom) Bert Chapman	(United Kingdom) Bert Chapman	(United Kingdom) Andrew Wheals	(United Kingdom) Andrew Wheals
7	Silverstone Circuit	(United Kingdom) Bert Chapman	(United Kingdom) Bert Chapman	(United Kingdom) Andrew Wheals	(United Kingdom) Andrew Wheals
8	Thruxton Circuit	race declared void after incorrect starting procedure			
9	Thruxton Circuit	(United Kingdom) Matthew Haughton	(United Kingdom) Matthew Haughton	(United Kingdom) Martin Wright	(United Kingdom) Martin Wright
10	Thruxton Circuit	(United Kingdom) Matthew Haughton	(United Kingdom) Matthew Haughton	(United Kingdom) Martin Wright	(United Kingdom) Martin Wright
11	Snetterton Circuit	(United Kingdom) Matthew Haughton	(United Kingdom) Matthew Haughton	(United Kingdom) Andrew Wheals	(United Kingdom) Andrew Wheals
12	Snetterton Circuit	(United Kingdom) Matthew Haughton	(United Kingdom) Matthew Haughton	(United Kingdom) Andrew Wheals	(United Kingdom) Andrew Wheals
13	Snetterton Circuit	(United Kingdom) Matthew Haughton	(United Kingdom) Matthew Haughton	no starters	
14	Donington Park	(United Kingdom) Matthew Haughton	(United Kingdom) Matthew Haughton	(United Kingdom) Jason Timms	(United Kingdom) Jason Timms
15	Donington Park	(United Kingdom) Matthew Haughton	(United Kingdom) Matthew Haughton	(United Kingdom) Jason Timms	(United Kingdom) Jason Timms

=== Championship standings ===
Points were awarded as follows:

Position	**1st**	**2nd**	**3rd**	**4th**	**5th**	**6th**	**7th**	**8th**	**9th**	**10th**	**11th**	**12th+**	**F.L.**
Points	15	12	10	9	8	7	6	5	4	3	2	1	1

Each driver's three worst results were dropped.

Pos	Driver	SIL1		ANG			SIL2		THR			SNE			DON		Pts
Pos	Driver	R1	R2	R3	R4	R5	R6	R7	R8	R9	R10	R11	R12	R13	R14	R15	Pts
Moto 1000 standings
1	(United Kingdom) Matthew Haughton	1	(2)	1	1	1	Ret	(2)	C	1	1	1	1	1	1	1	175
2	(United Kingdom) Jamie Tanser	6	6	3	Ret	Ret	4	4	C	Ret	WD	2	2	2	3	3	98
3	(United Kingdom) Paul Hutson	4	4	4	3	2	DNS	Ret	C	WD	WD				4	4	67
4	(United Kingdom) Nigel Davers	3	DNS	2	2	Ret	WD	WD				Ret	Ret	WD	2	2	59
5	(United Kingdom) David Tagg	5	5				3	3									36
6	(United Kingdom) Bert Chapman						1	1									32
7	(United Kingdom) Dan Clowes	2	1														27
8	(United Kingdom) Stuart Miller						5	5									16
9	(United Kingdom) David Shephard						6	6									14
10	(United Kingdom) Dan Gore						2	Ret									12
11	(United Kingdom) Anthony Gauntlett						WD	WD	C	2	Ret	WD	WD	WD	WD	WD	12
12	(United Kingdom) James Hills	Ret	3				WD	WD									10
13	(United Kingdom) Kayleigh Cole	DNS	7														6
—	(United Kingdom) Andrew Cartmell	WD	WD	WD	WD	WD	WD	WD							DNS	DNS	0
—	(United Kingdom) Gary Cobourn						WD	WD				WD	WD	WD			0
—	(United Kingdom) Ryan Thomas	WD	WD														0
Moto 1400 standings
1	(United Kingdom) Andrew Wheals	1	1				1	1	C	Ret	2	1	1	DNS	Ret	DNS	108
2	(United Kingdom) Martin Wright			1	1	1			C	1	1						80
3	(United Kingdom) Jason Timms						WD	WD							1	1	32
Pos	Driver	R1	R2	R3	R4	R5	R6	R7	R8	R9	R10	R11	R12	R13	R14	R15	Pts
Pos	Driver	SIL1		ANG			SIL2		THR			SNE			DON		Pts

Colour	Result
Gold	Winner
Silver	Second place
Bronze	Third place
Green	Points classification
Blue	Non-points classification
Blue	Non-classified finish (NC)
Purple	Retired, not classified (Ret)
Red	Did not qualify (DNQ)
Red	Did not pre-qualify (DNPQ)
Black	Disqualified (DSQ)
White	Did not start (DNS)
White	Withdrew (WD)
White	Race cancelled (C)
Blank	Did not practice (DNP)
Blank	Did not arrive (DNA)
Blank	Excluded (EX)

**Bold** – Pole

Italics – Fastest Lap

† — Did not finish, but classified
