= Chevron B38 =

The Chevron B38 was an open-wheel formula racing car, designed, developed and built by Chevron Cars, for both Formula Atlantic and Formula 3 racing, in 1977. It was powered by the Toyota/Novamotor PFT 2T-G 2.0 L (120 cu in) inline-four engine; which was good for 170 PS (125 kW; 168 bhp). This drove the rear wheels through a Hewland five-speed manual transmission. The chassis was constructed out of a lightweight aluminum monocoque. This gave the car an overall weight of 992 lb (450 kg).
