= Monoposto Racing Club =

Motor racing club

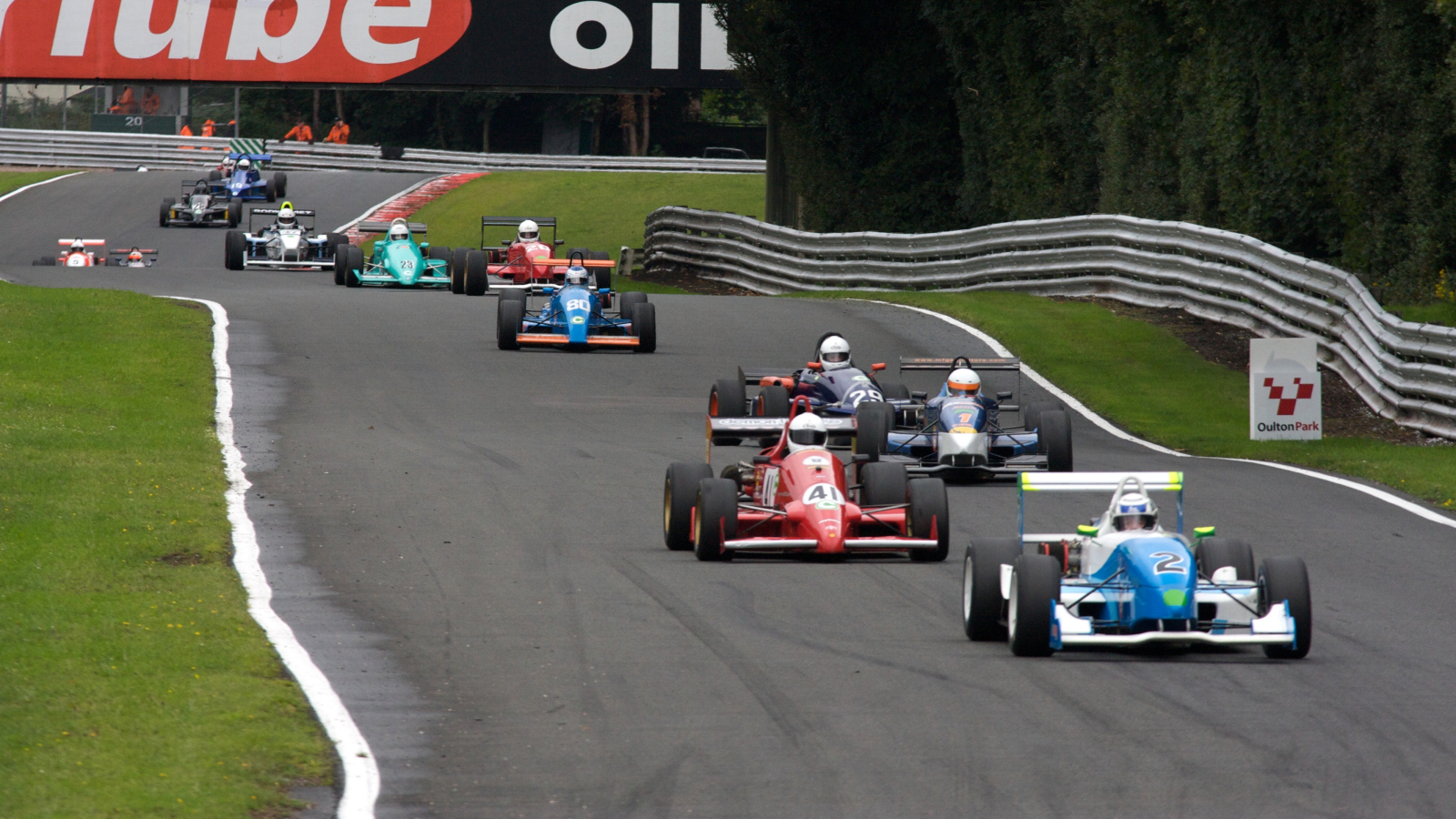
A typical Mono2000 grid in Monoposto, 2008

The Monoposto Racing Club (MRC) (Note: The club's name is derived from Monoposto, which is Italian for 'single seater'.) is a single seater, open-wheeled motor racing club in the United Kingdom. Its members race a variety of single seater race cars ranging from 1000cc "Mono Moto" cars to 2000cc Formula Three and Formula Renault cars.

== History ==
Monoposto Racing Club has been in operation since 1958.

As of 2010, it is the largest single seater championship in the UK, with over 60 regular race entrants.

The aim of the club is to organize single seater racing for the club racer.

== Monoposto Championship ==
The Monoposto Championship is organized by MRC. It visits most major UK race tracks, including Silverstone GP, Brands Hatch GP, Snetterton Circuit, Donington Park GP, Oulton Park, Castle Combe, Pembrey and Rockingham.

It used to have an annual non-championship event at Spa-Francorchamps but rising costs lead to this being cancelled. The club also runs the autumn Tiedeman Trophy Championship, named after the club's founder Frank Tiedeman, who died in 2013. Occasional non-championship rounds are also run.

Points are scored for all finishers in their class order, with 15 for winner down to 1 for 12th and below. There is also a point for fastest lap in each class. Invited drivers are not eligible for points. The championship is decided from the best 10–12 scores from around 12 to 14 rounds. Events are generally run over 2 days with 4 track sessions per grid. This may be a separate qualification and race each day or a single qualification session and 3 race sessions.

=== Regulations ===
Production chassis must be at least four years old, except for homemade chassis.

It has several classes of cars, starting with "Mono": Moto 1000, Moto 1400, 1600, 1800, 2000 Classic, 2000, F3 A and F3 B; these are based primarily on the maximum permitted engine size, but also engine tuning freedom, chassis age and chassis materials. Most race meetings have the classes spread over two grids, with the 1000 and 1400 cars on one, and the 2000 classes on another. The 1600 and 1800 classes are alternated between the two, either together or independently, depending on the circuit and expected entry numbers.

=== Class structure ===
According to Monoposto Racing Club's website, as of 2025, the class structure of Monoposto Championship is as follows:

- Mono F3 A: For 2005–2011 Formula Three cars with F3 engines and 2006–2008 Formula Renault cars without restrictor.
- Mono F3 B: For 1997–2011 F3 cars using traditional Mono spec road-derived and Piedrafieta-tuned Toyota engines, 1997–2004 F3 cars with F3 engines, 2006–2007 Formula Renault cars with a 40 mm (1.6 in) restrictor, and chassis complied to first generation Formula 4 regulations, including Tatuus and Mygale first generation F4 cars.
- Mono 2000: For 750 Motor Club Formula 4, United States Formula Ford 2000 and up to 1996 Formula Three cars; spaceframe or aluminium monocoque chassis manufactured in 2001 or later; up to 1999 Formula Renault and pre-1996 carbon-tubbed Formula 3 cars.
- Mono 2000 Classic: For pre-1993 aluminium alloy and/or steel construction chassis, as well as pre-1992 carbon fibre composite or aluminium alloy chassis complying to F3 regulations.
- Mono 1800: For Formula Ford cars using Duratec or Zetec engines. Classic Formula Ford 2000, Formula Vauxhall Junior (16V) and Formula Ireland cars are allowed in this class as well.
- Mono 1600: For Formula Ford, FF2000, Formula Vauxhall Junior (8V) and Formula Renault 1700 cars.
- Mono Moto 1400: For bike-engined cars with engine capacity from 1001 to 1400cc, as well as carbon-tubbed Mono Moto 1000 chassis.
- Mono Moto 1000: For motorcycle-derived-engined cars with an engine displacement of up to 1000cc.

=== List of past Monoposto Championship winners ===
==== 1958–1999 ====
Season	A	B	Mono Kent
1958	Not held		
1959	Frank Tiedeman	Not held	
1960	Tony Goodwin	Not held	
1961	Alan Wershat	Not held	
1962	John Moore	Not held	
1963	Terry Ogilvie Hardy	Not held	
1964	Bill Cooper	Not held	
1965	Roy Lee	Dave Havelock	Not held
1966	Jon Derisley	Gordon Rae	Not held
1967	John Green	Brian Jordan	Not held
1968	Jim Yardley	Eddie Heasell	Not held
1969	Jim Yardley	Alan Joy	Not held
1970	Brian Toft	Alan Joy	Not held
1971	Chris Featherstone	Brian Jordan	Not held
1972	Trevor Scarratt	Mike Irons	Not held
1973	Brian Jordan	Graham Bowskill	Not held
1974	Alan Baillie	Not held	Not held
1975	Alan Baillie	Not held	Not held
1976	Alan Baillie	Not held	Not held
1977	Carl Jeanes	Not held	Not held
1978	Ray Thomas	Not held	Not held
1979	Julian Pratt	Not held	Not held
1980	Alex Lowe	Not held	Not held
1981	Tony Broster	Not held	Francis Phillips
1982	Kenny Stone	Not held	Francis Phillips
1983	Godfrey Hall	Not held	David Cox
1984	George Whitehead	Not held	Simon Davey
1985	Brian Turner	Not held	Steve Bradley
1986	Brian Turner	Not held	Bernard Toleman
1987	John Bradshaw	Not held	Robert Goodwin
1988	George Whitehead	Not held	Chris Fox
1989	Jim Blockley	Not held	Kevin Pope
1990	Jim Blockley	Not held	Kevin Pope
1991	Francis Phillips	Not held	Roger Algar
1992	Jim Blockley	Not held	Dave McVerry
1993	Francis Phillips	Not held	Jim Timms
1994	Colin Stone	Not held	Keith Pashley
1996	Colin Stone	Not held	Peter Cocks
1996	Amanda Whitaker	Not held	Peter Cocks
1997	Amanda Whitaker	Not held	Jim Timms
1998	Amanda Whitaker	Paul Shipp	Jonathan Newman
1999	Robin Dawe	Paul Shipp	Simon Davey

==== 2000–2015 ====
Season	Mono 2000	Classic 2000	Mono 1800	Mono 1600	Mono 1400	MotoMono	Tiedeman Trophy
2000	Robin Dawe	Not held	Rob Manger	Simon Davey	Peter Dittmann	Not held	Not held
2001	Robin Dawe	Not held	Mark Drew	Jason Timms	Frazer Corbyn	Bob Couchman	Not held
2002	Jim Blockley	Not held	Phil House	Geoff Jones	Frazer Corbyn	Jonathan Green	Not held
2003	Jonathan Lewis	Not held	Geoff Pashley	John Johnsen	Rob Horsfield	Chris Robinson	Not held
2004	Jonathan Lewis	Not held	Jeremy Unsworth	Jeremy Timms	Richard Cottrill	John Carding	Not held
2005	Mark Harrison	Not held	Geoff Fern	Geoff Fern	John Carding	Arty Cameron	Not held
2006	Mark Harrison	Not held	Peter Bragg	Geoff Fern	Chris Woodhouse	Ake Bornebusch	Not held
2007	Mark Harrison	Russ Giles (Cup)	Peter Bragg	Geoff Fern	David Tilson	Steve Cave	Not held
2008	Jeremy Timms	Tristan Cliffe	Peter Bragg	Ewen Sergison	Steve Cave	Chris Vinall	Not held
2009	Neil Harrison; Graham Read (2000 Formula)	Russ Giles	Peter Bragg	David Parkinson	Chris Woodhouse	Stephen Brooks	Not held
2010	Tristan Cliffe	Jeremy Goodman	Peter Bragg	Nigel Davers	Geoff Fern	Arty Cameron	Not held
2011	Tristan Cliffe	Peter Venn	Peter Bragg	Nigel Davers	Geoff Fern	Adrian Wright	Not held
2012	Malcolm Scott	Jim Blockley	Ewen Sergison	Nigel Davers	Merged to MotoMono	Adrian Wright	Not held
2013	Robbie Watts	Ben Cater	Paul Britten; Marcus Sheard (Mono ZTEC)	Adrian Heath	Merged to MotoMono	Jason Timms	Jim Blockley
2014	Robbie Watts	Daniel Hands	Paul Britten; Doug McLay (Mono DTEC)	Andrew Gordon-Colebrook	Merged to MotoMono	Jason Timms	Geoff Fern
2015	Robbie Watts	Bryn Tootell	Matthew Walters; Doug McLay (Mono DTEC)	Geoff Fern	Merged to MotoMono	Jeremy Timms	Ewen Sergison

==== 2016–2023 ====
Season	Mono F3	Mono 2000	Classic 2000	Mono 1800	Mono 1600	Mono Moto 1400	Mono Moto 1000	Tiedeman Trophy
2016	Ben Cater	Kevin Otway	Robin Dawe	David Jones	Geoff Fern	Jeremy Timms	Richard Gittings	Geoff Fern
2017	Chris Hodgen (F3); James Densley (FR2000)	Bryn Tootell	Ian Hughes	Matthew Walters	Geoff Fern	Jeremy Timms	Mark Reade	Neil Harrison
2018	Ben Cater (F3); James Densley (FR2000)	Bryn Tootell	Peter Venn	Chris Lord	Geoff Fern	Geoff Fern	Dean Warren	Will Cox
2019	Ashley Dibden	Terry Clark	James Rimmer	Phil Davis	Geoff Fern	Jason Timms	Dominic Shepherd	Roger Wright
2020	Tony Bishop	Mat Jordan	Eddie Guest	Phil Davis	Will Cox	Martin Wright	Dan Clowes	Geoff Fern
2021	Lee Fern	Bryn Tootell	Jared Wood	Ben Stiles	Geoff Fern	Jason Timms	Dan Gore	Ben Powney
2022	Tony Bishop	James Rimmer	Jim Spencer	Phil Davis	Geoff Fern	Jason Timms	Mark Betts	Phil Davis
2023	Karl O'Brien	Tom Wheatley	Will Cox	Phil Davis	Geoff Fern	Jason Timms	Matty Haughton	Will Cox

==== 2024–2026 ====
Season	Mono F3 A	Mono F3 B	Mono 2000	Classic 2000	Mono 1800	Mono 1600	Mono Moto 1400	Mono Moto 1000	Tiedeman Trophy
2024	George Line	Ashley Dibden	Tom Wheatley	Will Cox	Sam Donn	Alex Bagnall	Jason Timms	Matty Haughton	Will Cox
2025	George Line	Tom Wheatley	Mark Harrison	Will Cox	Julian Hoskins	Kyle Wallace	Andrew Wheals	Matty Haughton	Kyle Wallace
2026	George Line	Mark Harrison	Damon Bland	Richard Biles	Sam Donn	Kyle Wallace	Martin Wright	Matty Haughton	Simon Tate
