= Formula Three =

Race car class

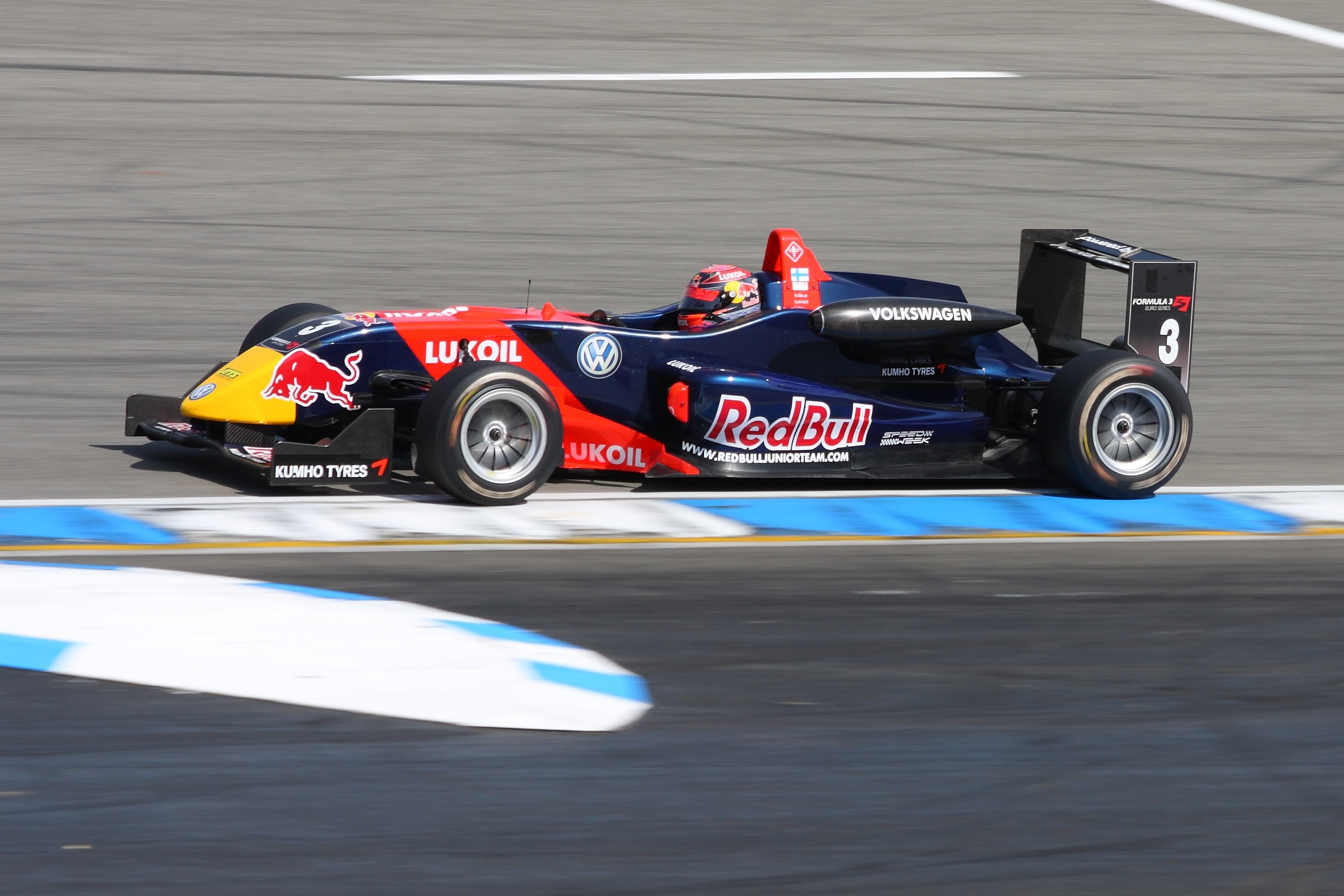
Mika Mäki drives a Dallara F308 Formula Three Car in a Formula 3 Euro Series race at Hockenheimring in 2009

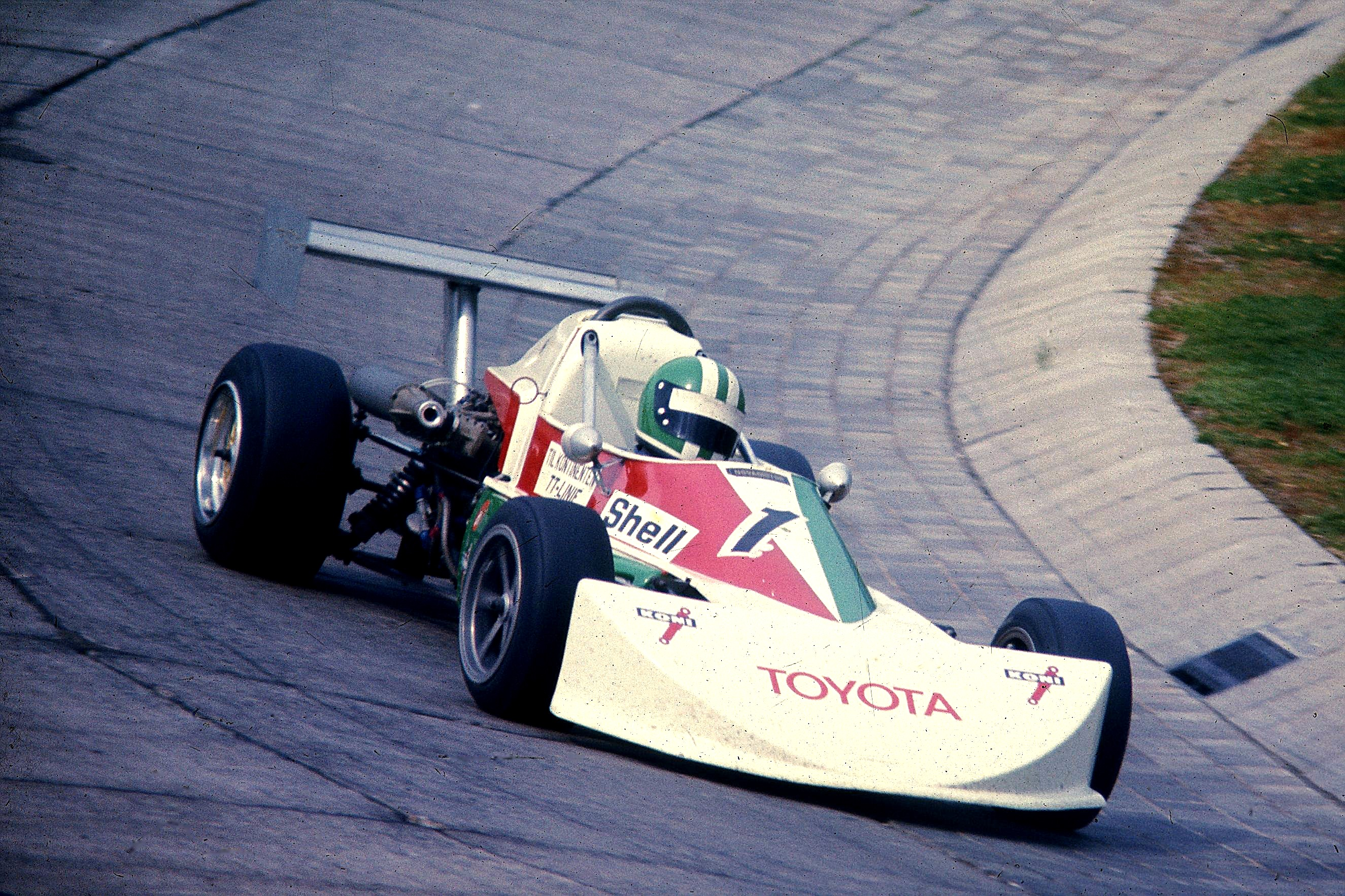
Rudolf Dötsch in a March–Toyota at the Nürburgring 1976

Formula Three (F3) is a third-tier class of open-wheel formula racing. The various championships held in Europe, Australia, South America and Asia form an important step for many prospective Formula One drivers.

== History ==
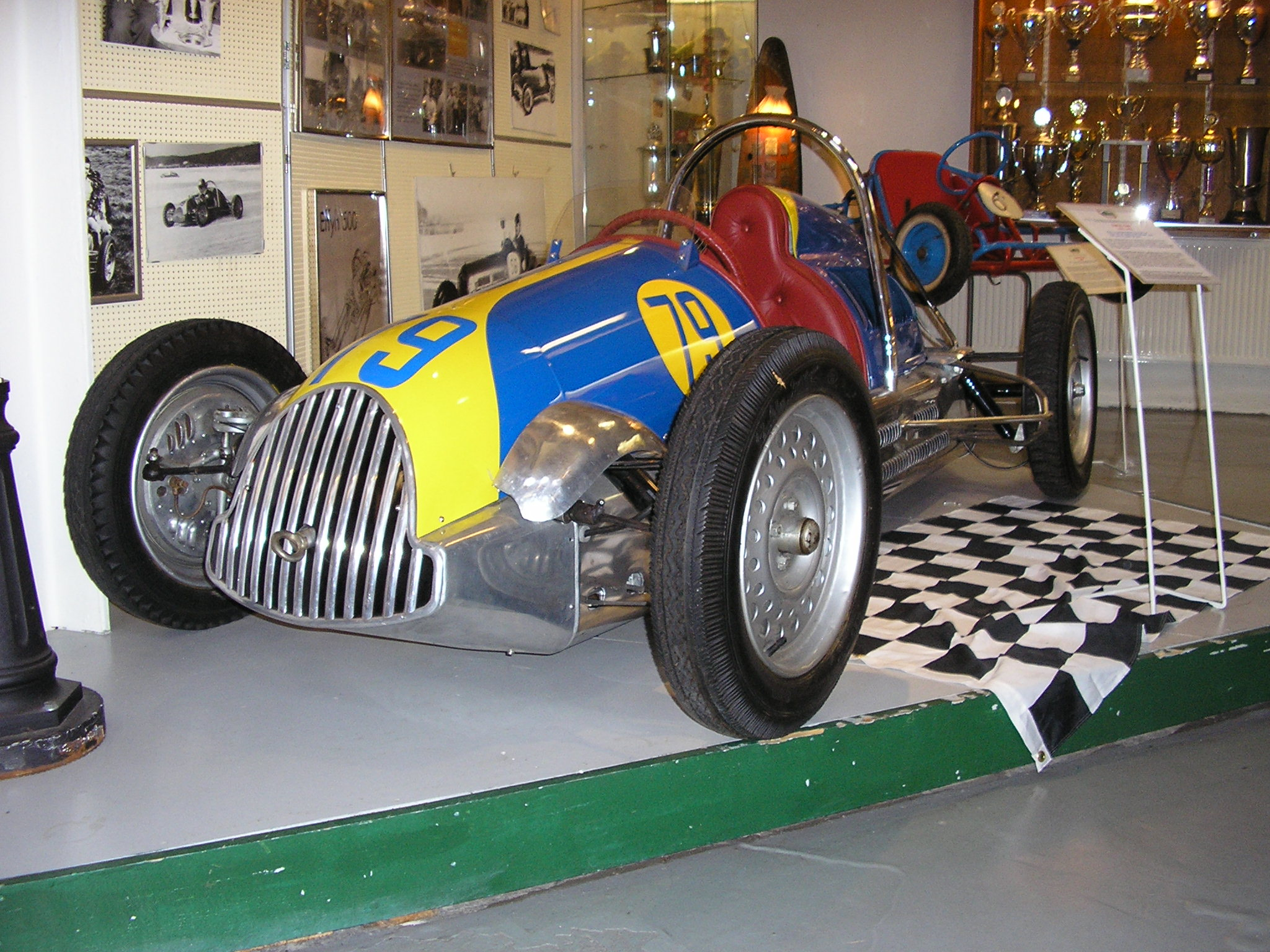
A typical early car, the Effyh 500 (1947–1952) was built in Malmö, Sweden and was one of the more successful cars. It had a lightweight tube chassis, aluminium bodywork and was powered by a 500cc 1-cylinder JAP engine.

Formula Three (adopted by the FIA in 1950) evolved from postwar auto racing, with lightweight tube-frame chassis powered by 500 cc motorcycle engines (notably Nortons and JAP speedway). The 500 cc formula originally evolved in 1946 from low-cost "special" racing organised by enthusiasts in Bristol, England, just before the Second World War; British motorsport after the war picked up slowly, partly due to petrol rationing which continued for a number of years and home-built 500 cc cars engines were intended to be accessible to the "impecunious enthusiast". The second post-war motor race in Britain was organised by the VSCC in July 1947 at RAF Gransden Lodge, 500cc cars being the only post-war class to run that day. Three of the seven entrants were non-starters, and, of the four runners, all but one retired on the first lap, leaving Eric Brandon in his Cooper Prototype (T2) trailing round to a virtual walk-over at an average speed of 55.79 mph (89.79 km/h), though his best lap (which was the fastest recorded for any 500) was 65.38 mph (105.22 km/h).

Cooper came to dominate the formula with mass-produced cars, and the income this generated enabled the company to develop into the senior categories. Other notable marques included Kieft, JBS and Emeryson in England, and Effyh, Monopoletta and Scampolo in Europe. John Cooper, along with most other 500 builders, decided to place the engine in the middle of the car, driving the rear wheels. This was mostly due to the practical limitations imposed by chain drive but it gave these cars exceptionally good handling characteristics which eventually led to the mid-engined revolution in single-seater racing.

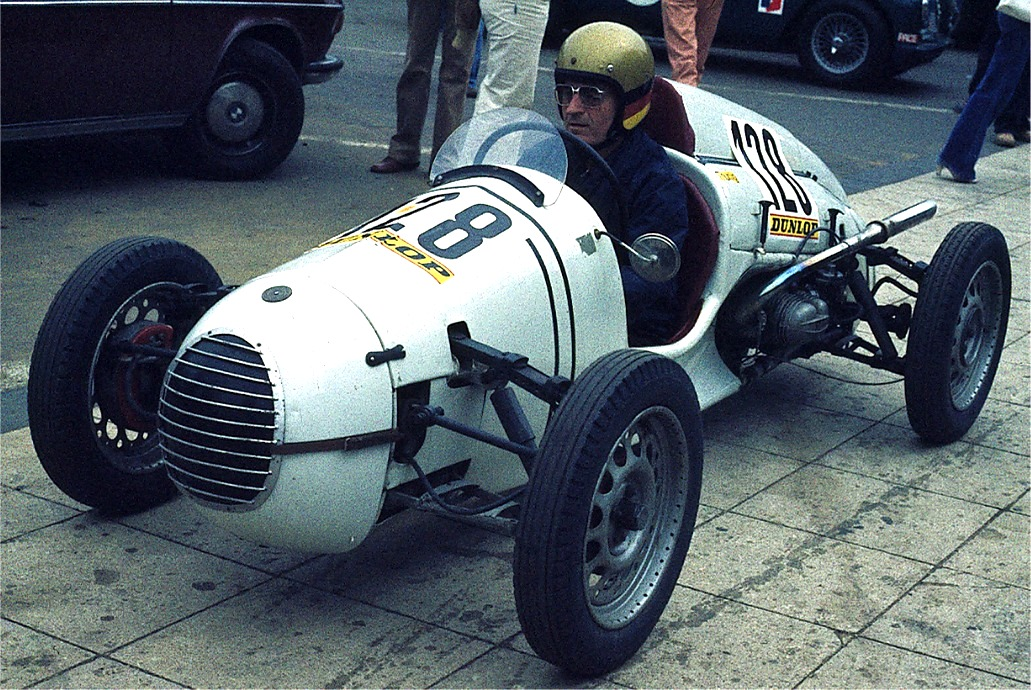
1949: Monopoletta-BMW

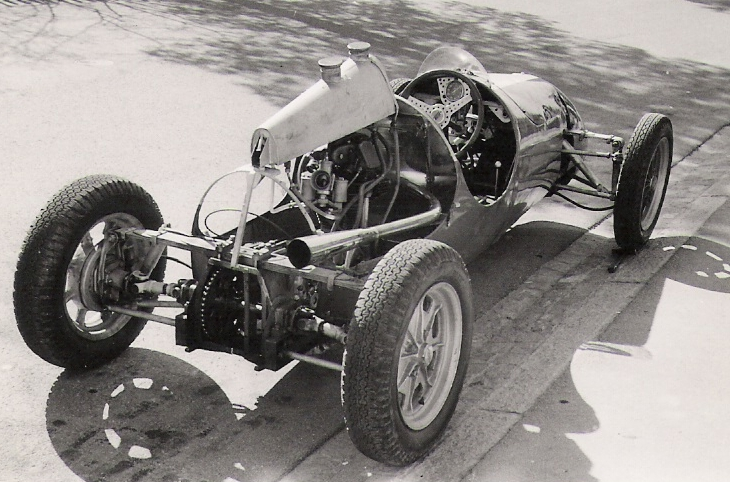
1950: Cooper Formula 500, Independent Rear Suspension, Norton Manx engine behind the driver..

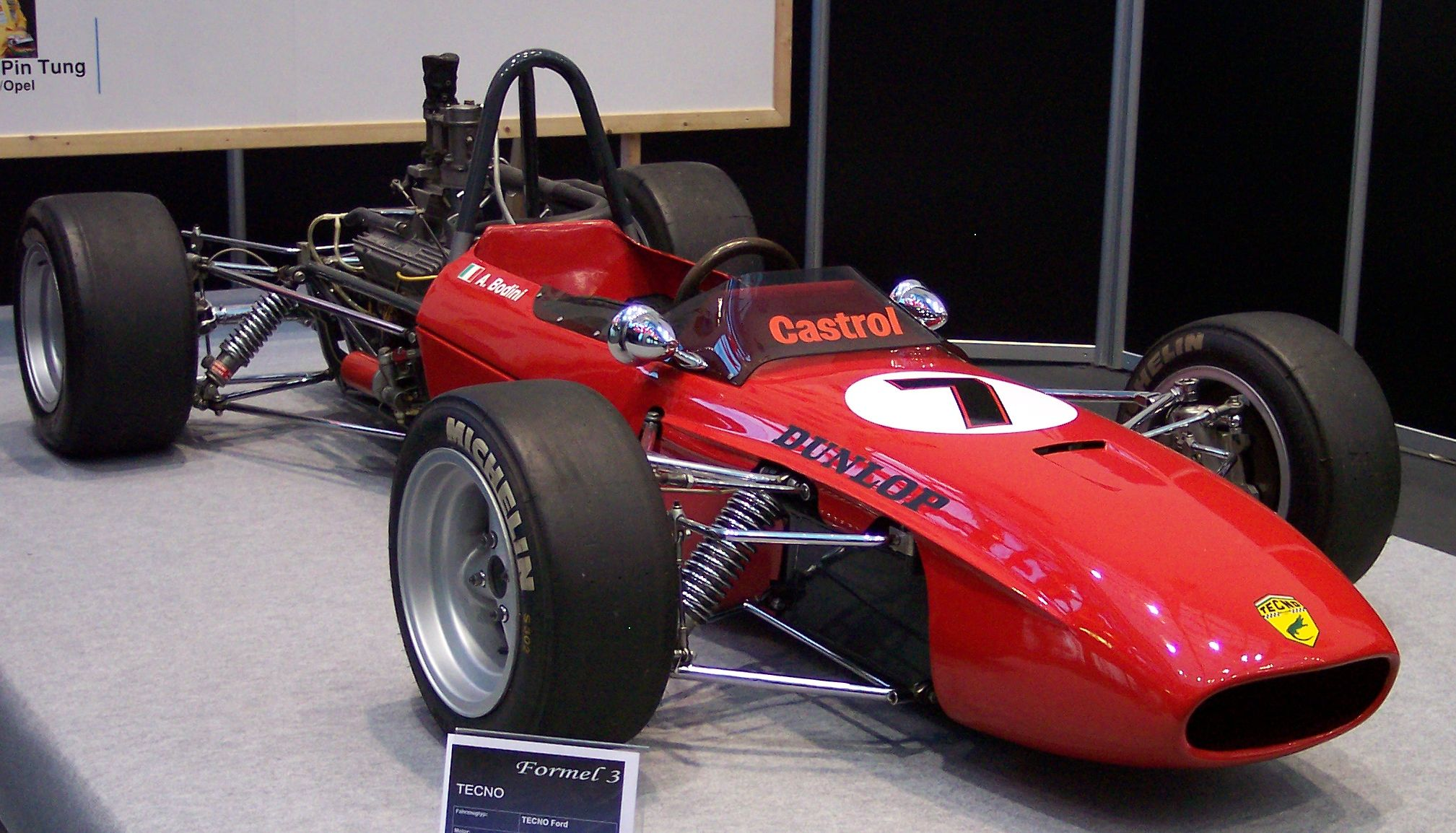
1960s: Tecno

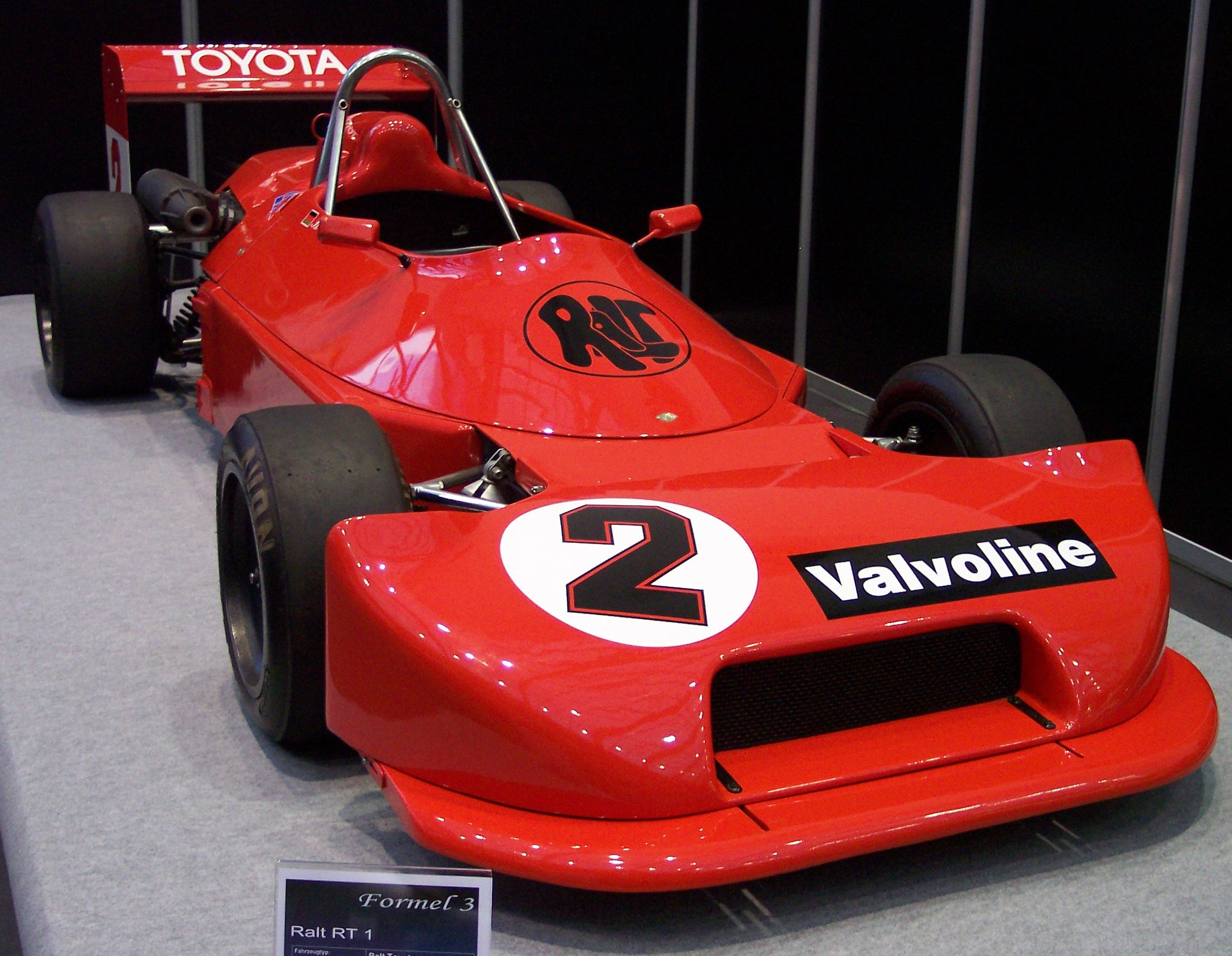
1970s: Ralt RT 1

The 500cc formula was the usual route into motor racing through the early and mid-1950s (and stars like Stirling Moss continued to enter selected F3 events even during their GP careers). Other notable 500 cc Formula 3 drivers include Stuart Lewis-Evans, Ivor Bueb, Jim Russell, Peter Collins, Don Parker, Ken Tyrrell, and Bernie Ecclestone.

From a statistical point of view, Parker was the most successful F3 driver. Although coming to motor racing late in life (at age 41 in 1949), he won a total of 126 F3 races altogether, and was described by Motor Sport magazine (in his 1998 obituary) as "the most successful Formula 3 driver in history". Although Stirling Moss was already a star by 1953, Parker beat him more than any other driver, and was Formula 3 Champion in 1952, again in 1953, and in 1954 he only lost the title by a half-point. He took the title for a third time in 1959.

500cc Formula Three declined at an international level during the late 1950s, although it continued at a national level into the early 60s, being eclipsed by Formula Junior for 1000 or 1100 cc cars (on a sliding scale of weights).

A one-litre Formula Three category for four-cylinder carburetted cars, with heavily tuned production engines, was reintroduced in 1964 based on the Formula Junior rules and ran to 1970. These engines (a short-stroke unit based on the Ford Anglia with a special 2-valve Cosworth or Holbay OHV down-draught head, initially pioneered by Brian Hart, being by far the most efficient and popular) tended to rev very highly and were popularly known as "screamers"; F3 races tended to involve large packs of slipstreaming cars. The "screamer" years were dominated by Brabham, Lotus and Tecno, with March beginning in 1970. Early one-litre F3 chassis tended to descend from Formula Junior designs but quickly evolved.

For 1971 new regulations allowing 1600 cc engines with a restricted air intake were introduced. The 1971–73 seasons were contested with these cars, as aerodynamics started to become important.

Two-litre engine rules were introduced for 1974, still with restricted air intakes. Today engine regulations remain basically unchanged in F3, a remarkable case of stability in racing regulations.

As the likes of Lotus and Brabham faded from F3 to concentrate on Formula One, F3 constructors of the 1970s included Alpine, Lola, March, Modus, GRD, Ralt, and Ensign. Various engine manufacturers enjoyed periods of dominance: when the 2-litre formula was first introduced, Ford was initially the most popular. Then, the reliable and powerful Toyota 2T-G engine, tuned by Novamotor of Italy, had several years on top. At the Monaco F3 race in 1977, for instance, all seven finishers (out of 20) used Nova-Toyota engines. Toyota was displaced by engines from Renault and then Alfa Romeo.

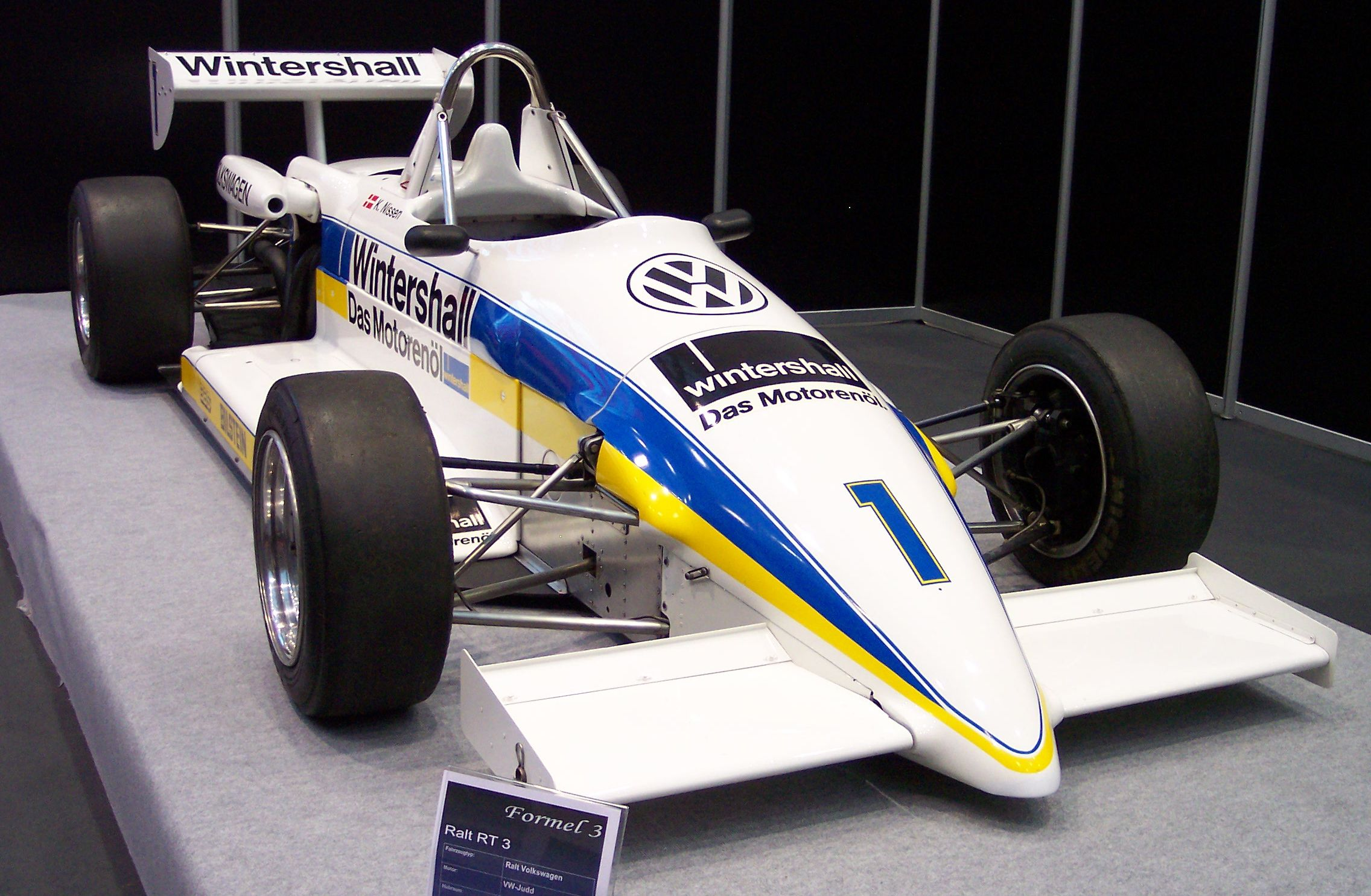
1980s: Ralt RT 3

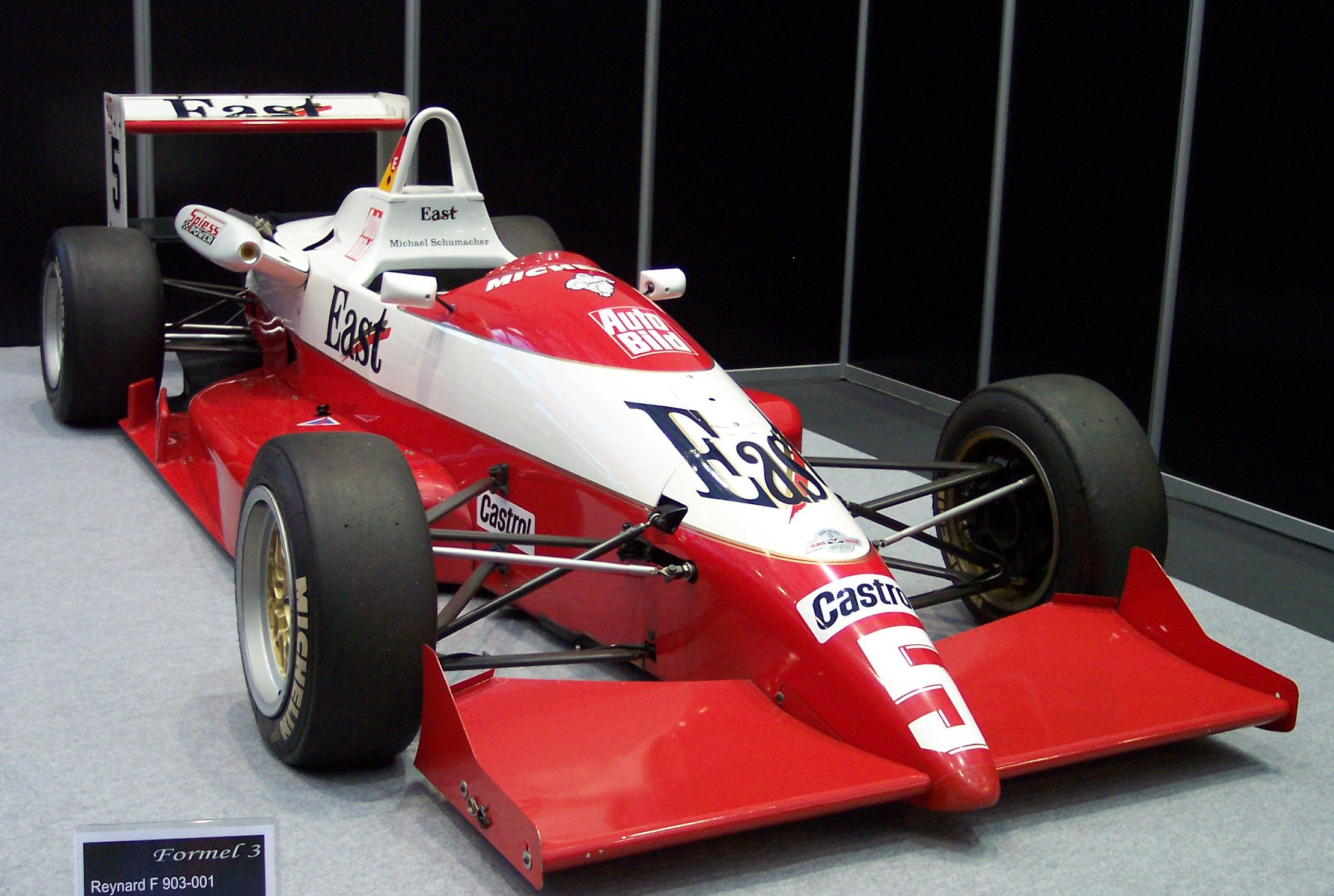
Early 1990s: Reynard 903

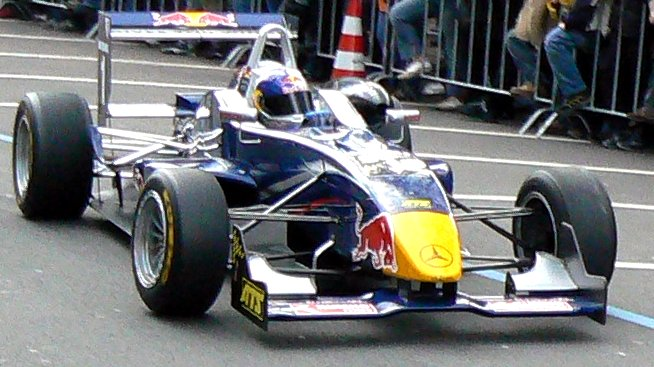
2000s: Dallara F305

By the start of the 1980s however, Formula Three had evolved well beyond its humble beginnings to something closely resembling the modern formula. It was seen as the main training ground for future Formula One drivers, many of them bypassing Formula Two to go straight into Grand Prix racing. The chassis became increasingly sophisticated, mirroring the more senior formulae – ground effects were briefly used in the early 1980s but were banned, in line with other FIA single-seater formulae; carbon fibre chassis started to be introduced from the mid-1980s.

Historically, March (up to 1981), Ralt (up to the early 1990s) and Reynard (1985–1992) had been the main chassis manufacturers in two-litre F3, with Martini fairly strong in France. Reynard pioneered the use of carbon fibre in the mid-1980s, replacing traditional aluminium or steel monocoque structures. However, after an unsuccessful Formula One project, Dallara decided to focus their attention on the formula in the early nineties and obliterated all the other marques with their F393. Within a couple of years, this chassis was considered a prerequisite to competitiveness, and today Dallara chassis are ubiquitous to the formula. In order to keep costs down, their chassis have had a three-year life-cycle, with only minor annual updates. It was agreed however to extend the life-cycle of the current F308 to four years to assist teams; this chassis however, has been replaced in 2012 with the new F312 chassis, intended to be run until 2017. Most F3 championships, most notably the British series, offer a secondary class for cars from the previous life-cycle in order to provide a cheap point of entry for lesser funded teams and drivers.

== F3 cars ==
Formula Three cars are monocoque chassis, using slick racing tyres and wings. Currently, Dallara manufactures the overwhelming majority of F3 cars, though Mygale, Lola (formerly in partnership with Dome of Japan), Arttech, and SLC also have a limited output. In many smaller or amateur F3 racing series older cars are frequently seen. Usually these series are divided into two or more classes, to allow more participation.

In 2019, FIA Formula 3 was introduced to provide a stepping stone to Formula 1. This series uses 3.4-litre, six-cylinder naturally aspirated spec engines built by Mecachrome.

Engines in other Formula 3 series must be built from a production model block (stock block), and often must be sealed by race or series organizers, so no private tuning can be carried out. Honda engines (prepared by Mugen) have perennially been popular, as have engines produced by Volkswagen, Alfa Romeo, or Renault. Currently the HWA-tuned Mercedes and the Volkswagen engines dominate the British and European series, with Mugen, TOM'S–Toyota, Opel, and Fiat being used by some teams.

=== Car regulations ===
- Width: 1,150 mm (45.3 in) maximum
- Wheelbase: 2,000 mm (78.7 in) minimum
- Track: 1,200 mm (47.2 in) minimum
- Weight: 550 kg (1,213 lb) minimum including driver
- Active suspension, telemetry, and traction control are forbidden
- Two-wheel steering only
- Two-wheel drive only (rear-wheel-drive)
- Sequential paddle-shift gearbox, six forward gears (maximum), and one reverse
- Undrilled ferrous brakes
- Wheels, width 9.5 in (241 mm), diameter 13 in (330 mm) maximum
- Fuel capacity: 45 litres (12 US gal)
- Controlled fuel from a single supplier, but of a comparative standard to pump/street gasoline (petrol)
- Stock derived 2.0 L (122 cu in) engine with 28 mm (1.1 in) width restrictor for regional Formula 3 hence about 260 hp, or 3.4 L (207 cu in) for international Formula 3 hence about 380 hp (280 kW)

Complete regulations: "fia.com" (PDF). (1213 kiB)

== Championships and series ==
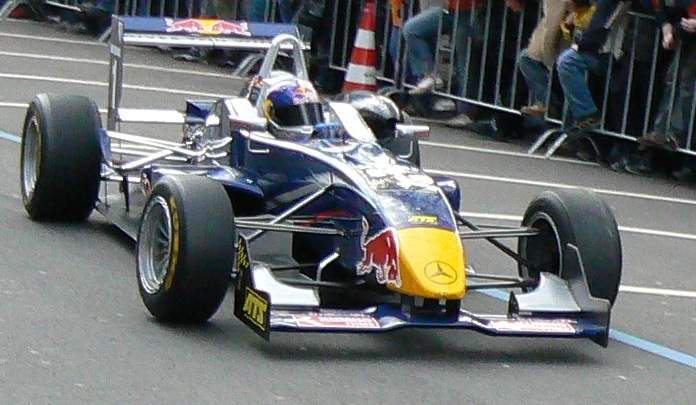
Sebastian Vettel demonstrating his Formula 3 Euro Series car (2006)

Until the launch of the FIA Formula 3 Championship in 2019, there had never been a global championship for Formula Three. In the 1970s and into the 1980s the European Formula Three Championship and British Formula 3 Championship (once one series had emerged from the competing British series in the 1970s) were the most prominent, with a number of future Formula One champions coming from them. France, Germany, and Italy also had important Formula Three series, but interest in these was originally subsidiary to national formulae – Formula Renault in France and Formula Super Vee in Germany. These nations eventually drifted towards Formula Three. The Italian series tended to attract older drivers who moved straight across from karting whereas in other nations drivers typically graduated to F3 after a couple of years in minor categories. The European series died out in the mid-1980s and the national series became correspondingly more important. For 2003, French and German F3, both suffering from a lack of competitive entrants, merged to recreate the Formula 3 Euro Series.

The SudAm Formula Three Championship uses the most powerful engines among all global Formula Three series. Historically, the championship was recognized for developing drivers who later transitioned to the British Formula 3 Championship to further refine their skills. In East Asia, the All-Japan Formula Three Championship served as a notable competitive circuit; while few international drivers spent a significant amount of time there, future Formula One drivers such as Ralf Schumacher and Jacques Villeneuve achieved victories there. Additionally, an Asian F3 series was established in 2001, eventually producing drivers who competed for Indonesia and Australia in the A1 Grand Prix.

=== Special races ===
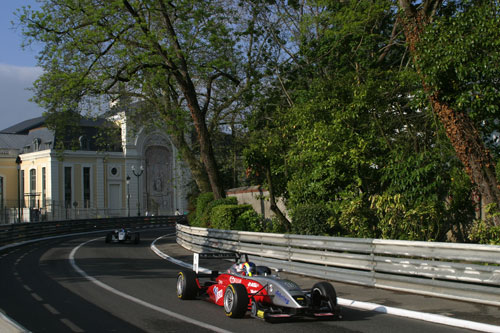
Átila Abreu driving for Mücke Motorsport during the 2005 Pau Grand Prix in France

In addition to the many national series, Formula Three is known for major non-championship races typically including entries from the national series, the best-known of which is the FIA Formula 3 World Cup (previously known as FIA Formula 3 Intercontinental Cup) at Macau. The first Formula Three Grand Prix of Macau was held in 1983 and won by Ayrton Senna. Michael Schumacher, David Coulthard, Ralf Schumacher, and Takuma Sato have also won there. The Formula Three Grand Prix of Macau traditionally marks the end of the Formula Three season, with drivers from almost every national series participating.

Other major races include the Pau Grand Prix (from 1999 to 2006), the Masters of Formula 3 (traditionally held at Zandvoort), and the Korea Super Prix at Changwon. These events give fans in locations not visited by other major series a way to experience major international racing.

The Monaco F3 Grand Prix held until 1997 was also a famous special race. It was restored in 2005 only, as a part of the F3 Euro Series.

=== List of Formula Three series ===
==== Current series ====
Series name	Zone/country	Active years	Additional information
FIA Formula 3 regulations
FIA Formula 3 Championship	International	2019–	Replaced the GP3 Series and the FIA Formula 3 European Championship in 2019.
FIA Formula Regional regulations
(United States) (Canada) Formula Regional Americas Championship	North America	2018–	Was known as F3 Americas until 2019.
(European Union) Formula Regional European Championship	Europe	2019–	Replaced the Formula Regional European Championship and the Formula Renault Eurocup in 2021.
(Japan) Formula Regional Japanese Championship	Japan	2020–	K2 acquired Formula Regional rights for 2020 after Japanese Formula 3 Championship officials changed specifications away from Formula Regional, thereby abandoning nomenclature rights under FIA rules.
(United Arab Emirates) (Qatar) Formula Regional Middle East Championship	Asia	2023–	Replaced the Formula Regional Asian Championship in 2023.
(New Zealand) Formula Regional Oceania Championship	New Zealand	2023–	The series switched to the Formula Regional chassis for 2020 and rebranded as Formula Regional championship from 2023 onwards.
(European Union) Eurocup-3	Europe	2023-	Eurocup-3 is a single-seater series bridging F4 and F3, often running alongside the Spanish Formula 4. Since 2024, it also features a short Winter Series as a season warm-up.
Former FIA F3 regulations
(United Kingdom) Monoposto Championship	United Kingdom	1977–	Monoposto racing championship runs Formula 3 cars up to the 2011 year MY of the Dallara chassis. Featuring a BOP to ensure fair racing between the years. F3 A class cars have F3 engines for cars between 2005 and 2011, and F3B have F3 engines up to 2004, or cars with Mono spec. engine up to 2011. The series is open to many engine manufacturers.
(Austria) Drexler-Automotive Formula 3 Cup	Austria	1982, 1984–	"Drexler-Automotive Formel 3 Pokal" for the main Cup and "Drexler-Automotive Formel 3 Trophy" for B division older chassis cars.
(European Union) FIA Central European Zone Formula 3	Europe	1994–2005, 2016–	
(Australia) Australian Formula Open Series	Australia	1999–2019, 2021–	
(Italy) F2000 Italian Formula Trophy	Italy	2014–	Formerly known as F2 Italian Trophy. Mainly running older F3 chassis and engines.
Euroformula regulations - based on 2018 F3-chassis
(European Union) Euroformula Open Championship	Europe	2009–	Formerly the Spanish Formula Three Championship. The Spanish Formula Three title continues to exist as a sub-championship.
(Japan) Super Formula Lights	Japan	2020–	Formerly the Japanese Formula 3 Championship until 2019, when the series adopted Euroformula Open Championship regulations in 2020, forcing a name change.
GB3 Championship regulations (Upgraded FIA Formula 4)
(United Kingdom) GB3 Championship	United Kingdom	2016–	Although called British Formula 3 in the UK, this is to avoid confusion with Formula 4. The car is a Tatuus Formula 4 tub with superior aerodynamics to the F4 cars in other series. The engines are tuned 2 liter Ford Duratec engines without air restrictor.
Planned Series
(Australia) AU3 Championship	Australia	2026-	AU3 is an Australian Formula Regional series launched in 2025, bridging F4 and international F3. It uses Tatuus FT-60 cars and offers top drivers European test opportunities
(India) Formula Regional Indian Championship	India		The Formula Regional Indian Championship was set to start in early 2022 but was postponed and eventually canceled. It remains a planned series with hopes for a future launch.

==== Defunct series ====
Series name	Zone/country	Active years	Additional information
German Formula Three Championship	Germany	1950–1953; 1971–2014	The main Championship merged into the Formula 3 Euro Series in 2003. A lower-level Formula 3 Cup was run between 2003 and 2014.
British Formula Three Championship	United Kingdom	1951–1961; 1964–2014	
Soviet Formula 3 Championship	Soviet Union	1960–1987	The championship was cancelled due to the financial problems of the Soviet Union and later replaced with Russian Formula Three Championship
Italian Formula Three Championship	Italy	1958–1966; 1968–2012	
FIA European Formula 3 Championship	Europe	1975–1984	
Formula 3 Euro Series	Europe	2003–2012	Incorporated into the FIA Formula 3 European Championship from 2013
FIA Formula 3 International Trophy	International	2011	Replaced by the revived FIA Formula 3 European Championship in 2012
FIA Formula 3 European Championship	Europe	2012–2018	Replaced the FIA Formula 3 International Trophy and Formula 3 Euro Series. In 2019, joined with GP3 Series, to create FIA Formula 3 Championship
Japanese Formula 3 Championship	Japan	1979–2019	With the rebranding of the series to Super Formula Lights, the Japanese Formula 3 Championship officially ended after 41 years.
Spanish Formula Three Championship	Spain	2001–2008	Replaced by European F3 Open Championship
Formula Three Sudamericana	South America	1987–2013	Replaced by Fórmula 3 Brasil
Brazilian Formula Three Championship	Brazil	1989–1995; 2014–2017	Replaced Formula Three Sudamericana in 2014, renamed to Super Fórmula Brasil, but canceled in 2018.
French Formula Three Championship	France	1964–1973; 1978–2002	Replaced by Formula 3 Euro Series
Belgian Formula Three Championship	Belgium	1964–1967	
Swedish Formula 3 Championship	Sweden	1964–1994; 1997–2000	
Danish Formula 3 Championship	Denmark	1949–1966; 1976–1977	
Norwegian Formula 3 Championship	Norway	1999–2000	
Scandinavian & Nordic Formula Three Championship	Scandinavia	1984–1985; 1992–2001	
Finnish Formula Three Championship	Finland	1958–1960; 1984–1986; 2000–2010	Known as Nordic Formula Three Masters in 2010
North European Zone Formula 3 Cup	Northern Europe	2008–2009	
Russian Formula Three Championship	Russia	1997–2002; 2008	
Greece Formula 3 Championship	Greece	1990–2002	
Turkish Formula Three Championship	Turkey	1994–2006	
Swiss F3 Championship	Switzerland	1978–2008, 2014–2021	Run as Cup sub-division of the Austria Formula 3 Cup from 2014 to 2021
East German Formula Three Championship	East Germany	1950–1958; 1964–1972	
Asian Formula Three Championship	Asia	2001–2008	Known as the Asian F3 Pacific Series from 2007–2008.
United States Formula Three Championship	United States	2000–2001	
Mexican Formula Three Championship	Mexico	1990–2002	
Mexican Formula Three International Championship	Mexico	1990–2003	
MSV Formula 3 Cup	United Kingdom	1986–2021	Precusors of MSV Formula 3 Cup were Toyota F3 Championship, ARP F3 Championship, Club F3 and BRSCC F3. MotorSport Vision took over BRSCC F3 in 2011. MSV F3 Cup folded in 2020. It was run by the Monoposto Racing Club in 2021 before being integrated into their series.
Formula Lites	United States	2015	
Formula Renault Eurocup	Europe	2019–2020	The series utilized Formula 3 chassis for the first time and new 1.8-litre turbocharged engine in 2019. The 2020 season was the final Formula Renault Eurocup season organised by Renault Sport, as starting from 2021 it merged with the Formula Regional European Championship.
W Series	International	2019, 2021–2022	Formula Regional championship exclusively for women
Chilean Formula Three Championship	Chile	1972–1974 1976–2012 2016–2019	The Chilean championship did not follow the FIA's Formula 3 regulations.

==== Special races ====
Event	Track	Region	Country	Championship	Years
Events
FIA Formula 3 World Cup	Guia Circuit	Macau	Macau	standalone event	1983–2019, 2023
New Zealand Grand Prix	alternating	alternating	New Zealand	Formula Regional Oceania Championship	2020–2021, 2023–
Grand Prix de Pau	Circuit de Pau-Ville	Pau	France	Euroformula Open Championship	1999–2006, 2011–2012, 2014–2019, 2022
Masters of Formula 3	Circuit Park Zandvoort	Zandvoort	Netherlands	standalone event	1991–2016
Formula 3 Brazil Open	Autódromo José Carlos Pace	São Paulo	Brazil	standalone event	2010–2014
Eastside 100	EuroSpeedway Lausitz	Klettwitz	Germany	German Formula Three Championship	2005–2006
Monaco Formula Three Grand Prix	Circuit de Monaco	Monte Carlo	Monaco		1950, 1959–1997, 2005
Korea Super Prix	Changwon Street Circuit	Changwon	South Korea	standalone event	1999–2004
FIA European Formula Three Cup	alternating	alternating	Europe	standalone event	1985–1990, 1999–2004
Inter F3 League	Fuji Speedway	Oyama	Japan	standalone event	1990–1993
Australian Grand Prix F3 Support Race	Albert Park Circuit	Melbourne	Australia	standalone event	2006–2007
Indy 300 F3 Challenge	Surfers Paradise Street Circuit	Surfers Paradise	Australia	standalone event	2008
Wakefield Park Open Wheel Festival	Wakefield Park	Goulburn	Australia	standalone event	2017
New Race Festival	Circuit Zolder	Heusden-Zolder	Belgium	standalone event	1999–2000
MRF Madras Formula 3 Grand Prix	Madras International Circuit	Chennai	India	standalone event	1995, 1999
Sardinia F3 Masters	Circuito di Cagliari	Cagliari	Italy	standalone event	2003
Lady Wigram Trophy	Ruapana Park	Christchurch	New Zealand	standalone event	2003–2004
Privilege Formula Festival International	Circuit Paul Armagnac	Nogaro	France	standalone event	1992–1993
Japanese Grand Prix F3 Support Race	Suzuka Circuit	Suzuka	Japan	standalone event	1988–1993
Cellnet Superprix	Brands Hatch	Kent	United Kingdom	standalone event	1988
