= Biddestone =

Village in Wiltshire, England

Coordinates: 51.460°N 2.198°W

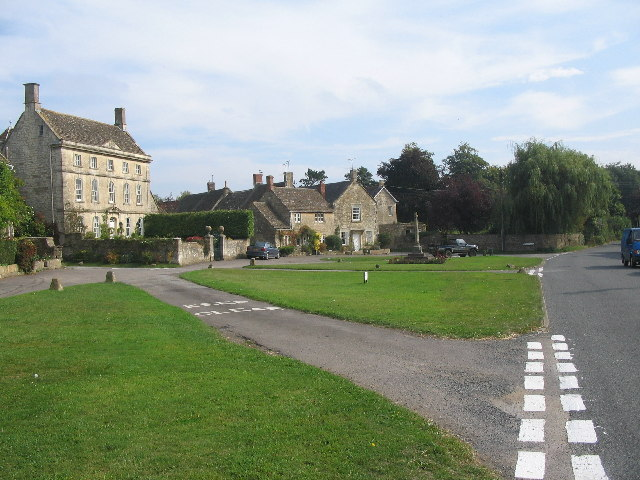
- Biddestone's large village green

- Location within Wiltshire
- Population: 498 (in 2011)
- OS grid reference: ST863735
- Civil parish: Biddestone and Slaughterford
- Unitary authority: Wiltshire
- Ceremonial county: Wiltshire
- Region: South West
- Country: England
- Sovereign state: United Kingdom
- Post town: CHIPPENHAM
- Postcode district: SN14
- Dialling code: 01249
- Police: Wiltshire
- Fire: Dorset and Wiltshire
- Ambulance: South Western
- UK Parliament: South Cotswolds
- Website: Parish Council

Biddestone is a village and former civil parish, now in the parish of Biddestone and Slaughterford, in northwest Wiltshire, England, about 3 miles (5 km) west of Chippenham and 2 miles (3.2 km) north of Corsham. The parish includes the smaller settlement of Slaughterford.

== Geography ==
The Bybrook River forms the western boundary of the parish, while the northern boundary follows approximately the Bristol to Chippenham road, now the A420.

The parish is just inside the eastern boundary of the Cotswolds Area of Outstanding Natural Beauty. Sites of Special Scientific Interest include Honeybrook Farm and Colerne Park and Monk's Wood, both near Slaughterford.

== History ==
The name Biddestone derives from the Old English Biedinstūn or Biedestūn, meaning 'Biedin/Biede's settlement'.

A settlement at Bedestone, with four households, was recorded in Domesday Book in 1086.

The Grade II* listed Manor House (at the southeast entrance to the village) and Manor Farmhouse are from the 17th century, as are Pool Farmhouse and Elm Cottage (both south of the village green). Willow House, north of the green, is dated 1730: a three-storey house with a formal five-bay south front.

== Local government ==
The civil parish elects a parish council. It is in the area of Wiltshire Council unitary authority, which is responsible for all significant local government functions.

The parish of Biddestone was formed on 25 March 1885 from Biddestone St Peter and Biddestone St Nicholas. On 1 April 1934, the parish of Slaughterford was abolished and its area added to Biddestone; at the 1931 census, a population of 67 had been recorded for Slaughterford and 420 for Biddestone. On 1 July 2022, the merged parish was renamed "Biddestone and Slaughterford".

== Religious sites ==
=== Parish church ===
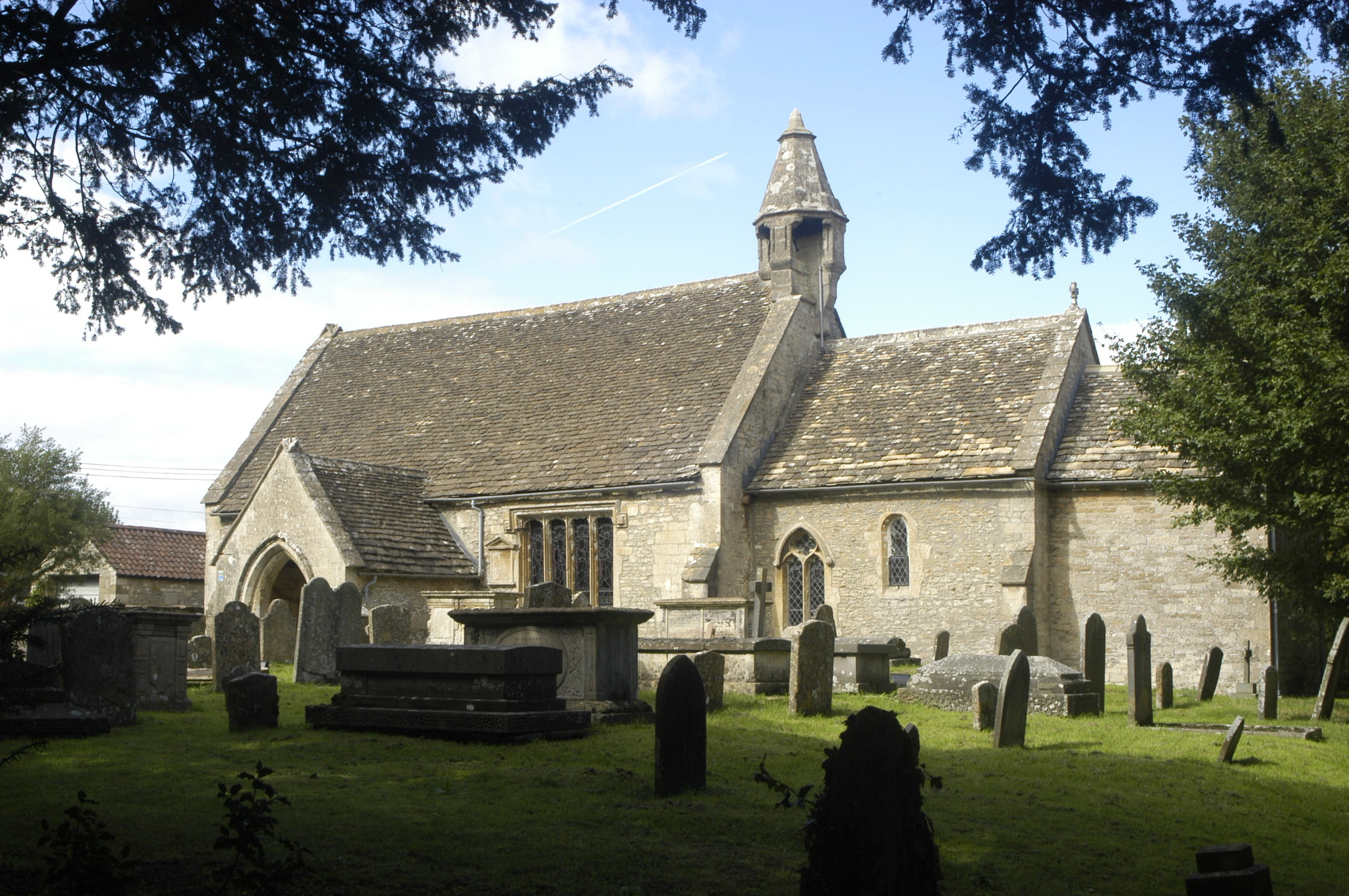
St Nicholas' Church

The Church of England parish church of St Nicholas is Grade I listed.

It was built in the 12th century in rubble stone, on the foundations of an older church; the south door (with a pair of columns, and a cross in the tympanum) and two windows in the chancel survive from that period, while the rest of the building dates from the 13th and 14th centuries. The east gable of the nave has a 13th-century bell-turret described as "remarkable" by Nikolaus Pevsner.

Apart from changes to the windows and the 15th-century rebuilding of the chancel arch and addition of a short octagonal stone spire to the bell-turret, the church was unaltered until the mid-19th century. Then the roofs were renewed and stone from the demolition of St Peter's church was used to extend the chancel to form a sanctuary. The nave was restored in 1900.

The stone font with zigzag decoration is from the 12th century, and the eroded or defaced heads at the corners of its base may be 13th-century. The panelled west gallery on thin iron columns is from the late 17th century, and the box pews are from c.1800.

Sometime before 1953, the benefice was united with Slaughterford. Today the parish is part of the Bybrook Benefice, a group of ten rural parishes.

=== Others ===
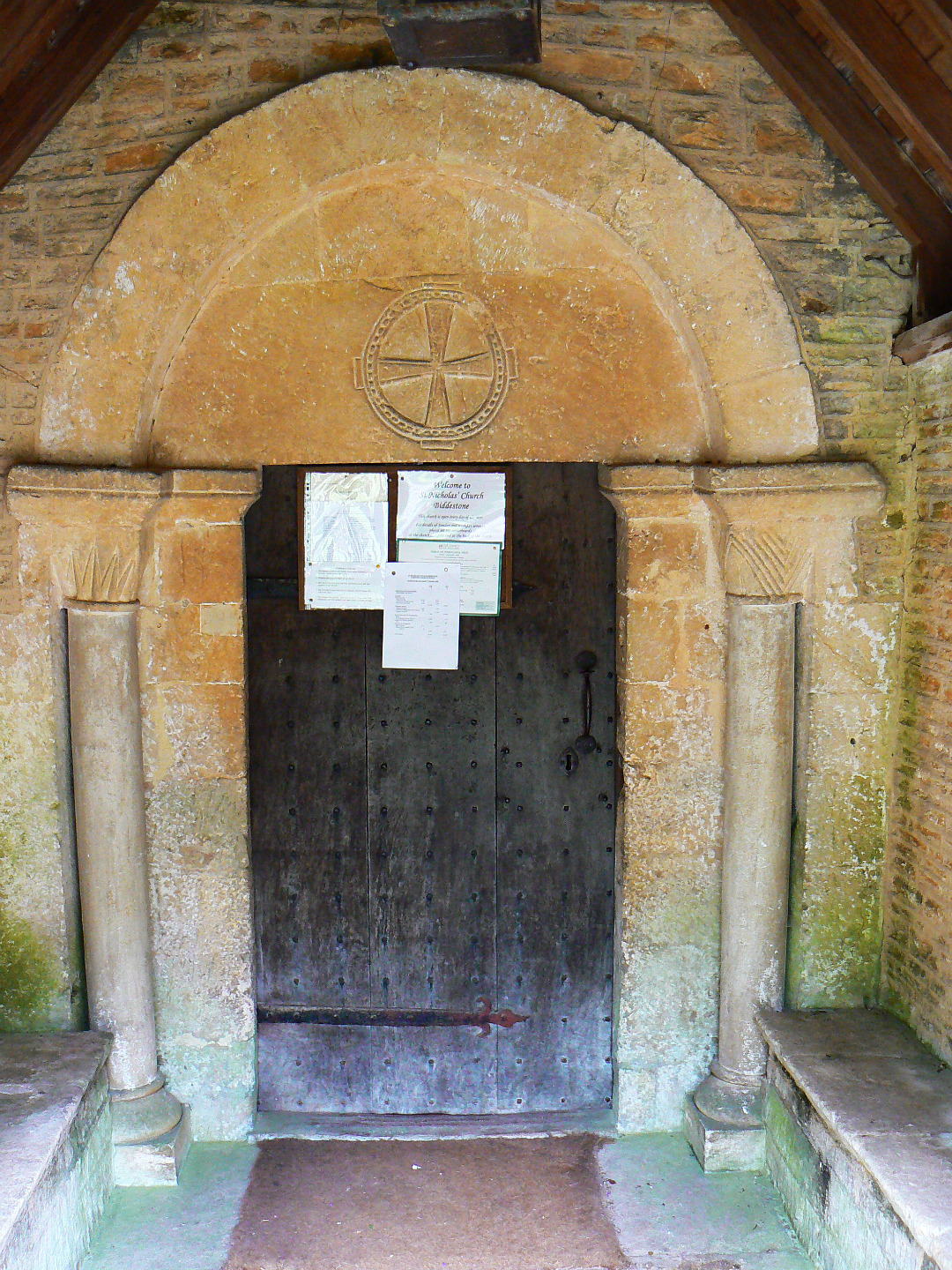
South door of St Nicholas' Church

A church of St Peter, on the eastern side of the village, was demolished in 1846. Possibly of Saxon origin and larger than St Nicholas', it had been rebuilt in 1430. Its bell-cote was acquired by G. P. Scrope and made into a garden seat at his house, Castle Combe Manor.

Biddestone Baptist chapel, dated 1832 and formerly known as Ebenezer Chapel, is Grade II listed. By 2009 it had fallen into disuse.

A small Methodist chapel stands at the northern extreme of the village, at the junction with Slaughterford Road. By 2009 this too was disused; records survive for the period 1960–1979.

Slaughterford has its own church, also dedicated to St Nicholas, and had a Quaker meeting house.

== Amenities ==
The village has one pub, the White Horse. The Crown Inn at Giddeahall on the A420 is just outside the parish.

There is no primary school; most children travel to By Brook Valley CE Primary School in nearby Yatton Keynell, which was built to amalgamate the small primary schools in Biddestone, Yatton Keynell, Castle Combe and Nettleton. The school at Biddestone, which also served Slaughterford, was built in 1844 and enlarged in 1875, and took children of all ages until 1945. It was closed in 1998 owing to falling pupil numbers.

Honeybrook Farm, in the Bybrook valley in the west of the parish, is a biological Site of Special Scientific Interest.

=== Sports clubs ===
The Cricket Club, based at the village hall, plays in the Gloucestershire & Wiltshire division. It was established in 1949 and in 2024 is celebrating its 75th year. It has three senior league teams, a senior team named "The Swingers", women's and girls' teams, as well as a junior section.

The Tennis Club has four floodlit courts. They play in the Chippenham and District tennis league, entering both men's and women's A, B and C teams.

The newest sports club in the village is Biddestone Boules. Following years of running the September Biddy Boules competition, in 2023 a permanent boules pitch was built at the rear of the village hall.

=== Events ===
A traditional English fete is held on The Green in Biddestone, every year on the third Saturday in June.

A music festival called Biddstock was founded in 2015 by Matt Powell and Gordon Stanley, and is held at the village playing fields. The festival raised over £27,000 for local good causes from the first four biannual events. The 2024 edition was held on 6 July.

== Film location ==
Biddestone was a filming location for the TV film Agatha Raisin and the Quiche of Death (2014), and for The Christmas Candle (2013).
