= Honeybrook Farm =

Farm in Wiltshire, England

Coordinates: 51.457°N 2.228°W

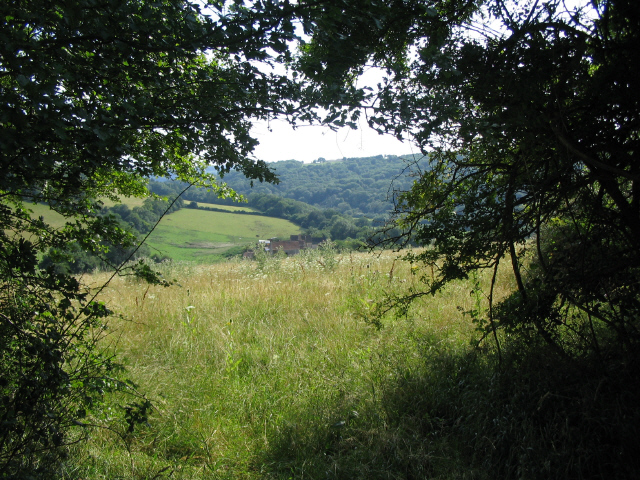
Honeybrook Farm

Honeybrook Farm (grid reference ST841730) is a working farm three miles (4.8 km) south of Castle Combe in Wiltshire, England, between the villages of Biddestone and Slaughterford. The farm has a total area of sixty-five hectares (160 acres), of which forty-two point four one hectares (104.8 acres) are designated as a biological Site of Special Scientific Interest.

== Land ==
Honeybrook Farm is situated within the Cotswolds National Landscape (formerly known as Area of Outstanding Natural Beauty, or AONB) and the Bybrook River. The SSSI was designated due to the national importance of the herb-rich meadows and high quality calcareous grassland. The farmers have a small herd of Herefords, some sheep and grow a small amount of Spring barley.

Honeybrook Farm is one of only a few British lowland farms which have retained a low-intensity management where agricultural chemicals have never been utilised. The farm is underlain by the oolitic limestone of the Wiltshire Cotswolds, and there are two parts a dry combe to the east and part of the flood plain of the By Brook to the west. Rocks of the Bridport Sand Formation emerge at the base of the limestone where it meets the floodplain.

== Flora ==
The grasses and herb which grow in the farm's hay meadows are indicative of the long period that the land has been managed non intensively. The untreated sward has a wide variety and abundance of typical herbs of such meadows such as black knapweed (Centaurea nigra), yellow rattle (Rhinanthus minor) and bird's-foot-trefoil (Lotus corniculatus). The high lime content of the soil in the hay meadows is demonstrated by presence of plants such as the frequent salad burnet (Sanguisorba minor), upright brome (Bromus erectus), hoary plantain (Plantago media) and rough hawkbit (Leontodon hispidus). Where there are wet field edges species which favour damper conditions are found including common meadow-rue (Thalictrum flavum), a localised species in North Wiltshire. Where the meadows are borders by ditches these support a rich wetland vegetation while the transition between the meadows and the nearby ancient woodland supports a rich flora which is now rare in lowland Britain.

== Archaeology ==
Artifacts from Roman Britain have been found near the farm.
