= C20H23NO4 =

The molecular formula C_{20}H_{23}NO_{4} may refer to:

- Efaproxiral, an allosteric effector of hemoglobin
- Isopavine, an alkaloid
- 6-Monoacetylcodeine, a codein ester
- Naltrexone, a medication primarily used to manage alcohol dependence
- Pavine, an alkaloid found in poppy species
- Thebacon, a semisynthetic opioid used as an analgesic
