= Pavine =

Pavine may refer to:

- Pavine (dance), a slow processional dance common in Europe during the 16th century
- Pavine (molecule), an alkaloid
