= Papaver arvense =

Papaver arvense is a botanical synonym of two species of plant:

- Papaver rhoeas, synonym published in 1796 by Richard Anthony Salisbury
- Roemeria argemone, synonym published in 1793 by Moritz Balthasar Borkhausen
