= Shockerwick House =

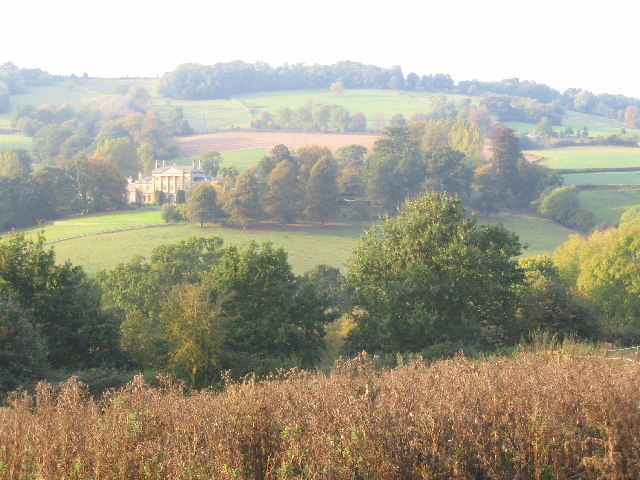

- Location within Somerset
- 51°24′04″N 2°18′14″W
- Location: Bathford, Somerset, England

History
- Built: c. 1750

Listed Building – Grade I
- Official name: Shockerwick House
- Designated: 1 February 1956
- Reference no.: 1157865

Shockerwick House in Bathford, Somerset, England was built as a manor house around 1750 by John Wood, the Elder. It has been designated as a Grade I listed building. It is set in 7.7 hectares (19 acres) of parkland within the Bybrook River valley.

The site was a manor prior to its purchase in 1740, from the estate of Anthony Carew, by the Wiltshire family. The Wiltshires commissioned John Wood, the Elder to design the house and grounds. Thomas Gainsborough was a frequent visitor and painted several canvases in the orangery of the house including that of Edward Orpin, Parish Clerk of Bradford-upon-Avon which is now in the Tate. Another visitor was William Pitt the Younger who was at Shockerwick when he heard about Napoleon's victory at the Battle of Austerlitz.

In the 1880s the house was bought by Charles Morley the Member of Parliament for Breconshire. The house was altered in 1896 by Ernest George and Alfred B. Yeates. The Morley family owned the house until 1955. In 1961 it was bought by Henry Pelham-Clinton-Hope, 9th Duke of Newcastle who sold it in 1970 to the W.D. & H.O. Wills tobacco company who used it as a training centre.

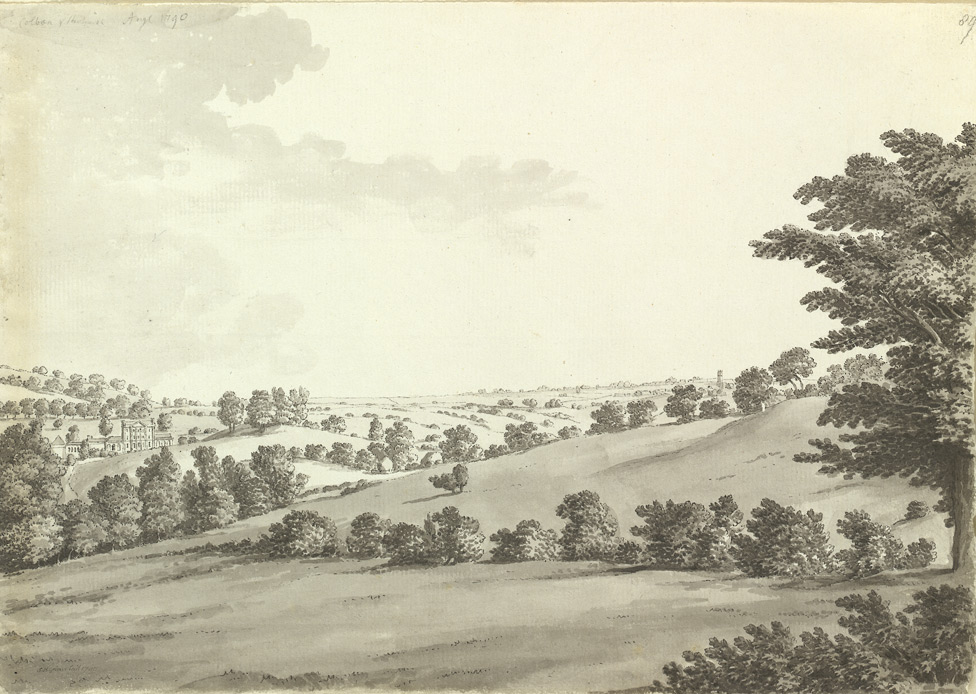
Shockerwick House. Ink wash on paper by Samuel Hieronymus Grimm in 1790

Since 1983 it has been used as a Nursing Home and is run by Bupa.

== See also ==
- List of Grade I listed buildings in Bath and North East Somerset
