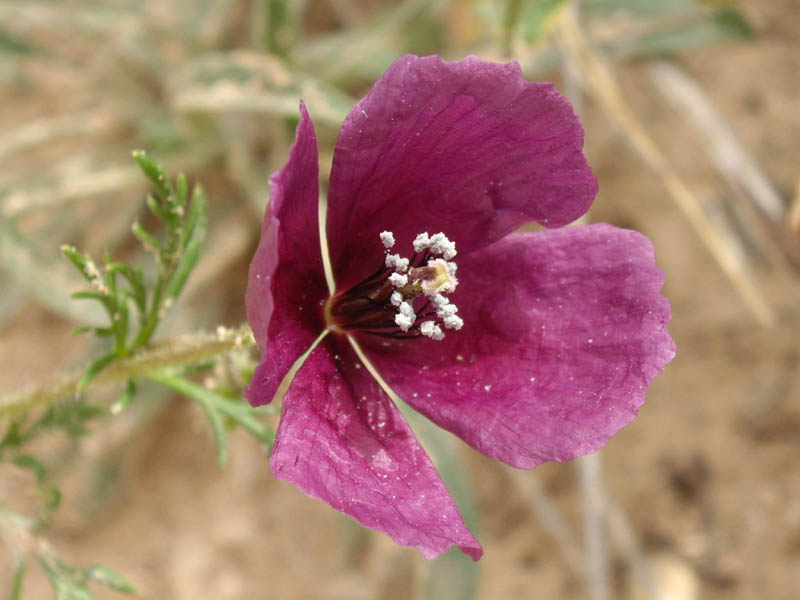
- Roemeria hybrida

Scientific classification
- Kingdom: Plantae
- Clade: Tracheophytes
- Clade: Angiosperms
- Clade: Eudicots
- Order: Ranunculales
- Family: Papaveraceae
- Subfamily: Papaveroideae
- Tribe: Papavereae
- Genus: Roemeria; Medik.

Species
- See text

= Roemeria =

Genus of Papaveraceae plants

Roemeria is a genus of flowering plants in the family Papaveraceae, native to Macaronesia, Europe, the Mediterranean, North Africa, the Caucasus, the Middle East, the Arabian Peninsula, Central Asia, the western Himalayas, Pakistan, Xinjiang, and Mongolia. A 2006 molecular analysis revised the taxonomy of Papaver, elevating Roemeria to the genus level, and including the species formerly in Papaver sect. Argemonidium.

== Species ==
The following sixteen species are accepted according to Plants of the World Online:

- Roemeria apula (Ten.) Banfi, Bartolucci, J.-M.Tison & Galasso
- Roemeria argemone (L.) C.Morales, R.Mend. & Romero García
- Roemeria armenii (M.V.Agab.) Banfi, Bartolucci, J.-M.Tison & Galasso
- Roemeria carica A.Baytop
- Roemeria davisii (Kadereit) Banfi, Bartolucci, J.-M.Tison & Galasso
- Roemeria hybrida (L.) DC.
- Roemeria macrostigma Bien. ex Fedde
- Roemeria meiklei (Kadereit) Banfi, Bartolucci, J.-M.Tison & Galasso
- Roemeria minor (Boivin) Banfi, Bartolucci, J.-M.Tison & Galasso
- Roemeria nigrotincta (Fedde) Banfi, Bartolucci, J.-M.Tison & Galasso
- Roemeria ocellata (Woronow) Banfi, Bartolucci, J.-M.Tison & Galasso
- Roemeria pavonina (Schrenk) Banfi, Bartolucci, J.-M.Tison & Galasso
- Roemeria procumbens Aarons. & Oppenh.
- Roemeria refracta DC.
- Roemeria sicula (Guss.) Galasso, Banfi, L.Sáez & Bartolucci
- Roemeria virchowii (Asch. & Sint. ex Boiss.) Banfi, Bartolucci, J.-M.Tison & Galasso
