= Bybrook River =

River in South Gloucestershire and Wiltshire, England

Bybrook By Brook
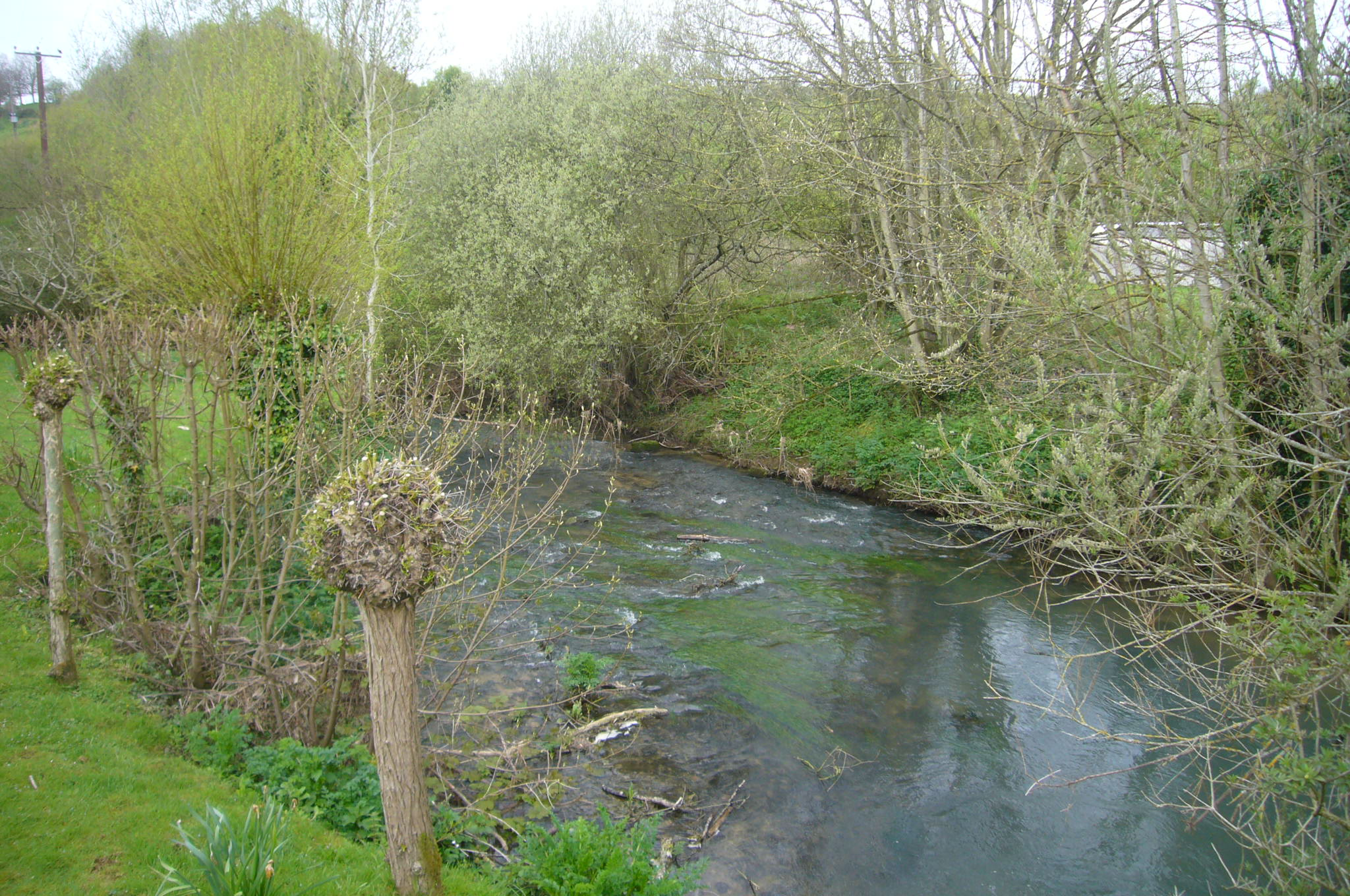
- The Bybrook at Box, Wiltshire

Location
- Country: England
- Region: West Country
- District: South Gloucestershire

Physical characteristics
- Source: Lower Lapdown Farm
  - location: Tormarton, South Gloucestershire, England
  - coordinates: 51.4983°N 2.3429°W
  - elevation: 574 ft (175 m)
- 2nd source: Folly Farm, South Gloucestershire
  - location: Cold Ashton, South Gloucestershire, England
  - coordinates: 51.4565°N 2.3621°W
  - elevation: 623 ft (190 m)
- Source confluence: Nettleton Mill House
  - location: Castle Combe, Wiltshire, England
  - coordinates: 51.4985°N 2.2369°W
  - elevation: 262.5 ft (80.0 m)
- Mouth: Bristol Avon
  - location: Batheaston, Bath and North East Somerset, England
  - coordinates: 51.4016°N 2.3102°W
  - elevation: 66 ft (20 m)
- Length: 12 mi (19 km)
- Discharge
  - average: 57.25 cu ft/s (1.621 m^{3}/s)
  - minimum: 4.95 cu ft/s (0.140 m^{3}/s)
  - maximum: 487.6 cu ft/s (13.81 m^{3}/s)

Basin features
- River system: Bristol Avon

The Bybrook, also known as the By Brook, is a small river in England. It is a tributary of the Bristol Avon and is approximately 12 miles (19 km) long. Its sources are the Burton Brook and the Broadmead Brook, which rise in South Gloucestershire at Tormarton and Cold Ashton respectively, and join just north of Castle Combe in Wiltshire. The river has a mean flow rate of 57.25 cubic feet per second (1.621 m^{3}/s) as recorded at Middlehill near Box. The river supports a variety of flora and fauna including the endangered white-clawed crayfish. Twenty watermill sites have been identified on the river, but none remain in use today.

== Course ==
The Burton Brook rises near Lower Lapdown Farm at Tormarton and runs in an easterly direction towards the village of Burton on the Gloucestershire–Wiltshire border. The Broadmead Brook rises at Folly Farm at Cold Ashton and runs eastwards south of the Burton Brook; the two join below Gatcombe Hill, just north of the Wiltshire village of Castle Combe, at the beginning of a steep valley.

The Bybrook then flows south towards the village of Ford, where it first joins Lurescombe Brook, a tributary from North Wraxall, and then joins the Doncombe Brook, a tributary from Marshfield. Continuing through Slaughterford, the Bybrook is joined on the right bank by the Lid Brook at Drewett's Mill, north of Box; downstream of Weavern Farm, the Bybrook is locally referred to as the Weavern. The river now runs in a southwesterly direction through a shallower valley, past Shockerwick House, before joining the Bristol Avon at Bathford, adjacent to the Great Western Main Line and the A4 road.

== Geology ==
The geology of the Bybrook spans Middle Jurassic to Lower Jurassic rock types. The northern part of the catchment is dominated by the Great Oolite Limestone plateau. At source, the Burton Brook and Broadmead Brook tributaries cut through Forest Marble Clays. By Castle Combe, the brook has cut through the Greater Oolite Limestone to expose the underlying layer of Fuller's earth, before reaching the limestones of the Inferior Oolite Group and then Bridport Sand Formation and Charmouth Mudstone Formation of the Lias Group.

In recent geological history the Bybrook was the headwaters of the Avon. Drainage to the south, east, and north were previously headwaters of the River Thames. A major shift along a fault line captured these waters for the River Avon, including through major towns of Malmesbury and Chippenham. The increased water flow cut gorges through what are now Bristol and Bath, exposing deep springs including Bath's hot springs.

== Natural history ==
The Bybrook has significant populations of water crowfoot, native white-clawed crayfish and dippers. However, the crayfish are under threat from the invasive species American signal crayfish. Miller's thumbs and lampreys are also found in the river, alongside recolonising populations of otters and beavers. Notable bird species include grey wagtail, kingfisher and reed bunting. Just south of Slaughterford the river passes between two Sites of Special Scientific Interest at Colerne Park and Monk's Wood and Honeybrook Farm. These environments contain many rare meadow and aquatic plants including meadowsweet, common meadow-rue, hemlock water-dropwort, and golden-saxifrage.

== Hydrology ==
The Environment Agency measures flow rates in the Bybrook at Middlehill, near Box. The mean flow rate is 57.25 cubic feet per second (1.621 m^{3}/s). A peak flow of 487.6 cubic feet per second (13.81 m^{3}/s) was recorded on 2 January 2003 and a minimum flow of 4.95 cubic feet per second (0.140 m^{3}/s) on 18 September 1990. As of 2022, the Department for Environment, Food & Rural Affairs has classified the Bybrook as having moderate ecological status due to sewage discharge, livestock management and agricultural fertiliser usage.

== Mills ==
There is evidence of at least 20 mill sites along the Bybrook; many were seasonal and only operated when there was sufficient water. In Roman times, the mills were exclusively used for grinding corn, but by the end of the 12th century this part of Wiltshire had become an important centre for the wool trade. Mills were converted for the cleansing and thickening of wool, a process known as fulling.

Fulling mills were established by Sir John Fastolf in Castle Combe, along the Bybrook, in the thirteenth and fourteenth centuries, supporting a thriving woollen industry.

With the decline of the woollen industry in the 17th century, accelerated by the Civil War and plague, many mills returned to grain, and fulling operations finally ceased when steam power shifted cloth-making to northern England during the Industrial Revolution. The rise in demand for paper for packaging from nearby Bristol led to many mills converting to papermaking in the 18th and 19th centuries. Among them was Bathford Mill, just upstream of the confluence with the Avon, where papermaking began in 1809; paper for banknotes and passports is still made there by Portals.

Chapps Mill paper mill, which is associated with Slaughterford although it is in Colerne parish, continued in production until the 1990s.

=== Named mills ===
No.	Name	Details
1	Goulters Mill	Also known as Littleton Mill (1773), it was a corn mill mentioned in the Domesday Book.
2	Gatcombe Mill	Also known as Gadcombe Mill, it was of greater significance than Goulters Mill. It was known to be a corn mill in 1887 and continued in use until the 1920s.
3	Tanners Mill	Also known as Old Mill (1887), it dates back to at least 1773 and is now incorporated into the buildings of Lower Shirehill Farm.
4	West Kington Mill	In 1887 it was a corn mill that also housed a shoemaker and a butcher's shop.
5	Wick Mill	Also known as Longs or Langs Mill and Hennars Mill. It was derelict by 1887.
6	Nettleton Mill	Part of the Castle Combe estate. The buildings date from the 18th century.
7	Castle Combe Mill	The stepping stone weir and sluice are all that remain, in the gardens of the Manor House Hotel.
8	Upper Colham Mill	A barn on the old mill site is reported to have been a weaving shed.
9	Lower Colham Mill	Declined in importance with the demise of the wool trade.
10	Upper Long Dean Mill	Reported to have been a blanket mill prior to the First World War; it later operated as a flour and grist mill until closure in 1956.
11	Lower Long Dean Mill	Built as a paper mill by Bristol merchant Thomas Wilde (or Wyld) in 1635.
12	Ford Mill	In 1725 it was a fulling mill, gig mill and grist mill.
13	Doncombe Mill	Probably a fulling mill by 1704 before later converting to paper production and eventually a corn mill.
14	Rag Mill	Located in Slaughterford and also known as Overshot Mill.
15	Chapps Mill	Converted from fulling to paper production in the late 18th century and remained in operation until 1994.
16	Weavern Mill	Originally a fulling mill and later used for corn milling and papermaking.
17	Widdenham Mill	Produced brown, blue and sugar paper between 1817 and 1866.
18	Drewett's Mill	Was still operational as recently as 1990.
19	Box Mill	Later became Real World Studios, owned by musician Peter Gabriel.
20	Cuttings Mill	Lost during construction of the Great Western Railway.
21	Shockerwick Mills	Mentioned in medieval deeds, although little else is known of them.
22	Bathford Mill	A historic mill later used for papermaking by Portals.

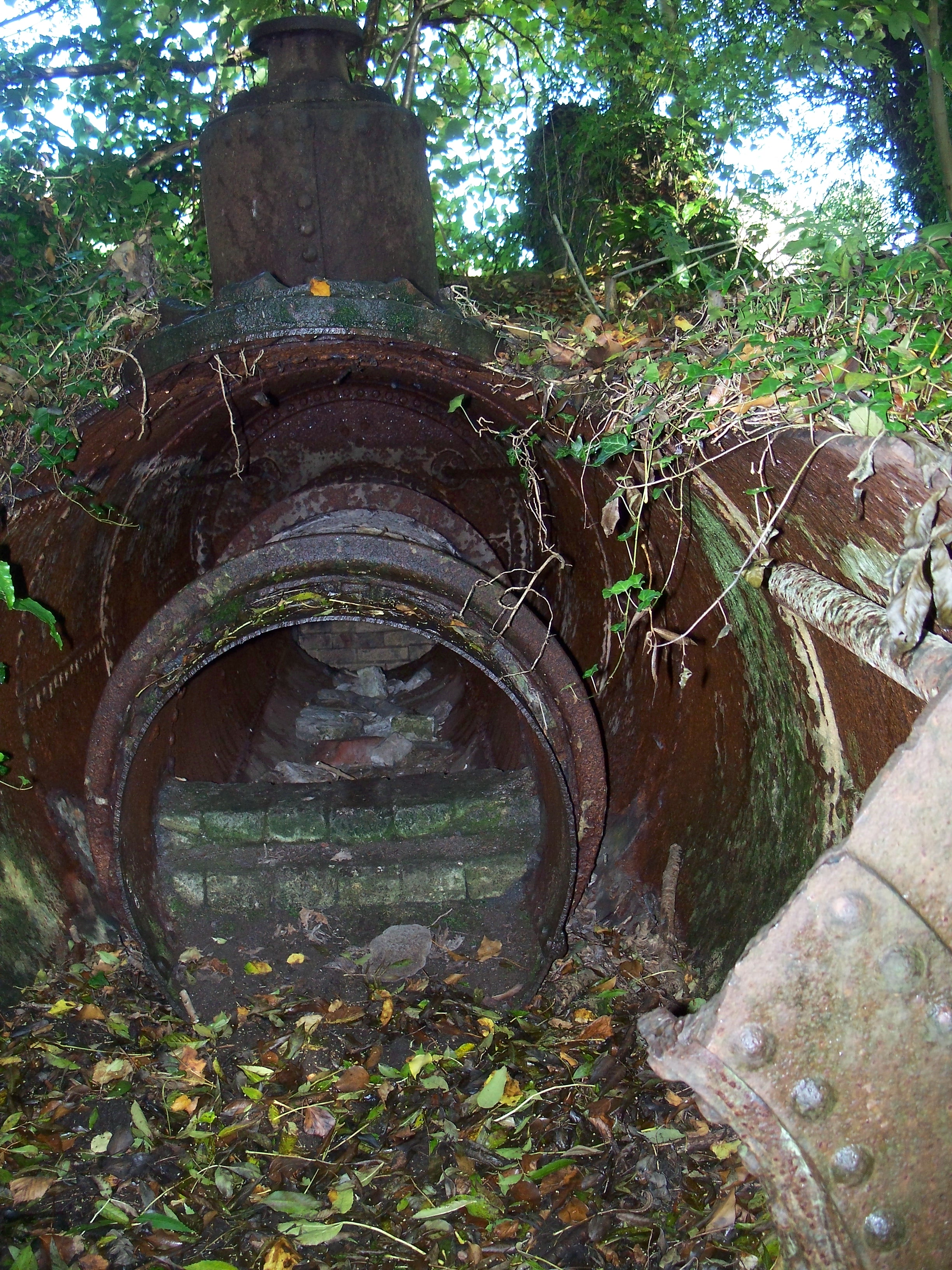
Although Rag Mill was demolished in 1964, some equipment remained in place in 2009

== Bybrook team ministry ==
The Bybrook team ministry is a grouping of Church of England parishes in the district.
