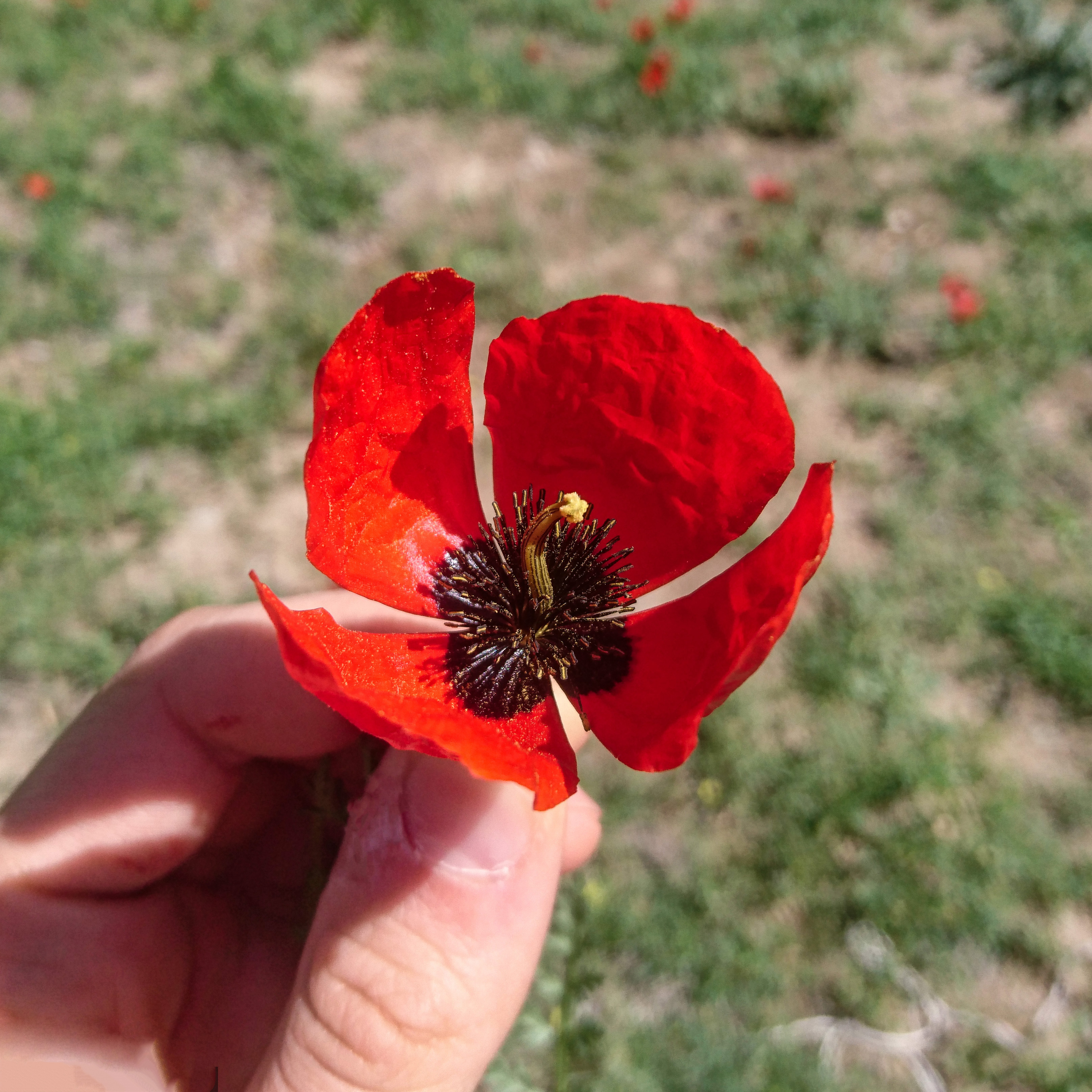

Scientific classification
- Kingdom: Plantae
- Clade: Tracheophytes
- Clade: Angiosperms
- Clade: Eudicots
- Order: Ranunculales
- Family: Papaveraceae
- Genus: Roemeria
- Species: R. refracta

Binomial name
- Roemeria refracta DC

= Roemeria refracta =

Species of plant

Roemeria refracta, the spotted Asia-poppy, is an annual, hairy herbaceous plant of the genus Roemeria and the family Papaveraceae. The plant is 4 to 50 cm tall. The petals are red with a black spot at the base. Sometimes there is a white border around the black spot. Also, in a variety of this plant (Roemeria refracta var. alba), the petals are white. The fruit is a narrow, dehiscent capsule 2 to 8 cm long. Geographical distribution: Turkey, Iran, Caucasus, Transcaucasus, Turkmenistan, Afghanistan and Pakistan.

== Alkaloids ==
Isopavine alkaloids reframine, reframidine and reframoline are present in Roemeria refracta.

== Gallery ==
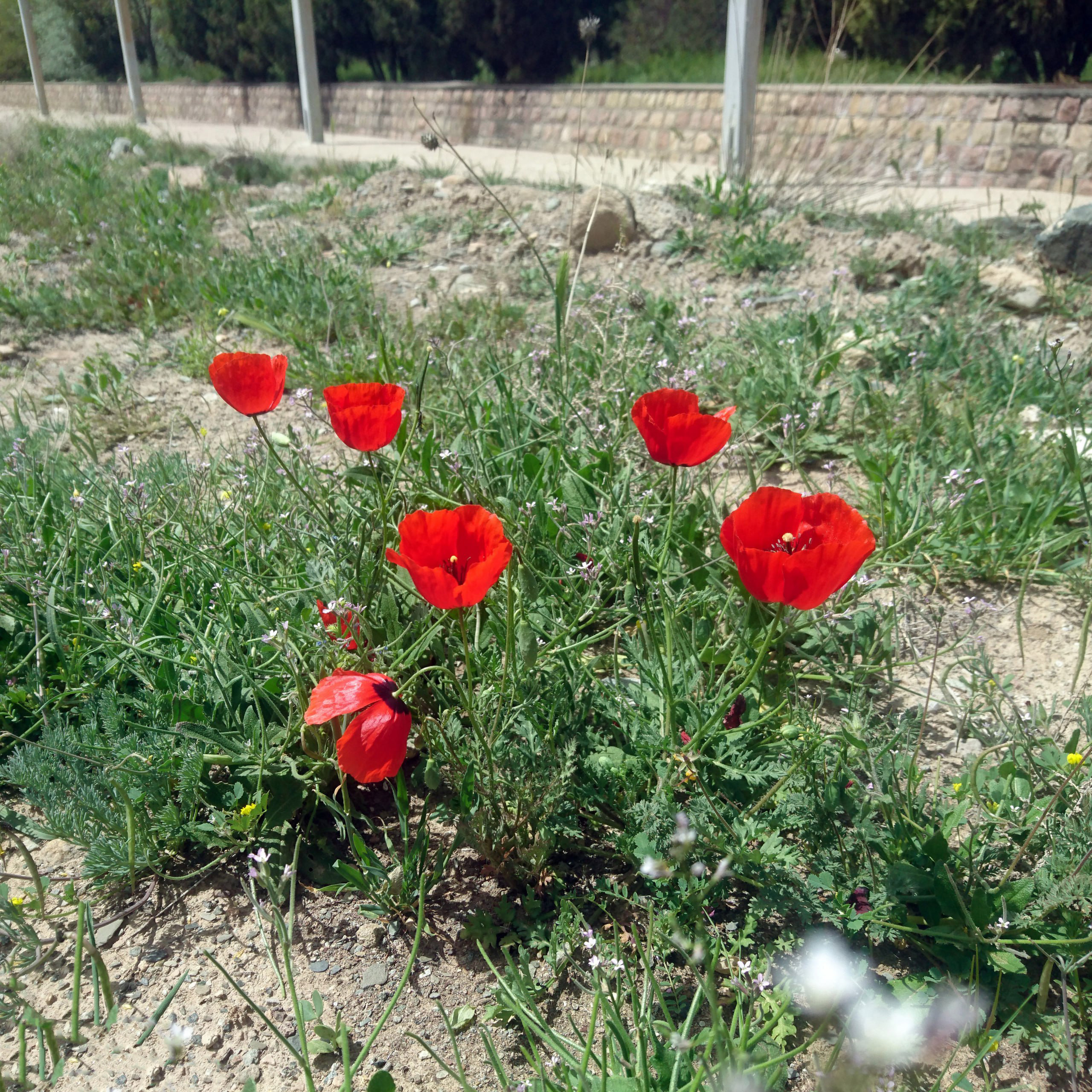

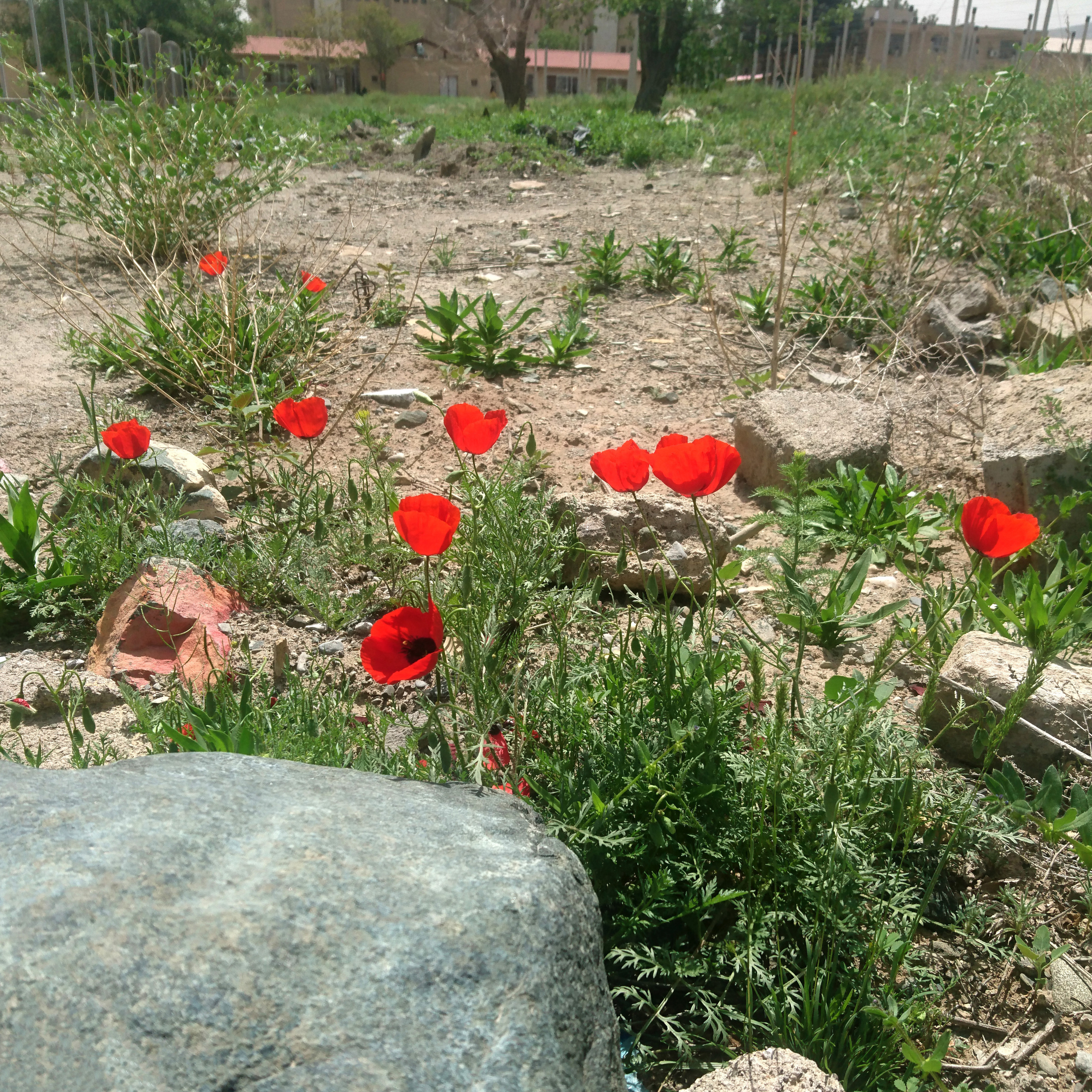

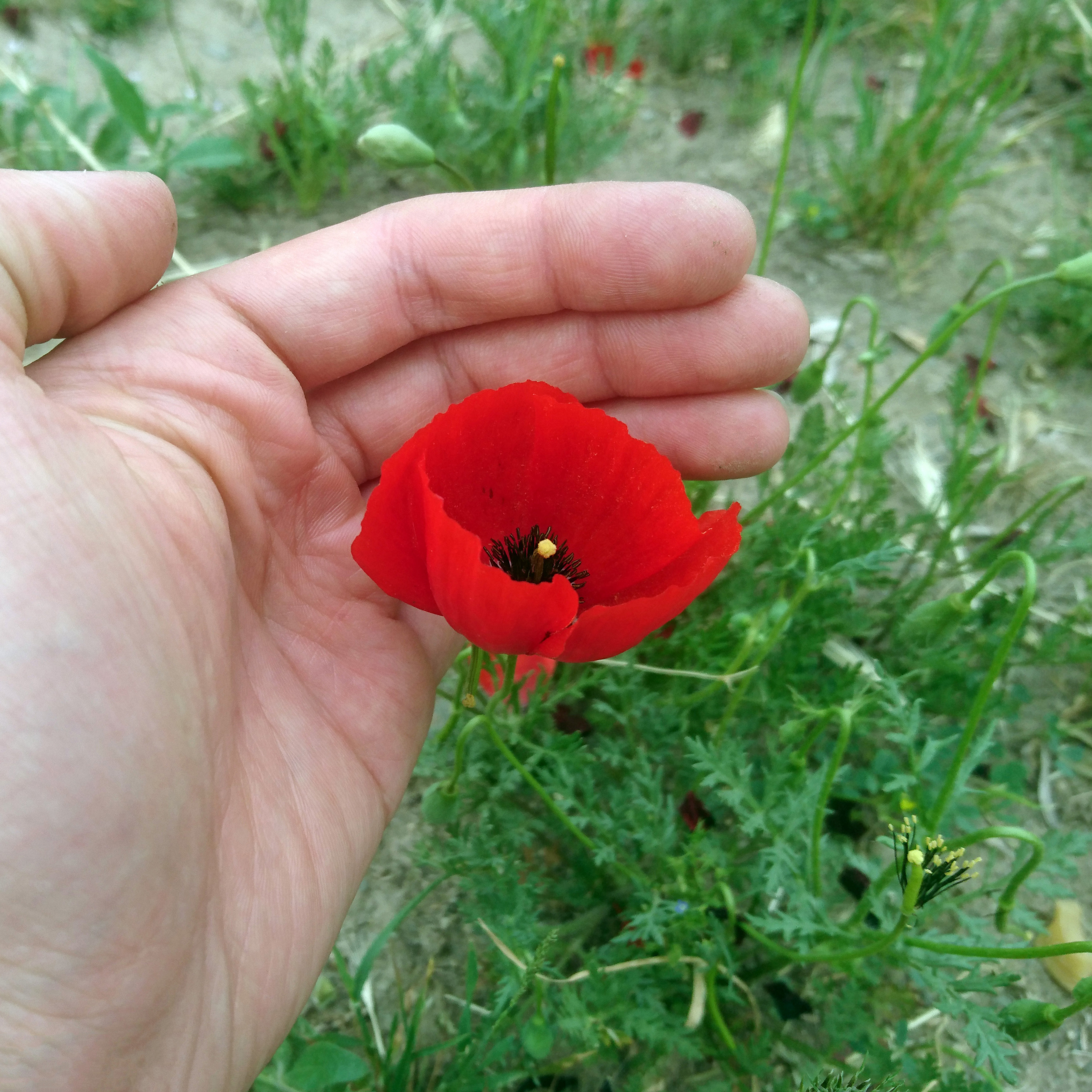

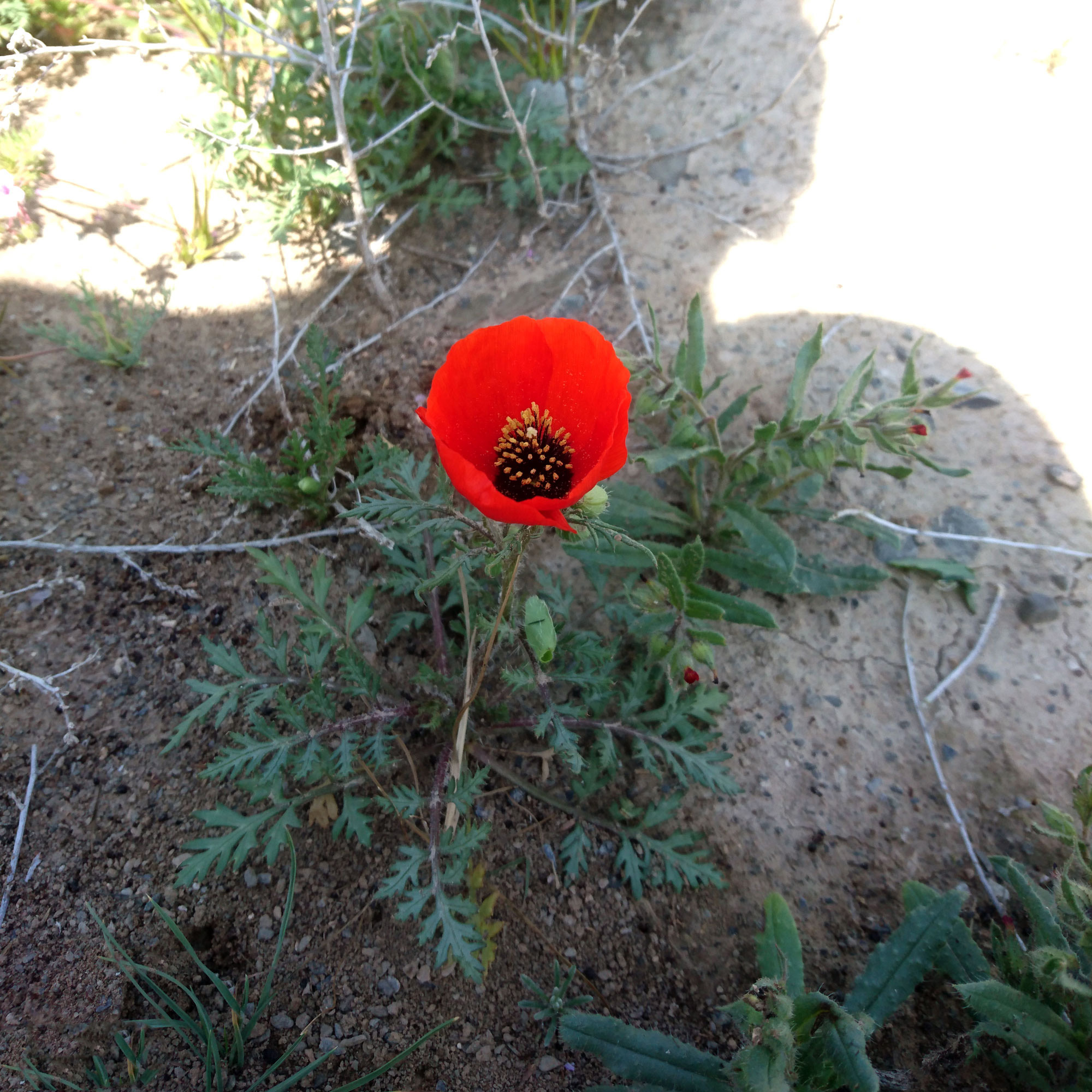

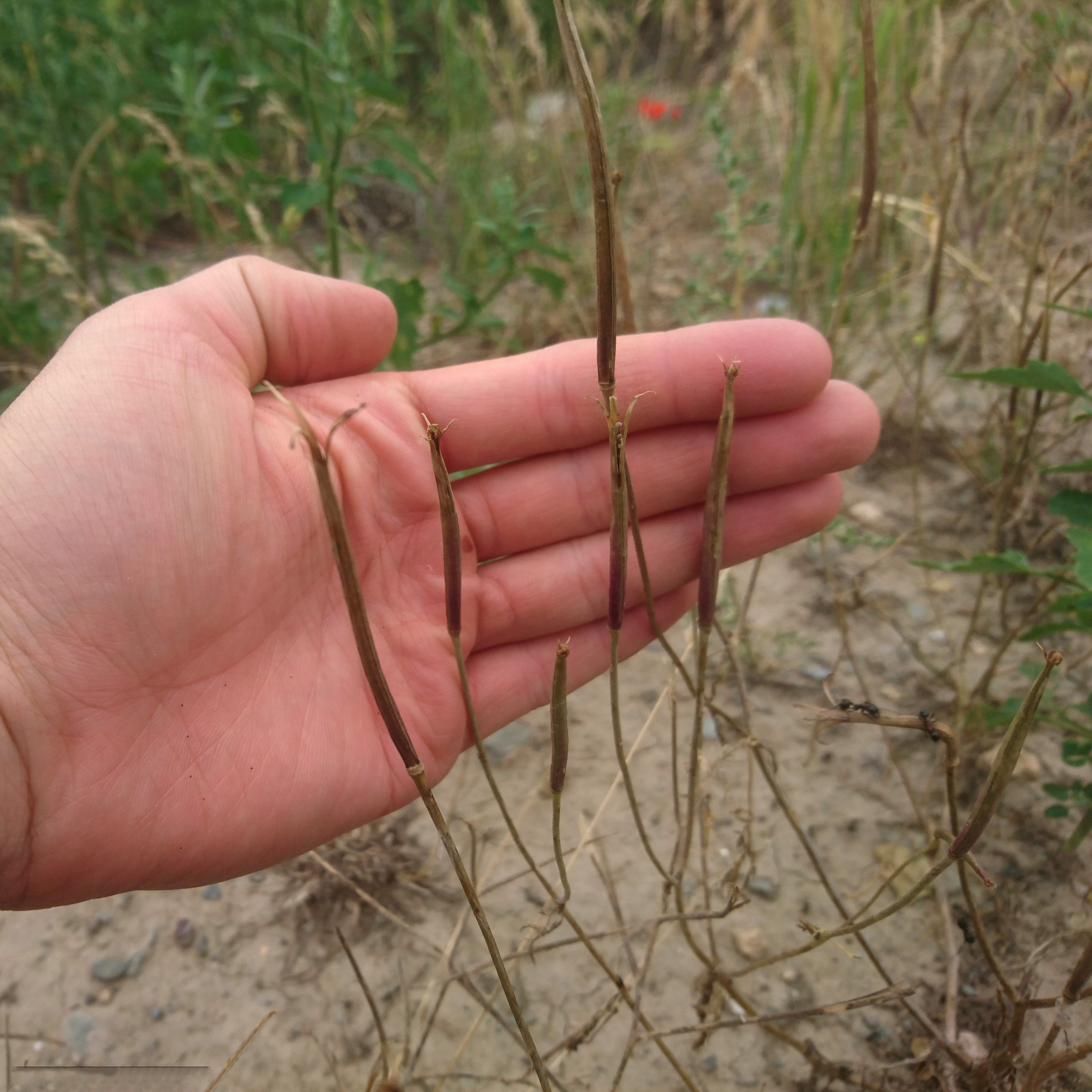

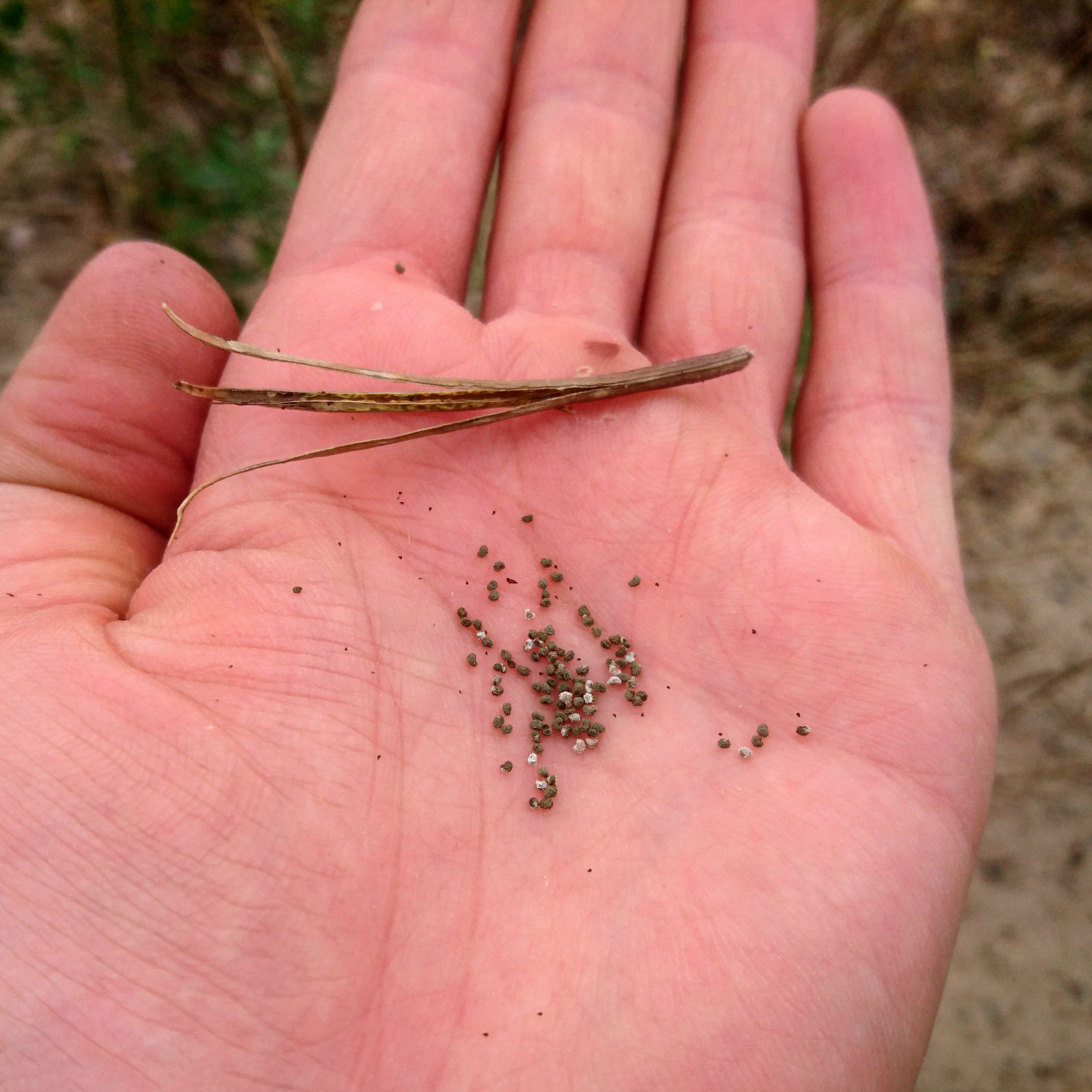

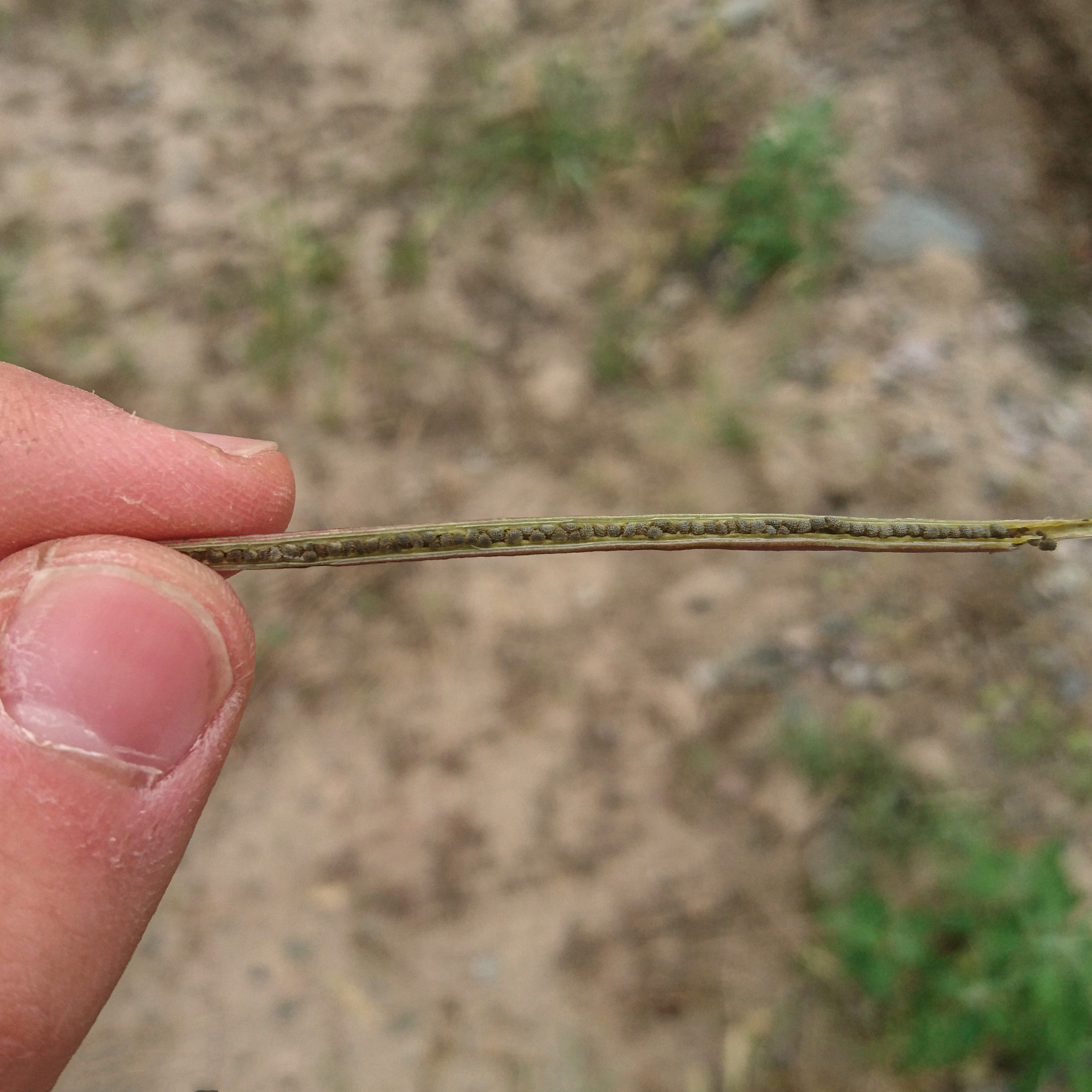
