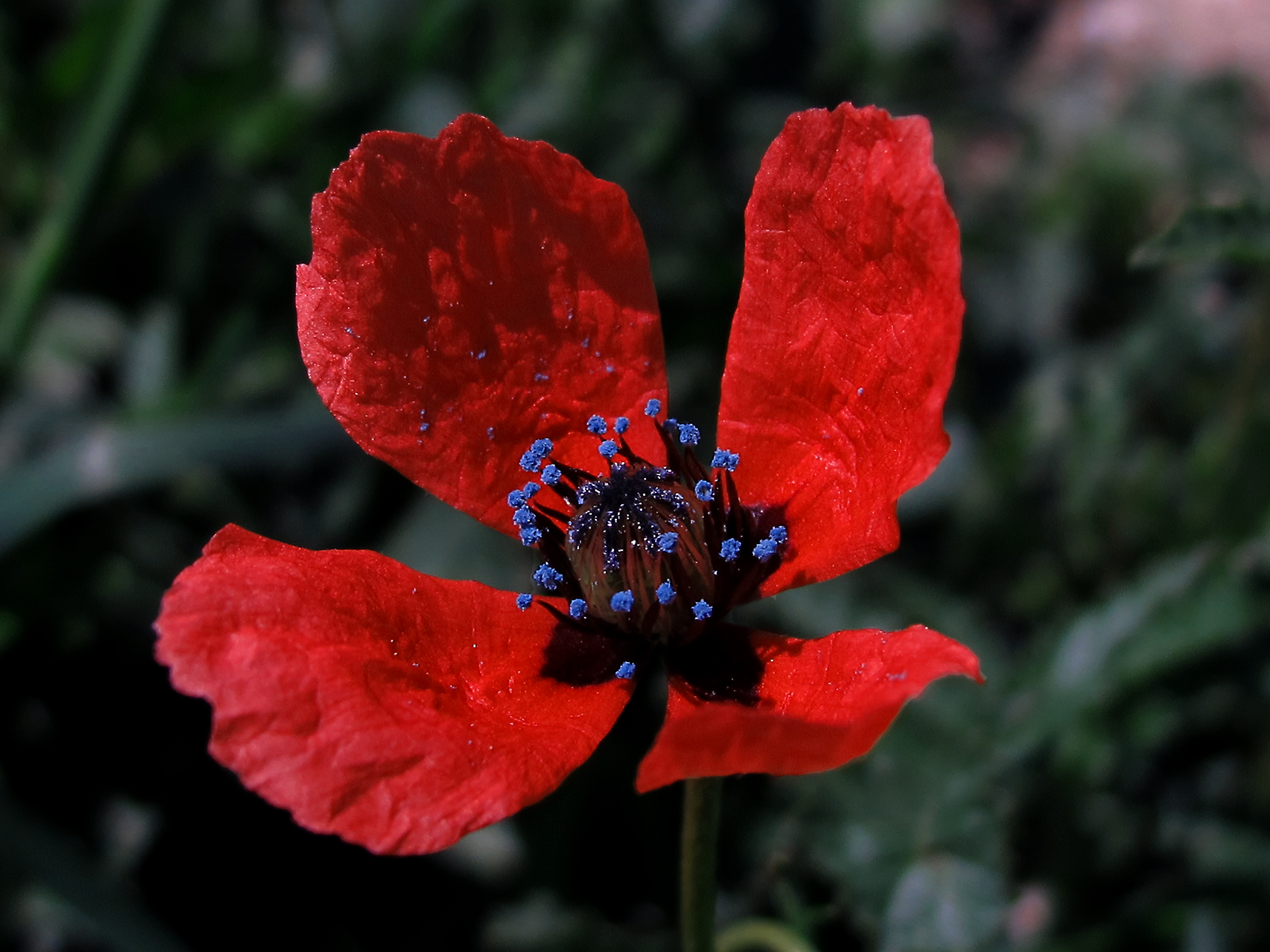
- Flower
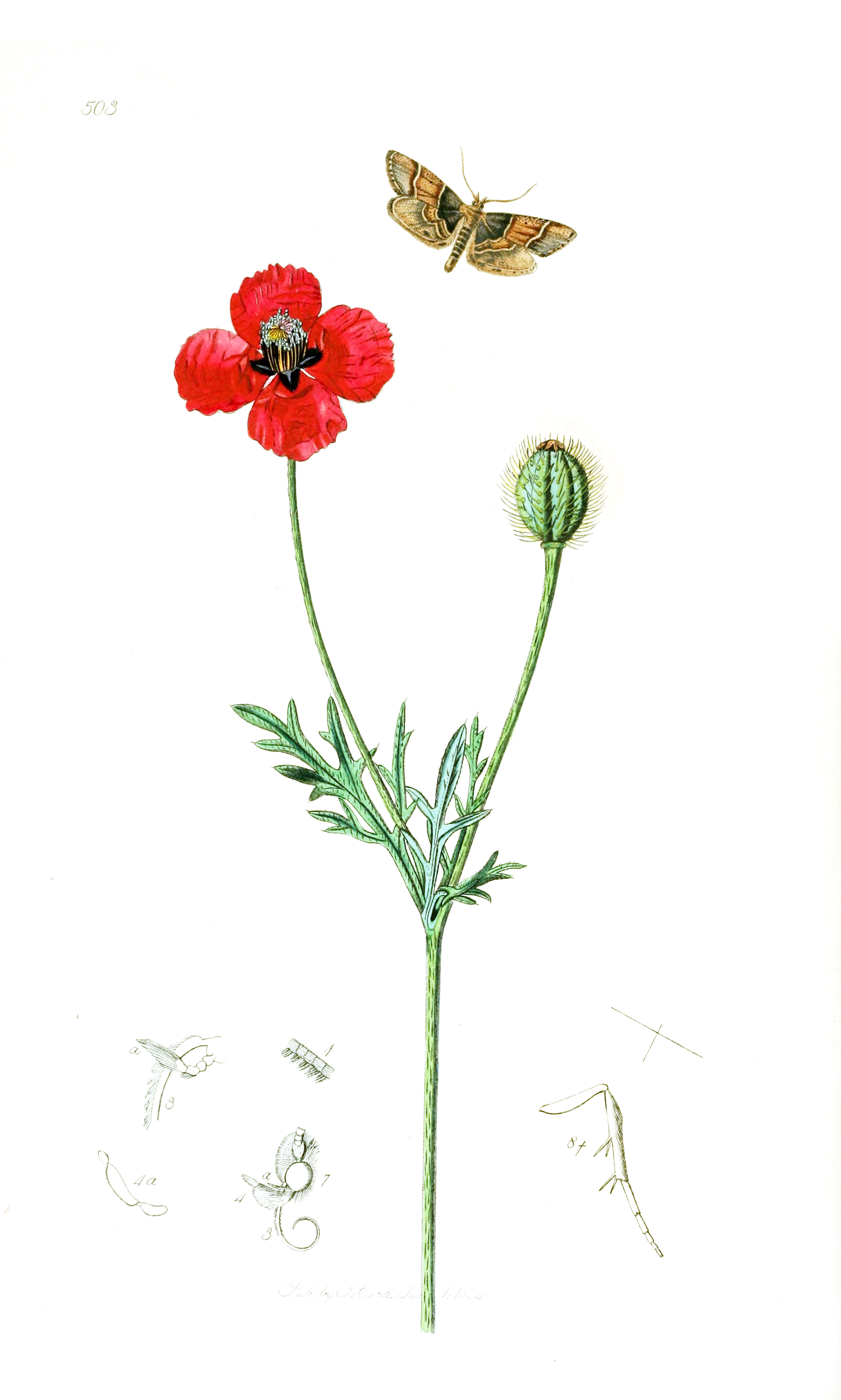
- Botanical illustration

Scientific classification
- Kingdom: Plantae
- Clade: Tracheophytes
- Clade: Angiosperms
- Clade: Eudicots
- Order: Ranunculales
- Family: Papaveraceae
- Genus: Roemeria
- Species: R. sicula

Binomial name
- Roemeria sicula (Guss.) Galasso, Banfi, L.Sáez & Bartolucci

Synonyms
- List: Papaver argemone f. siculum; Papaver hybridum; Papaver hybridum subsp. siculum; Papaver hybridum var. siculum; Papaver siculum

= Roemeria sicula =

Plant species in the poppy family

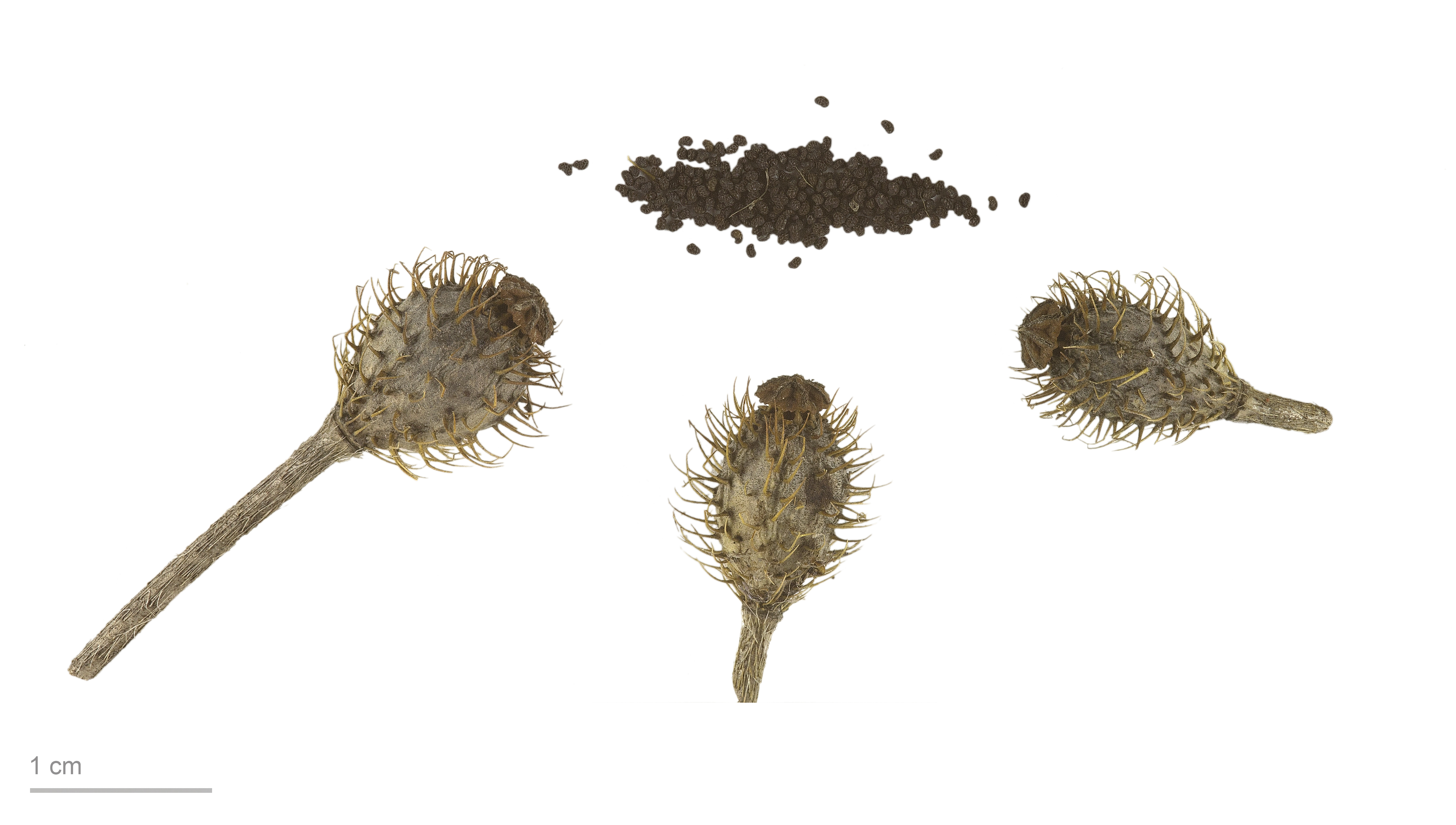
Papaver hybridum

Roemeria sicula, the rough poppy or round pricklyhead poppy, is a widespread species of flowering plant in the poppy family. It is native to the Mediterranean region, and western Asia as far as the western Himalayas, and has been introduced to much of the rest of Europe, South Africa, all of Australia, some US states, Chile and Argentina. It is a minor weed of cereal crops, and its range is expected to greatly expand due to climate change.

== Taxonomy ==
In 1753 Carl Linnaeus named a species Papaver hybridum, but though not identical to Roemeria sicula, it is regarded as one of its synonyms. The first description identical to the present species was published by the botanist Giovanni Gussone in 1844 with the name Papaver siculum. However, it was regarded as a subspecies or variety of Papaver hybridum by some botanists as late as 2007. More recently it has been moved to the genus Roemeria by Gabriele Galasso, Enrico Augusto Banfi, Llorenç Sáez, and Fabrizio Bartolucci. Though Roemeria sicula is listed as the accepted name in Plants of the World Online and World Plants, it is very frequently listed as Papaver hybridum by sources such as the USDA Natural Resources Conservation Service, the Flora of North America, and the Flora of Australia.

Following the species concept in POWO, it has 17 synonyms.

Table of synonyms
| Name | Year | Rank | Notes |
|---|---|---|---|
| Cerastites hybridus (L.) Gray | 1821 | species | = het. |
| Papaver apulum var. gracillimum Fedde | 1909 | variety | = het. |
| Papaver argemone var. hybridum (L.) Kuntze | 1887 | variety | = het. |
| Papaver argemone f. siculum (Guss.) Kuntze | 1887 | form | ≡ hom. |
| Papaver heterotricum Lojac. ex Tornab. | 1887 | species | = het. |
| Papaver hispidum Lam. | 1779 | species | = het., nom. superfl. |
| Papaver hispidum var. ambiguum Rouy & Foucaud | 1893 | variety | = het. |
| Papaver hybridum L. | 1753 | species | = het. |
| Papaver hybridum var. dissectum Rouy & Foucaud | 1893 | variety | = het. |
| Papaver hybridum var. lanuginosum Fedde | 1909 | variety | = het. |
| Papaver hybridum f. latifolium Maire & Weiller | 1939 | form | = het. |
| Papaver hybridum var. pinnatifidum Rouy & Foucaud | 1893 | variety | = het. |
| Papaver hybridum subsp. siculum (Guss.) Arcang. | 1882 | subspecies | ≡ hom. |
| Papaver hybridum var. siculum (Guss.) Raimondo & Spadaro | 2007 | variety | ≡ hom. |
| Papaver hybridum var. tenuifolium L.Chevall. | 1903 | variety | = het. |
| Papaver siculum Guss. | 1844 | species | ≡ hom. |
| Roemeria hispida Stace | 2017 | species | = het. |
Notes: ≡ homotypic synonym ; = heterotypic synonym
