= Nettleton Mill =

Mill house in Wiltshire, England

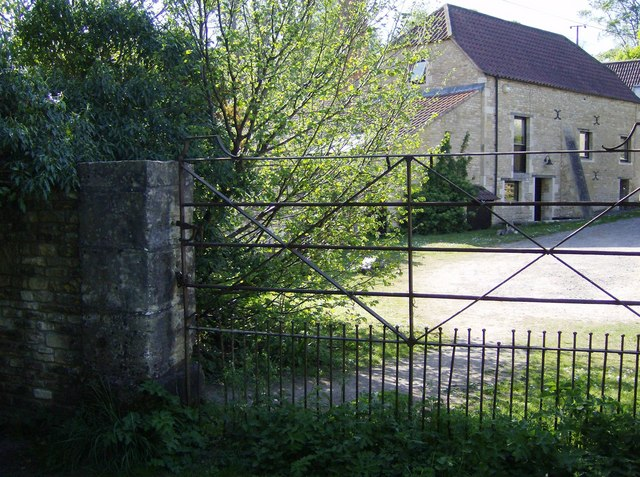
- View of the Nettleton Mill through a closed gate

- Location within Wiltshire

General information
- Location: Near Nettleton, Wiltshire, United Kingdom
- Coordinates: 51.4965°N 2.2413°W
- Completed: 1774

Technical details
- Structural system: Stone

Nettleton Mill is a mill house in Wiltshire, England, on the banks of the Bybrook River, to the south-east of Nettleton. Part of the Castle Combe estate, it was built in 1774 as a farmhouse; this date is inscribed on the outer building. The old ruined farmhouse was refurbished in the early 1990s and has been converted into a bed and breakfast cottage.

== Geography ==
The building is in a Cotswolds valley, between Nettleton and Castle Combe, in a village setting, about 13 miles (21 km) north of Bath. The bridge at Fosse Way over Broadmead Brook is nearby, where signal and native crayfish have been recorded by use of traps. It is surrounded by wooded forest land of about 2.5 hectares (6.2 acres). The stream that flows through the property is known for trout fishing.

== History ==
Milling operations at the Nettleton Mill were discontinued sometime before World War I. In the 1950s and 1960s, the turbine power was utilised, probably when the stream flow became inadequate. Between 1984 and 1986, the site was a shooting location for the 1980s cult series Robin of Sherwood.

The farmhouse was vacated by Connolly Leather Ltd in 1991. In 2010, the property was offered for sale at £1.15 million. It is now run as a country retreat.

== Features ==
The structure is built of local stone. The undershot wheel of the grist mill was replaced by a turbine during the 19th century. The sheds in the annex of the farmhouse were used for storage of farm products. The layout of the building at ground-floor level consists of a large, high-vaulted drawing room. A conservatory passage leads to the kitchen and dining space. On the next floor, accessed by a flight of steps, there is a hall with galleries and living accommodation with two bathrooms. There is also a wine cellar. The structure is roofed with pantiles.
