= Bathford =

Village in Somerset, England

Coordinates: 51.401°N 2.302°W

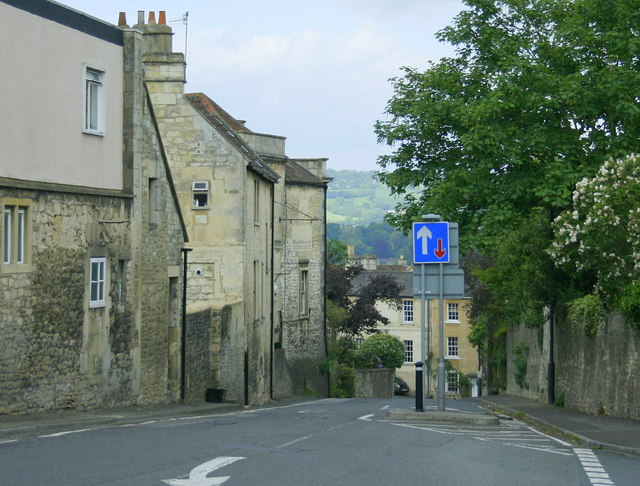
- High Street

- Location within Somerset
- Population: 1,759
- OS grid reference: ST791669
- Unitary authority: Bath and North East Somerset
- Ceremonial county: Somerset
- Region: South West
- Country: England
- Sovereign state: United Kingdom
- Post town: BATH
- Postcode district: BA1
- Dialling code: 01225
- Police: Avon and Somerset
- Fire: Avon
- Ambulance: South Western
- UK Parliament: Bath

Bathford (pronounced with the emphasis on the second syllable) is a village and civil parish 3 miles (4.8 km) east of Bath, England. The parish, which includes Warleigh, has a population of 1,759 and extends over 1,800 acres (7.3 km^{2}).

== History ==
The ancient charter Codex Diplomaticus Aevi Saxonici describes a manor parish consisting of three tithings or quasi manors: Bathford in the centre, Shockerwick to the north, and Warleigh to the south. This corresponds closely to the current boundaries. This manor was known as Forde up until the seventeenth century; the name was derived from the ford that crosses the By Brook, connecting Bathford to neighbouring Batheaston.

Near the river crossing is the site of a Roman villa, the hypocaust of which was found about the middle of the seventeenth century. This villa is described in John Aubrey's Monumenta Britannica:

At Bathford (near the citie of Bathe) was found by digging of a drayning trench deeper than ordinarily in the grounds of Mr Skreene, in the year 1655 a roome underground, which was about 14-foot (4.3 m) one way and 17 feet (5.2 m) the other. The pavement of which was opus tesselatum [tesselated work] of small stones of several colours. viz., white (hard chalk), blue (liasse), and red (fine brick). In the middle of the floor was a blue bird, not well proportioned, and in each of the four angles a sort of knott. This ground and the whole manor did belong to the Abbey of Bath. Underneath this floor there is water. The floor is borne on pillars of stone about an ell distant the one from the other. On the pillars were laid plank stones on which the opus tesselatum was layd. The water issued out of the earth a little below, and many persuade themselves there is much water in it. This discovered place was so much frequented that it caused Mr Skreene to cover it up again, because the great concourse of people, especially from Bathe, injured his grounds, but he would not cover it so soon that the people had torn up all the work before I came hither to see it, but his daughter-in-lawe hath described the whole floor with her needle in gobelin-stitch. Mr Skreene told me there is another floor adjoining yet untouched.

The ford from which the village derived its name was connected with the Fosse Way. This is mentioned in a Saxon charter of the tenth century relating to the manor. The Fosse Way stills forms the boundary of the parish.

Bathford was part of the hundred of Bath Forum.

The old Bathford railway bridge was built by Isambard Kingdom Brunel as part of the Great Western Railway. A station called Bathford Halt closed in 1965.

Near Bathford, on the opposite side of the river, is a large meadow known as Horselands where, according to tradition, the Roman cavalry were exercised. More recently, the area bounded by Ostlings Lane and the Bradford Road (A363) was used to keep the spare horses used to haul the mail coaches up Bathford Hill. They then returned to the field to await the next coach. Some older long-standing residents of Bathford still refer to Ostlings Lane as Horses Lane. Whether the two areas are related is somewhat uncertain.

Bathford has been formally twinned with Artannes-sur-Indre in France since 2005.

== Governance ==
The parish council has responsibility for local issues, including setting an annual precept (local rate) to cover the council's operating costs and producing annual accounts for public scrutiny. The parish council evaluates local planning applications and works with the local police, district council officers, and neighbourhood watch groups on matters of crime, security, and traffic. The parish council's role also includes initiating projects for the maintenance and repair of parish facilities, such as the village hall or community centre, playing fields and playgrounds, as well as consulting with the district council on the maintenance, repair, and improvement of highways, drainage, footpaths, public transport, and street cleaning. Conservation matters (including trees and listed buildings) and environmental issues are also of interest to the council.

The parish falls within the unitary authority of Bath and North East Somerset which was created in 1996, as established by the Local Government Act 1992. It provides a single tier of local government with responsibility for almost all local government functions within its area including local planning and building control, local roads, council housing, environmental health, markets and fairs, refuse collection, recycling, cemeteries, crematoria, leisure services, parks, and tourism. It is also responsible for education, social services, libraries, main roads, public transport, trading standards, waste disposal and strategic planning, although fire, police and ambulance services are provided jointly with other authorities through the Avon Fire and Rescue Service, Avon and Somerset Constabulary and the Great Western Ambulance Service.

Bath and North East Somerset's area covers part of the ceremonial county of Somerset but it is administered independently of the non-metropolitan county. Its administrative headquarters is in Bath. Between 1 April 1974 and 1 April 1996, it was the Wansdyke district and the City of Bath of the county of Avon. Before 1974 that the parish was part of the Bathavon Rural District.

The parish is represented in the House of Commons of the Parliament of the United Kingdom as part of the Bath constituency. It elects one Member of Parliament (MP) by the first past the post system of election. It was also part of the South West England constituency of the European Parliament prior to Britain leaving the European Union in January 2020, which elected seven MEPs using the d'Hondt method of party-list proportional representation.

== Geography ==
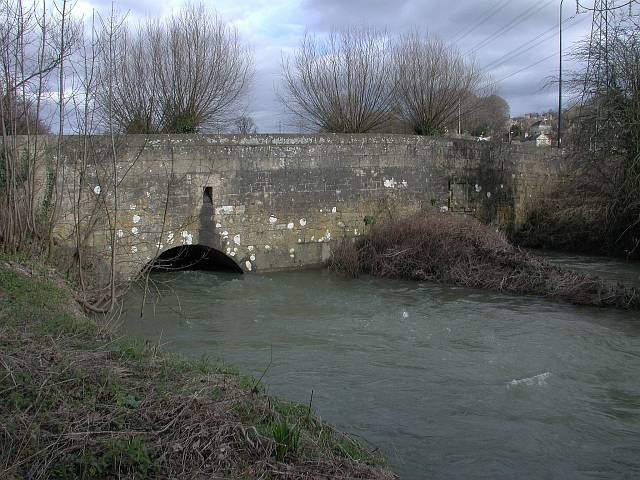
Bathford Bridge

The old walled village of Bathford is on the A363, approximately one kilometre south of the A4. Bathford Bridge is where the A363 crosses the By Brook (also known as Box Brook, The Weaver and Withy Brook). The original bridge was built in the 13th or 14th century to replace the ford which gave the village its name.

Bathford extends up one side of the Avonvale Valley. There are several routes up to the valley ridge, which was once the site of active stone quarrying. This ridge offers commanding views of the valley below and also of nearby Solsbury Hill.

== Industry ==
A mill was recorded in the Domesday survey of 1086. A mill on the By Brook, just north of the village and upstream of Bathford Bridge, was used at various times to grind corn and make cloth and leather. Papermaking began there in 1809. The site was acquired in 1972 by the Hampshire-based Portals company, which was part of De La Rue between 1995 and 2018. Today the mill is owned by Portals International Limited, established when De La Rue divested their papermaking business; the company specialises in paper for banknotes and other security applications such as passports.

== Landmarks ==
Shockerwick House was built as a country house around 1750 by John Wood the Elder and is now offices and a nursing home. It has been designated as a Grade I listed building.

== Religious sites ==
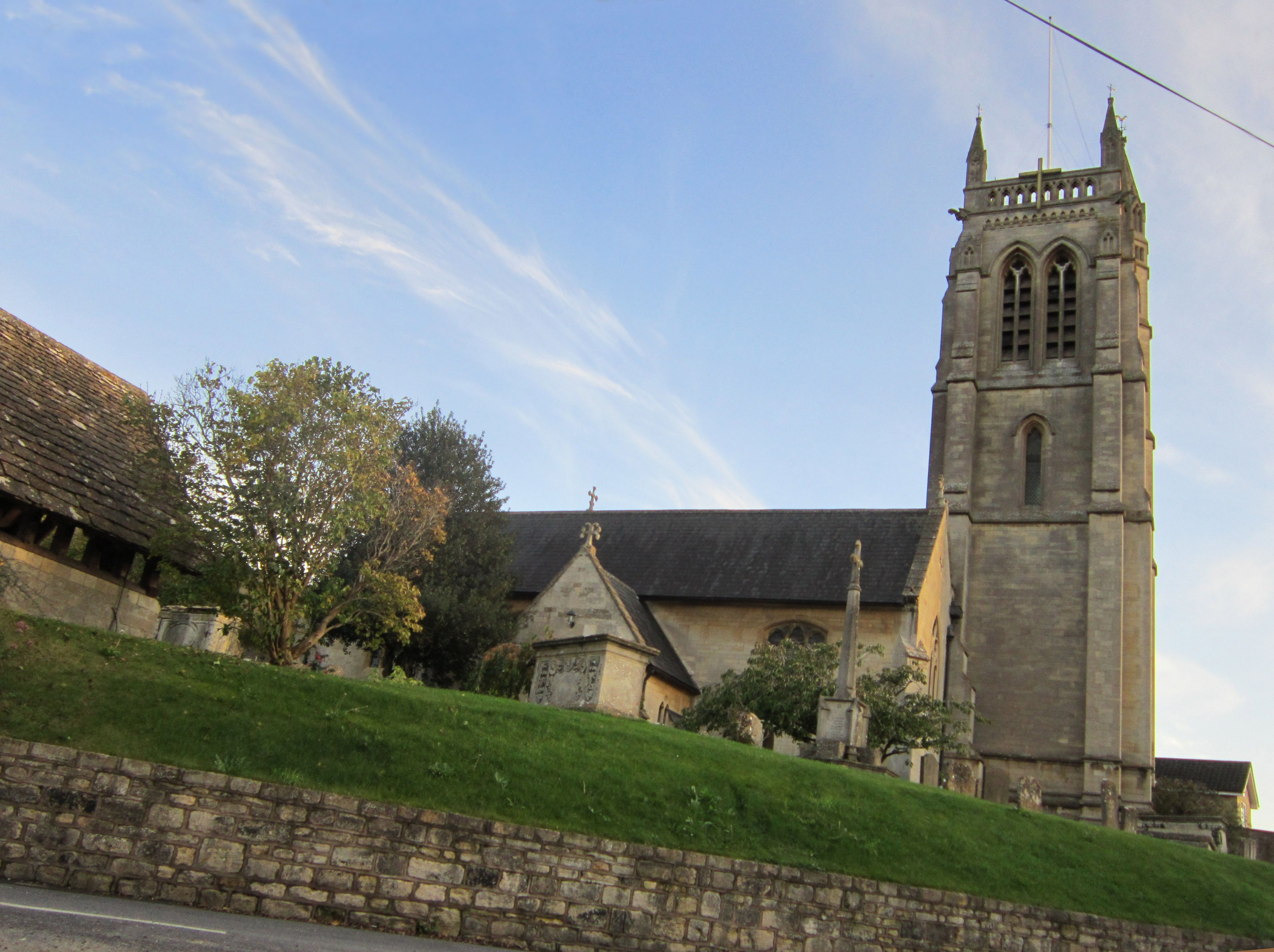
St Swithun's Church

St Swithun's Church, parts of which may date from the 12th century, is the resting place of Admiral Lord Nelson's sister, Ann. The church has Romanesque origins and the dedication to St. Swithun is thought to have been in 1323. The north aisle and porch were added in 1856, the south aisle and nave in 1870–72, and the west tower between 1879 and 1880.

== Events ==
There is a flower show every September which is usually hosted in the village hall but, in 2022, was hosted in the school hall. Due to COVID-19 the flower show was unable to be hosted as usual. In 2020, nothing happened. In 2021, people put up tables with fruits, vegetables, flowers, etc... in their gardens for people to see.

== Education ==
There is a school in Bathford called Bathford Primary School (formerly known as Bathford CofE VC School).

== Notable residents ==
- Danny Kustow (1955–2019), pop musician, guitarist with the Tom Robinson Band.
- Manny Elias (born 1953), rock musician, drummer for Tears for Fears from 1981 to 1986.
