= Colerne Park and Monk's Wood =

Protected area in Wiltshire, England

Coordinates: 51.45125°N 2.23452°W

Colerne Park and Monk's Wood (grid reference ST838725) is a 53.7 hectare biological Site of Special Scientific Interest in Wiltshire, England, notified in 1951.

The site is north-east of Colerne village, and its eastern part is in the floodplain of the small Bybrook River. The woodland includes ash and wych-elm, and has rare plants, some of them wet-loving.

== Sources ==
- Natural England citation sheet for the site (accessed 24 March 2022)
