= Isopavine =

Names
- Systematic IUPAC name 10,11-Dihydro-2,3,7,8-tetramethoxy-10,5-iminomethano-5H-dibenzo[a,d]cycloheptene

Identifiers
| CAS Number | 25727-46-2 |
| 3D model (JSmol) | Interactive image |
| ChemSpider | 348035 |
| PubChem CID | 392702 |
| CompTox Dashboard (EPA) | DTXSID601046114 |
- InChI: InChI=1S/C20H23NO4/c1-22-17-6-11-5-16-14-9-20(25-4)19(24-3)8-13(14)15(10-21-16)12(11)7-18(17)23-2/h6-9,15-16,21H,5,10H2,1-4H3 Key: ZNIIISXAGSAJQE-UHFFFAOYSA-N
- SMILES: COC1=C(C=C2C3CNC(CC2=C1)C4=CC(=C(C=C34)OC)OC)OC

Properties
| Chemical formula | C_{20}H_{23}NO_{4} |
| Molar mass | 341.407 g·mol^{−1} |
- Except where otherwise noted, data are given for materials in their standard state (at 25 °C [77 °F], 100 kPa). Infobox references

Isopavine is an alkaloid.

== Examples ==
Reframine

Examples of isopavine alkaloids include the following: reframine, reframidine and reframoline (Caryachine). These are all present in Roemeria refracta.

== See also ==
- Pavine, a related alkaloid
