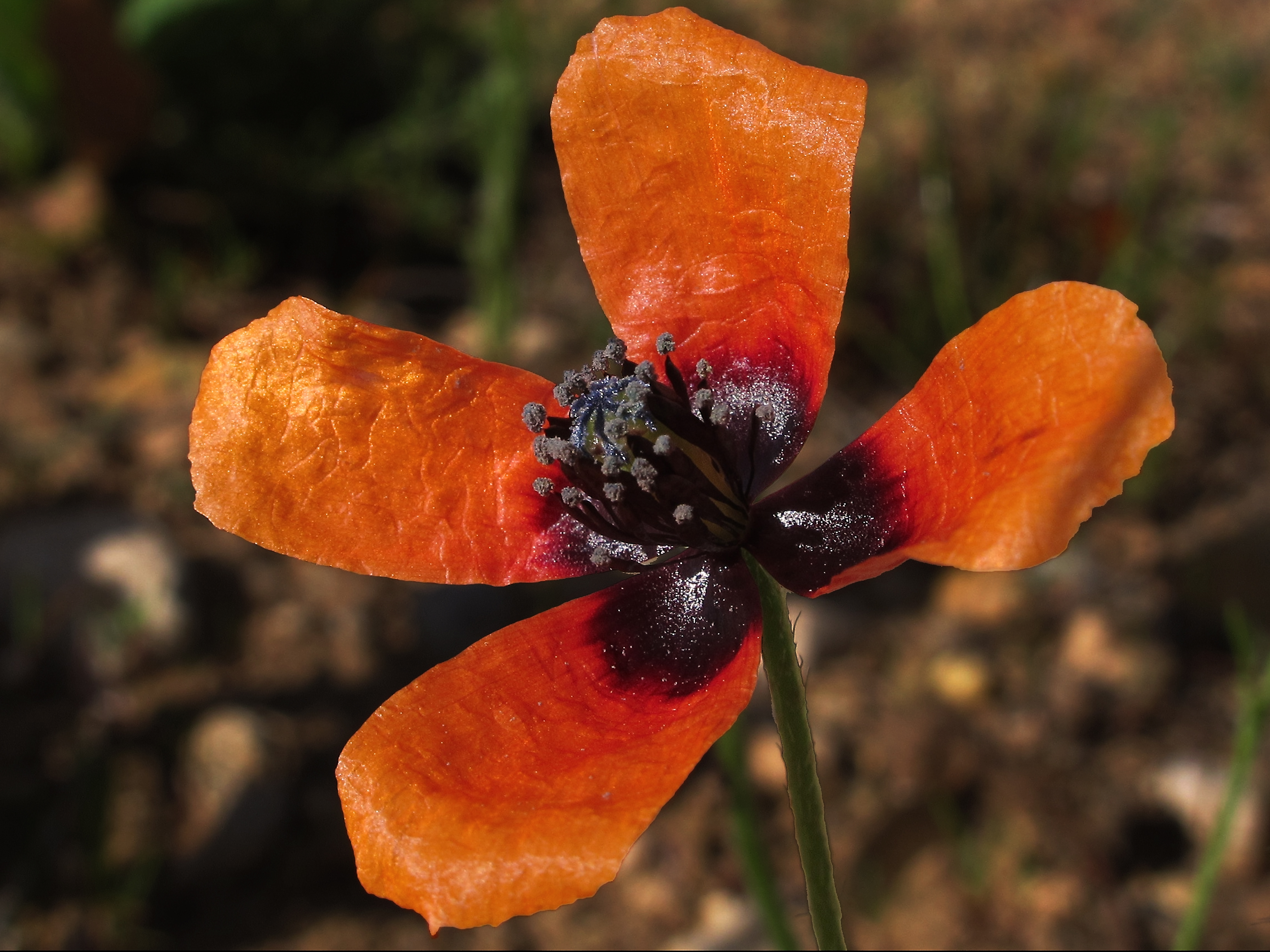

Scientific classification
- Kingdom: Plantae
- Clade: Tracheophytes
- Clade: Angiosperms
- Clade: Eudicots
- Order: Ranunculales
- Family: Papaveraceae
- Genus: Roemeria
- Species: R. argemone

Binomial name
- Roemeria argemone L. C.Morales, R.Mend. & Romero García

Synonyms
- Cerastites macrocephalus Gray; Papaver argemone L.; Papaver argemone f. glabrum (W.D.J.Koch) O.Bolòs & Vigo; Papaver argemone f. littoralis Corill., Figureau & Godeau; Papaver argemone var. minus Latourr.; Papaver argemone var. plenum Latourr.; Papaver argemonium St.-Lag.; Papaver arvense Borkh.; Papaver clavatum Gilib.; Papaver clavigerum Lam.; Papaver maritimum With.; Papaver micranthum Boreau; Papaver neglectum Fedde

= Roemeria argemone =

Species of flowering plant in the poppy family

Roemeria argemone (syn. Papaver argemone) is a species of flowering plant in the poppy family Papaveraceae. Its common names include long pricklyhead poppy, prickly poppy and pale poppy. Its native range includes parts of Eurasia and North Africa, but it can be found growing wild in parts of North America, where it is an introduced species. It is cultivated as an ornamental plant.

== Description ==
This annual plant grows up to 50 cm (20 in), Its 15–50 cm (6–20 in) long, branching stems are coated in stiff prickly hairs. The fern-like green, leaves at the base of the plant have stalks, but upper leaves are stalk-less. They can be up to 20 cm (8 in) long, It blooms in spring to summer, between May and July. The flowers have four slightly overlapping red petals, each with a dark base. They can measure 2–5.5 cm (0.8–2.2 in) across, with pale blue anthers and 4-6 stigmas. Later, the plant produces a seed capsule, oblong to clavate (shaped like a club) with ribs and up to 2 cm long.

=== Biochemistry ===
The plant contains alkaloids and has been used in herbal medicines. It also means the plant is not eaten much by grazing animals.

== Taxonomy ==
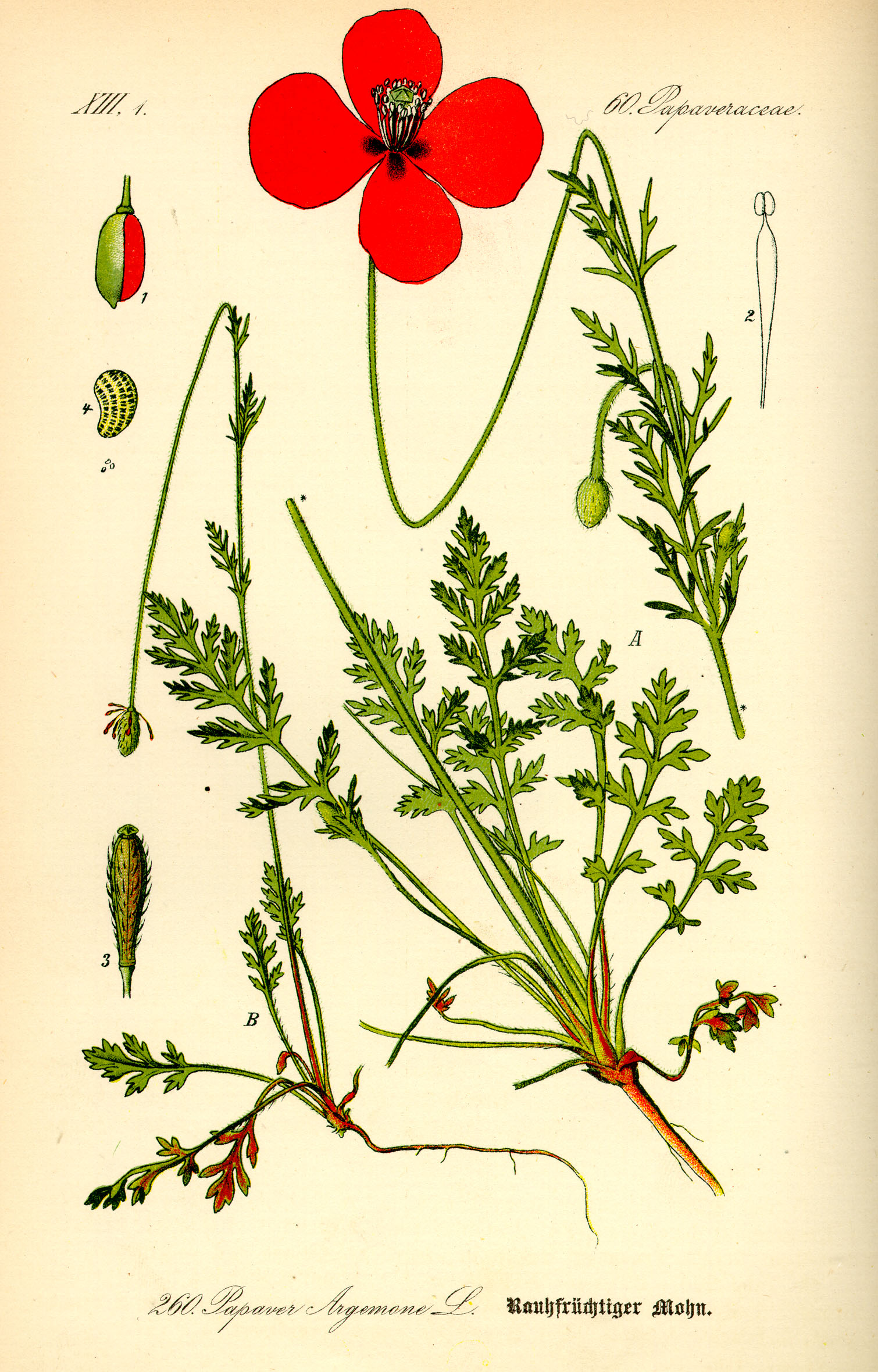
Illustration from Prof. Dr. Otto Wilhelm Thomé's book Flora von Deutschland in 1885

It is commonly known as 'prickly poppy', 'pale poppy', and 'long pricklyhead poppy'. It is known as Sand-Mohn in German, spikvallmo in Swedish, and amapola macho in Spanish.

The Latin specific epithet argemone is derived from the Greek 'argema' meaning cataract, and was applied by Dioscorides to a poppy-like plant used to treat cataracts. See Argemone (a genus of flowering plants in the family Papaveraceae commonly known as 'prickly poppies').

It was formally described by the Swedish botanist Carl Linnaeus in his seminal publication Species Plantarum in 1753 on page 506.

== Distribution and habitat ==
It is native to temperate regions of North Africa, Europe and Western Asia. including Macaronesia, Canary Islands, Algeria, Egypt and Morocco. Within Western Asia it is found in the Caucasus, Armenia, Cyprus, Egypt (in the Sinai), Iran, Iraq, Israel, Jordan, Lebanon, Syria and Turkey. In eastern Europe, it is found within Belarus, Estonia, Latvia, Lithuania, Moldova and Ukraine. In middle Europe, it is in Austria, Belgium, Germany, Hungary, Netherlands, Poland, Slovakia and Switzerland. In northern Europe, in Denmark, Ireland, Sweden and United Kingdom. In southeastern Europe, within Albania, Bosnia and Herzegovina, Croatia, Greece, Italy, Montenegro, North Macedonia, Romania, Serbia and Slovenia. In southwestern Europe, it is found in France, Portugal and Spain.

It has been introduced into the American states of Idaho, Oregon, Pennsylvania and Utah.

=== Habitat ===
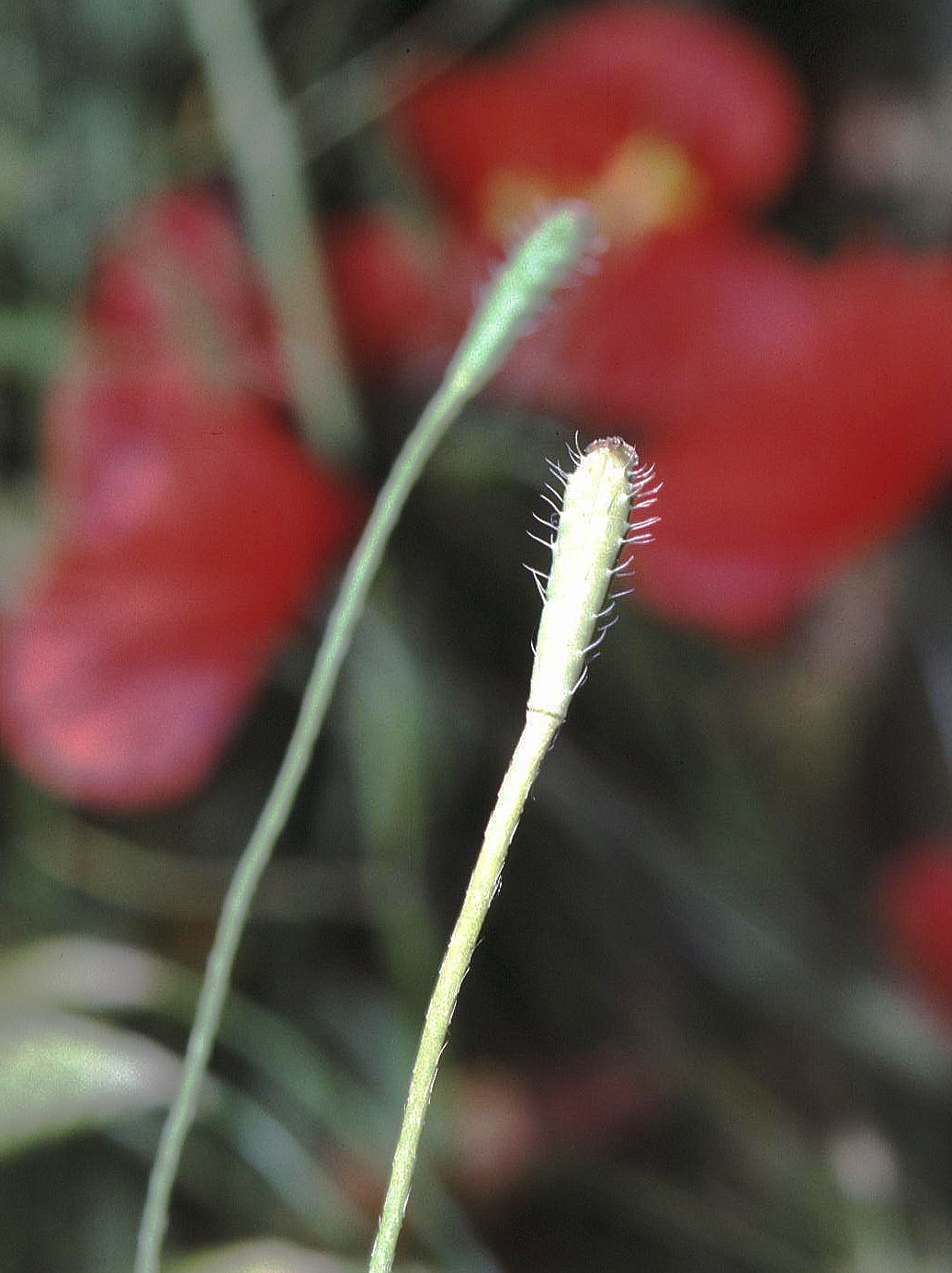
Seed capsule of Papaver argemone

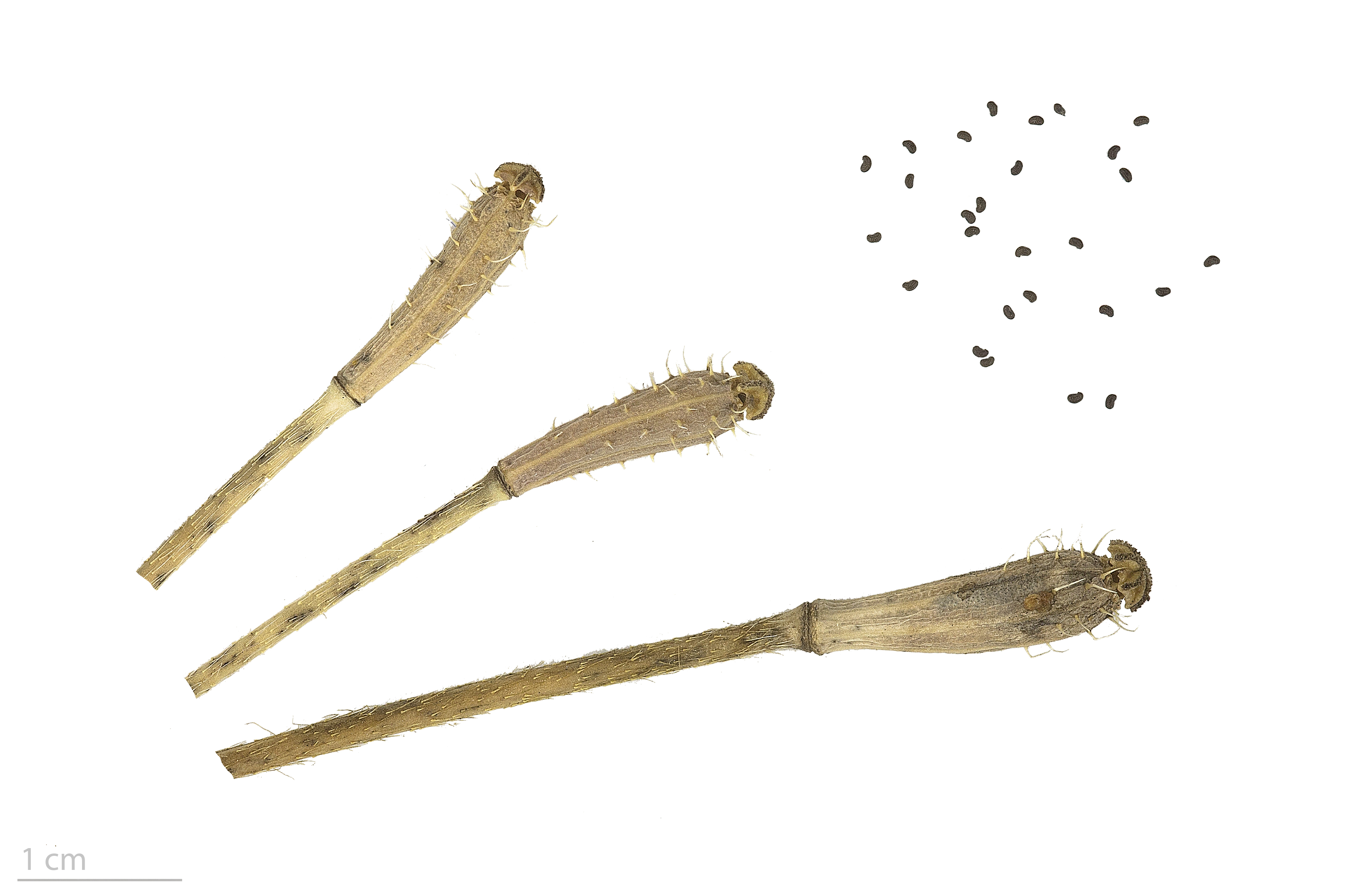
Papaver argemone - MHNT

It grows in fields and disturbed soils (including ploughed). It is normally found at 0–300 m (0–1,000 ft) above sea level.

== Uses ==
In the past, the pale poppy was used in herbal medicines.

== Culture ==
The petal of the poppy, was once used in folklore, as a test of faithfulness. A petal was placed in the palm of the loved ones hand and if when struck with a fist it produced a snapping sound, the loved one was true.

== Other sources ==
- Aldén, B., S. Ryman, & M. Hjertson Svensk Kulturväxtdatabas, SKUD (Swedish Cultivated and Utility Plants Database 2012 (Kulturvaxtdatabas)
- CIBA-GEIGY, Basel, Switzerland The CIBA-GEIGY Weed Tables. 1974 (Weed TabCIBA)
- Davis, P. H., ed. Flora of Turkey and the east Aegean islands. 1965-1988 (F Turk)
- Erhardt, W. et al. Zander: Handwörterbuch der Pflanzennamen, 16. Auflage. 2000 (Zander ed16)
- FNA Editorial Committee Flora of North America. 1993- (F NAmer)
- Greuter, W. et al., eds. Med-Checklist. 1984- (L Medit)
- Grey-Wilson, C. Poppies: The poppy family in the wild and in cultivation. 1993 (Poppies) 137.
- Izquierdo Z., I. et al., eds. Lista de especies silvestres de Canarias: hongos, plantas y animales terrestres. 2004 (L Canarias)
- Jalas, J. & J. Suominen Atlas florae europaeae. 1972- (Atlas Eur)
- Kadereit, J. W. 1986. "A revision of Papaver sect. Argemonidium Notes", Royal Botanical Garden Edinburgh 44:35.
- Kartesz, J. T. "A synonymized checklist of the vascular flora of the United States, Canada, and Greenland". 1994 (L US Can ed2)
- Komarov, V. L. et al., eds. Flora SSSR. 1934-1964 (F USSR)
- Lazarides, M. & B. Hince CSIRO Handbook of Economic Plants of Australia. 1993 (Econ Pl Aust)
- Mouterde, P. Nouvelle flore du Liban et de la Syrie. 1966- (F Liban)
- Rechinger, K. H., ed. Flora iranica. 1963- (F Iran)
- Tutin, T. G. et al., eds. Flora europaea, second edition. 1993 (F Eur ed2)
- Zohary, M. & N. Feinbrun-Dothan Flora palaestina. 1966- (F Palest)
