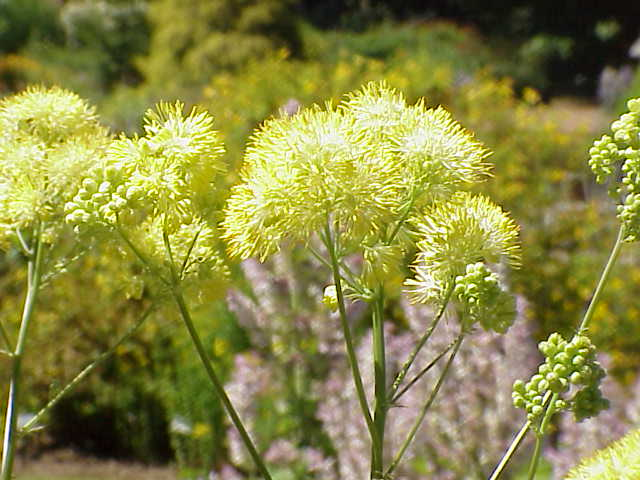

Scientific classification
- Kingdom: Plantae
- Clade: Tracheophytes
- Clade: Angiosperms
- Clade: Eudicots
- Order: Ranunculales
- Family: Ranunculaceae
- Genus: Thalictrum
- Species: T. flavum

Binomial name
- Thalictrum flavum L.

Synonyms
- Thalictrum angustatum Weinm. ex Lecoy.; Thalictrum anonymum Wallr. ex Lecoy.; Thalictrum belgicum Jord.; Thalictrum capitatum Jord.

= Thalictrum flavum =

Species of flowering plant

Thalictrum flavum, known by the common names common meadow-rue, poor man's rhubarb, and yellow meadow-rue, is a flowering plant species in the family Ranunculaceae. Its native range covers temperate regions of Eurasia and North Africa. Growing to 100 cm (39 in) tall by 45 cm (18 in) broad, it is an herbaceous perennial producing clusters of fluffy yellow fragrant flowers in summer.

== Description ==
Thalictrum flavum has fibrous roots, and wedge-shaped, dark green leaves, with a paler green underneath; they are divided into multiple sections. It blooms between June and August. The flowers are composed of short sepals and longer, erect stamens. The sepals are actually white, but the multiple erect, yellow stamens, give the flower a yellow appearance. Later, three fruits are formed from each flower head.

=== Phytochemistry ===
The plant contains an enzyme called pavine N-methyltransferase, which modifies a variety of benzylisoquinoline alkaloids including the eponymous alkaloid pavine. Benzylisoquinoline alkaloids like pavine often have a variety of pharmacological actions, and as a result some have medical uses such as analgesic or anticancer effects while others have significant toxicity. T. flavum also contains another benzylisoquinoline alkaloid, thalidezine, which is also present in other Thalictrum species.

== Taxonomy ==
It was first described and published by Carl Linnaeus, in his book 'Species Plantarum', on page 546 in 1753. The specific epithet flavum means "pure yellow".

The subspecies T. flavum subsp. glaucum (from the word glaucous) has gained the Royal Horticultural Society's Award of Garden Merit. It serves as an alternate host for the wheat disease Wheat Leaf Rust.

The common name 'meadow rue' is thought to have derived from 'meadow rhubarb'.

It is written as 黄唐松草 in Chinese script and known as huang tang song cao in Pidgin in China.

It was verified by United States Department of Agriculture and the Agricultural Research Service on 24 January 1997.

== Distribution and habitat ==
It is very widespread, and is native to temperate regions of Asia, Northern Africa and Europe.

=== Range ===
It is found in Northern Africa within Algeria. In Europe, it is found in (Eastern Europe) Belarus, Estonia, Latvia, Lithuania, Ukraine, (Middle Europe), Austria; Czech Republic, Germany, Hungary, Poland, Slovakia, Switzerland, (northern Europe) Denmark, Finland, Ireland, Norway, Sweden, United Kingdom, (southeastern Europe) Albania, Bosnia and Herzegovina, Bulgaria, Croatia, Italy, Montenegro, North Macedonia, Romania, Serbia, (southwestern Europe) France and Spain. In Asia, it is found in the Caucasus, (within Azerbaijan and Georgia) Russian Federation, (within Amur and Primorye), China, (Xinjiang,) Kazakhstan, Siberia and Turkey.

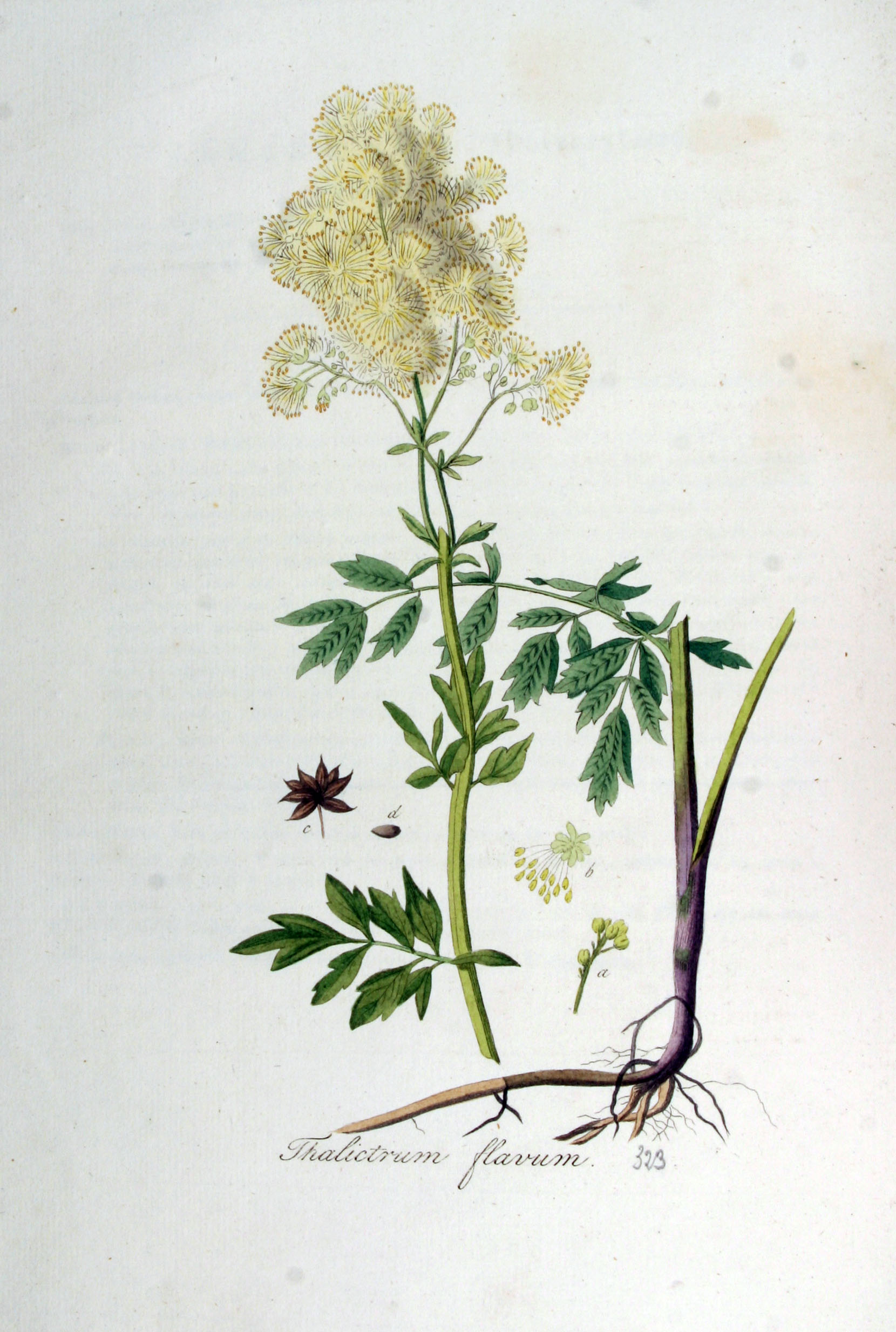
the plant has three web shaped lobed leafletes which are dark green

It has naturalised in the UK, and found in southern and western England, as well as in Scotland and Ireland.

=== Habitat ===
It is found generally in grasslands, marshy fields, fens and riverbanks.

== Ecology ==
It is pollinated mainly by flies and bees, with wind dispersal of the seeds. The larva of the Perizoma sagittata (Marsh Carpet moth) are found on the plant, eating the seeds and the flowers.

== Uses ==
=== Ornamental ===
Thalictrum flavum is cultivated as an ornamental plant. The cultivars Thalictrum 'Tukker Princess' and Thalictrum flavum subsp. glaucum 'Ruth Lynden-Bell' have received the Royal Horticultural Society's Award of Garden Merit.

=== Medicinal ===
It has been used in folk medicine in the UK, the foliage has been used a purgative.

== Other sources ==
- Aldén, B., S. Ryman, & M. Hjertson Svensk Kulturväxtdatabas, SKUD (Swedish Cultivated and Utility Plants Database; online resource on www.skud.info). 2012 (Kulturvaxtdatabas)
- Botanical Society of the British Isles BSBI taxon database (on-line resource). (BSBI)
- Chinese Academy of Sciences Flora reipublicae popularis sinicae. 1959- (F China)
- Davis, P. H., ed. Flora of Turkey and the east Aegean islands. 1965-1988 (F Turk)
- Euro+Med Editorial Committee Euro+Med Plantbase: the information resource for Euro-Mediterranean plant diversity (on-line resource). (EuroMed Plantbase)
- Greuter, W. et al., eds. Med-Checklist. 1984- (L Medit)
- Huxley, A., ed. The new Royal Horticultural Society dictionary of gardening. 1992 (Dict Gard)
- Jalas, J. & J. Suominen Atlas florae europaeae. 1972- (Atlas Eur)
- Komarov, V. L. et al., eds. Flora SSSR. 1934-1964 (F USSR)
