= Slaughterford =

Village in Wiltshire, England

Coordinates: 51.464°N 2.230°W

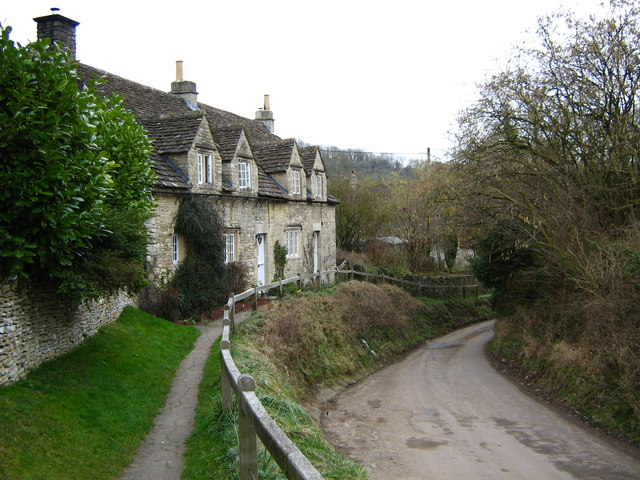
- Lane through Slaughterford

- Location within Wiltshire
- OS grid reference: ST841739
- Civil parish: Biddestone and Slaughterford
- Unitary authority: Wiltshire
- Ceremonial county: Wiltshire
- Region: South West
- Country: England
- Sovereign state: United Kingdom
- Post town: CHIPPENHAM
- Postcode district: SN14
- Dialling code: 01249
- Police: Wiltshire
- Fire: Dorset and Wiltshire
- Ambulance: South Western
- UK Parliament: South Cotswolds

Slaughterford is a small village in the civil parish of Biddestone and Slaughterford, about 5 miles (8 km) west of Chippenham, in Wiltshire, England. The village has a crossing point of the Bybrook River, and lies in a wooded valley between Castle Combe and Box. Anciently it was a separate parish.

== History ==
The weavers' cottages have 16th-century origins. The present Manor Farmhouse dates from 1753, and attached to it is a late medieval barn. A small 18th-century brewery, now a house, has a prominent chimney that points to its past.

Slaughterford was a separate civil parish with its own church until it was merged with Biddestone on 1 April 1934. Its population at the 1931 census had been 67.

The National Gazetteer of Great Britain and Ireland (1868) states:

SLAUGHTERFORD, a parish in the hundred of Chippenham, county of Wilts, 5 miles N. W. of Chippenham, its post town, and 9 E. of Bath. The village, which is considerable, is situated on Box brook, a branch of the river Avon. In the vicinity is Bury-Wood camp, on the Fosse Way. The living is a perpetual curacy annexed to the rectory of Biddestone, in the diocese of Gloucester and Bristol. The church, dedicated to St. Nicholas, is an ancient structure with a tower containing one bell.

== Religious sites ==
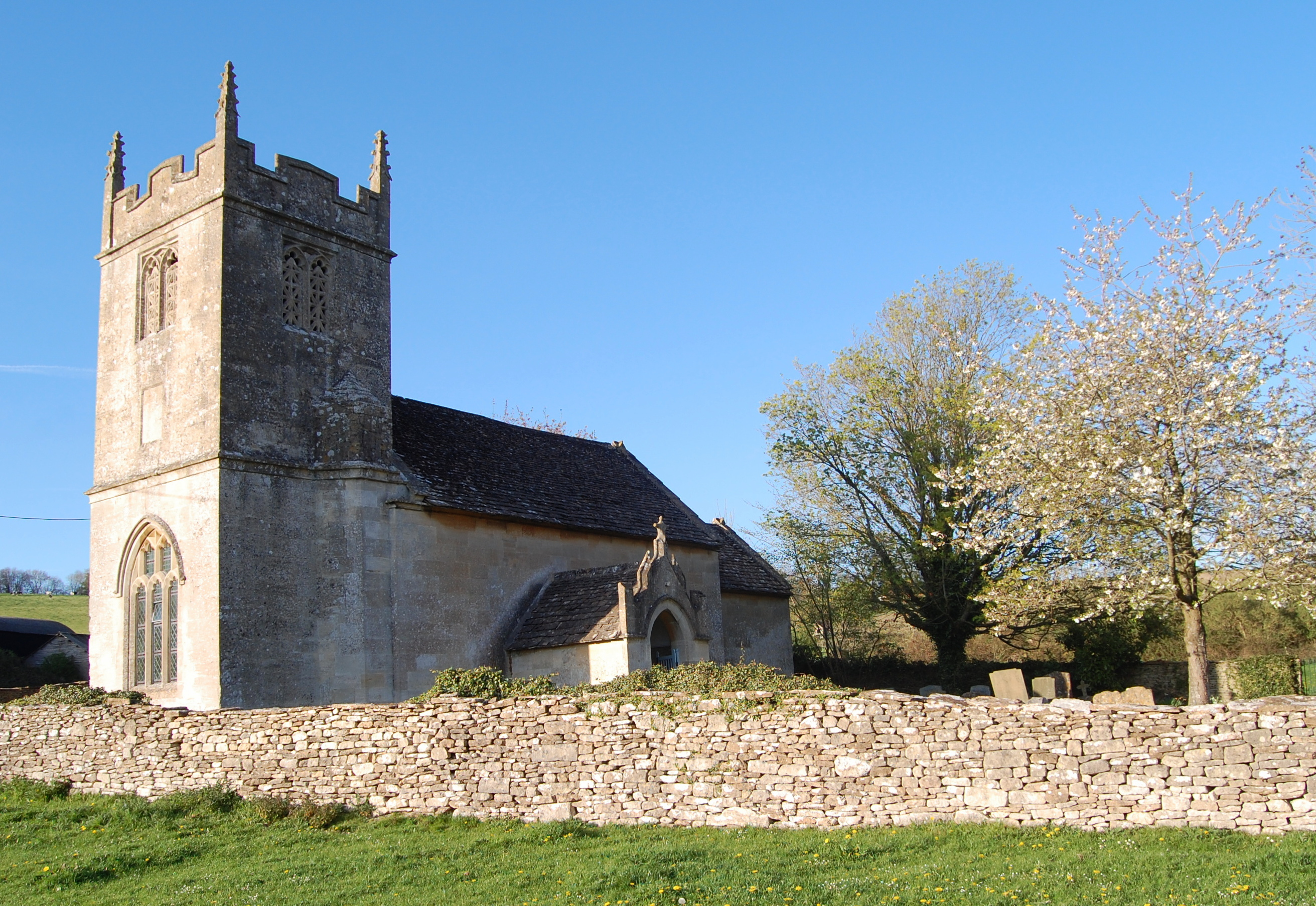
Slaughterford parish church

The Church of St Nicholas of Myra is Grade II* listed. Built in the 15th century, it was partly destroyed about 1649 by Richard Cromwell's troops on their way to Ireland, and lay in ruins until rebuilt in 1823. Further restoration in 1883 included tracery for the windows. The tower has a single bell cast by John Rudhall in 1823, and there is a 20th-century sanctus bell. The benefice was united with Biddestone sometime before 1953, and today the parish is part of the Bybrook Team Ministry.

A Quaker meeting house was set up in the village in the 17th century. It became disused and the building collapsed in the 1960s, although the burial ground survives. Among the Quakers of the village were the Cheevers family.
