= Pavine (molecule) =

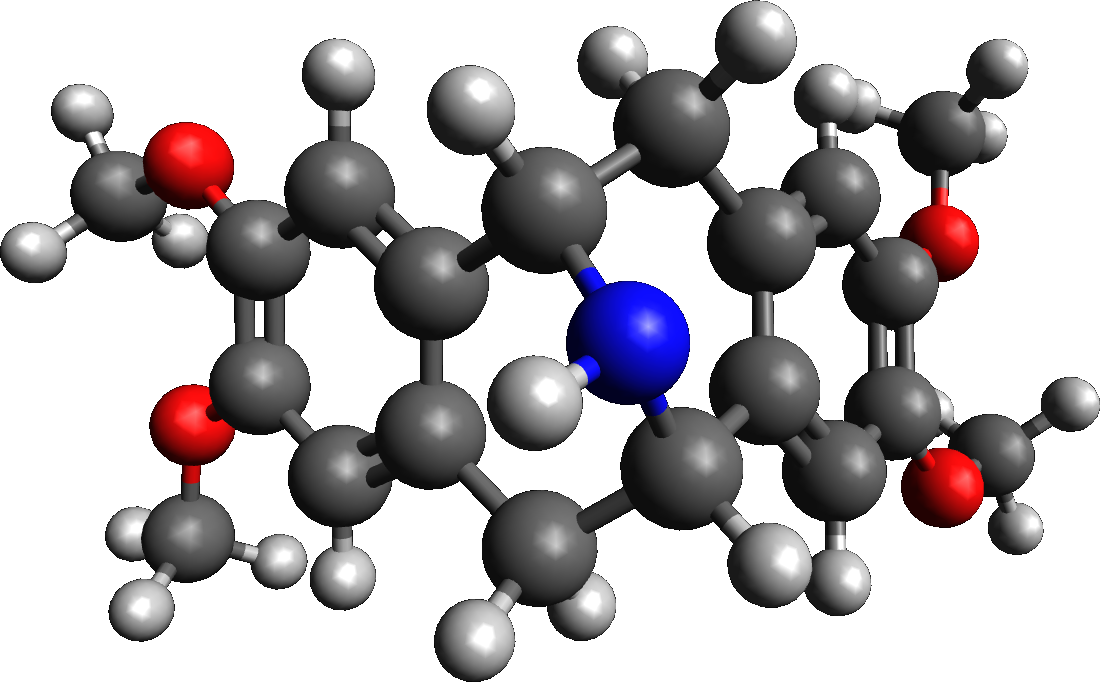

Names
- Other names (+/-)-Pavine

Identifiers
CAS Number	26919-05-1
3D model (JSmol)	Interactive image
ChEBI	CHEBI:77048
ChEMBL	ChEMBL354234
ChemSpider	371590
KEGG	C20771
PubChem CID	419775
CompTox Dashboard (EPA)	DTXSID401046237
- InChI: InChI=1S/C20H23NO4/c1-22-17-7-11-5-15-14-10-20(25-4)18(23-2)8-12(14)6-16(21-15)13(11)9-19(17)24-3/h7-10,15-16,21H,5-6H2,1-4H3 Key: SRSPZLZVGPJHJH-UHFFFAOYSA-N; Key: SRSPZLZVGPJHJH-UHFFFAOYSA-N
- SMILES: COc1cc2c(cc1OC)C3Cc4cc(c(cc4C(C2)N3)OC)OC

Properties
Chemical formula	C_{20}H_{23}NO_{4}
Molar mass	341.407 g·mol^{−1}
- Except where otherwise noted, data are given for materials in their standard state (at 25 °C [77 °F], 100 kPa). Infobox references

Pavine is an alkaloid found in a variety of plants in four families, Papaveraceae, Berberidaceae, Lauraceae, and Ranunculaceae.

The elucidation of its chemical structure was reported in 1955.

== Examples ==
1. The N-methyl derivative of pavine is argemonine.
2. Californine
3. Caryachine
4. Isonorargemonine
5. Platycerine

== See also ==
- Isopavine, a related alkaloid
