= History of Christianity in Great Britain =

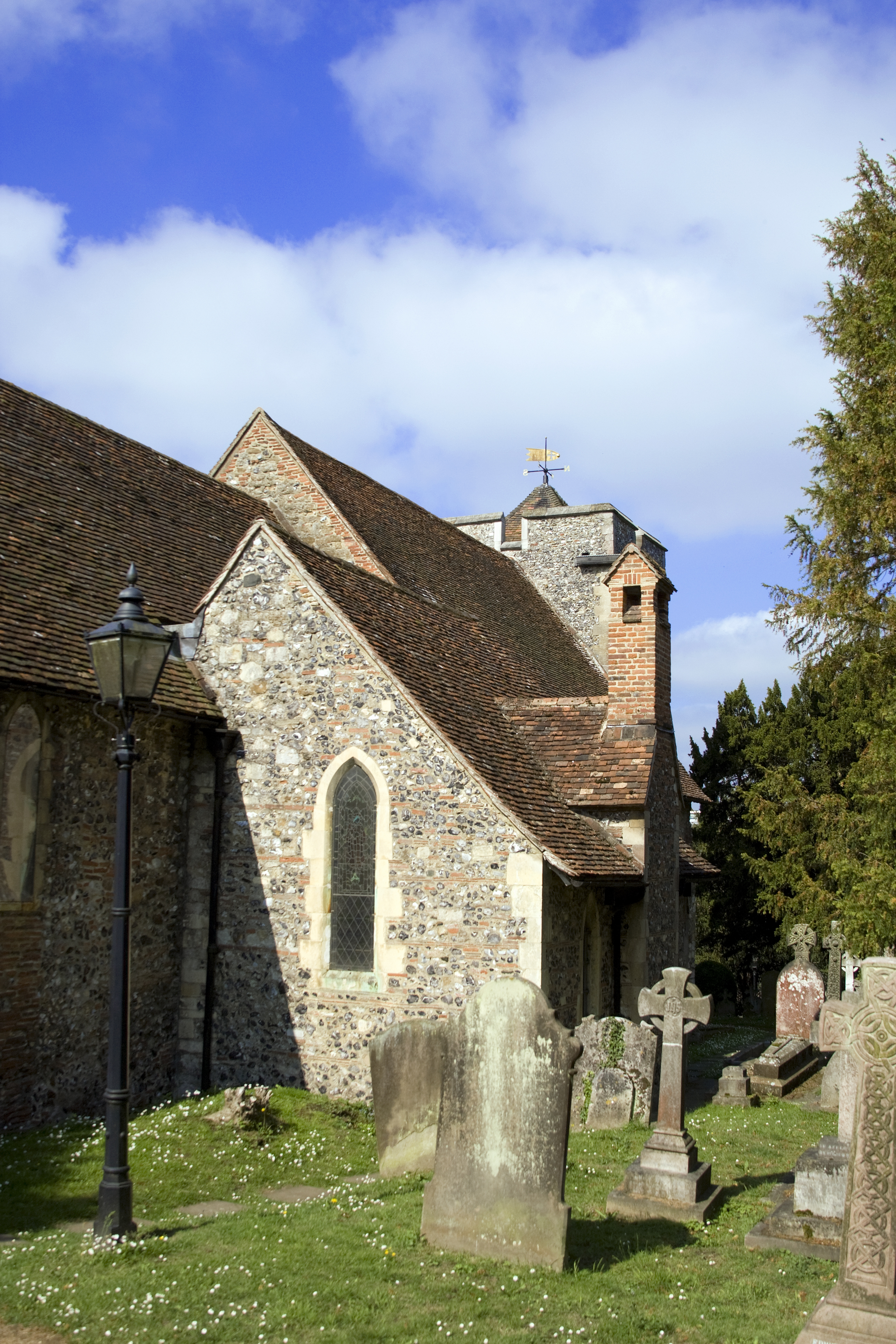
The Church of St Martin in Canterbury is the oldest extant church building in Great Britain still in use as a church. It is the oldest Anglican parish church.

Christianity first appeared in Great Britain in antiquity, during the Roman period. The Roman Catholic Church was the dominant form of Christianity in Great Britain from the 6th century through to the Reformation era in the Middle Ages. The (Anglican) Church of England became the independent established church in England and Wales in 1534 as a result of the English Reformation. In Wales, disestablishment took place in 1920 when the Church in Wales became independent from the Church of England. In Scotland, the (Presbyterian) Church of Scotland, established in a separate Scottish Reformation in the 16th century, is recognised as the national church, but not established.

Following the Reformation, adherence to the Catholic Church continued at various levels in different parts of Great Britain, especially among recusants and in the north of England. Particularly from the mid-17th century, forms of Protestant nonconformity, including Baptists, Quakers, Congregationalists, English Presbyterians and, later, Methodists, grew outside of the established church.

== Roman Britain ==
People in Roman Britain typically believed in a wide range of gods and goddesses, and worshipped several of them, likely selecting some local and tribal deities as well as some of the major divinities venerated across the Empire. Both indigenous British deities and introduced Roman counterparts were venerated in the region, sometimes syncretising together, as in cases like Apollo-Cunomaglus and Sulis-Minerva. Romano-British temples were sometimes erected at locations that had earlier been cultic sites in pre-Roman Iron Age Britain. A new style of "Romano-Celtic temple" developed, influenced by both Iron Age and imperial Roman architectural styles but distinct from both; buildings in this style remained in use until the 4th century. The cults of various eastern deities had also been introduced to Roman Britain, among them Isis, Mithras, and Cybele; Christianity was one of these eastern cults. The archaeologist Martin Henig suggested that to "sense something of the spiritual environment of Christianity at this time", one could compare it to modern India, where Hinduism, "a major polytheistic system", remains dominant, and "where churches containing images of Christ and the Virgin are in a tiny minority against the many temples of gods and goddesses".

== England ==
=== Celts ===
The late Romano-British population seem to have been mostly Christian by the Sub-Roman period. The Great Conspiracy in the 360s and increased raiding around the time of the Roman withdrawal from Britain saw some enslaved. Later medieval legends concerning the conversion of the island under King Lucius (Note: First attested in a 9th-century manuscript of Pope Boniface II's c. 530 "Felician" edition of Liber Pontificalis) or from a mission by Philip the Apostle (Note: As permitted by William of Malmesbury.) or Joseph of Arimathea (Note: First attested in William of Malmesbury's On the Antiquity of the Glastonbury Church, which was written during the 1130s, although the passages dealing with Joseph seem to be later additions to the text.) have been discredited as "pious forgeries" attempting to establish independence or seniority in the ecclesiastical hierarchy of Norman times. The first archaeological evidence and credible records showing a community large enough to maintain churches and bishops date to the 3rd and 4th centuries. These more formal organisational structures arose from materially modest beginnings: the British delegation to the 353 Council of Ariminum had to beg for financial assistance from its fellows in order to return home. The Saxon invasions of Britain destroyed most of the formal church structures in the east of Britain as they progressed, replacing Christianity with a form of Germanic polytheism. There seems to have been a lull in the Saxon westward expansion traditionally attributed to the Battle of Badon but, with the Yellow Plague of Rhos caused by the arrival of the Plague of Justinian around 547, the expansion resumed. By the time Cornwall was subjugated by Wessex at Hingston Down in 838, however, it was largely left to its native people and practices, which remained inherently Christian. St Piran's Oratory dates to the 6th century, making it one of the oldest extant Christian sites in Britain.

=== Anglo-Saxons ===
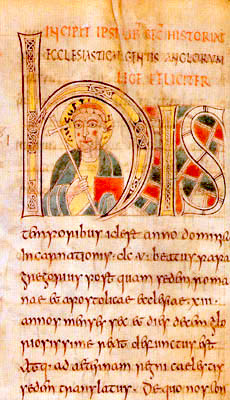
Portrait labelled avgvstinvs from the mid-8th-century Saint Petersburg Bede, though perhaps intended as Gregory the Great (Note: The name is in the halo, in a later hand. The figure is identified as a saint by his clerical tonsure, and is the earliest surviving historiated initial. The view that it represents Gregory is set out by Douglas Dales in a recent article.)

While Christianity survived continuously in the culturally Brittonic west, it was extinguished in the east with the arrival of the Saxons until it was reintroduced to eastern Britain by the Gregorian Mission, c. 600. From the seat of his archdiocese at Canterbury, Augustine of Canterbury, with help from Celtic missionaries such as Aidan and Cuthbert, successfully established churches in Kent and then Northumbria: the two provinces of the English Church continue to be led from the cathedrals of Canterbury and York (est. 735). However, Augustine failed to establish his authority over the Welsh church at Chester. Owing to the importance of the Scottish missions, Northumbria initially followed the native Church in its calculation of Easter and tonsure but then aligned itself with Canterbury and Rome at the 664 Synod of Whitby. Early English Christian documents surviving from this time include the 7th-century illuminated Lindisfarne Gospels and the historical accounts written by the Venerable Bede.

=== Normans ===
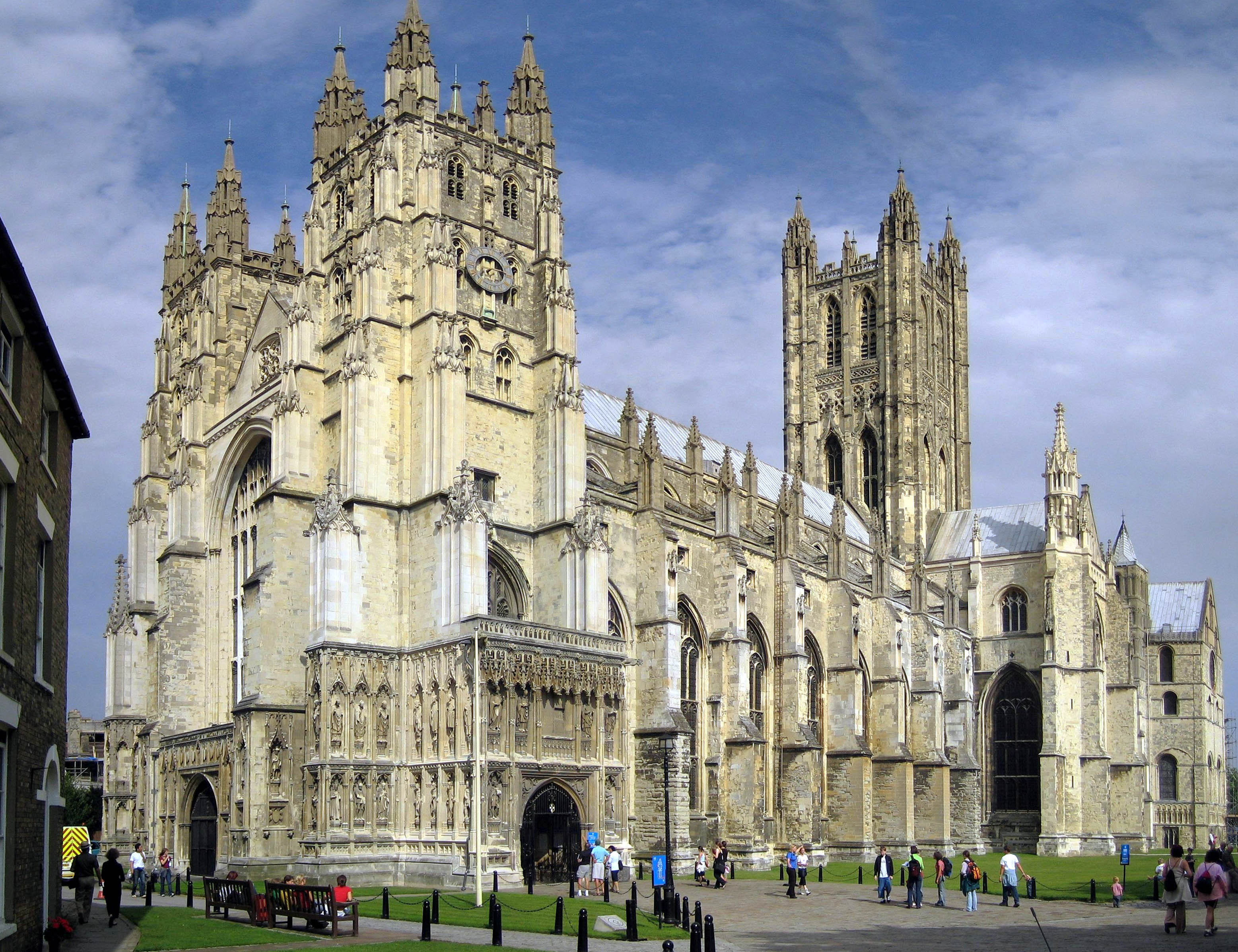
Canterbury Cathedral, rebuilt in the Romanesque style in the 1070s, in the Gothic style following a fire in 1174, and in the Perpendicular style following an earthquake in 1382

Christianity after the Norman Conquest was generally separatist, its kings claiming the right to overrule the pope in appointing bishops.

By the 11th century, the Normans had overrun England and begun the invasion of Wales. Osmund, bishop of Salisbury, codified the Sarum Rite and, by the time of his successor, Roger, a system of endowed prebends had been developed that left ecclesiastical positions independent of the bishop. During the reign of Henry II, the rising popularity of the Grail myth stories coincided with the increasingly central role of communion in Church rituals. Tolerance of commendatory benefices permitted the well-connected to hold multiple offices simply for their spiritual and temporal revenues, subcontracting the position's duties to lower clerics or simply treating them as sinecures. The importance of such revenues prompted the Investiture Crisis, which erupted in Britain over the fight occasioned by King John's refusal to accept Stephen Langton, Pope Innocent III's nominee, as archbishop of Canterbury. England was placed under interdict in 1208 and John excommunicated the following year; he enjoyed the seizure of the Church's revenues but finally relented owing to domestic and foreign rivals strengthened by papal opposition. Although John quickly reneged on his payments, Innocent thereafter took his side and roundly condemned Magna Carta, calling it "not only shameful and demeaning but illegal and unjust". A major reform movement or heresy of the 14th century was Lollardy, led by John Wycliffe, who translated the Bible into English. Posthumously condemned, his body was exhumed and burnt and its ashes thrown into the River Swift.

Even before the Conquest, Edward the Confessor had returned from Normandy with masons who constructed Westminster Abbey (1042) in the Romanesque style. The cruciform churches of Norman architecture often had deep chancels and a square crossing tower, which has remained a feature of English ecclesiastical architecture. England has many early cathedrals, most notably Winchester Cathedral (1079), York Minster (1080), Durham Cathedral (1093), and (New) Salisbury Cathedral (1220). After a fire damaged Canterbury Cathedral in 1174, Norman masons introduced the Gothic style, which developed into the English Gothic at Wells and Lincoln Cathedrals around 1191. Oxford and Cambridge began as religious schools in the 11th and 13th centuries, respectively.

=== English Reformation ===
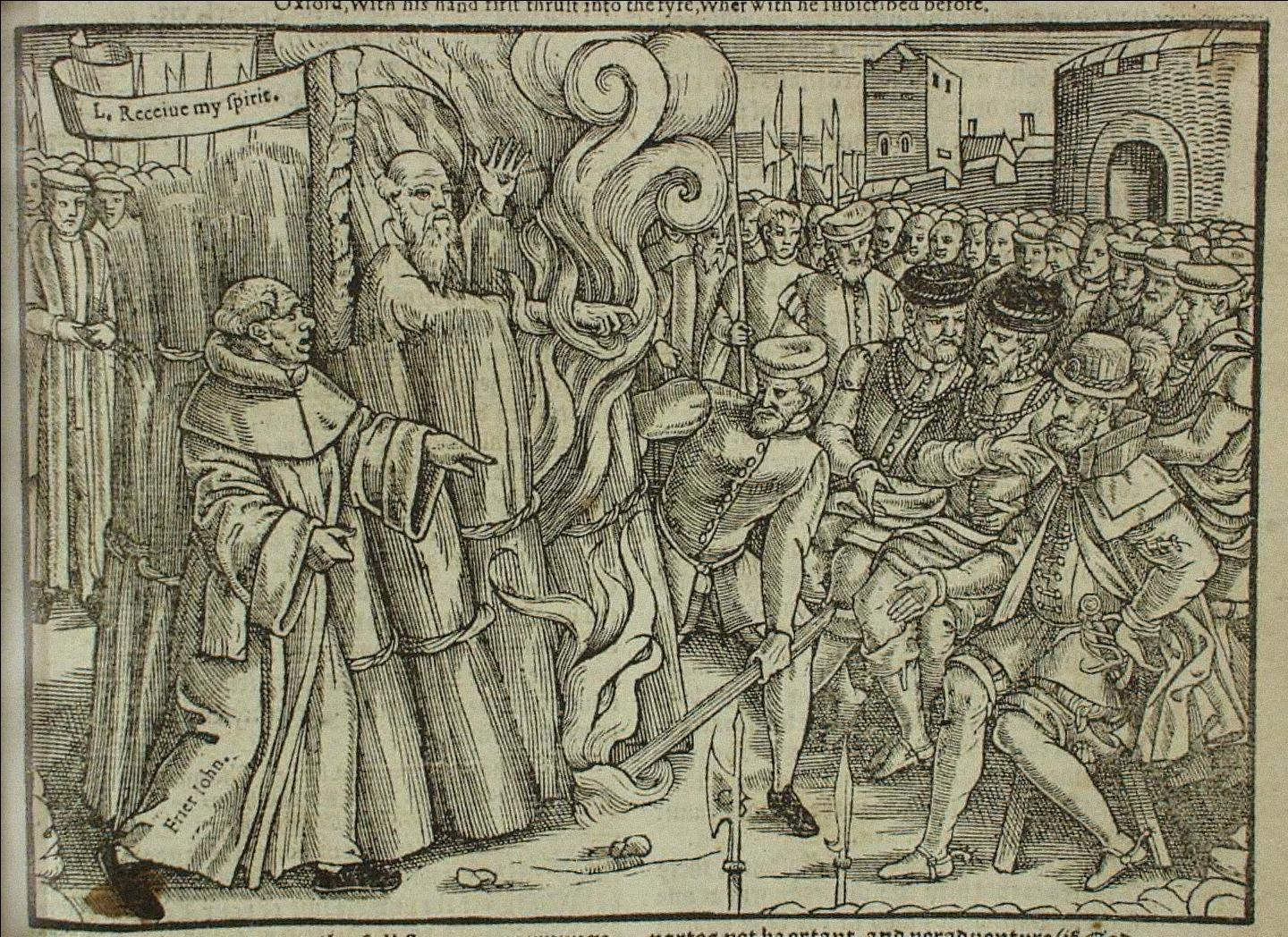
Thomas Cranmer, archbishop of Canterbury and author of the first two books of common prayer, being burned at the stake during the Marian Persecutions, from John Foxe's Book of Martyrs

Henry VIII was named Defender of the Faith (Fidei Defensor) for his opposition to Martin Luther's Reformation. The fact he had no living son and the pope's inability to permit him a divorce from his wife while her nephew's armies held Rome, however, prompted Henry to summon the Reformation Parliament and to invoke the statute of praemunire against the English Church, ultimately leading to the 1532 Submission of the Clergy and the 1534 Acts of Supremacy that made the Church of England an independent national church, no longer under the governance of the Pope, but with the King as Supreme Governor. (It is sometimes incorrectly stated that the Church of England was established at this time. The Church of England was a province of the Catholic Church at least since c. 600 AD. when Augustine became the first Archbishop of Canterbury. Therefore the Church of England could not have been established at a time when it had existed for over 900 years.) A law passed the same year made it an act of treason to publicly oppose these measures; John Fisher and Thomas More and many others were martyred for their continued Catholicism. Fear of foreign invasion was a concern until the 1588 rout of the Spanish Armada, but land sales after the Dissolution of the lesser and greater monasteries united most of the aristocracy behind the change. Religious rebellions in Lincolnshire and Yorkshire in 1536, in Cumberland in 1537, and in Devon and Cornwall in 1549 were quickly dealt with. The doctrine of the English Reformation differed little at first except with regard to royal authority over canon law: Lutheranism remained condemned and John Frith, Robert Barnes, and other Protestants were also martyred, including William Tyndale, whose Obedience of a Christian Man inspired Henry's break with Rome and whose translation of the Bible formed the basis of Henry's own authorised Great Bible. Meanwhile, laws in 1535 and 1542 fully merged Wales with England.

For the next 150 years, religious policy varied with the ruler: Edward VI and his regents favoured greater Protestantism, including new books of Common Prayer and Common Order. His sister Mary I restored Catholicism after negotiations with the pope ended Rome's claims to the former Church lands, but two false pregnancies left her sister Elizabeth I as her heir. Upon Elizabeth's ascension, the 1558 Act of Uniformity, 1559 Act and Oath of Supremacy, and the Thirty-Nine Articles of 1563 formed the Religious Settlement which restored the Protestant Church of England. The vicissitudes of the clergy during the period were satirised in "The Vicar of Bray". The papal bull Regnans in Excelsis supporting the Rising of the North and the Irish Desmond Rebellions against Elizabeth proved ineffective, but similarly ineffective were the Marian exiles who returned from Calvin's Geneva as Puritans. James I supported the bishops of Anglicanism and the production of an authoritative English Bible while easing persecution against Catholics; several attempts against his person — including the Bye and Gunpowder Plots — finally led to harsher measures. Charles I provoked the Bishops' Wars in Scotland and ultimately the Civil War in England. The victorious Long Parliament restructured the Church at the 1643 Westminster Assembly and issued a new confession of faith. (The English Baptists drew up their own in 1689.) Following the Restoration, onerous Penal Laws were enacted against Dissenters, including the Clarendon Code. Charles II and James II tried to declare royal indulgences of other faiths in 1672 and in 1687; the former was withdrawn in favour of the first Test Act, which—along with the Popish Plot—led to the Exclusion Crisis, and the latter contributed to the Glorious Revolution of 1688.

=== 1689–1945 ===
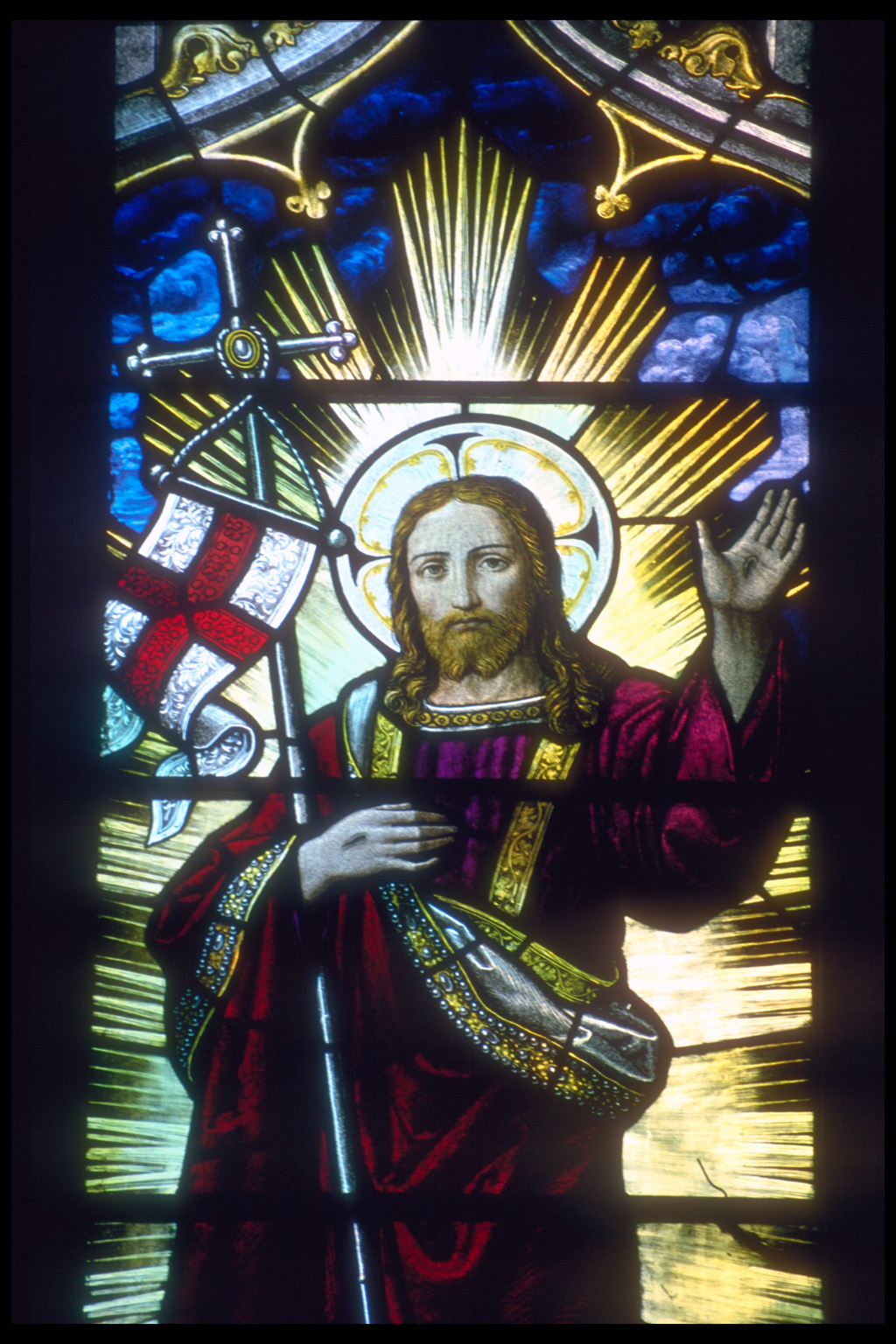
A stained-glass window of Jesus in Rochester Cathedral in Kent, incorporating the Flag of England

The religious settlement of 1689 shaped policy down to the 1830s. The Church of England was not only dominant in religious affairs, but it blocked outsiders from responsible positions in national and local government, business, professions and academia. In practice, the doctrine of the divine right of kings persisted, old animosities had diminished, and a new spirit of toleration was abroad. Restrictions on Nonconformists were mostly either ignored or slowly lifted. The Protestants, including the Quakers, who worked to overthrow King James II were rewarded. Toleration Act 1688 allowed Nonconformists who have their own chapels, teachers and preachers, and censorship was relaxed.

==== Anti-Catholicism ====
Harsh penalties on Catholicism remained until the threat of a French restoration of the Catholic Stuart kings ended, but they were seldom enforced, and afterwards were slowly lifted until Catholic emancipation was achieved in 1829. The failure of the pro-Catholic Jacobite rebellions and papal recognition of George III after the death of J. F. E. Stuart in 1766 permitted the gradual removal of anti-Catholic laws, a process known as the Catholic Emancipation, which included the Restoration of the English hierarchy.

==== The Evangelical Revival ====
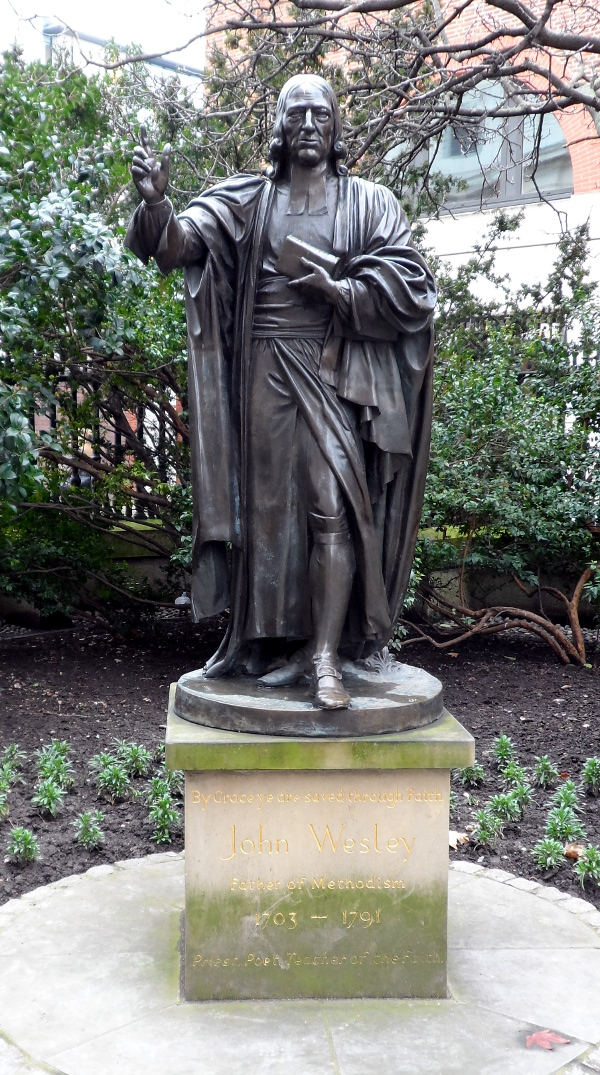
Statue of Methodism's founder John Wesley in St Paul's Churchyard

The evangelical movement inside and outside the Church of England gained strength in the late 18th and early 19th centuries. The movement challenged the traditional religious sensibility that emphasised a code of honour for the upper-class, and suitable behaviour for everyone else, together with faithful observances of rituals. John Wesley (1703–1791) and his followers preached revivalist religion, trying to convert individuals to a personal relationship with Christ through Bible reading, regular prayer, and especially the revival experience. Wesley himself preached 52,000 times, calling on men and women to "redeem the time" and save their souls. Wesley always operated inside the Church of England, but at his death, it set up outside institutions that became the Methodist Church. It stood alongside the traditional nonconformism of Presbyterians, Congregationalist, Baptists, Unitarians and Quakers. The earlier Nonconformists, however, were less influenced by revivalism.

The Church of England remained dominant, but it had a growing evangelical, revivalist faction: the "Low Church". Its leaders included William Wilberforce and Hannah More. It reached the upper class through the Clapham Sect. It did not seek political reform, but rather the opportunity to save souls through political action by freeing slaves, abolishing the duel, prohibiting cruelty to children and animals, stopping gambling, and avoiding frivolity on the Sabbath. They read the Bible every day. All souls were equal in God's view, but not all bodies, so evangelicals did not challenge the hierarchical structure of English society.

==== Census of 1851 ====
As part of the regular census in 1851, the Government conducted a census in England and Wales of attendance at religious services on 30 March 1851. Reports were collected from local ministers who reported attendance at their services on 30 March 1851. The effect of individuals attending multiple services (morning/afternoon/evening) could not be fully accounted for, but the estimated number of individuals attending a service at some point in the day was 7,261,032 people. The number of individuals attending morning services was 4,647,482, and the total number of attendees (including duplicates) was 10,896,066. The total population at the time was 17.9 million.

==== Missionary activity ====
With the First British Empire at its greatest height during the 18th century, Anglican and Methodist missionaries were active in the 13 American Colonies. The Methodists, led by George Whitefield, were the most successful and after the revolution and entirely distinct American Methodist denomination emerged that became the largest Protestant denomination in the new United States. A major problem for colonial officials was the demand of the Church of England to set up an American bishop; this was strongly opposed by most of the Americans and never happened. Increasingly colonial officials took a neutral position on religious matters, even in those colonies such as Virginia where the Church of England was officially established, but in practice controlled by laymen in the local vestries. After the Americans broke free, British officials decided to enhance the power and wealth of the Church of England in all the settler colonies, especially British North America (Canada).

During the New Imperialism of the 19th century, the London Missionary Society and others like it were active In the British Empire around the world, notably including the work of the Scotsman David Livingstone in Africa. New religious orders were also established within the Anglican fold.

All the main denominations were involved in 19th-century missions, including the Church of England, the Presbyterians of Scotland, and the Nonconformists. Much of the enthusiasm emerged from the Evangelical revival. Within the Church of England, the Church Mission Society (CMS) originated in 1799 and went on to undertake activity all around the world, including in what became known as "the Middle East".

Missionary societies funded their own operations that were not supervised or directed by the Colonial Office. Tensions emerged between the missionaries and the colonial officials. The latter feared that missionaries might stir up trouble or encourage the natives to challenge colonial authority. In general, colonial officials were much more comfortable with working with the established local leadership, including the native religions, rather than introducing the divisive force of Christianity. This proved especially troublesome in India, where very few local elites were attracted to Christianity. In Africa, especially, the missionaries made many converts. By the 21st century there were more Anglicans in Nigeria than in England, and they were culturally and theologically much more conservative.

Missionaries increasingly came to focus on education, medical help, and long-term modernisation of the native personality to inculcate European middle-class values. They established schools and medical clinics. Christian missionaries played a public role, especially in promoting sanitation and public health. Many were trained as physicians, or took special courses in public health and tropical medicine at Livingstone College, London.

==== 1900–1945 ====
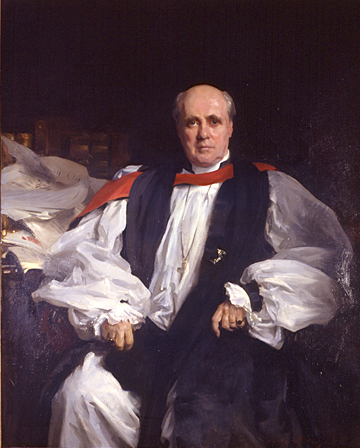
Randall Davidson, Archbishop of Canterbury, 1903–1928

In the 20th century, the Liturgical and Ecumenical Movements were important developments. Randall Davidson, Archbishop of Canterbury from 1903 to 1928, was perhaps the most influential of the churchmen.

A curious case was Ernest Barnes (1874–1953), Anglican Bishop of Birmingham, who was a highly visible modernist opposed to Anglo-Catholic practices and rituals. He preached Darwinism and ridiculed many Christian beliefs, especially the sacrament of Holy Communion and the bodily Resurrection of Christ. This led to calls that he should resign as a bishop; he refused, but Davidson made a gentle attack on Barnes in an open letter.

Although the overall population was growing steadily, and the Catholic membership was keeping pace, the Protestants were slipping behind. Out of 30–50 million adults, they dropped slowly from 5.7 million members in 1920, and 5.4 million in 1940, to 4.3 million in 1970. The Church of England decline was parallel. Methodism, the largest of the Nonconformists reached a peak of 841,000 members in Great Britain in 1910, slipped to 802,000 in 1920, 792,000 in 1940, 729,000 in 1960, and 488,000 in 1980. The Nonconformists had built a strong base in industrial districts that specialised in mining textiles agriculture and fishing; those were declining industries, whose share of the total male workforce was in steady decline, from 21 per cent in 1921 to 13 per cent in 1951. As families migrated to southern England, or to the suburbs, they often lost contact with their childhood religion. Political reverberations were most serious for the Liberal Party, which was largely based in the Nonconformist community, and which rapidly lost membership in the 1920s as its leadership quarrelled, the Irish Catholics and many from the working-class moved to the Labour Party, and part of the middle class moved to the Conservative party. Hoping to stem the membership decline, the three major Methodist groups united in 1932. In Scotland the two major Presbyterian groups, the Church of Scotland and the United Free Church, merged in 1929 for the same reason. Nonetheless the steady declension continued. The Nonconformists showed not just a decline in membership but a dramatic fall in enthusiasm. Sunday school attendance plummeted; there were far fewer new ministers. Antagonism toward Anglicanism sharply declined, and many prominent Nonconformists became Anglicans, including some leading ministers. There was a falling away in the size and fervour of congregations, less interest in funding missionaries, a decline in intellectualism, and persistent complaints about the lack of money. Commentator D. W. Brogan reported in 1943:

In the generation that has passed since the great Liberal landslide of 1906, one of the greatest changes in the English religious and social landscape has been the decline of Nonconformity. Partly that decline has been due to the general weakening of the hold of Christianity on the English people, partly it has been due to the comparative irrelevance of the peculiarly Nonconformist (as a part from Christian) view of the contemporary world and its problems.

One aspect of the long-term decline in religiosity was that Protestants showed increasingly less interest in sending their children to faith schools. In localities across England, fierce battles were fought between the Nonconformists, Anglicans, and Catholics, each with their own school systems supported by taxes, and secular schools, and taxpayers. The Nonconformists had long taken the lead in fighting the Anglicans, who a century before had practically monopolised education. The Anglican share of the elementary school population fell from 57 per cent in 1918 to 39 per cent in 1939. With the sustained decline in Nonconformist enthusiasm their schools closed one after another. In 1902, the Methodist church operated 738 schools; only 28 remained in 1996.

Britain continued to think of itself as a Christian country; there were a few atheists or nonbelievers, and unlike the continent, there was no anti-clericalism worthy of note. A third or more prayed every day. Large majorities used formal Church services to mark birth, marriage and death. The great majority believed in God and heaven, although belief in hell fell off after all the deaths of the World War. After 1918, Church of England services stopped practically all discussion of hell.

As anti-Catholicism declined sharply after 1910, the Catholic Church grew in numbers, grew rapidly in terms of priests and sisters, and expanded their parishes from intercity industrial areas to more suburban locales. Although underrepresented in the higher levels of the social structure, apart from a few old aristocratic Catholic families, Catholic talent was emerging in journalism and diplomacy. A striking development was the surge in highly publicised conversion of intellectuals and writers including most famously G. K. Chesterton, as well as Christopher Dawson, Maurice Baring, Ronald Knox, Sheila Kaye-Smith, William E. Orchard, Alfred Noyes, Rosalind Murray, Arnold Lunn, Eric Gill, David Jones, Evelyn Waugh, Graham Greene, Manya Harari, and Frank Pakenham.

=== Since 1945 ===
Present debates concern the ordination of women and the acceptance of homosexuality within the Church and clergy. The established church continues to count many more baptised members, although immigration from other countries means that the restored Catholic Church in England and Wales now has greater attendance at its weekly services.

While identifying significant decline in statistical data of church attendance from the 1950s onwards, Paul Backholer, author of Britain, A Christian Country, found notable exceptions to the decline, which includes the up to two million people who attended Billy Graham's United Kingdom campaigns from 1954 to 1955. With Wembley Stadium filled to overflowing with 120,000 people, Graham's meeting on Sunday 23 May 1954 was called, "Britain's biggest religious meeting of all time." Subsequent renewal movements include the Pentecostal movement, the Charismatic Renewal and more recently, rapid growth in ethnic minority churches. While church attendance continues to decline, he concludes Britain remains, "Historically and culturally Christian in nature," something he notes is recognised by significant leaders of minority faiths in Britain, as an expression of tolerance.

==== Roman Catholics ====
English Catholicism continued to grow throughout the first two thirds of the 20th century, when it was associated primarily with elements in the English intellectual class and the ethnic Irish population. Rates of attending Mass remained very high in stark contrast with the Anglican church and Nonconformist Protestant churches. Clergy numbers, which began the 20th century at under 3,000, reached a high of 7,500 in 1971.

By the latter years of the 20th century low numbers of vocations also affected the church with ordinations to the priesthood dropping from the hundreds in the late 20th century into the teens in 2006–2011; 20 men were ordained to the diocesan priesthood in 2011 and 31 in 2012.

The upward social movement of Irish Catholics out of the working-class into the middle-class suburban mainstream often meant their assimilation with broader, secular English society and loss of a separate Catholic identity. The Second Vatican Council has been followed, as in other Western countries, by divisions between traditional Catholicism and a more liberal form of Catholicism claiming inspiration from the Council. This caused difficulties for not a few pre-conciliar converts, though others have still joined the Church in recent decades (for instance, Malcolm Muggeridge and Joseph Pearce), and public figures (often descendants of the recusant families) such as Paul Johnson; Peter Ackroyd; Antonia Fraser; Mark Thompson, Director-General of the BBC; Michael Martin, first Catholic to hold the office of Speaker of the House of Commons since the Reformation; Chris Patten, first Catholic to hold the post of Chancellor of Oxford since the Reformation; Piers Paul Read; Helen Liddel, Britain's High Commissioner to Australia; and former Prime Minister's wife, Cherie Blair, have no difficulty making their Catholicism known in public life. The former Prime Minister, Tony Blair, was received into full communion with the Catholic Church in 2007. Catherine Pepinster, Editor of Tablet, notes: "The impact of Irish immigrants is one. There are numerous prominent campaigners, academics, entertainers (like Danny Boyle the most successful Catholic in showbiz owing to his film, Slumdog Millionaire), politicians and writers. But the descendants of the recusant families are still a force in the land."

== Scotland ==
=== Scottish Reformation ===
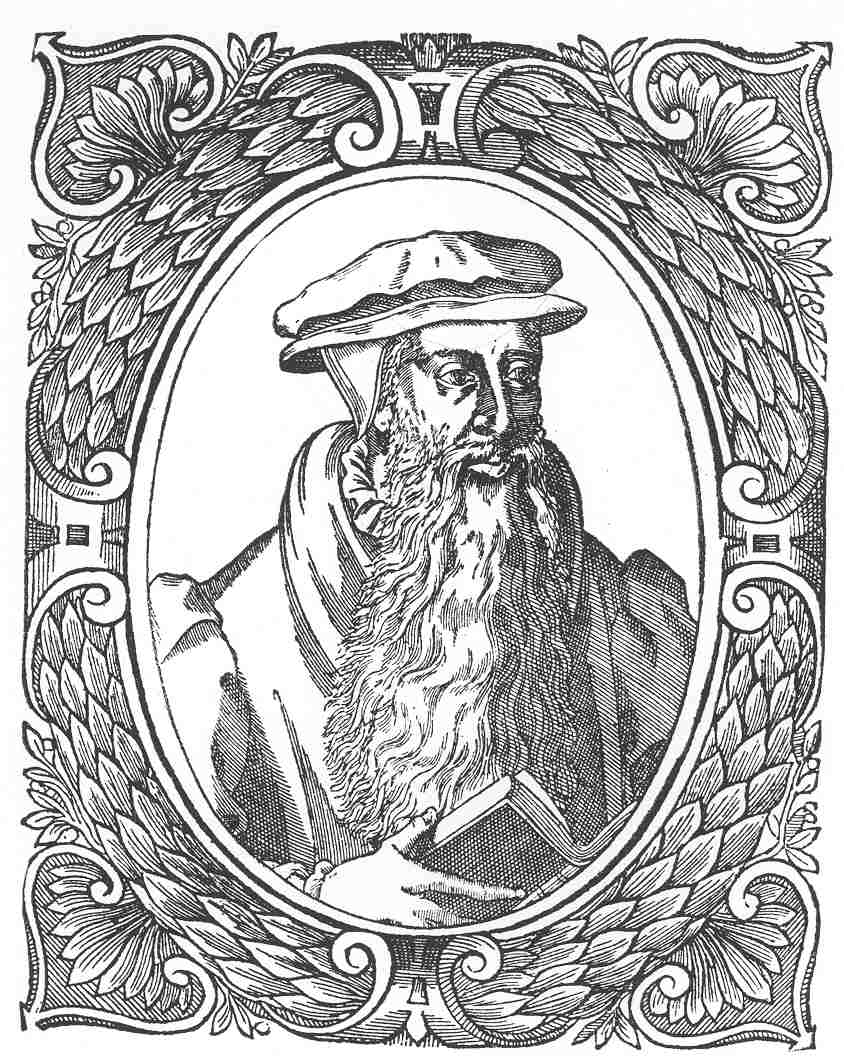
In 1559, John Knox returned from ministering in Geneva to lead the Calvinist reformation in Scotland.

During the 16th century, Scotland underwent a Protestant Reformation that created a Calvinist national Kirk, which became Presbyterian in outlook and severely reduced the powers of bishops. Remnants of Catholic and Episcopal religion remained, however. In the earlier part of the century, the teachings of first Martin Luther and then John Calvin began to influence Scotland, particularly through Scottish scholars, often training for the priesthood, who had visited Continental universities. The Lutheran preacher Patrick Hamilton was executed for heresy in St. Andrews in 1528. The execution of others, especially the Zwingli-influenced George Wishart, who was burnt at the stake on the orders of Cardinal Beaton in 1546, angered Protestants. Wishart's supporters assassinated Beaton soon after and seized St. Andrews Castle, which they held for a year before they were defeated with the help of French forces. The survivors, including chaplain John Knox, were condemned to be galley slaves in France, stoking resentment of the French and creating martyrs for the Protestant cause. Limited toleration and the influence of exiled Scots and Protestants in other countries, led to the expansion of Protestantism, with a group of lairds declaring themselves Lords of the Congregation in 1557 and representing their interests politically. The collapse of the French alliance and English intervention in 1560 meant that a relatively small, but highly influential, group of Protestants were in a position to impose reform on the Scottish Church. A confession of faith, rejecting papal jurisdiction and the mass, was adopted by Parliament in 1560, while the young Mary, Queen of Scots, was still in France.

Knox, having escaped the galleys and spent time in Geneva as a follower of Calvin, emerged as the most significant figure of the period. The Calvinism of the reformers led by Knox resulted in a settlement that adopted a (partial) Presbyterian polity and rejected most of the elaborate trappings of the medieval Church. The reformed Kirk gave considerable power to local lairds, who often had control over the appointment of the clergy. There were widespread, but generally orderly outbreaks of iconoclasm. At this point the majority of the population was probably still Catholic in persuasion and the Kirk found it difficult to penetrate the Highlands and Islands, but began a gradual process of conversion and consolidation that, compared with reformations elsewhere, was conducted with relatively little persecution.

In the 1690s the Presbyterian establishment purged the land of Episcopalians and heretics, and made blasphemy a capital crime. Thomas Aitkenhead, the son of an Edinburgh surgeon, aged 18, was indicted for blasphemy by order of the Privy Council for calling the New Testament "The History of the Imposter Christ"; he was hanged in 1696. Their extremism led to a reaction known as the "Moderate" cause that ultimately prevailed and opened the way for liberal thinking in the cities.

=== 18th century ===
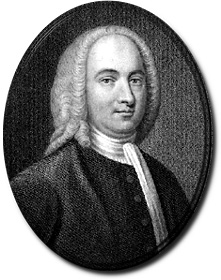
Ebenezer Erskine, whose actions led to the establishment of the Secession Church

The early 18th century saw the beginnings of a fragmentation of the Church of Scotland—which was reconstituted on a fully Presbyterian basis after the Glorious Revolution. These fractures were prompted by issues of government and patronage, but reflected a wider division between the hard-line Evangelicals and the theologically more tolerant Moderate Party. The battle was over fears of fanaticism by the former and the promotion of Enlightenment ideas by the latter. The Patronage Act 1711 was a major blow to the evangelicals, for it meant that local landlords could choose the minister, not the members of the congregation. Schisms erupted as the evangelicals left the main body, starting in 1733 with the First Secession headed by figures including Ebenezer Erskine. The second schism in 1761 lead to the foundation of the independent Relief Church. These churches gained strength in the Evangelical Revival of the later 18th century. a key result was the main Presbyterian church was in the hands of the Moderate faction, which provided critical support for the Enlightenment in the cities.

Long after the triumph of the Church of Scotland in the Lowlands, Highlanders and Islanders clung to an old-fashioned Christianity infused with animistic folk beliefs and practices. The remoteness of the region and the lack of a Gaelic-speaking clergy undermined the missionary efforts of the established Church. The later 18th century saw some success, owing to the efforts of the SSPCK missionaries and to the disruption of traditional society. Catholicism had been reduced to the fringes of the country, particularly the Gaelic-speaking areas of the Highlands and Islands. Conditions also grew worse for Catholics after the Jacobite rebellions and Catholicism was reduced to little more than a poorly-run mission. Also important was Scottish Episcopalianism, which had retained supporters through the civil wars and changes of regime in the 17th century. Since most Episcopalians had given their support to the Jacobite rebellions in the early 18th century, they also suffered a decline in fortunes.

=== 19th century ===
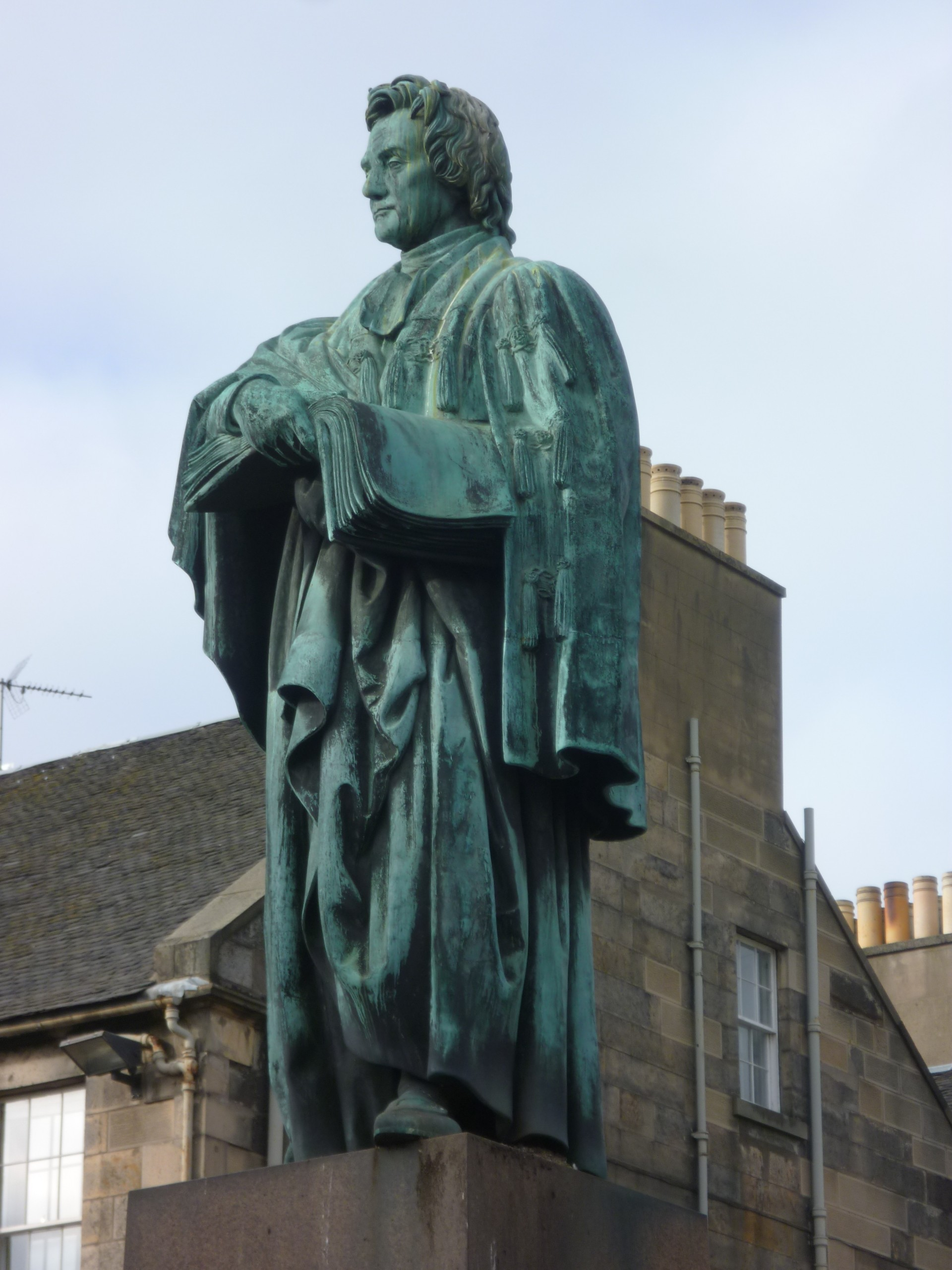
Thomas Chalmers statue in George Street, Edinburgh

After prolonged years of struggle, in 1834 the Evangelicals gained control of the General Assembly and passed the Veto Act, which allowed congregations to reject unwanted "intrusive" presentations to livings by patrons. The following "Ten Years' Conflict" of legal and political wrangling ended in defeat for the non-intrusionists in the civil courts. The result was a schism from the church by some of the non-intrusionists led by Dr Thomas Chalmers known as the Great Disruption of 1843. Roughly a third of the clergy, mainly from the North and Highlands, formed the separate Free Church of Scotland. The evangelical Free churches, which were more accepting of Gaelic language and culture, grew rapidly in the Highlands and Islands, appealing much more strongly than did the established church. Chalmers's ideas shaped the breakaway group. He stressed a social vision that revived and preserved Scotland's communal traditions at a time of strain on the social fabric of the country. Chalmers's idealised small equalitarian, kirk-based, self-contained communities that recognised the individuality of their members and the need for cooperation. That vision also affected the mainstream Presbyterian churches, and by the 1870s it had been assimilated by the established Church of Scotland. Chalmers's ideals demonstrated that the Church was concerned with the problems of urban society, and they represented a real attempt to overcome the social fragmentation that took place in industrial towns and cities.

In the late 19th century the major debates were between fundamentalist Calvinists and theological liberals, who rejected a literal interpretation of the Bible. This resulted in a further split in the Free Church as the rigid Calvinists broke away to form the Free Presbyterian Church in 1893. There were, however, also moves towards reunion, beginning with the unification of some secessionist churches into the United Secession Church in 1820, which united with the Relief Church in 1847 to form the United Presbyterian Church, which in turn joined with the Free Church in 1900 to form the United Free Church of Scotland. The removal of legislation on lay patronage would allow the majority of the Free Church to rejoin Church of Scotland in 1929. The schisms left small denominations including the Free Presbyterians and a remnant that had not merged in 1900 as the Free Church.

Catholic Emancipation in 1829 and the influx of large numbers of Irish immigrants, particularly after the famine years of the late 1840s, principally to the growing lowland centres like Glasgow, led to a transformation in the fortunes of Catholicism. In 1878, despite opposition, a Roman Catholic ecclesiastical hierarchy was restored to the country, and Catholicism became a significant denomination within Scotland. Episcopalianism also revived in the 19th century as the issue of succession receded, becoming established as the Episcopal Church in Scotland in 1804, as an autonomous organisation in communion with the Church of England. Baptist, Congregationalist and Methodist churches had appeared in Scotland in the 18th century, but did not begin significant growth until the 19th century, partly because more radical and evangelical traditions already existed within the Church of Scotland and the free churches. From 1879 they were joined by the evangelical revivalism of the Salvation Army, which attempted to make major inroads in the growing urban centres.

=== 20th and 21st centuries ===
In the 20th century existing Christian denominations were joined by other organisations, including the Brethren and Pentecostal churches. Although some denominations thrived, after World War II there was a steady overall decline in church attendance and resulting church closures for most denominations. Talks began in the 1950s aiming at a grand merger of the main Presbyterian, Episcopal and Methodist bodies in Scotland. The talks were ended in 2003, when the General Assembly of the Church of Scotland rejected the proposals. The religious situation was also altered by immigration, resulting in the growth of non-Christian religions. In the 2001 census 42.4 per cent of the population identified with the Church of Scotland, 15.9 per cent with Catholicism and 6.8 with other forms of Christianity, making up roughly 65 per cent of the population (compared with 72 per cent for Britain as a whole). Of other religions Islam was at 0.8 per cent, Buddhism, Sikhism, Judaism and Hinduism were all at around 0.1 per cent. Other religions together accounted for 0.6 per cent of respondents and 5.5 per cent did not state a religion. There were 27.5 per cent who stated that they had no religion (which compares with 15.5 per cent in Britain overall). Other more recent studies suggest that those not identifying with a denomination, or who see themselves as non-religious, may be much higher at between 42 and 56 per cent, depending on the form of question asked.

== Wales ==
=== Welsh Reformation ===
Bishop Richard Davies and dissident Protestant cleric John Penry introduced Calvinist theology to Wales. They used the model of the Synod of Dort of 1618–1619. Calvinism developed through the Puritan period, following the restoration of the monarchy under Charles II, and within Wales' Methodist movement. However few copies of Calvin's works were available before the mid-19th century. In 1567 Davies, William Salesbury, and Thomas Huet completed the first modern translation of the New Testament and the first translation of the Book of Common Prayer (Welsh: Y Llyfr Gweddi Gyffredin). In 1588 William Morgan completed a translation of the whole Bible. These translations were important to the survival of the Welsh language and had the effect of conferring status on Welsh as a liturgical language and vehicle for worship. This had a significant role in its continued use as a means of everyday communication and as a literary language down to the present day despite the pressure of English.

=== Nonconformity ===
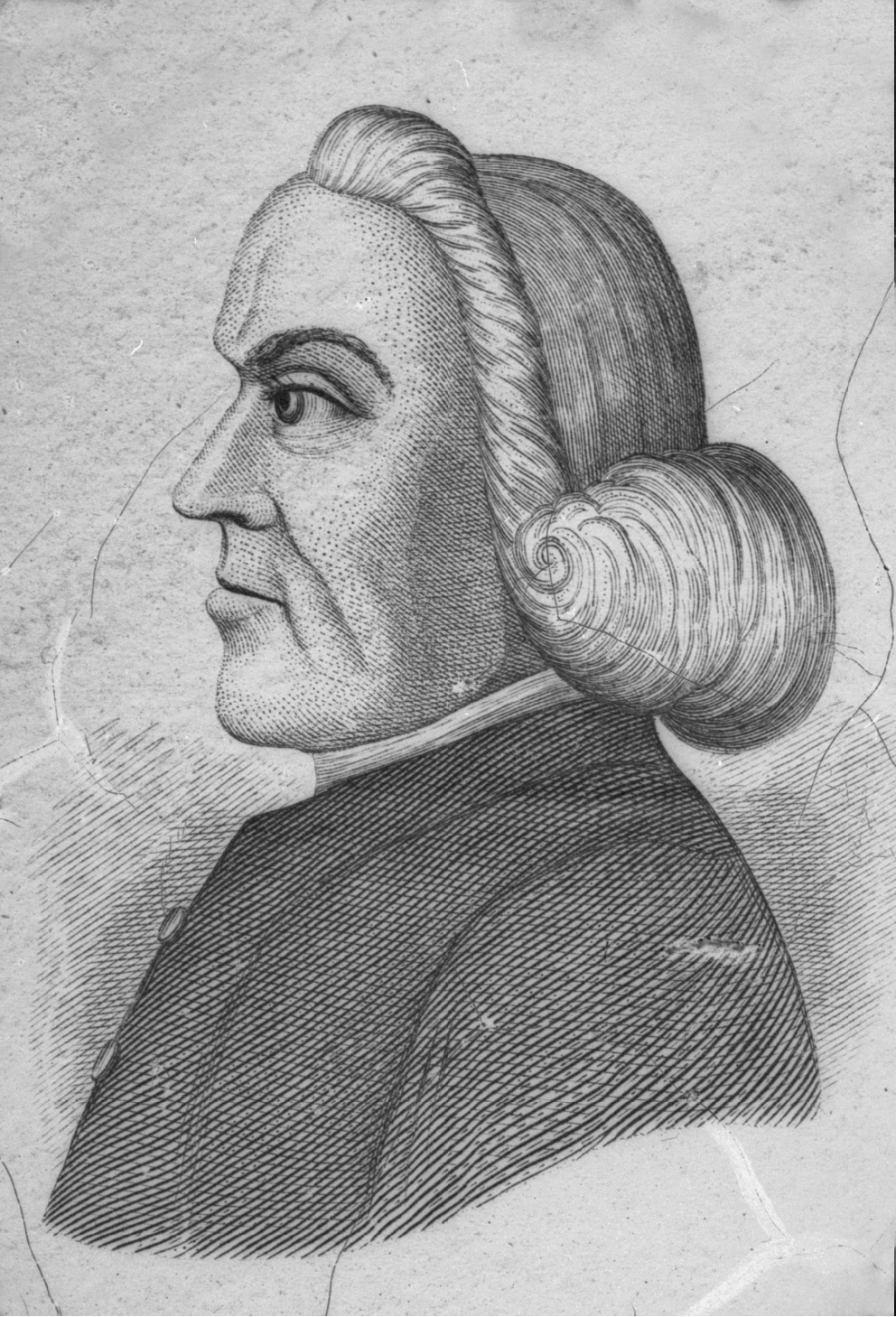
Howell Harris was one of the main leaders of the Welsh Methodist revival in the 18th century.

Nonconformity was a significant influence in Wales from the 18th to the 20th centuries. The Welsh Methodist revival of the 18th century was one of the most significant religious and social movements in the history of Wales. The revival began within the Church of England in Wales and at the beginning remained as a group within it, but the Welsh revival differed from the Methodist revival in England in that its theology was Calvinist rather than Arminian. Welsh Methodists gradually built up their own networks, structures, and even meeting houses (or chapels), which led eventually to the secession of 1811 and the formal establishment of the Calvinistic Methodist Presbyterian church of Wales in 1823.

The Welsh Methodist revival also had an influence on the older Nonconformist churches, or dissenters – the Baptists and the Congregationalists – who in turn also experienced growth and renewal. As a result, by the middle of the nineteenth century, Wales was predominantly a Nonconformist nation.

The 1904–1905 Welsh revival was the largest full scale Christian revival of Wales of the 20th century. It is believed that at least 100,000 people became Christians during the 1904–1905 revival, but despite this it did not put a stop to the gradual decline of Christianity in Wales, only holding it back slightly.

== Secularisation ==
Historians agree that in the late 1940s Britain was a predominantly Christian nation, with its religiosity reinforced by the wartime experience. Peter Forster found that in answering pollsters the English reported an overwhelming belief in the truth of Christianity, a high respect for it, and a strong association between it and moral behaviour. Peter Hennessy argued that long-held attitudes did not stop change; by mid-century: "Britain was still a Christian country only in a vague attitudinal sense, belief generally being more a residual husk than the kernel of conviction." Kenneth O. Morgan agreed, noting that: "the Protestant churches. Anglican, and more especially non-conformist, all felt the pressure of falling numbers and of secular challenges....Even the drab Sabbath of Wales and Scotland was under some threat, with pressure for opening cinemas in Wales and golf-courses in Scotland."

Harrison reports that the forces of secularisation grew rapidly, and by the 1990s Protestantism cast a thin shadow of its 1945 strength. Compared to Western Europe, Britain stood at the lower end of attendance at religious services, and near the top in people claiming ‘no religion’. While 80 per cent of Britons in 1950 said they were Christians, only 64 per cent did so in 2000. Brian Harrison states:

By every measure (number of churches, number of parish clergy, church attendance, Easter Day communicants, number of church marriages, membership as a proportion of the adult population) the Church of England was in decline after 1970. In 1985 there were only half as many parish clergy as in 1900. Also, while in the 2001 census still 72 per cent of British population identified as Christians, in 2011 only 59 per cent did so.

According to the 2018 British Social Attitudes Survey, which asks "Do you have a religion, and if so what is it?", Britain was majority irreligious. The 2021 United Kingdom census, which asks "What is your religion?", recorded lower numbers than the BSA for the non-religious, but also that Christianity had slipped below half the population.

== See also ==
- Religion in the United Kingdom
- Freedom of religion in the United Kingdom
- Religion in England, Scotland and Wales
- Anti-Catholicism in the United Kingdom
- Catholic Church in the United Kingdom
- Catholic schools in the United Kingdom
- Christianity in Cornwall
- Disestablishmentarianism
- English Covenant
- History of Christianity in Sussex
- Irreligion in the United Kingdom
- History of Christianity in Ireland
