= Three-point locking =

Door locking system

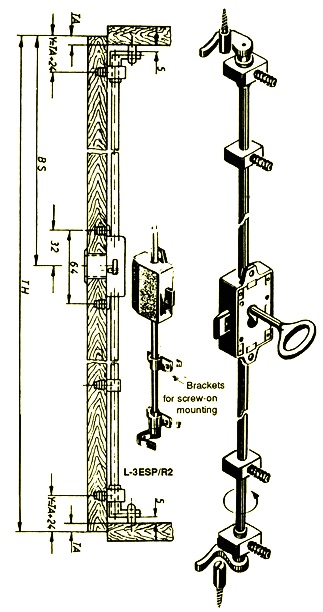
A schematic representation of three point lock.

Three-point locking, or a multipoint lock, is a locking system installed in cabinet or locker doors to enable more secure locking.

== Description ==
Whereas in single-point locking, the door on a cabinet locks only at the point where the key is turned, halfway up the edge of the door, three-point locking enables the top and bottom of the door to be simultaneously secured. This is accomplished by attaching two long steel rods to the lock on the inside of the door, which extend vertically upwards and downwards: when the lock is turned, the rotary movement of the latch on the inside of the door translates to vertical movement in these rods, with the result that the upper rod moves upwards by an inch or so, and the lower rod moves downwards similarly. This causes the ends of the rods to move through small holes in the flanges at the top and bottom of the door, resulting from the metal of the door being turned inwards, and the rods then move a short distance into holes in the metal surrounding the door. This effectively immobilizes the top and bottom of the door, and greatly increases the security of the door-locking compared to a door with only single-point locking.

Near the holes in the top and bottom of the door, some restraining device is provided for the rods to pass through, to prevent them from falling away entirely when in the unlocked position, and thus not inserted into the holes in the door. This consists of either a rubber or plastic gasket fitted into the holes in the door and protruding up or down a short distance, or else a small metal plate with a hole in it welded to the inside of the door through which the rod extends in any position.

Another three-point locking system is commonly used in lockers. This system uses a "Latch Channel" with 3 vertical slots that attach to 3 hooks on the locker frame. The locker handle is attached directly to the latch channel so that when the channel is lifted, it is released from the hooks and the door is allowed to swing open.

== Use ==
Three point lock are also commonly used in wardrobes, like from Hettich Single-point locking may provide adequate security for some situations on tiered lockers, as the doors are shorter, and therefore more difficult to force open; however, the taller doors of full length lockers and cabinets are more susceptible to the application of leverage. This is the reason three-point locking is usually found on single-tier lockers, and is certainly highly recommended in cases where it is optional.

This system is occasionally wrongly referred to as three-pin locking. This name is incorrect because only two pins or rods are involved, the third locking point being the latch itself inside the door.

In Australia, a locker or cabinet under certain weight limits cannot be legally used to store firearms unless it uses three-point locking and is bolted to either the floor or a wall.

== See also ==
- Rim lock
- Banbury lock
