= Burton, Nettleton =

Coordinates: 51.514°N 2.267°W

Burton
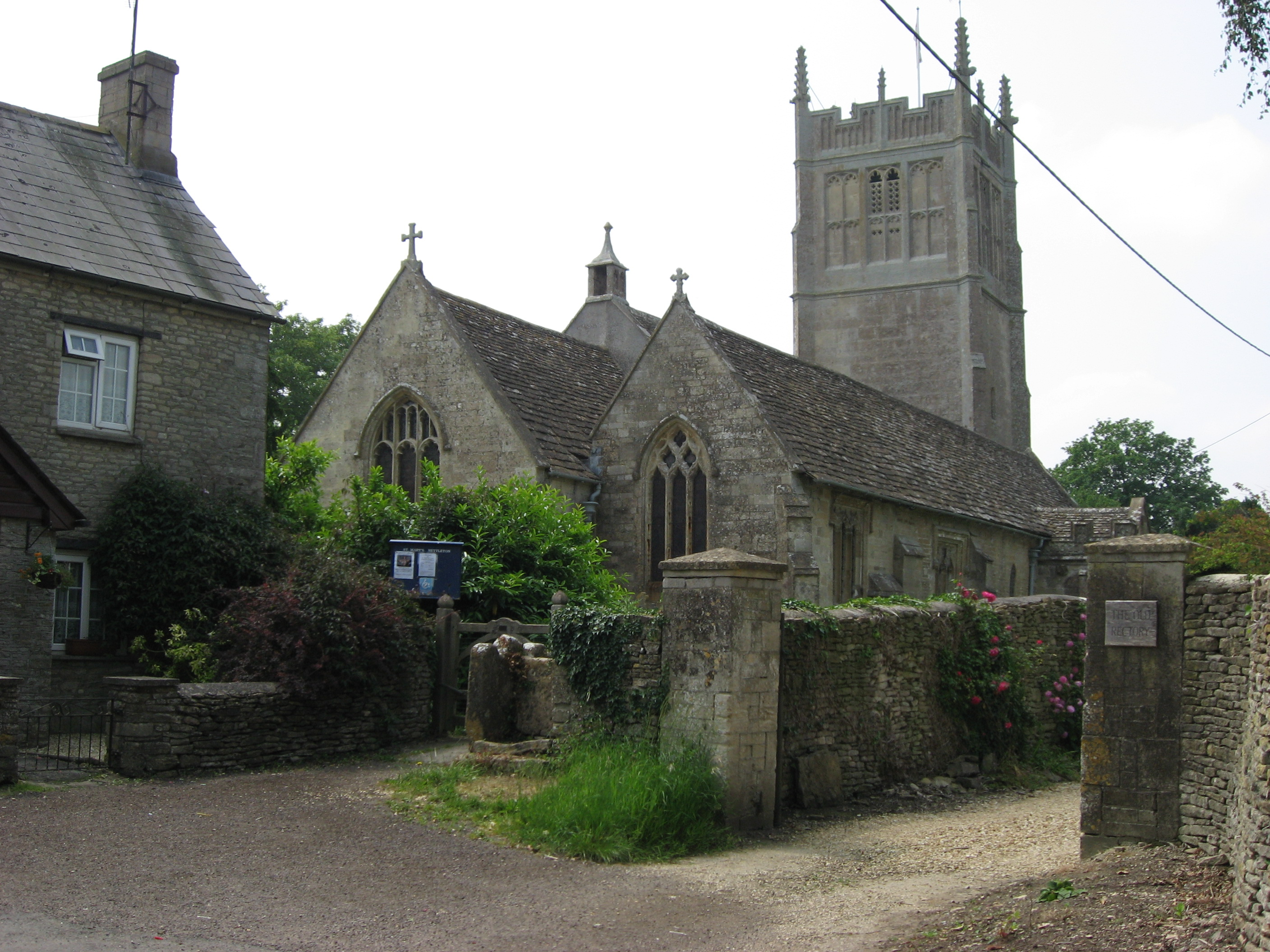
- St Mary's Church

- Location within Wiltshire
- OS grid reference: ST816795
- Civil parish: Nettleton
- Unitary authority: Wiltshire
- Ceremonial county: Wiltshire
- Region: South West
- Country: England
- Sovereign state: United Kingdom
- Post town: Chippenham
- Postcode district: SN14
- Dialling code: 01454
- Police: Wiltshire
- Fire: Dorset and Wiltshire
- Ambulance: South Western
- UK Parliament: South Cotswolds
- Website: Burton, Wiltshire

Burton is a small village in the Cotswolds Area of Outstanding Natural Beauty in Wiltshire, England. Kelly's 1915 Directory of Wiltshire identifies Burton as the most important part of the parish of Nettleton. It is about 8 miles (13 km) west of Chippenham.

== History ==
There is a record of Burton dating back to AD 1204, and more recently in Book 44 – Wiltshire, of the Topographical Collections of John Aubrey, 1659–70.

=== Causeway ===
An evaluation excavation in 2005 confirmed the presence of a causeway next to the top (east–west) section of Church Hill, comprising several phases of stone surfacing approximately 2.6m wide, built on to a 4m wide bank of redeposited natural clay. Although limited dating evidence was recovered, the causeway appears to have been in use by the 17th century, and may well be medieval in origin. The causeway seems likely to have been used until the construction of a dry-stone wall along its centre line in the 19th or 20th century. A possible early road surface extending beneath the modern lane was also identified and, although poorly dated, its construction and use appear to have been broadly contemporary with the causeway.

== St Mary's Church ==
The Church of St Mary the Virgin, which stands on the hill above the hamlet of Burton, is the oldest and most important building in the village, and is a Grade I listed building. The oldest parts of the church date from about 1290 although little remains from that period. The Register of Incumbents dates back to 1305 when the Abbot of Glastonbury presented Johannes de Montacute to the living. The Manor and Advowson of Netlington belonged, until the Dissolution, to Glastonbury Abbey. The church is part of the ByBrook Benefice in the rural deanery of Chippenham, archdeaconry of Malmesbury, and the present patron is the Bishop of Bristol.

The external walls of the nave and aisle date from the 14th century. In 1460 a general re-modelling of the church took place which included re-roofing the church, the building of the chancel and the erection of the north and south porches. The 15th-century tower is in the Somerset style and is similar to those nearby at West Kington and Yatton Keynell. At its base, the west doorway has a stone hood forming a shallow porch.

The north porch is ornate and richly vaulted within, and is surmounted externally by a panelled and battlemented parapet. On the cornice beneath are a number of grotesques to carry off the roof water: two at each side. A much-worn stoup for holy water is against the inner doorway. The door itself is the original one and still retains a large handle and escutcheon of the original ironwork. The door is fitted with a Banbury lock, the earliest form of church lock, in which the lock's metal components are separately fitted into a block of wood which forms the frame.

The south doorway is from the 13th century and has a canopied niche over the apex, with flanking buttresses in which are carved two small human figures. The priest's door is in the north wall of the chancel chapel, as the rectory is on this side of the church, and has over it externally a little projecting hood. Above the chancel arch is a stone sanctus bell-turret with panelled sides surmounted by a short broach spirelet with foliated finial. The ceiled wagon roof is tiled in Cotswold stone.

=== Interior ===
The earliest feature of the church is the circular Norman font, the lower part of which is formed like a scallop-capital with fish-scale ornamentation above.

The north aisle, which has three Georgian box pews, is a 14th-century copy of Norman work. Julian Orbach, updating Nikolaus Pevsner's guide, calls it "very odd". The arches of the nave rest on the round columns which have sculptured capitals, all of them different. Here is a fine array of thirty or forty figures and faces below the roof and on the arches. Most are human, with a few grotesques. Some of them are corbels holding up the roof. The bench table (stone bench) on the inside of the north wall probably dates from the 13th century.

Most of the ancient glass was destroyed by Oliver Cromwell's men in the Fanatique Tymes, as John Aubrey put it, but some fragmentary pieces remain in the north aisle windows, mainly heraldic forms. They show Royal Arms, Scrope, Badlesmere, Dunstanville and Paulet among others. The families represented were all at one time or another associated with the manor of Castle Combe, though the Paulet arms occur all over South and West England.

The 14th-century aisle terminated in line with the chancel arch. When the aisle was lengthened, the original three-light east window with reticulated tracery was reconstructed in the present 15th century east wall, and the square-headed three-light windows inserted in the north wall, and two in the south wall of the nave. Arthur Mee's description of the church in 1939 describes the nave as 'filled with box pews', but these have been reconstructed at some unknown date into pews of a normal height.

The Royal Arms over the chancel arch, which by law after the Restoration had to be displayed, is in the form used by the Georges until 1801. These were the last of the Royal Arms to display the Arms of France in the second quarter.

The pulpit is of stone, with 15th-century stone carving; the stone steps up to it are 600 years old. The altar is crowned with a late 19th-century reredos, which is a Doulton terracotta panel of the Last Supper by George Tinworth. The altar rails are 17th-century with vertically symmetrical balusters. There is a heraldic wall monument beside the altar with marks of lightning on it, to Samuel Arnold, a 19th-century rector for 40 years. Some restoration work was carried out in 1900 and again in the 1970s when a fire destroyed much of the work just finished. Repairs were again completed a year later.

In 2009, the pews and pew platform were removed in the west end of the church, and a new stone floor laid over the earth floor underneath. This revealed that one of the beams supporting the pew platform was very old, hand carved and part painted – possibly part of the rood screen that many churches had before the Protestant Reformation.

The church possesses several pieces of silver, including a flagon, chalice, paten and paten cover, most of which date from the 17th and 18th century. Memorials include a brass commemorating the eight men of the parish who died while serving in the First World War.

=== Bells ===
The tower holds six bells which were restored and rehung by John Taylor & Co of Loughborough on a new steel frame in 1982 below the old wooden frame, displacing the old ringing chamber, thus the bells are now rung from the base of the tower. The tenor bell is c.1410, from the Worcester foundry; two others are 17th-century.

The tenor bell has an unusual border. Ornamental borders of foliage or arabesques between the words or on other parts of the bell are hardly ever found on mediaeval bells. The only other instances in an English church are believed to be on the tenor at Hereford Cathedral (about 1450), and a bell at Bintry, Norfolk (about 1530).

=== In the churchyard ===
There are 24 listed monuments in the churchyard, all chest tombs with a Grade II listing. Also here is the war grave of Private Edwin Kent, who lived at The Gib while employed by a Burton coal merchant until he enlisted in the 2nd Wiltshire in January 1915. He died in October of that year, aged 32, after being wounded during an advance in Flanders, and was given a military funeral.

In the churchyard are also the graves of Captain John Russell Compton Domvile (1856–1893) and Eva Kathleen Domvile (1868–1897), children of Reverend Charles Compton Domvile (1816–1898) who was Rector of St Mary's. This branch of the Domvile family is descended from Charles Pocklington Esquire MP who succeeded his Uncle Sir Compton, and took the name and arms of Domville.

== Notable buildings ==
St Mary's Church is the only Grade I listed building in the parish.

Burton Farmhouse, now known as The Old Farmhouse, is at the bottom of Church Hill, and is a Grade II listed building from the late 17th or early 18th century. The former Plume of Feathers inn, since 2000 a house known as The Old Plume, is from the same period and also Grade II listed.

Another old building is Chestnut Cottage, which used to be the village forge. Part of the Old Rectory, now a private house, dates from 1605, although in common with the other old buildings it has been substantially extended and altered over the generations.

== Amenities ==
The modern community has an active Anglican church, St Mary's, and a public house, The Old House at Home. It is served by two nearby Church schools, Bybrook Valley CofE School in Yatton Keynell (4 miles away) and Trinity CofE School in Acton Turville (1 mile).

The Burton Community Association was founded in 2014 and is a registered charity. It has built and maintains a children's play area; it provides a defibrillator and volunteers trained in its use and in CPR; it has a group which organises activities to maintain and improve the village appearance; and a community safety and crime prevention group which operates a Community Speed Watch scheme and supports the work of the police.
