= Lugbury Long Barrow =

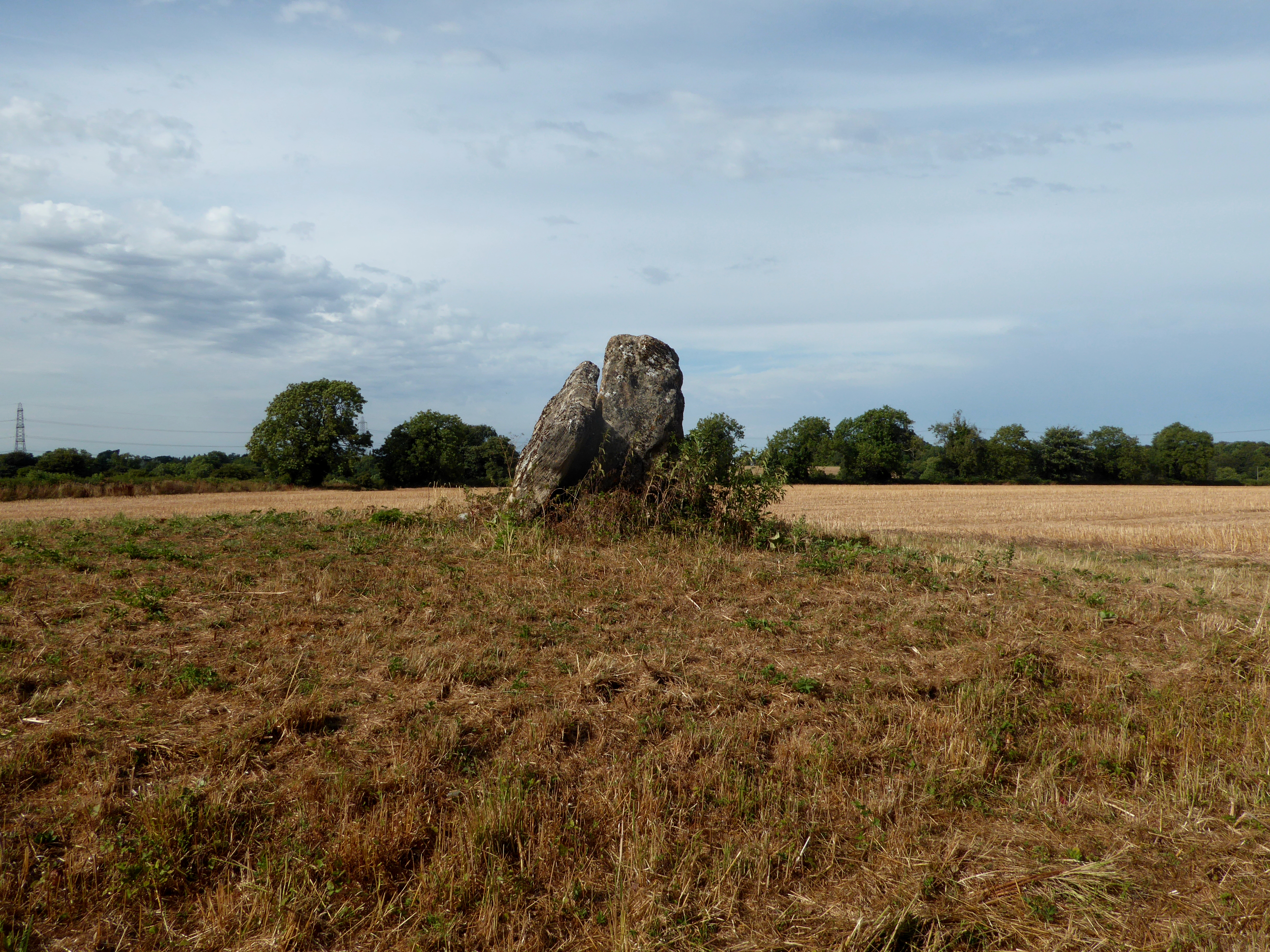
- The long barrow in 2018

- Location in England, United Kingdom
- 51°30′20.520″N 2°14′43.188″W
- Type: Long barrow
- Periods: Early Neolithic
- Location: England, United Kingdom
- OS grid reference: ST 83069 78559

History
- Built: c. 3700 BC

Site notes
- Material: Stone

Scheduled monument
- Designated: 10 August 1923
- Reference no.: 1010397

Lugbury Long Barrow is a prehistoric long barrow in Wiltshire, England, about 0.6 miles (1 km) east of Nettleton and about 1 mile (1.6 km) north-west of Castle Combe. The site, excavated in the 19th century, is a scheduled monument.

== Description ==
The monument is one of many long barrows in Dorset, Hampshire and Wiltshire. Dating from the early to middle Neolithic periods, they are the burial places of early farming communities.

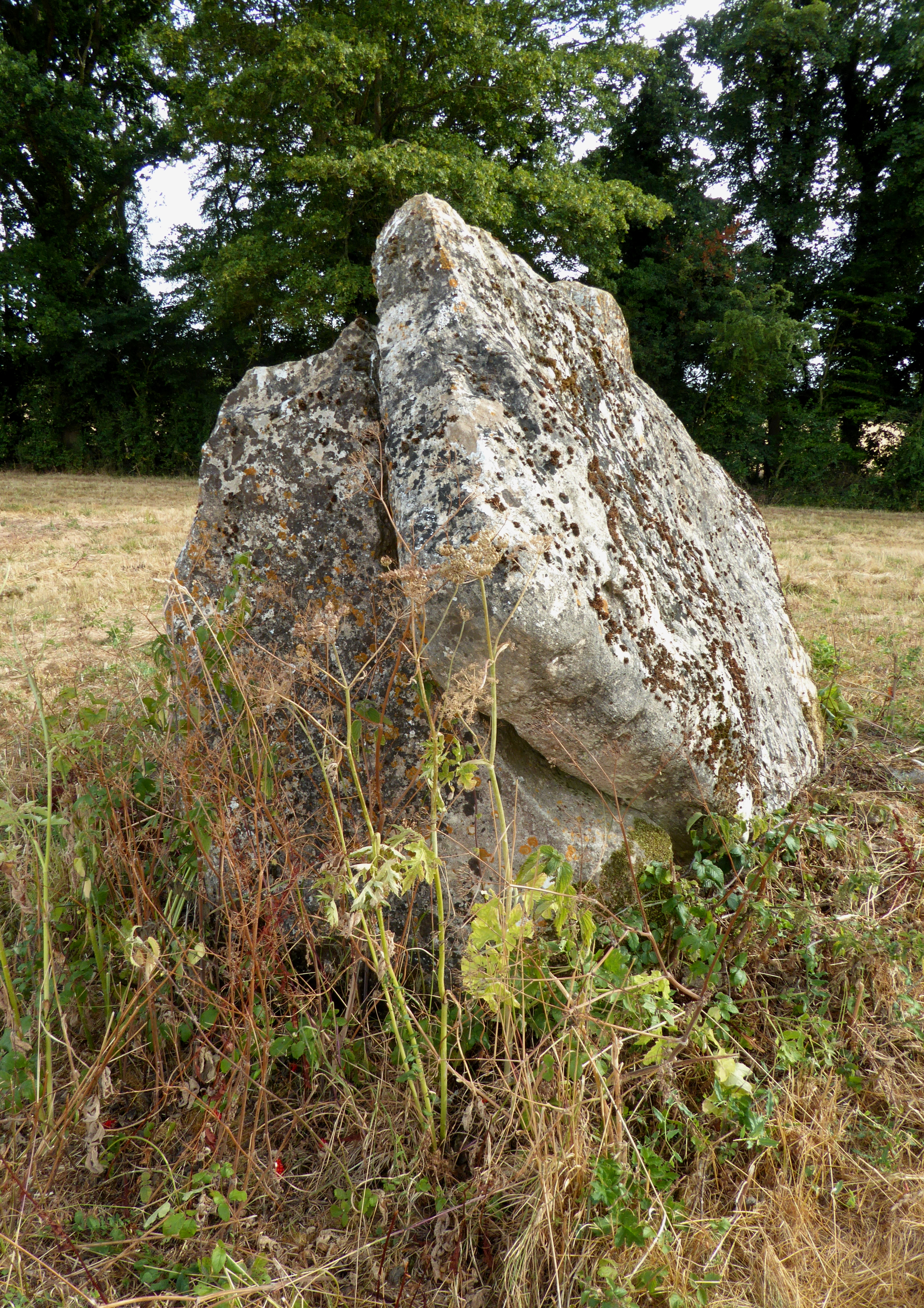
the northern side

The mound, on level ground, is orientated west–east. The size of the mound before excavation is thought to have been about 209 by 78 feet (64 by 24 m). Flanking ditches north and south of the barrow, from which material for the mound was originally taken, have been filled in over the years. Towards the eastern end are the remains of a chamber: a capstone, about 12 by 6 feet (3.7 by 1.8 m), leaning against two upright stones (all of limestone), which formed the false entrance portal to the mound.

=== Excavation ===
It was partially excavated in 1821 by Richard Hoare. He made a trench along the barrow, and found near the eastern end at ground level the skeleton of a young man in a crouched position.

George Scrope excavated the site from 1854 to 1855, and a report was written by John Thurnam. Four burial chambers were found, three of which contained a total of twenty-six skeletons of adults and children of both sexes. Some flint flakes were found.
