= Nettleton, Wiltshire =

Village and civil parish in Wiltshire, England

Coordinates: 51.506°N 2.259°W

Nettleton
- Location within Wiltshire
- Population: 693 (2011 census)
- OS grid reference: ST8278
- Civil parish: Nettleton
- Unitary authority: Wiltshire
- Ceremonial county: Wiltshire
- Region: South West
- Country: England
- Sovereign state: United Kingdom
- Post town: Chippenham
- Postcode district: SN14
- Dialling code: 01249
- Police: Wiltshire
- Fire: Dorset and Wiltshire
- Ambulance: South Western
- UK Parliament: South Cotswolds
- Website: Parish Council

Nettleton is a village and civil parish about 6.5 miles (10.5 km) northwest of Chippenham in Wiltshire, England. The parish includes the villages of Burton and West Kington, and the hamlets of Horsedown, Nettleton Shrub and West Kington Wick. The northern section of Nettleton village is known as Nettleton Green.

Until 1934, Burton and Nettleton were separate parishes.

== Geography ==
The eastern limit of the parish is the boundary with the county of Gloucestershire. The Burton Brook and Broadmead Brook flow through the north and south of the parish respectively, meeting to form the Bybrook River on the eastern boundary of the parish. Nettleton Mill, an ancient watermill which was part of the Castle Combe estate, is on the Broadmead Brook at the southeastern boundary of the parish. The Fosse Way runs through the parish, crossing both brooks.

== History ==
Lugbury Long Barrow is a chambered long barrow about 0.75 miles (1.2 km) east of the village. Excavations in the 19th century found 28 human skeletons in its chambers.

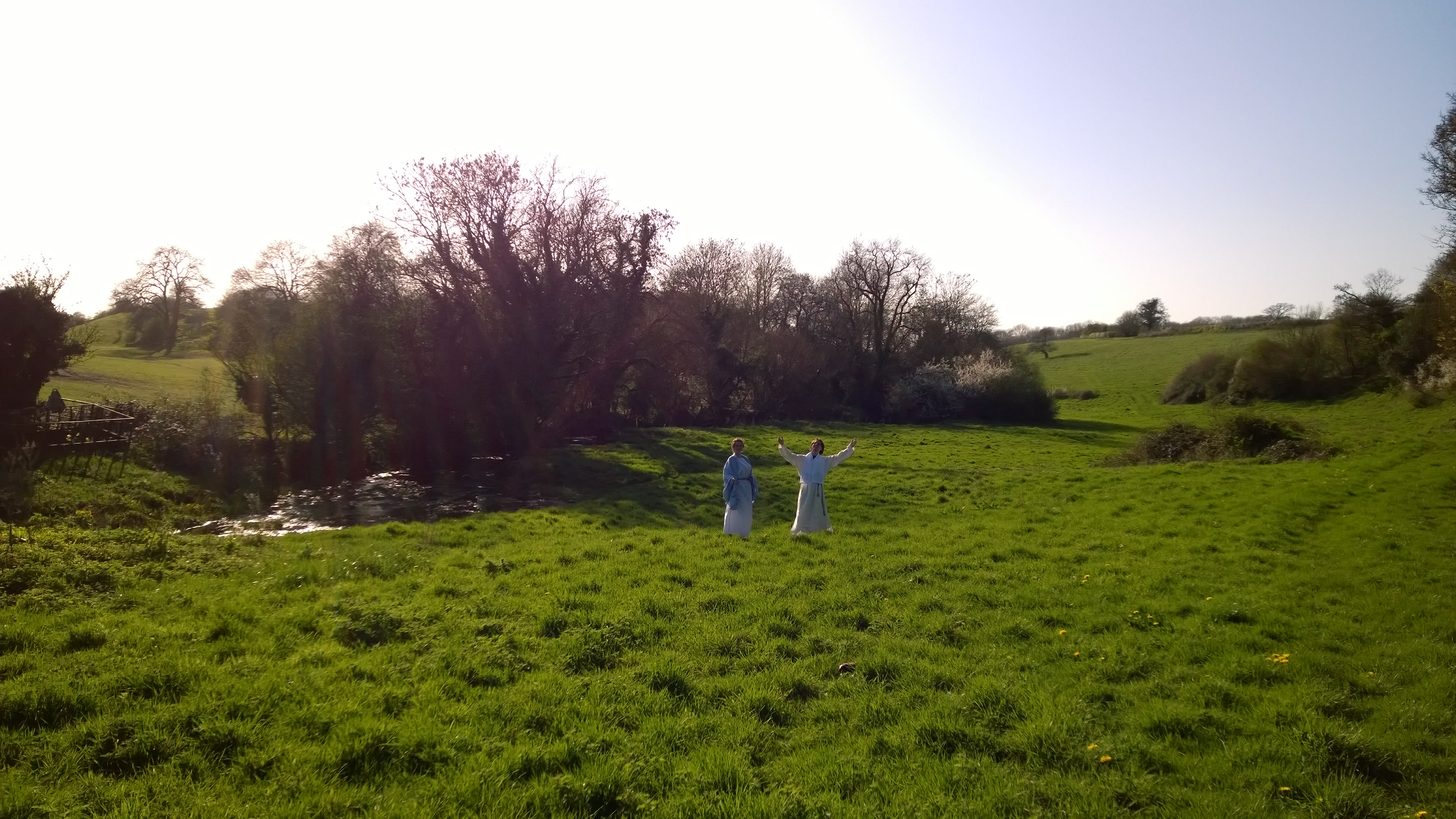
Priest and priestess on the site of the entrance to the shrine complex at Nettleton Scrubb

Remains of a Romano-British settlement of about 30 buildings have been found in the north-west of the parish, where the Fosse Way crosses the Broadmead Brook, south-west of Brotton Hill wood. This was excavated between 1956 and 1971; it is now field and woodland again. It was interpreted as a religious site, including an octagonal shrine some 10 metres in diameter. Apollo Cunomaglus may have been its overall patron; dedications to other deities, probably including Diana, Mercury, and Mars with his Gaulish consort Rosmerta, were also found.

Domesday Book recorded 24 households in 1086.

== Religion ==
Nettleton has had a Baptist chapel since 1823.

The parish church is St Mary's at Burton; West Kington has a church of St Mary the Virgin. The benefice of Littleton Drew (in Grittleton civil parish) was united with Nettleton in 1960. Today the parish is served by the Bybrook Team Ministry.

== Sources ==
- Pevsner, Nikolaus; Cherry, Bridget (revision) (1975). The Buildings of England: Wiltshire. Harmondsworth: Penguin Books. pp. 355–356. ISBN 0-14-071026-4.
- Wedlake, W.J. (1982). The Excavation of the Shrine of Apollo at Nettleton, Wiltshire, 1956-71. Society of Antiquaries of London. ISBN 0-85431-233-1.
