= Single-point locking =

System for locking doors

Single-point locking is a locking system in cabinet doors where locking takes places only at the point halfway up the edge of the door, where the latch engages with the doorjamb. The term is most often used in items like lockers, where it is contrasted with the much more secure three-point locking, which uses movable rods to secure the top and bottom of the door when the door is locked, and the term is not normally used in situations where single-point locking is the only option normally found.

Typically, box lockers (that is, with 4 or more tiers) use single-point locking, unless they are ordered with three-point locking as an optional extra, whereas full-length (single-tier) lockers most often come with three-point locking as standard. The reason for this is that, for some situations, single-point locking is considered adequately secure with smaller doors, because those are not as easy to force open as larger doors of otherwise-similar design. High-security models of tiered lockers, along with being constructed of thicker steel, may also have three-point locking, however many tiers are involved.

In Australia, cabinets cannot be legally used for storing firearms if they have only single-point locking—three-point locking is required by law, as part of the crackdown on gun storage after the Port Arthur massacre in Tasmania.
