= Locker =

Storage compartment

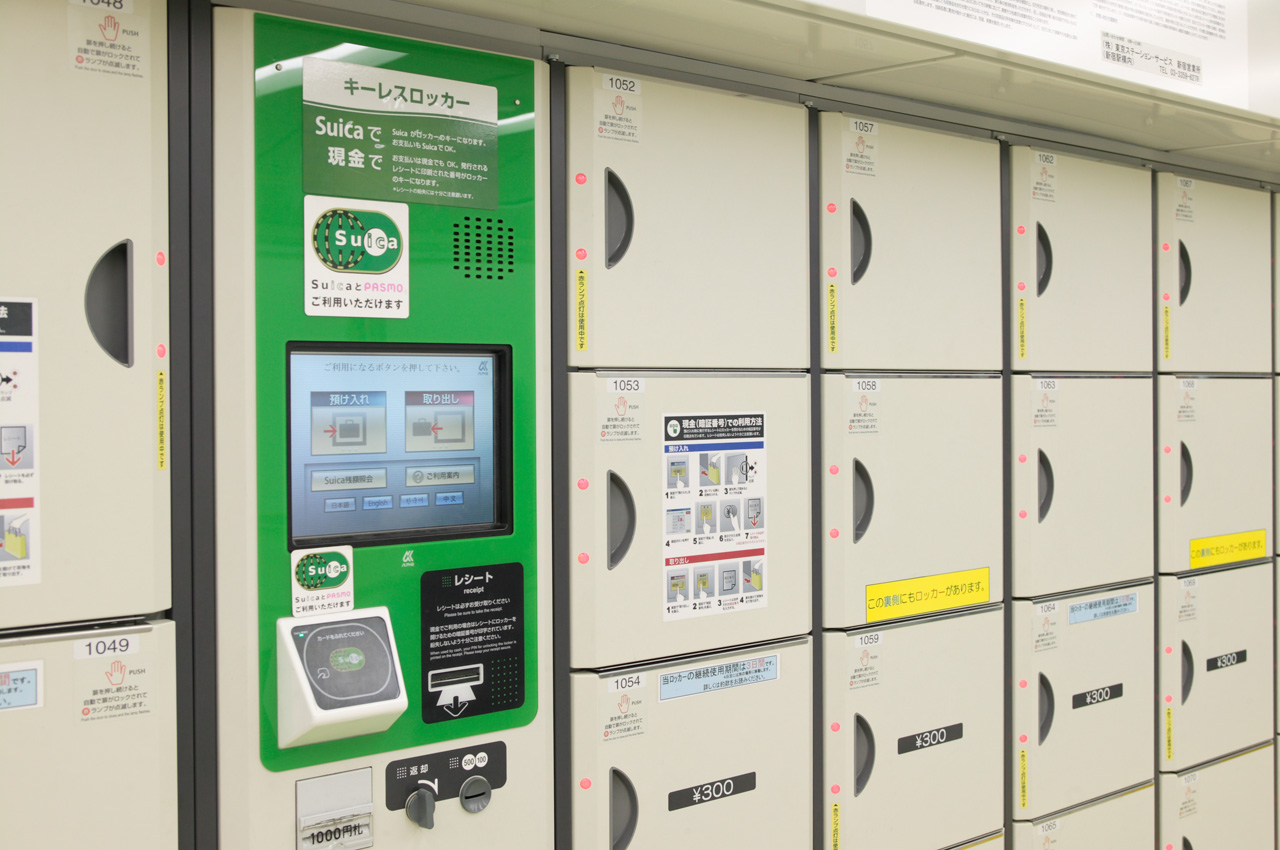
Keyless lockers (Japan)

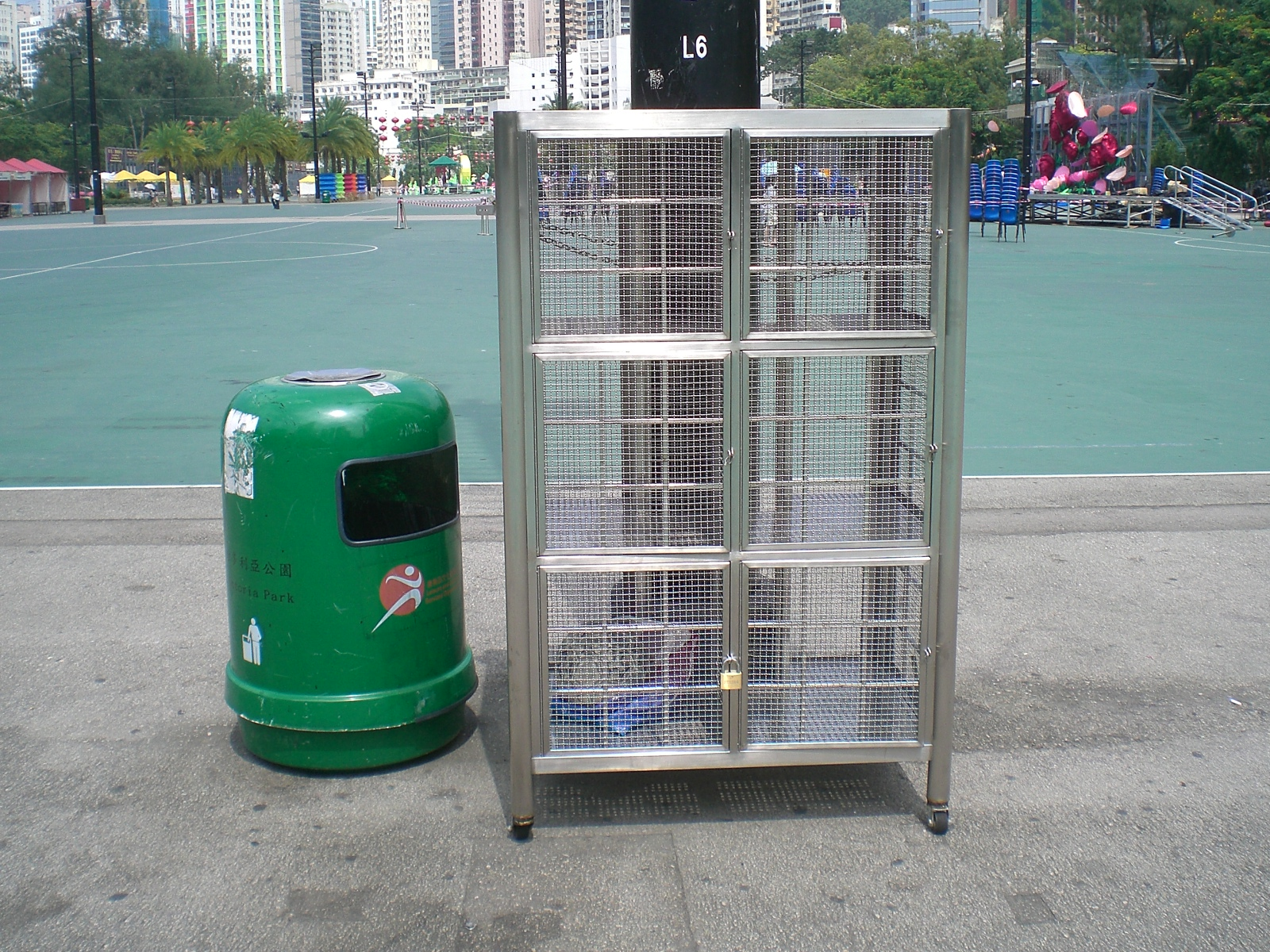
Lockers made of metal (Victoria Harbour, Hong Kong)

A locker is a small, usually narrow storage compartment. They are commonly found in dedicated cabinets, very often in large numbers, in various public places such as locker rooms, workplaces, schools, transport hubs and the like. They vary in size, purpose, construction, and security.

== General description and characteristics ==
Lockers are normally quite narrow, of varying heights and tier arrangements. Width and depth usually conform to standard measurements, although non-standard sizes are occasionally found. Public places with lockers often contain large numbers of them, such as in a school. They are usually made of painted sheet metal.

The characteristics that usually distinguish them from other types of cabinet or cupboard or storage container are:

- They are usually equipped with a lock, or at least a facility for padlocking (occasionally both).
- They are usually intended for use in public places, and intended for the short- or long-term private use of individuals for storing clothing or other personal items. Users may rent a locker for a single use or for a period of time for repeated use. Some lockers are offered as a free service to people partaking of certain activities that require the safekeeping of personal items.
- There are usually, but not always, several of them joined.

Lockers are usually physically joined side by side in banks, and are commonly made from steel, although wood, laminate, and plastic are other materials sometimes found. Steel lockers which are banked together share side walls, and are constructed by starting with a complete locker; further lockers may then be added by constructing the floor, roof, rear wall, door, and just one extra side wall, the existing side wall of the previous locker serving as the other side wall of the new one. The walls, floors, and roof of lockers may be either riveted together (the more traditional method) or, more recently, welded together.

Locker doors usually have some kind of ventilation to provide for the flow of air to aid in cleanliness. These vents usually take the form of a series of horizontal angled slats at the top and bottom of the door, although sometimes parallel rows of small square or rectangular holes are found instead, running up and down the door. Less often, the side or rear walls may also have similar ventilation.

Locker doors usually have door stiffeners fixed vertically to the inside of the door, in the form of a metal plate welded to the inner surface, and protruding outward a fraction of an inch, thus adding to the robustness of the door and making it harder to force open.

Lockers are often manufactured by the same companies who produce filing cabinets, stationery cabinets (occasionally wrongly referred to as lockers), steel shelving, and other products made from sheet steel.

== Variable characteristics of lockers ==
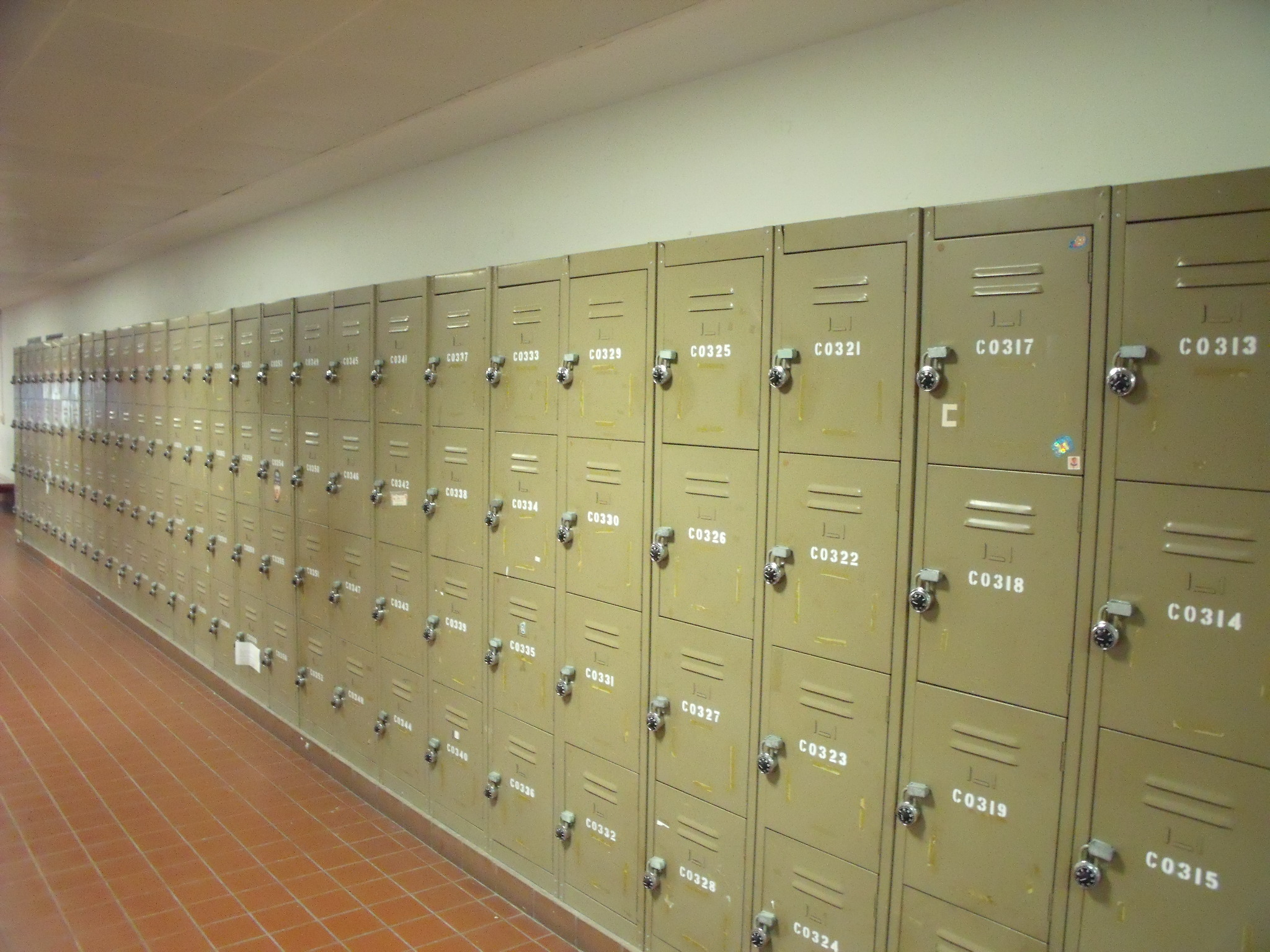
School lockers found in National University of Singapore, Singapore.

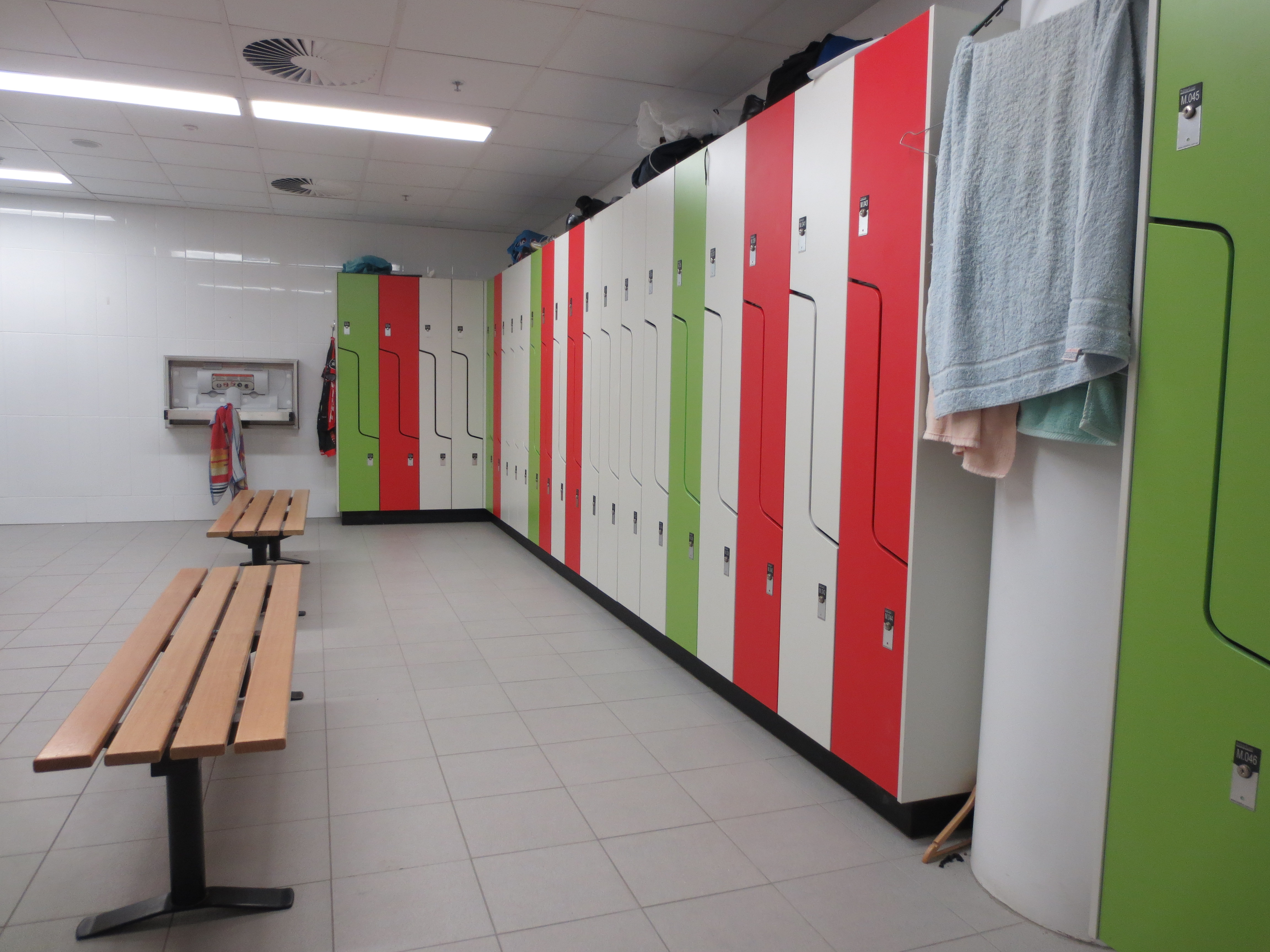
Change room lockers

There are a number of features or characteristics which may vary in lockers. Because purchasers will need to specify what they want in each of these when ordering, it is more common to order a particular configuration rather than buy "off the shelf" in a shop, although certain very common configurations can be found in shops fairly easily. These features include:

- Bank size: It does not necessarily refer to the total number of compartments, but rather the number of compartments wide the entire cabinet is. So a bank of three may contain six lockers, for example, if they are two-tier lockers. In short, the total number of lockers is the bank size multiplied by the number of tiers. Sometimes the term "bay" is used instead of "bank", although "bank" appears to be the more standard term; on other occasions, "bay" refers to a single locker width within a bank, including all tiers of locker directly on top of each other.
- Tiers: may be specified as single-tier (full height), two-tier, three-tier, etc., meaning that the lockers are stacked on top of each other in layers two high, three high, etc. Tiers are commonly up to eight high; on occasion, even more tiers may be found, in the case of very small lockers for such purposes as storing laptop computers. The most common numbers of tiers found in lockers are, in order, one, two, and four; three-tier lockers are rather less common, and other numbers such as five, six, or eight even less common still - seven almost non-existent. Since locker cabinets are most commonly 6 feet (182.9 cm.) high (although there are exceptions), the height of individual lockers varies according to how many tiers are accommodated within the cabinet. The height of individual lockers is usually approximately 6 feet (182.9 cm.) divided by the number of tiers, so that two-tier lockers are about 3 feet (91.4 cm.) high, three-tier lockers 2 feet (61 cm.) high, four-tier lockers 1.5 feet (45.7 cm.) high, and so on. Standard features often vary according to the number of tiers: single-tier lockers usually include a shelf about a foot (roughly 30 cm.) from the top, and a hanging rail (sometimes with one or two hooks) immediately underneath that, at the top of the large compartment beneath the shelf; two- or three-tier lockers usually lack the shelf, but include the hanging rail; lockers with four or more tiers usually have none of these fittings, but consist of just the bare compartment.
- Material: steel is the traditional material; but wood, plastic, or laminate are sometimes used. Plastic or laminate lockers are sometimes advocated in environments, such as near swimming pools, where moisture accumulation may cause steel lockers to rust over time. They can also be used in external applications where internal space is not available.
- Locking options: various types of key locking or padlocking facility are available now. Key locking options include flush locks, cam locks, or locks incorporated into a rotating handle; padlocking facilities may be a simple hasp and staple, or else a padlocking hole may be included in a handle, often called a latchlock. More modern designs include keyless operation, either by coin deposit (which may or may not be returned when use of the locker terminates), or by using electronic keypads to enter passwords for later reopening the locker. Some older lockers used a drop-latch which was incorporated into the door handle, and slid up and down and could be padlocked at the bottom in the "down" position, but these are less used now. Three-point locking is not possible with this type of latch, because it needs to be operated by means of a latch that rotates rather than slides up and down; so this drop-latch is probably a less secure locking option, which may be why it is little used nowadays.
- Number of locking points: Locker doors may lock with either single- or three-point locking, but this is not normally chosen as a separate option, and the choice is usually dependent on the number of tiers in the lockers, or whether they are a high-security model, although some manufacturers do allow purchasers to specifically choose an option here that goes against their normal practice. Single-point locking locks the door at only the point where the latch engages with the door-frame, whereas three-point locking uses extensible steel rods to lock the top and bottom of the door as well.
- Dimensions: (Note that, in English-speaking countries, even those commonly using metric measurements now, locker dimensions are usually clean numbers of inches or feet, while the corresponding metric measurements are uneven, involving decimal places when precision is required, presumably resulting from continued use of locker designs based on feet and inches, unchanged for decades other than for cosmetic features.):
  - Width: Lockers are usually designed in standard widths: 12 inches (30.5 cm.) wide is a common width, and 15 inches (38 cm.) has become more common recently. Other widths are occasionally found, however, especially in the U.S., where narrower or (occasionally) wider lockers can be found.
  - Depth: Most standard lockers are approximately 18 inches (46 cm.) deep, so this property does not usually vary, unless a non-standard model is chosen, or arranged by special order. In the U.S., 12- or 15-inch-deep (30.5 or 38 cm.) lockers seem to have some currency, although this is virtually unknown in Australia.
  - Height: Similarly, locker cabinets are a standard height, usually about 6 feet (182.9 cm.), so this does not vary either, unless non-standard models are ordered.
- Colour: lockers were often a uniform dark-grey some decades ago, but a range of colors is offered by most manufacturers now. A few manufacturers offer two-tone coloring, where the doors and locker bodies are of different colors.
- Steel thickness: lockers tend to be made from a standard thickness of steel, which is commonly 0.8 mm. thick; but heavy-duty or high-security lockers are offered as a standard option by some manufacturers, or may be available on special order. A typical locker of this sort may be constructed from steel 1.2 mm. thick, for example, and is usually fitted with three-point locking, regardless of the number of tiers.
- Sloping tops: while most lockers have flat tops, some manufacturers offer the option of sloping tops. The slope may be either 30 degrees or 45 degrees to the horizontal, sloping towards the front. The purpose of this is to make it impossible to store items on atop the lockers, or to make it harder for dust or other debris to accumulate there. This is an important factor in places like food-processing factories or restaurants where hygiene requirements must be met.

== The evolution of lockers ==
Historically, lockers have been a space to store personal belongings secured by various locking mechanisms. The earliest modern lockers were simple 'box with a lock' type device likely used for sporting purposes. The 'locker room' was a place for athletes to store their clothing, belongings and equipment temporarily. People could retrieve their items by using their specific key assigned to them when they selected the locker space. As lockers became more commonplace, they started appearing in educational facilities, hospitals, gymnasiums and in the workplace.

Lockers initially were cabinet-like and made of wood and later made of steel and metal. Lockers have since evolved with peoples needs and breakthrough technologies. Today lockers can be manufactured out of various materials and to suit the décor of the environment they are in. Metal, steel, plastic, wood and fabricated wood are all popular materials that are used.

The lock mechanism on a locker has especially evolved with the induction of new technologies. The movement from a large padlock and key to an electronic system, illustrates how lockers have adopted smart technology. Smart technology allows lockers to be digital, flexible in use and equipped with various features to improve the user experience.

Smart lockers are digitally managed storage banks which makes the experience of acquiring and using a locker fast and efficient. Whether it's controlled by a mobile phone app or a touchless kiosk, the technology allows for automation throughout the entire process/workflow.

== Types and applications ==
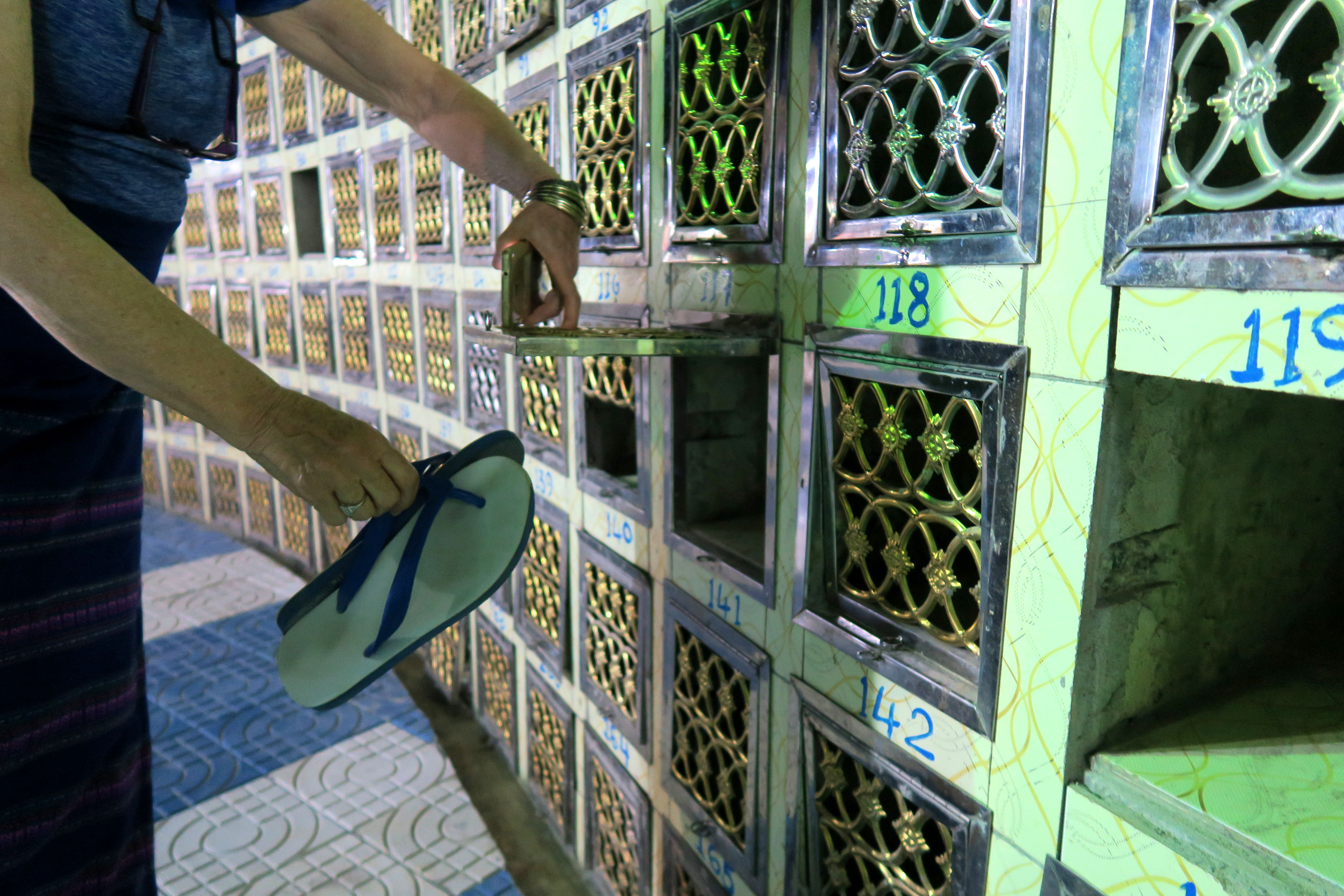
Shoes locker in Jade Pagoda (Amarapura, Mandalay).

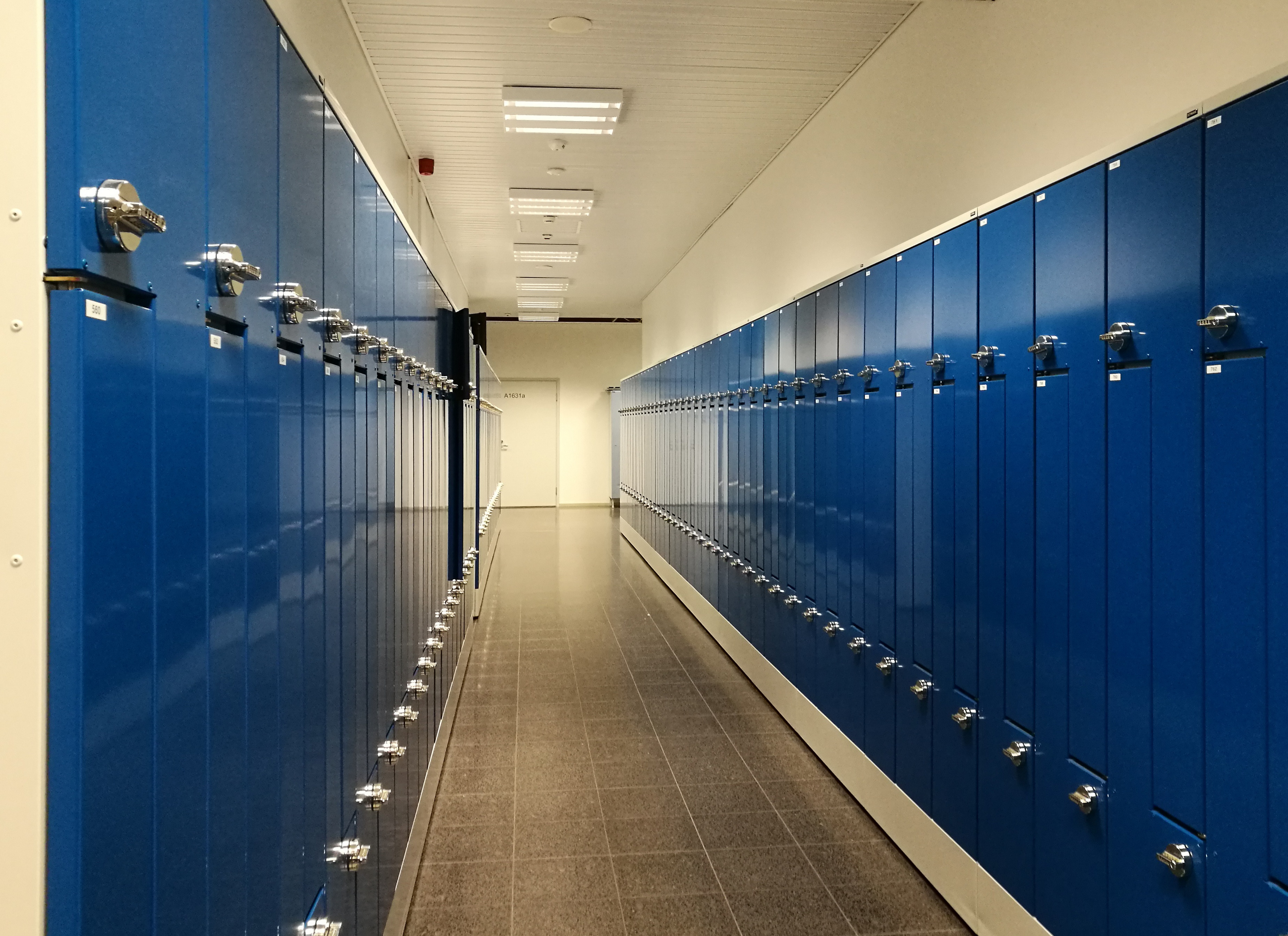
School lockers at the Pohjankartano School in Oulu, North Ostrobothnia, Finland

=== Traditional lockers ===
There are a number of less standard lockers that are offered by various manufacturers. These include:

- Gun lockers or safes are specifically designed for the secure storage of guns and ammunition. They broadly resemble normal single-tier lockers, but tend to be slightly less high than normal single-tier lockers, and are often free-standing, and not banked together. They are fitted with internal racks designed for holding firearms. They have a shelf at the top like normal single-tier lockers, although in this case it is closed and locked by a separate door, because of legal requirements in some countries that firearms and ammunition be stored and locked separately. They always lock with three-point locking, which is in some countries a legal requirement for the storage of firearms. Sometimes they are made of the standard kind of sheet steel used in manufacturing normal lockers, and sometimes they are made of extremely thick heavy-duty steel and in this case resemble a safe more than a normal locker. In Australia there are strict regulations governing the storage of firearms following the Port Arthur massacre in Tasmania, Australia on 28 April 1996, and cabinets used for storing firearms must be bolted to the floor or a wall if the cabinet is under a certain weight. Dedicated gun lockers are likely to include holes in the cabinet to accommodate such bolting. Several locker manufacturers also offer dedicated gun lockers.
- Bicycle lockers are usually in outdoor locations near railway stations and the like where people may want to store bicycles securely. They are often banked together, with individual lockers shaped like an isosceles triangle for efficient and compact storage of a bicycle. This triangular shape permits the lockers to be grouped either in a radial pattern (with the sharpest points of the lockers together), or in a row in alternating orientations.
- Heavy-duty or high-security lockers are similar to the standard models, but are usually made from thicker steel, and have three-point locking, regardless of the number of tiers involved. Some models are made from steel 1.2 mm. thick, in contrast to the more usual 0.8 mm.
- Laundry lockers are used in places like hospitals and food-processing workplaces where uniforms have to be collected, laundered, then returned to their owners. The locker cabinet contains a number of very narrow lockers, each of whose doors is keyed using a key held by the owner, so that they have access only to their own locker; but the entire array of doors is embedded in a much larger door covering the entire front of the cabinet. Opening this opens all the lockers simultaneously, and requires the use of a master key which is held by whoever collects items deposited in lockers, for laundering, then returned in the same way, after which they items are accessible to owners using their individual small doors.
- Services lockers are extra-wide lockers used by fire or police services, and typically have a number of different compartments within a single door to accommodate different pieces of equipment used by fire or police personnel, such as special shelves to accommodate helmets, boots, and so on.
- School lockers may be single- or two-tier, and are fitted with internal divisions or shelves to accommodate both hanging space and room for storing textbooks.
- Perforated lockers are similar to the standard types of locker, but the door and walls are made largely or entirely of perforated steel, with hundreds of holes creating a strong mesh arranged in a diagonal pattern. This is used where good ventilation is required, or where, for security reasons, it is necessary that the contents can be examined visually while the doors are locked.
- Clean/dirty lockers normally have two or three parts within the locker. One part is meant for dirty or clothes that are worn, and the other side for clean clothes. These lockers are meant for hospitals or other medical workplaces where it is useful to keep work and personal clothes apart to reduce the risk of infection. These lockers are also useful for factories where work clothes can become dirty and it can be very useful to keep them apart from personal clothes.
- Backpacker lockers are designed to accommodate backpacks in places like backpackers' hostels, and are similar to two-tier lockers, but with larger dimensions. Typically, the height may be standard, but the width and depth will be several inches bigger. These usually lack internal fitting such as shelves, hanging railes, or hooks.
- Stepped/2-step lockers are two-tier lockers, usually available only in 15-inch (38-cm.) width; but the compartments and their doors have an L-shaped cross-section, which causes the division between the doors to follow a zigzag pattern. This configuration enables more hanging height to be included in both upper and lower lockers; but part of each compartment (the lower part of the upper one and the upper part of the lower one) will be only half the usual width of two-tier lockers.
- Executive lockers are larger units, not banked but free-standing, that include several compartments, including a full wardrobe-type hanging compartment, as well as a number of other smaller compartments for varied uses.
- Coin Operated Lockers are meant for temporary use when guests need a place to store valuables while having fun. They are commonly seen in amusement parks.
- TA-50 military gear lockers are widely used by the US Department of Defense as personnel lockers. They can be made of several locker materials but usually are made of steel or wire mesh. The term TA-50 refers to any type of military equipment, so the sizes and configurations are generally based on the type of equipment stored.
- Division 10 — Specialties Lockers: Division 10 — Specialties is a category within the National Master Specification (NMS) set of guidelines developed by Public Works and Government Services Canada. Division 10 — Specialties items that could be required within a locker room (to meet commercial building and construction regulations) are lockers, washroom accessories, toilet compartments, and toilet partitions. Lockers are constructed of two sides: a back, top and a bottom. Different types of materials are used in locker manufacturing, offering a wide variety of metal lockers, stainless steel lockers, solid plastic lockers, solid phenolic lockers, and custom lockers. A padlock is the most common way to lock a locker; however, you can also use a keyed cylinder lock, built in combination locks or keypad locks. There are a lot of optional extras that can be utilized for lockers, for example: bases, sloping tops, end panels, customized shelves and hooks as well as the locking method (coin-operated lockers are another option). The environment is the best way to distinguish what type of locker will be required for which type of space. For example, if you are putting gym lockers into a humid area, or anywhere close to showers, stainless steel or solid plastic lockers would be most suitable because they are moisture-resistant and rust-resistant. Wood lockers would not be appropriate for this type of environment because the moisture from the humidity might rot the wood. Zinc-coated steel may also be used to reduce rusting.
- Waterproof lockers: These are designed to receive wet items, installed in changing rooms of swimming pools, gyms etc.
- Mini lockers: Mini storage lockers are smaller than normal, we can store books, albums, seasonal clothing, tools, and small appliances.

=== Smart Lockers ===
After the COVID-19 pandemic of 2019, office workers only went into offices for part of their working week for social distancing. Hybrid working, defined as "team or organisation work part of their time at the workplace and part remotely", has made the workplace more flexible.

With the rise of hybrid working, traditional lockers no longer serves the purpose for a modern workplace that empowers its people. Smart lockers is a new term that used for an agile workplace, where employee experiences are being prioritised while saving office space and cost. Several companies, such as Yellowbox, design smart locker systems aimed at supporting such workplace models through cloud-based management dashboards, automated user onboarding and allocation, and locker access through workplace apps and identity/access control credentials.

== Doorless designs ==
There are also several types of doorless locker design including those that are cylindrical, spherical and cone-shaped. One such design eliminates the use of doors by offering a cylinder open at the front to receive items and can then be rotated to secure the contents.

== Abolition of lockers ==
Some schools in the United States have been reported to have abolished the use of lockers. Security concerns are cited as the reason for this, with the concern being that lockers may be used to store contraband such as weapons, drugs or pornographic material. There has been some controversy over in what circumstances school authorities or law-enforcement officials are permitted to search lockers, with or without informing the users, or with or without the users being present at the time of the search, and it has been considered a civil liberties issue, particularly in the U.S.

Other advocates of lockerless schools also cite reasons such as reducing noise by eliminating the clang of dozens of locker doors, or creating a more appealing environment aesthetically. It has also been claimed that removing lockers provides good training for students by forcing them to be more efficient in managing their books, and taking the time to plan what books they will need, and carrying only those ones.

In schools without lockers, students are sometimes provided with two complete sets of textbooks, one set being kept at school for use in class, and the other being kept at home for referring to for homework, thus limiting the amount of heavy carrying that would otherwise be required without having lockers to store them in between classes. However, research has shown an increase in the incidence of back injuries in some students, which has been directly attributed to the lack of lockers for storing books in, thus forcing students to spend more time carrying heavy loads of books in backpacks.

Some students oppose the abolition of lockers, arguing that their locker is one of the few private spaces they have in an environment which is otherwise communal and impersonal.

Coin-operated public luggage lockers can be present in bus stations and rail stations. In some countries they were commonplace from the 1950s to the 1970s, but eliminated for concern that bombs may be hidden in them. Some airports have also removed them for this reason.
