= West Kington =

Village in Wiltshire, England

Coordinates: 51.4941°N 2.2762°W

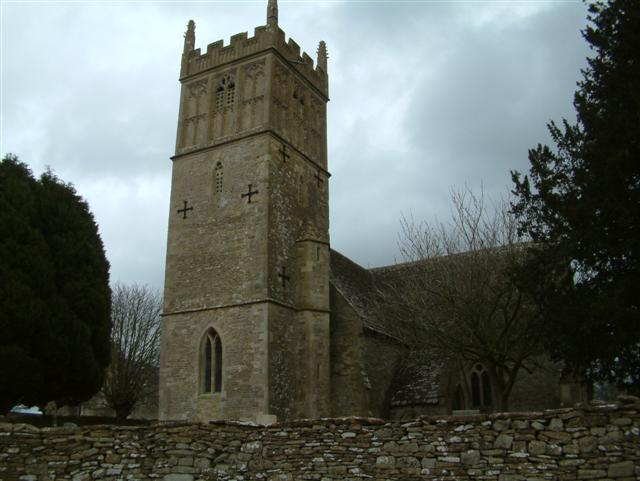
- St Mary the Virgin parish church

- Location within Wiltshire
- OS grid reference: ST809778
- Civil parish: Nettleton
- Unitary authority: Wiltshire
- Ceremonial county: Wiltshire
- Region: South West
- Country: England
- Sovereign state: United Kingdom
- Post town: Chippenham
- Postcode district: SN14
- Dialling code: 01249
- Police: Wiltshire
- Fire: Dorset and Wiltshire
- Ambulance: South Western
- UK Parliament: South Cotswolds

West Kington is a village in the civil parish of Nettleton, in Wiltshire, England. The village lies in the steeply wooded valley of the Broadmead Brook, a source of the Bybrook River, and is close to the county boundary with Gloucestershire. It is 6 miles (10 km) southeast of the Gloucestershire market town of Chipping Sodbury. In 1931 the parish had a population of 225. On 1 April 1934 the parish was abolished and merged with Nettleton. The hamlet of West Kington Wick is 0.6 miles (0.97 km) southeast of the village at grid reference ST 8163 7665.

== Buildings ==
The Church of England parish church of St Mary the Virgin has a 13th and 15th century west tower. The rest of the church was rebuilt in 1856 to designs by the architect S.B. Gabriel of Bristol. It is Grade II* listed.

The farmhouse called Latimer Manor dates from the 16th century and is also Grade II* listed. It is believed to be named after Hugh Latimer, who had the living of West Kington in the early 16th century.

== Notable people ==
Hugh Latimer, later Bishop of Worcester, was vicar of West Kington church from 1531, prior to the controversy in the reformation which led to his martyrdom in Oxford.

Television producer Dilys Breese retired to the village and is buried there.

== In popular culture ==
The music video for the song "The Safety Dance" by the Canadian band Men Without Hats was filmed in West Kington in the summer of 1982.
