= Cunomaglus =

Cunomaglus ("Hound Lord") is the epithet of a Celtic god identified with Apollo.

A temple at Nettleton Shrub in Wiltshire was dedicated to Apollo Cunomaglus, existing shortly after 69 AD, after which it developed into a major cult centre: a large shrine, hall, hostel, shops, and priest's house were built, demonstrating the wealth and popularity of the cult. Diana and Silvanus were also worshipped there, suggesting that Cunomaglus may have been a god of hunting. It is also possible the shrine may have been a healing sanctuary, since Apollo's main role as a Celtic god was as a healer, the site is close to water, and finds such as tweezers and pins may denote the presence of a curative cult.

The god's name is attested on an inscription found at the temple site in 1958. It reads: deo Apol|lini Cuno|maglo Co|rotica Iu|ti fil(ia) v(otum) s(olvit) l(ibens) m(erito)

== See also ==
- Romano-Celtic temple
