= Banbury lock =

Early form of church lock

The Banbury lock is an early form of church lock, in which the metal components of the lock are separately fitted into a block of wood which forms the frame.

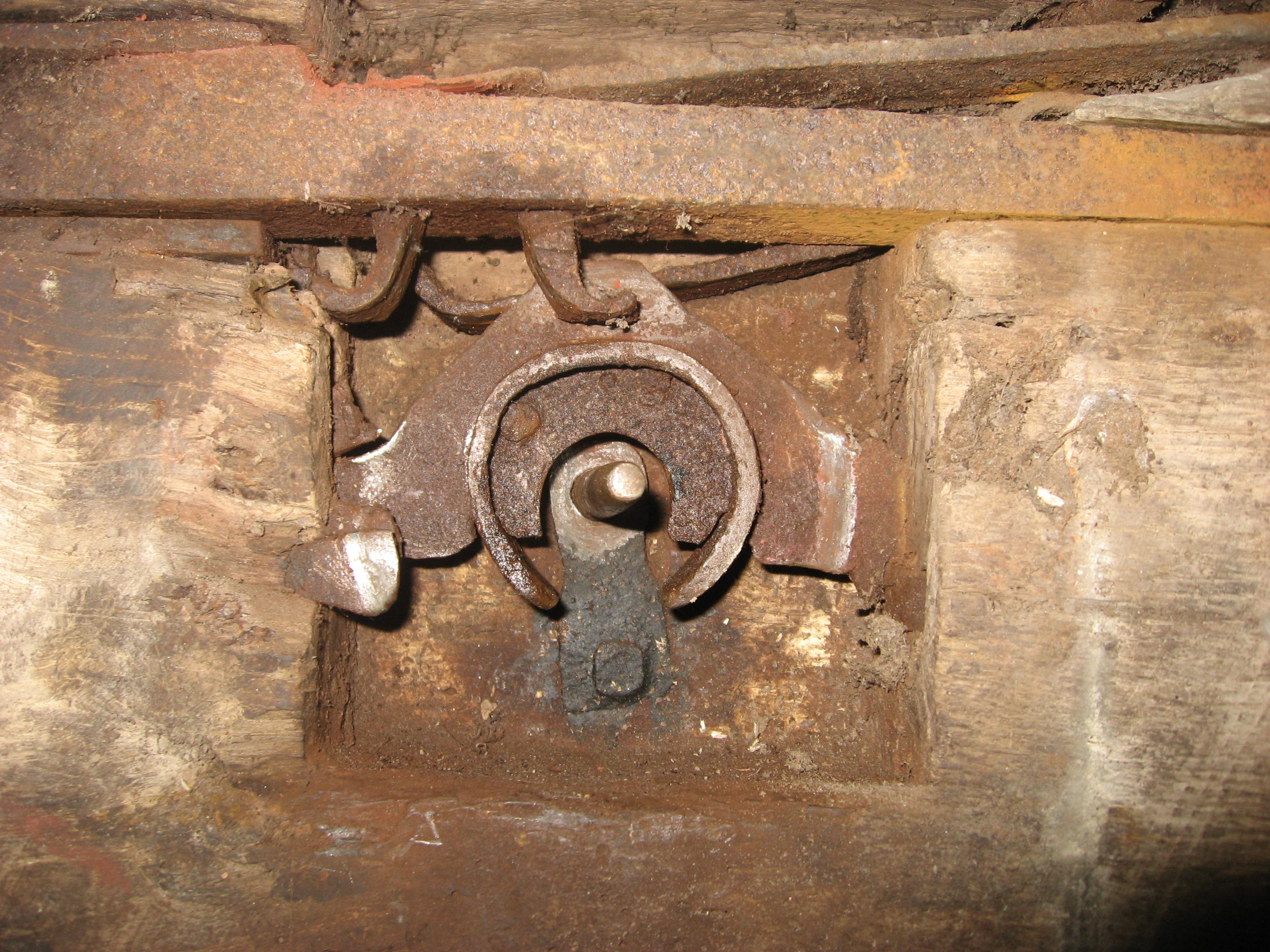
The Banbury lock on the main door of the Church of St Mary the Virgin, Burton, Wiltshire, England
