= Yatton Keynell =

Village in Wiltshire, England

Coordinates: 51.486°N 2.193°W

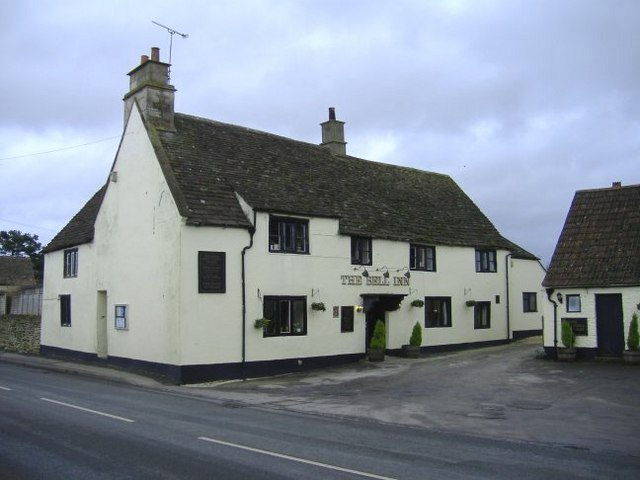
- The Bell Inn, Yatton Keynell, in 2007

- Location within Wiltshire
- Population: 825 (in 2011)
- OS grid reference: ST867764
- Unitary authority: Wiltshire
- Ceremonial county: Wiltshire
- Region: South West
- Country: England
- Sovereign state: United Kingdom
- Post town: CHIPPENHAM
- Postcode district: SN14
- Dialling code: 01249
- Police: Wiltshire
- Fire: Dorset and Wiltshire
- Ambulance: South Western
- UK Parliament: South Cotswolds
- Website: Community

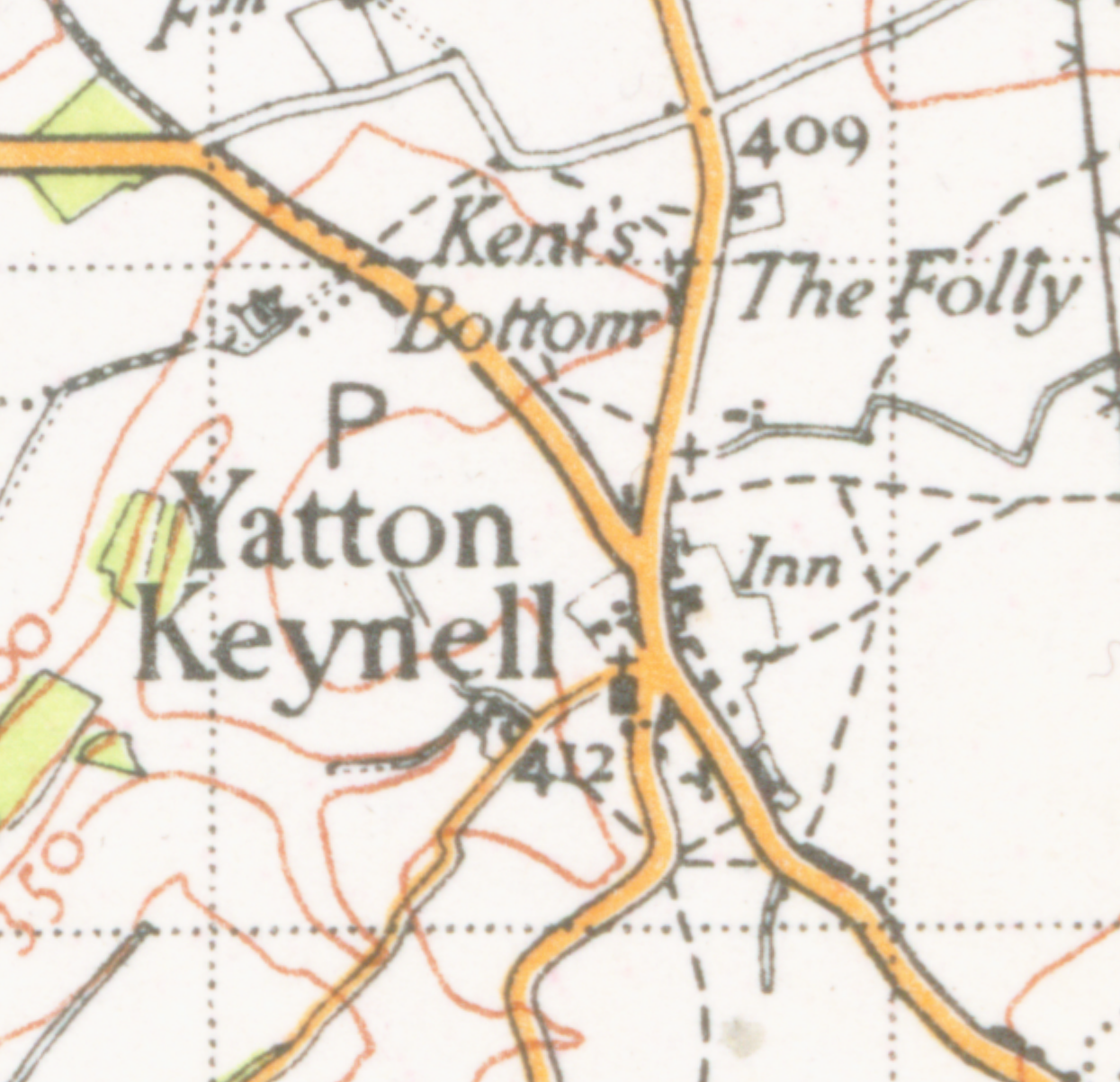
A 1946 map of Yatton Keynell

Yatton Keynell (pronounced "kennel") is a village and civil parish in Wiltshire, England. The village is on the B4039 road near Castle Combe, about 4 miles (6 km) northwest of Chippenham, and about the same distance to the east of the county border with South Gloucestershire.

The parish includes the hamlets of Broomfield, Giddeahall, Long Dean, Tiddleywink and West Yatton. The Bybrook River forms part of the western parish boundary.

The economy of the parish was historically agricultural although it is now more of a residential area for surrounding towns; its population in the first census of 1801 was 353 and by 2001 reached 745, rising further to 825 at the 2011 census. Yatton Keynell village is surrounded by a green belt and is largely a conservation area.

== History ==
The village was mentioned in Domesday Book as Getone; there were three estates, one of them having a mill, and the combined population was 16 households. Its name went through several variations, and the "Keynell" appears to have been added in the 13th century after Henry Caynell, who had a landholding in 1242. At about this time, the family gave a tract of land to Stanley Abbey, and the village became a grange of the abbey.

The Manor House is dated 1659 and is Grade II* listed. The rubble stone house has a three-gabled front and was owned by the Snell family from the early 17th century. It is to the west of the modern village, on the road from the church to West Yatton.

The village pub, "The Bell", takes its name from being opposite the church and dates from the 17th century. In 1764, deeds show its name as "The Old Inn" and mention outhouses, stables, a brew house, garden and orchard, remains of which are still visible. The adjacent road, now the B4039 to Castle Combe and beyond, was a toll road and there was a tollbooth close by as recently as 1871.

A farmhouse, called Park Farmhouse, on Grittleton Road is dated to 1778 but was once known as "Small Pox Farm" and was possibly once an isolation house.

Ebenezer Baptist Chapel was built in 1835 and became a Congregational church in the 1870s.

An unusual milestone in the roadside wall of the rectory garden has a cast-iron plaque showing the distance to Hyde Park Corner, London, as 97 miles, and to Sodbury as 11 miles; the milestone is Grade II listed.

The nearby hamlet of Tiddleywink made national news in 2003 following a campaign by residents to get it officially recognised on maps.

== Geography and geology ==
The limestone grassland found in the parish is more characteristic of the Cotswolds than of Wiltshire. The village and the western part of the parish lie within the southern tongue of the Cotswolds Area of Outstanding Natural Beauty.

== Parish church ==
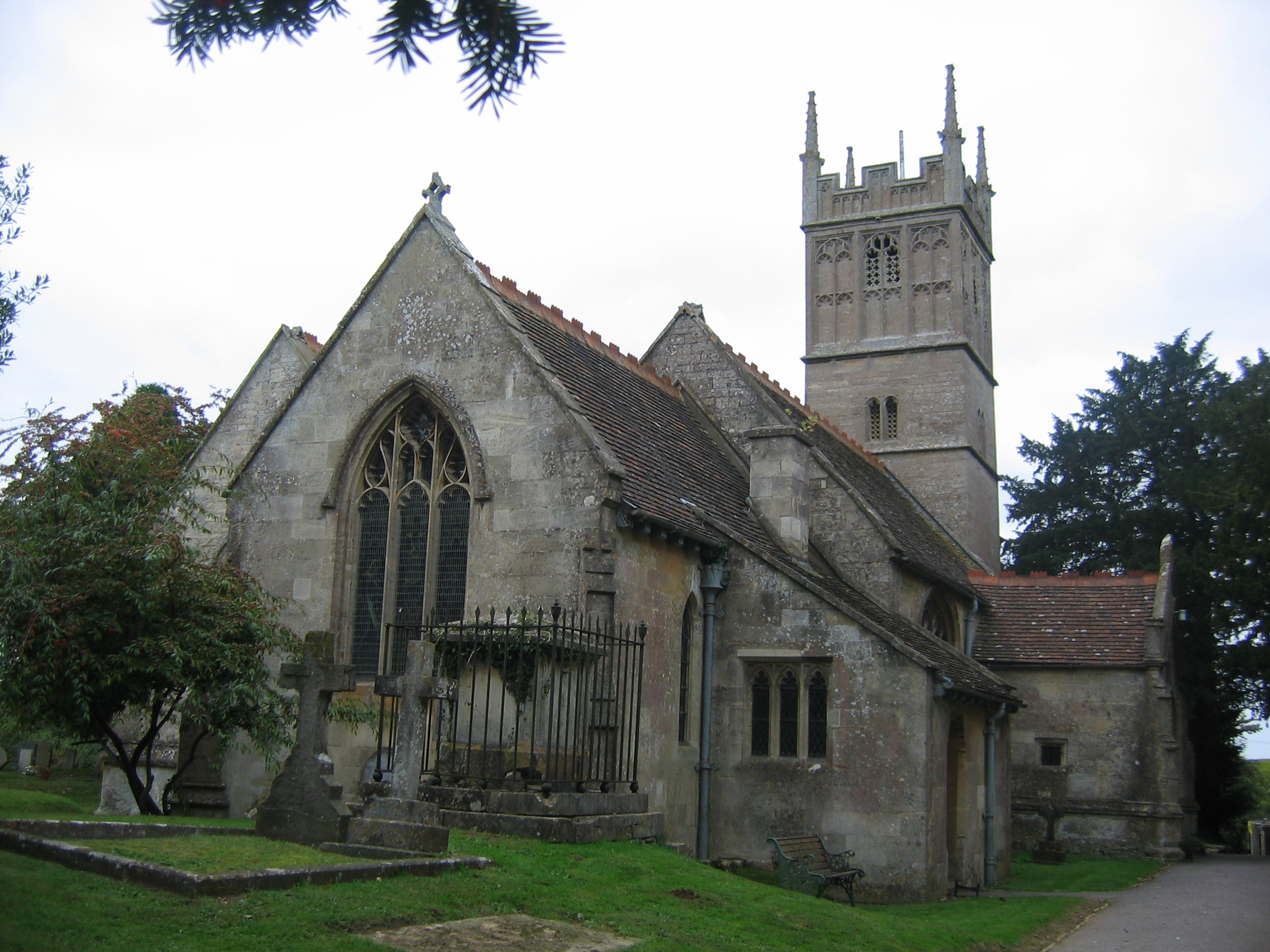
St Margaret's Church

Sir William Keynell built the parish church in 1250 as thanks for his safe return from The Crusades; as a result, it bears the unusual dedication to St Margaret of Antioch. Only the lower part of the four-stage west tower and perhaps parts of the chancel survive from that time; the rest of the tower and the north side of the nave are from a 15th-century rebuilding, while the remainder was "drastically restored" (Pevsner) to designs of G. E. Street in 1868. The work included re-roofing and the addition of the vestry. The church was designated as Grade I listed in 1960.

The 15th-century stone chancel screen is said by Historic England to be exceptional. There are four bells: three cast in the 17th century and one in 1887 (by Gillett & Co.).

The former rectory, on the other side of the main road, has origins in the 17th and 18th centuries and was altered and extended in the early 19th. In 2017 the five-bedroom house was offered for sale at £1.1 million.

The parish is part of the Bybrook grouping, alongside seven other rural parishes.

== Elected representatives ==
The first tier of local government is the parish council. Most local government functions are carried out by Wiltshire Council, a unitary authority. The parish forms part of the By Brook electoral division, which elects one member of Wiltshire Council.

For Westminster elections, the parish is within the South Cotswolds constituency, where it has been represented since 2024 by Roz Savage for the Liberal Democrats.

== Schools ==
A school was built in 1858–9 at the south end of the village, paid for by subscriptions organised by the vicar. It had a schoolteacher's house facing the road with schoolrooms attached behind, all in local stone. By 1878, attendance had risen to 83. Children of all ages attended until 1945, when those aged 11 and over were transferred to the secondary school at Chippenham.

Numbers had fallen to 27 in 1986 but then increased, reaching 52 in 1995 – still using the Victorian building, supplemented by a mobile classroom and the village hall. A new larger building, By Brook Valley CofE Primary School, opened in 1998 on the other side of the road; as well as replacing the village school, this also enabled the closure of the small schools at Biddestone, Nettleton and Castle Combe.

== Amenities ==
There is a village hall, a doctors' surgery and a shop with a post office.

The southern part of the Castle Combe motor racing circuit (on the site of a Second World War airfield) falls within the parish.

== Notable people ==
- John Aubrey, antiquary and writer, known for his descriptions of Avebury and Stonehenge, attended the church school.
- Sir Charles Snell owned land in Yatton Keynell and sold it to invest in the ship Angel Gabriel for the expedition by Raleigh to Guiana in 1595. The family owned the Manor House in West Yatton Lane from the late 17th century.
