= Listed buildings in Castle Combe =

Buildings in Castle Combe, Wiltshire, England

Castle Combe is a village and civil parish in Wiltshire, England. It contains 104 listed buildings that are recorded in the National Heritage List for England. Of these one is grade I, three are grade II* and 100 are grade II.

This list is based on the information retrieved online from Historic England.

== Key ==
Grade	Criteria
I	Buildings that are of exceptional interest
II*	Particularly important buildings of more than special interest
II	Buildings that are of special interest

== Listing ==
Name	Grade	Location	Type	Completed (Note: The date given is the date used by Historic England as significant for the initial building or that of an important part in the structure's description.)	Date designated	Grid ref. (Note: The grid reference is based on the British national grid reference system, sometimes known as OSGB36, used by the Ordnance Survey.) Geo-coordinates	Notes	Entry number (Note: The "List Entry Number" is a unique number assigned to each listed building and scheduled monument by Historic England.)	Image	Wikidata
K6 Telephone Kiosk To Rear Of The Old Rectory	II	Estate Yard			26 January 1989	ST8422077128; 51°29′34″N 2°13′43″W		1023042	K6 Telephone Kiosk To Rear Of The Old Rectory More images	Q26274060
Bellcote to East Side of Italian Garden of Manor House Hotel	II	Manor House			9 December 1985	ST8406177260; 51°29′39″N 2°13′52″W		1283574	Upload Photo	Q26572416
Bridge over Bybrook about 500 Metres North Northwest of Manor House Hotel	II	Manor House			9 December 1985	ST8378977617; 51°29′50″N 2°14′06″W		1022861	Bridge over Bybrook about 500 Metres North Northwest of Manor House Hotel More images	Q26273705
Garden Seat to North Side of Italian Garden North East of Manor House Hotel	II	Manor House			9 December 1985	ST8401677274; 51°29′39″N 2°13′54″W		1022860	Upload Photo	Q26273704
Kitchen Garden North Wall, North East Of Manor House Hotel	II	Manor House			9 December 1985	ST8405077309; 51°29′40″N 2°13′52″W		1283538	Upload Photo	Q26572381
Steps Adjoining Manor House Hotel to North East	II	Manor House			20 December 1960	ST8401077209; 51°29′37″N 2°13′54″W		1363578	Steps Adjoining Manor House Hotel to North East More images	Q26645402
Summerhouse in Italian Garden North East of Manor House Hotel	II	Manor House			9 December 1985	ST8403577270; 51°29′39″N 2°13′53″W		1363579	Summerhouse in Italian Garden North East of Manor House Hotel More images	Q26645403
The Manor House Hotel	II	Manor House			20 December 1960	ST8398877220; 51°29′37″N 2°13′55″W		1199055	Upload Photo	Q6751348
Barrett Tomb in Churchyard, About 1 Metre East Of Sealy Tomb South East Of Porch Of Church Of St Andrew	II	Market Place			9 December 1985	ST8416377177; 51°29′36″N 2°13′46″W		1022872	Barrett Tomb in Churchyard, About 1 Metre East Of Sealy Tomb South East Of Porch Of Church Of St Andrew More images	Q26273715
Beak Tomb In Churchyard, About 1 Metre West Of Kidd Tomb, South West Of South Porch Of Church Of St Andrew	II	Market Place			9 December 1985	ST8414777176; 51°29′36″N 2°13′47″W		1199133	Beak Tomb In Churchyard, About 1 Metre West Of Kidd Tomb, South West Of South Porch Of Church Of St Andrew More images	Q26495040
Broom Tomb In Churchyard, About 2 Metres South Of Barrett Tomb, South East Of Porch Of Church Of St Andrew	II	Market Place			9 December 1985	ST8416377175; 51°29′36″N 2°13′46″W		1199155	Broom Tomb In Churchyard, About 2 Metres South Of Barrett Tomb, South East Of Porch Of Church Of St Andrew More images	Q26495056
Child Tomb in Churchyard, About 7 Metres North Of North Aisle Of Church Of St Andrew	II	Market Place			9 December 1985	ST8414577201; 51°29′37″N 2°13′47″W		1022865	Child Tomb in Churchyard, About 7 Metres North Of North Aisle Of Church Of St Andrew More images	Q26273707
Church Cottage	II	Market Place			20 December 1960	ST8417877200; 51°29′37″N 2°13′45″W		1283503	Church Cottage More images	Q26572348
Church of St Andrew	I	Market Place			20 December 1960	ST8415277189; 51°29′36″N 2°13′47″W		1022864	Church of St Andrew More images	Q17529240
Coleman Tomb In Churchyard, About 4 Metres South Of Newman Tomb, South Of Porch Of Church Of St Andrew	II	Market Place			9 December 1985	ST8415777175; 51°29′36″N 2°13′47″W		1022869	Coleman Tomb In Churchyard, About 4 Metres South Of Newman Tomb, South Of Porch Of Church Of St Andrew More images	Q26273712
Court Cottage House Adjoining White Hart Inn To South	II	Market Place			20 December 1960	ST8420977172; 51°29′36″N 2°13′44″W		1283543	Court Cottage House Adjoining White Hart Inn To South More images	Q26572386
Denny Tomb In Churchyard, About 5 Metres South Of Aisle South East Angle Of Church Of St Andrew	II	Market Place			9 December 1985	ST8416777182; 51°29′36″N 2°13′46″W		1199163	Denny Tomb In Churchyard, About 5 Metres South Of Aisle South East Angle Of Church Of St Andrew More images	Q26495063
Farr Tomb in Churchyard about 2 Metres South East of Jones Tomb, South Of South Aisle Of Church Of St Andrew	II	Market Place			9 December 1985	ST8416677175; 51°29′36″N 2°13′46″W		1022873	Farr Tomb in Churchyard about 2 Metres South East of Jones Tomb, South Of South Aisle Of Church Of St Andrew More images	Q26273717
House to North of Market Cross Cottage	II	Market Place			20 December 1960	ST8418277183; 51°29′36″N 2°13′45″W		1363581	House to North of Market Cross Cottage More images	Q26645405
James Archer Tomb In Churchyard, About 1 Metre South Of Sealy Tomb, South East Of Porch Of Church Of St Andrew	II	Market Place			9 December 1985	ST8416177176; 51°29′36″N 2°13′46″W		1022870	James Archer Tomb In Churchyard, About 1 Metre South Of Sealy Tomb, South East Of Porch Of Church Of St Andrew More images	Q26273713
Jones Tomb In Churchyard, About 9 Metres South Of Rood Stair Of Church Of St Andrew	II	Market Place			9 December 1985	ST8416777177; 51°29′36″N 2°13′46″W		1283498	Upload Photo	Q26572343
Kidd Tomb In Churchyard, About 5 Metres South Of South Porch Of Church Of St Andrew	II	Market Place			9 December 1985	ST8415277176; 51°29′36″N 2°13′47″W		1199131	Kidd Tomb In Churchyard, About 5 Metres South Of South Porch Of Church Of St Andrew More images	Q26495038
King Tomb In Churchyard, About 3 Metes South Of Kidd Tomb, South Of South Porch Of Church Of St Andrew	II	Market Place			9 December 1985	ST8415177173; 51°29′36″N 2°13′47″W		1363582	King Tomb In Churchyard, About 3 Metes South Of Kidd Tomb, South Of South Porch Of Church Of St Andrew More images	Q26645406
Kington Tomb in Churchyard about 1 Metre South of Farr Tomb, South Of South Aisle Of Church Of St Andrew	II	Market Place			9 December 1985	ST8416677173; 51°29′36″N 2°13′46″W		1022874	Kington Tomb in Churchyard about 1 Metre South of Farr Tomb, South Of South Aisle Of Church Of St Andrew More images	Q26273718
Market Cross Cottage and War Memorial	II	Market Place			20 December 1960	ST8418477171; 51°29′36″N 2°13′45″W		1283550	Market Cross Cottage and War Memorial More images	Q26572393
Newman Tomb In Churchyard, About 7 Metres South Of South Porch, Church Of St Andrew	II	Market Place			9 December 1985	ST8415777178; 51°29′36″N 2°13′47″W		1363584	Newman Tomb In Churchyard, About 7 Metres South Of South Porch, Church Of St Andrew More images	Q26645408
R Sargent Tomb In Churchyard, About 7 Metres South Of South Aisle Of Church Of St Andrew	II	Market Place			9 December 1985	ST8416777179; 51°29′36″N 2°13′46″W		1363549	R Sargent Tomb In Churchyard, About 7 Metres South Of South Aisle Of Church Of St Andrew More images	Q26645374
Sargent Tomb In Churchyard About 5 Metres South Of Rood Stair Of Church Of St Andrew	II	Market Place			9 December 1985	ST8416377179; 51°29′36″N 2°13′46″W		1363586	Sargent Tomb In Churchyard About 5 Metres South Of Rood Stair Of Church Of St Andrew More images	Q26645410
Sealy Tomb In Churchyard, About 4 Metres East Of Newman Tomb South East Of South Porch Of Church Of St Andrew	II	Market Place			9 December 1985	ST8416177177; 51°29′36″N 2°13′46″W		1363585	Sealy Tomb In Churchyard, About 4 Metres East Of Newman Tomb South East Of South Porch Of Church Of St Andrew More images	Q26645409
Smith Tomb In Churchyard, About 7 Metres North Of Tower Of Church Of St Andrew	II	Market Place			9 December 1985	ST8413677197; 51°29′37″N 2°13′48″W		1199128	Smith Tomb In Churchyard, About 7 Metres North Of Tower Of Church Of St Andrew More images	Q26495036
The Butter Cross	II	Market Place			9 December 1985	ST8419877197; 51°29′37″N 2°13′44″W		1283541	The Butter Cross More images	Q17675034
The Castle Hotel	II	Market Place			20 December 1960	ST8420277214; 51°29′37″N 2°13′44″W		1022863	The Castle Hotel More images	Q26273706
The Malthouse	II	Market Place			20 December 1960	ST8423277197; 51°29′37″N 2°13′43″W		1199090	The Malthouse More images	Q26495004
The Old Court House	II*	Market Place			20 December 1960	ST8421277154; 51°29′35″N 2°13′44″W		1022862	The Old Court House More images	Q17534452
The White Hart Inn	II	Market Place			20 December 1960	ST8421777188; 51°29′36″N 2°13′43″W		1363580	The White Hart Inn More images	Q26645404
Unidentified Tomb in Churchyard about 11 Metres South of East End of Church of St Andrew	II	Market Place			9 December 1985	ST8417177181; 51°29′36″N 2°13′46″W		1283502	Upload Photo	Q26572347
Unidentified Tomb in Churchyard about 8 Metres South of East End of Church of St Andrew	II	Market Place			9 December 1985	ST8417077183; 51°29′36″N 2°13′46″W		1022875	Upload Photo	Q26273719
Unidentified Tomb in Churchyard, About 16 Metres South Of East End Of Church Of St Andrew	II	Market Place			9 December 1985	ST8417177180; 51°29′36″N 2°13′46″W		1022876	Upload Photo	Q26273720
Unidentified Tomb In Churchyard, About 5 Metres West Of Beak Tomb, South West Of South Porch Of Church Of St Andrew	II	Market Place			9 December 1985	ST8414077176; 51°29′36″N 2°13′47″W		1022868	Unidentified Tomb In Churchyard, About 5 Metres West Of Beak Tomb, South West Of South Porch Of Church Of St Andrew More images	Q26273710
Unidentified Tomb In Churchyard, About 5 Metres West Of King Tomb, South West Of South Porch Of Church Of St Andrew	II	Market Place			9 December 1985	ST8414677171; 51°29′36″N 2°13′47″W		1363583	Unidentified Tomb In Churchyard, About 5 Metres West Of King Tomb, South West Of South Porch Of Church Of St Andrew More images	Q26645407
Unidentified Tomb in Churchyard, About 6 Metres South Of Beak Tomb, South West Of South Porch Of Church Of St Andrew	II	Market Place			9 December 1985	ST8415177168; 51°29′36″N 2°13′47″W		1022866	Unidentified Tomb in Churchyard, About 6 Metres South Of Beak Tomb, South West Of South Porch Of Church Of St Andrew More images	Q26273708
Unidentified Tomb in Churchyard, About 6 Metres West South West Of King Tomb South West Of South Porch Of Church Of St Andrew	II	Market Place			9 December 1985	ST8414677169; 51°29′36″N 2°13′47″W		1022867	Unidentified Tomb in Churchyard, About 6 Metres West South West Of King Tomb South West Of South Porch Of Church Of St Andrew More images	Q26273709
William Archer Tomb in Churchyard, About 3 Metres South Of Sealy Tomb, South East Of Porch Of Church Of St Andrew	II	Market Place			9 December 1985	ST8416077174; 51°29′36″N 2°13′46″W		1022871	William Archer Tomb in Churchyard, About 3 Metres South Of Sealy Tomb, South East Of Porch Of Church Of St Andrew More images	Q26273714
Gardeners House	II	Park Lane			20 December 1960	ST8411677272; 51°29′39″N 2°13′49″W		1022878	Upload Photo	Q26273722
Yew Tree Cottage	II	Park Lane			9 December 1985	ST8411577253; 51°29′38″N 2°13′49″W		1199169	Upload Photo	Q26495070
1, Park Lane	II	1, Park Lane			20 December 1960	ST8417477232; 51°29′38″N 2°13′46″W		1022877	1, Park Lane More images	Q26273721
Castle Combe Primary School And Gates Attached To South East Corner	II	School Lane			9 December 1985	ST8441177511; 51°29′47″N 2°13′33″W		1363550	Upload Photo	Q26645375
Walled Garden to Rear of Castle Combe Primary School Including Former Chippenham Butter Market	II	School Lane			9 December 1985	ST8439277528; 51°29′47″N 2°13′34″W		1199184	Upload Photo	Q26495084
2, School Lane	II	2, School Lane			9 December 1985	ST8444777538; 51°29′48″N 2°13′32″W		1199176	2, School Lane More images	Q26495076
Barn at Shrub Farm	II	Shrub Farm			20 December 1960	ST8376076549; 51°29′16″N 2°14′07″W		1199009	Upload Photo	Q26494929
April Cottage	II	The Hill			20 December 1960	ST8451077579; 51°29′49″N 2°13′28″W		1283563	April Cottage More images	Q26572405
Castle House	II	The Hill			9 December 1982	ST8421077229; 51°29′38″N 2°13′44″W		1283557	Castle House More images	Q26572399
East Combe Farmhouse	II	The Hill			9 December 1985	ST8465277536; 51°29′48″N 2°13′21″W		1022856	Upload Photo	Q26273700
Hill Cottage	II	The Hill			9 December 1985	ST8448677540; 51°29′48″N 2°13′30″W		1199026	Hill Cottage More images	Q26494944
Hill House	II	The Hill			9 December 1985	ST8438677376; 51°29′42″N 2°13′35″W		1363577	Hill House More images	Q26645401
Hillside House with Wall and Gatepiers	II	The Hill			20 December 1960	ST8423477217; 51°29′37″N 2°13′43″W		1022855	Hillside House with Wall and Gatepiers More images	Q26273699
The Dower House	II*	The Hill			20 December 1960	ST8421777248; 51°29′38″N 2°13′43″W		1199036	The Dower House More images	Q17543650
The Old Bakery	II	The Hill			20 December 1960	ST8420477232; 51°29′38″N 2°13′44″W		1022857	Upload Photo	Q26273701
The Old Werretts	II	The Hill			9 December 1985	ST8464077585; 51°29′49″N 2°13′22″W		1022858	Upload Photo	Q26273702
Chandlers	II	The Street			20 December 1960	ST8421077141; 51°29′35″N 2°13′44″W		1022881	Chandlers More images	Q26273725
Combe Cottage	II	The Street			20 December 1960	ST8419477147; 51°29′35″N 2°13′45″W		1199212	Combe Cottage More images	Q26495112
Corbett Cottage	II	The Street			20 December 1960	ST8419877131; 51°29′34″N 2°13′44″W		1363553	Corbett Cottage More images	Q26645378
Gable Cottage	II	The Street			20 December 1960	ST8421477095; 51°29′33″N 2°13′44″W		1363551	Gable Cottage More images	Q26645376
Gables Cottage	II	The Street			20 December 1960	ST8419877123; 51°29′34″N 2°13′44″W		1283482	Gables Cottage More images	Q26572328
Reading Room Cottage	II	The Street			20 December 1960	ST8419377157; 51°29′35″N 2°13′45″W		1022883	Reading Room Cottage More images	Q26273727
Riverside House	II	The Street			20 December 1960	ST8419677096; 51°29′33″N 2°13′45″W		1363552	Riverside House More images	Q26645377
The Bridge	II	The Street			20 December 1960	ST8420377064; 51°29′32″N 2°13′44″W		1022879	The Bridge More images	Q26273723
The Dovecote, In Grounds To West Of Riverside House	II	The Street			9 December 1985	ST8417477096; 51°29′33″N 2°13′46″W		1199201	Upload Photo	Q26495101
The Old Post Office	II	The Street			20 December 1960	ST8421577084; 51°29′33″N 2°13′44″W		1199191	The Old Post Office More images	Q26495091
The Old Rectory	II	The Street			9 December 1985	ST8421477111; 51°29′34″N 2°13′44″W		1199195	The Old Rectory More images	Q26495095
Unicorn Cottage	II	The Street			20 December 1960	ST8419877104; 51°29′34″N 2°13′44″W		1283480	Unicorn Cottage More images	Q26572326
Unicorn Gallery	II	The Street			20 December 1960	ST8419677113; 51°29′34″N 2°13′45″W		1022882	Unicorn Gallery More images	Q26273726
Barn to North West of Hans Farmhouse	II	Upper Castle Combe			9 December 1985	ST8477577413; 51°29′44″N 2°13′15″W		1363555	Upload Photo	Q26645380
Fuschia Cottage Rose Cottage	II	Upper Castle Combe			9 December 1985	ST8484877351; 51°29′42″N 2°13′11″W		1283487	Fuschia Cottage Rose Cottage More images	Q26572333
Hans Farmhouse	II*	Upper Castle Combe			20 December 1960	ST8479877406; 51°29′43″N 2°13′13″W		1022885	Upload Photo	Q17534463
Lavender Cottage	II	Upper Castle Combe			9 December 1985	ST8484177387; 51°29′43″N 2°13′11″W		1363554	Upload Photo	Q26645379
Stable to North of Hans Farmhouse	II	Upper Castle Combe			9 December 1985	ST8479677430; 51°29′44″N 2°13′13″W		1022886	Upload Photo	Q26273729
The Gables	II	Upper Castle Combe			20 December 1960	ST8476377635; 51°29′51″N 2°13′15″W		1022887	Upload Photo	Q26273731
The Manse and Congregational Chapel	II	Upper Castle Combe			9 December 1985	ST8499177352; 51°29′42″N 2°13′03″W		1199215	Upload Photo	Q26495114
Upper Combe Farmhouse	II	Upper Castle Combe			9 December 1985	ST8476577749; 51°29′54″N 2°13′15″W		1363556	Upload Photo	Q26645381
Wall and Gate Piers to Hans Farmhouse	II	Upper Castle Combe			9 December 1985	ST8481077409; 51°29′43″N 2°13′13″W		1199226	Upload Photo	Q26495125
The Gables	II	1 and 2, Upper Castle Combe			20 December 1960	ST8483077426; 51°29′44″N 2°13′12″W		1199222	Upload Photo	Q26678837
The Old Forge The Old Smithy	II	9, Upper Castle Combe			9 December 1985	ST8482677342; 51°29′41″N 2°13′12″W		1022884	Upload Photo	Q26273728
Weavers House	II	Water Lane			9 December 1985	ST8422677026; 51°29′31″N 2°13′43″W		1022890	Upload Photo	Q26273734
Bridge House	II	1, Water Lane			20 December 1960	ST8421877072; 51°29′33″N 2°13′43″W		1022880	Bridge House More images	Q26273724
2 and 3, Water Lane	II	2 and 3, Water Lane			20 December 1960	ST8422277058; 51°29′32″N 2°13′43″W		1022888	2 and 3, Water Lane More images	Q26273732
4, Water Lane	II	4, Water Lane			20 December 1960	ST8422777051; 51°29′32″N 2°13′43″W		1363557	4, Water Lane More images	Q26645382
5, Water Lane	II	5, Water Lane			20 December 1960	ST8423077041; 51°29′32″N 2°13′43″W		1022889	5, Water Lane More images	Q26273733
Brookside	II	Waterside			9 December 1985	ST8413376916; 51°29′27″N 2°13′48″W		1022893	Brookside More images	Q26273737
Bybrook Lodge	II	Waterside			9 December 1985	ST8418077038; 51°29′31″N 2°13′45″W		1363558	Upload Photo	Q26645383
Centre Cottage	II	Waterside			20 December 1960	ST8415376925; 51°29′28″N 2°13′47″W		1022892	Upload Photo	Q26273736
Entrance Gates and Wall to Manor House	II	Waterside			9 December 1985	ST8417377058; 51°29′32″N 2°13′46″W		1022891	Entrance Gates and Wall to Manor House More images	Q26273735
North Cottage	II	Waterside			20 December 1960	ST8415776933; 51°29′28″N 2°13′47″W		1363559	Upload Photo	Q26645384
Roman Bridge	II	Waterside			20 December 1960	ST8410076836; 51°29′25″N 2°13′49″W		1199255	Roman Bridge More images	Q26495149
South Cottage	II	Waterside			20 December 1960	ST8414776919; 51°29′28″N 2°13′47″W		1283461	Upload Photo	Q26572309
Vale Cottage	II	Waterside			20 December 1960	ST8415476946; 51°29′28″N 2°13′47″W		1199242	Upload Photo	Q26495139
Archway Cottage	II	West Street			20 December 1960	ST8416577227; 51°29′38″N 2°13′46″W		1363560	Archway Cottage More images	Q26645385
House Adjoining Manor House Hotel Entrance Gates	II	West Street			9 December 1985	ST8407377208; 51°29′37″N 2°13′51″W		1199262	House Adjoining Manor House Hotel Entrance Gates More images	Q26495156
1-3, West Street	II	1-3, West Street			20 December 1960	ST8413877223; 51°29′37″N 2°13′48″W		1199259	1-3, West Street More images	Q26495153
4, West Street	II	4, West Street			20 December 1960	ST8412677221; 51°29′37″N 2°13′48″W		1022894	4, West Street More images	Q26273738
Colham Mill Farmhouse	II				20 December 1960	ST8416876101; 51°29′01″N 2°13′46″W		1022853	Upload Photo	Q26273697
Lower Colham	II				9 December 1985	ST8456375929; 51°28′56″N 2°13′25″W		1022854	Upload Photo	Q26273698
Shrub House	II				9 December 1985	ST8383576573; 51°29′16″N 2°14′03″W		1022852	Upload Photo	Q26273696
Stable Range to South of Colham Mill Farmhouse	II				9 December 1985	ST8418176089; 51°29′01″N 2°13′45″W		1283589	Upload Photo	Q26572429

== See also ==
- Grade I listed buildings in Wiltshire
- Grade II* listed buildings in Wiltshire

== Sources ==
- Orbach, Julian; Pevsner, Nikolaus; Cherry, Bridget (2021), Wiltshire, The Buildings of England, New Haven and London: Yale University Press, ISBN 978-0-300-25120-3
