= 2012 Mini 7 Racing Club season =

2012 Mini Se7en

Seasons
- ← 2011 2013 →

The 2012 Mini 7 Racing Club season consisted of twelve rounds over seven events including returns to Oulton Park and Castle Combe. Endaf Owens was the Mini Miglia defending champion and Paul Spark the Mini Se7en defending champion.

== 2012 calendar ==
Round	Circuit	Date	Race Winner		Results (PDFs)
Round	Circuit	Date	Mini Miglia	Mini Se7en	Results (PDFs)
1	(England) Oulton Park, Cheshire	24 March		Paul THOMPSON	
2	(England) Donington Park, Leicestershire	21 April		Gareth HUNT	
3	(England) Donington Park, Leicestershire	22 April		Andrew DEVINY	
4	(England) Castle Combe, Wiltshire	7 May			
5	(England) Brands Hatch, Kent	16 June			
6	(England) Brands Hatch, Kent	17 June			
7	(England) Snetterton, Norfolk	14 July			
8	(England) Snetterton, Norfolk	15 July			
9	(England) Thruxton, Hampshire	18 August			
10	(England) Thruxton, Hampshire	19 August			
11	(England) Croft, North Yorkshire	29 September			
12	(England) Croft, North Yorkshire	30 September			

== Scoring system ==
Position	1st	2nd	3rd	4th	5th	6th	7th	8th	9th	10th	11th	12th	13th	14th	15th	16th	17th	18th	All Other Finishers	All Other Starters
Points	20	19	18	17	16	15	14	13	12	11	10	9	8	7	6	5	4	3	2	1
