= Tiddly Wink =

Tiddly Wink may refer to:

- Tiddlywinks, an indoor game
- Tiddleywink, hamlet in Wiltshire, England
- Tiddly Wink (pony), character in the My Little Pony franchise
- Tiddly-Wink (domino game), domino game in which playing a double entitles a second play
