= 2011 Mini 7 Racing Club season =

2011 Mini Se7en

Seasons
- ← 2010 2012 →

The 2011 Mini 7 Racing Club season consisted of thirteen rounds over seven events including a return to Spa-Francorchamps for the first time since 2006. Paul Thompson was the Mini Miglia defending champion and Paul Spark the Mini Se7en defending champion.

== 2011 Calendar ==
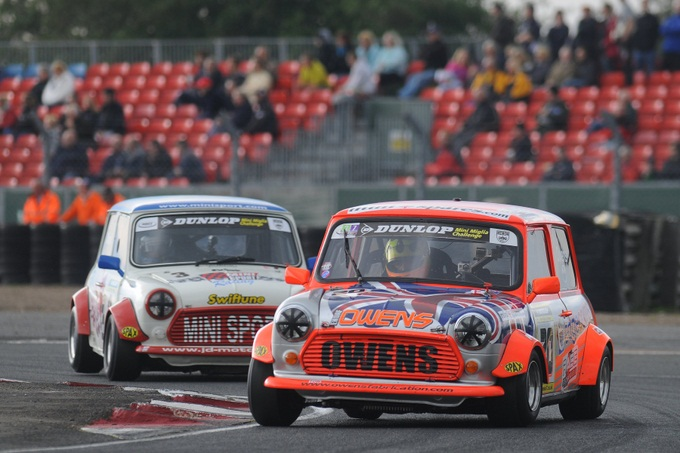
2011 Mini Miglia Champion Endaf Owens.

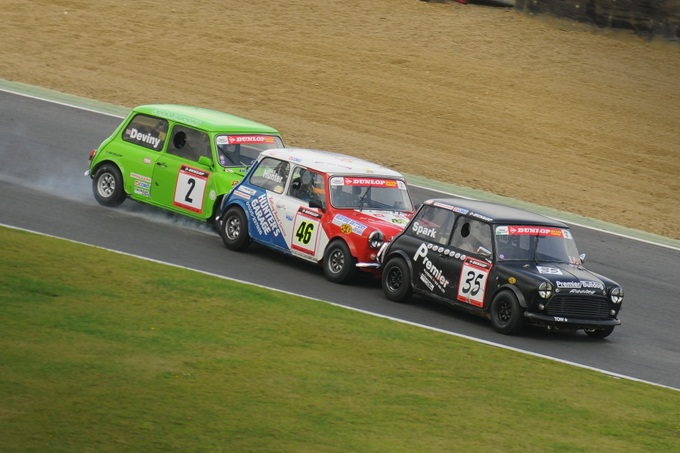
Paul Spark (black Mini in front) successfully defends his Mini Se7en championship.

Round	Circuit	Date	Race Winner		Results (PDFs)
Round	Circuit	Date	Mini Miglia	Mini Se7en	Results (PDFs)
1	(England) Silverstone, Northamptonshire	26 March	(Wales) Endaf Owens	(England) Max Hunter	Results
2	(England) Snetterton, Norfolk	7 May	(Wales) Endaf Owens	(England) Paul Spark	Miglia Results; Se7en Results
3	(England) Snetterton, Norfolk	8 May	(Wales) Endaf Owens	(England) Max Hunter	Miglia Results; Se7en Results
4	Spa-Francorchamps, Belgium	11 June	(England) Paul Thompson	(England) Paul Spark	
5	Spa-Francorchamps, Belgium	12 June	(England) Kane Astin	(England) Andrew Deviny	
6	(England) Donington Park, Leicestershire	16 July	(England) Tony Le May	(England) Max Hunter	Miglia Results; Se7en Results
7	(England) Donington Park, Leicestershire	17 July	(England) Tony Le May	(England) Gareth Hunt	Miglia Results; Se7en Results
8	(England) Thruxton, Hampshire	13 August	(Wales) Endaf Owens	(England) Paul Spark	Se7en & Miglia Results
9	(England) Thruxton, Hampshire	14 August	(Wales) Endaf Owens	(England) Paul Spark	Se7en & Miglia Results
10	(England) Brands Hatch, Kent	28 August	(England) Kane Astin	(England) Max Hunter	Se7en & Miglia Results
11	(England) Brands Hatch, Kent	29 August	(Wales) Endaf Owens	(England) Max Hunter	Se7en & Miglia Results
12	(England) Croft, North Yorkshire	24 September	(Wales) Endaf Owens	(England) Andrew Deviny	Se7en & Miglia Results
13	(England) Croft, North Yorkshire	25 September	(Wales) Endaf Owens	(England) Paul Spark	Se7en & Miglia Results

== Scoring system ==
Position	1st	2nd	3rd	4th	5th	6th	7th	8th	9th	10th	11th	12th	13th	14th	15th	16th	17th	18th	All Other Finishers	All Other Starters
Points	20	19	18	17	16	15	14	13	12	11	10	9	8	7	6	5	4	3	2	1

== Championship Standings ==
=== Dunlop Mini Miglia Championship ===
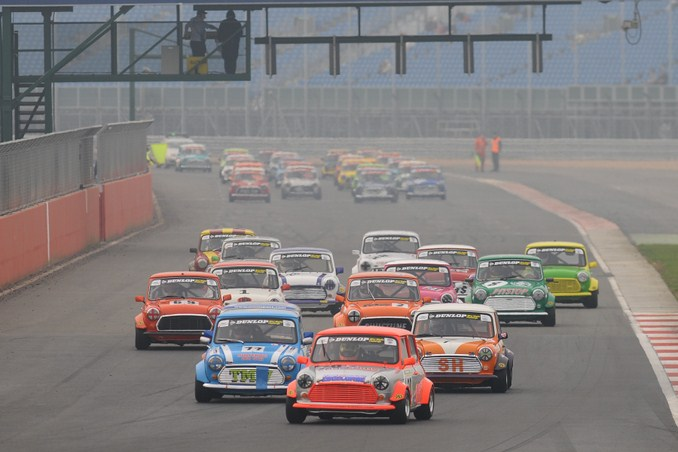
Start of the race at Silverstone. Mini Miglias in the foreground and Se7ens in the background.

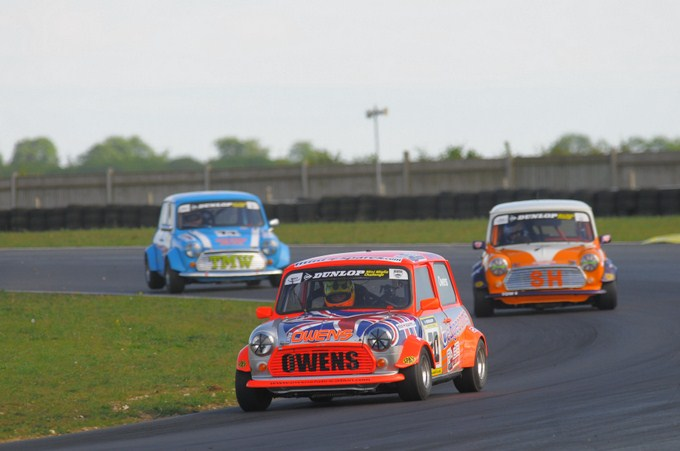
Mini Miglias battling at Snetterton. Front=Endaf Owens, Middle=Sarah Munns, Back=Kane Astin.

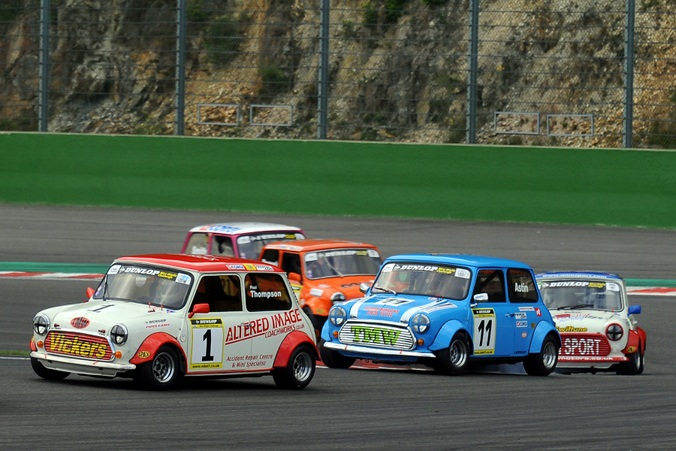
Mini Miglias at Spa

Pos	No	Driver	(England) SIL	(England) SNE		(Belgium) SPA		(England) DON		(England) THR		(England) BRH		(England) CRO		Total Pts	Best 10
Pos	No	Driver	1	2	3	4	5	6	7	8	9	10	11	12	13	Total Pts	Best 10
1	20	(Wales) Endaf Owens	1	1	1	Ret	2	Ret	Ret	1	1	2	1	1	1	201	198
2	3	(England) Dave Drew	7	6	4	4	3	Ret	3	2	5	7	3	2	4	203	174
3	69	(England) Tony Le May	15	3	3	5	Ret	1	1	9	8	4	4	8	5	187	168
4	7	(England) Sarah Munns	4	2	2	3	Ret	2	10	7	6	3	7	6	8	193	168
5	1	(England) Paul Thompson	6	Ret	7	1	Ret	3	5	5	2	6	6	4	6	182	166
6	2	(England) Colin Peacock	3	5	5	7	4			4	4	5	5	3	7	179	165
7	11	(England) Kane Astin	2	7	6	2	1	Ret	DSQ	3	7	1	2	Ret	2	179	163
8	21	(England) Aaron Smith	5	9	9	6	5	5	2	6	3	Ret	8	5	3	187	162
9	8	(England) Mark Sims	8	4	10	8	Ret	4	4	10	9	8	10	7	10	161	138
10	10	(England) Phil Harvey	14	13	14	13	7	7	9	12	12	13	Ret	Ret	12	107	98
11	42	(England) Paul Simmonds	11			11	6			Ret	10	10	11	9	11	90	90
12	23	(England) Rupert Deeth	13	12	Ret	Ret	Ret	Ret	7	8	Ret	11	14	DNS	9	78	76
13	44	(England) Paul Clark	9			9	Ret	6	6							55	55
14	6	(England) Niven Burge		8	8					DNS	Ret	9	9			51	51
15	17	(England) Steve Whiteley						8	8	11	11					46	46
16	55	(England) Michael Green	10	10	11	10	Ret									44	44
17	28	(England) Robert Humphreys	12	11	12	Ret	Ret									30	30
18	24	(Portugal) Nuno Pimenta				12	8									22	22
19	10	(England) Rob Howard		Ret	13	Ret	DNS						13			18	18
20	27	(England) James Lindridge										12	12			18	18
21	15	(England) Gordon Pocock												10	Ret	12	12
22	9	(England) Mark Cowan		Ret	Ret			Ret	DNS							3	3
23	14	(England) Robert Morris										Ret	Ret			2	2
24	97	(England) Andrew Wilson												Ret	DNS	1	1
Pos	No	Driver	1	2	3	4	5	6	7	8	9	10	11	12	13	Total Pts	Best 10
Pos	No	Driver	SIL (England)	SNE (England)		SPA (Belgium)		DON (England)		THR (England)		BRH (England)		CRO (England)		Total Pts	Best 10

=== Dunlop Mini Se7en Championship ===
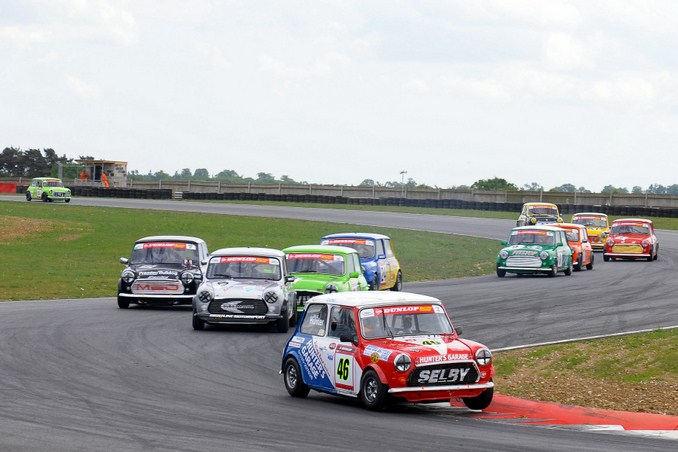
Mini Se7ens at Snetterton being led by Max Hunter.

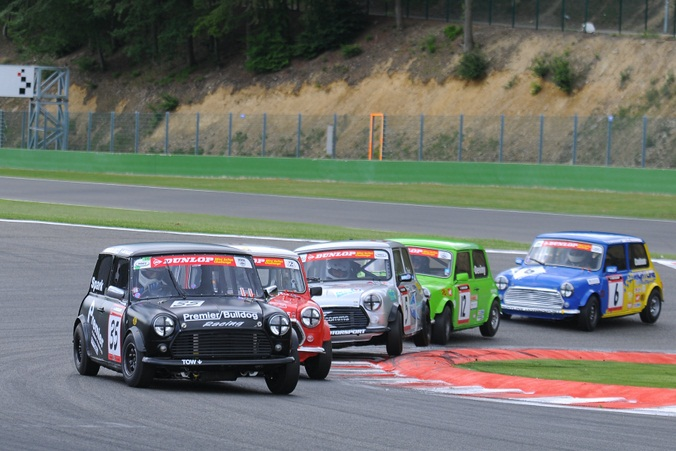
Paul Spark leading the Mini Se7ens at Spa

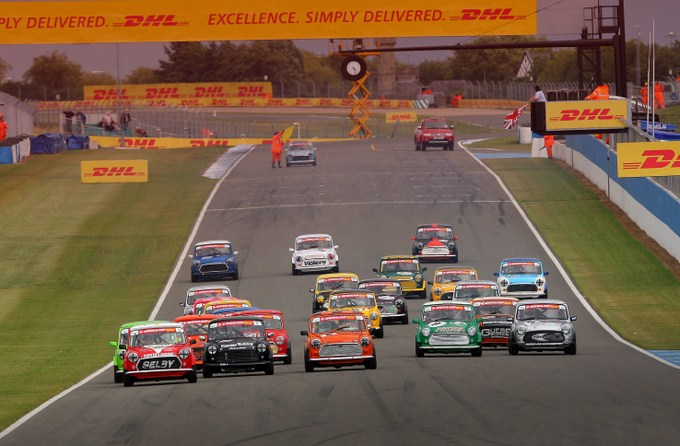
Mini Se7ens at Donington Park

Pos	No	Driver	(England) SIL	(England) SNE		(Belgium) SPA		(England) DON		(England) THR		(England) BRH		(England) CRO		Total Pts	Best 10
Pos	No	Driver	1	2	3	4	5	6	7	8	9	10	11	12	13	Total Pts	Best 10
1	35	(England) Paul Spark	2	1	2	1	Ret	2	Ret	1	1	Ret	2	2	1	198	195
2	2	(England) Andrew Deviny	Ret	5	8	3	1	3	2	2	4	3	3	1	12	206	183
3	46	(England) Max Hunter	1	2	1	2	4	1	DSQ			1	1	4	4	189	172
4	8	(England) Gareth Hunt	5	6	4	5	6	7	1	6	Ret	6	5	5	7	190	161
5	9	(England) Darren Thomas	4	3	7	7	7	4	6	4	3	7	13	8	6	194	159
6	5	(England) Graeme Davis	3	4	3	4	2	Ret	4	7	Ret	4	Ret	Ret	3	159	156
7	6	(England) James Coulson	Ret	15	5	Ret	5	5	Ret	5	Ret	8	4	3	2	141	138
8	91	(England) Julian Affleck S	8	10	11	9	8	14	11	8	5	DNS	11	10	9	138	121
9	95	(England) Julian Proctor S	10	Ret	16	8	Ret	8	7	9	8	11	10	Ret	10	116	113
10	87	(England) Ashley Davies N	15	8	Ret			12	Ret	10	6	9	8	7	5	111	110
11	36	(England) Damon Astin	7	Ret						3	2	Ret	6	6	8	96	96
12	77	(England) Tristen Knight	6	7	6			Ret	3	Ret	Ret	5	Ret	Ret	DNS	83	83
13	63	(England) David Robinson	12	15	20	11	9	15	12	12	Ret	15	15	Ret	Ret	74	71
14	88	(England) Kieren McDonald N	DNS	Ret	12			18	Ret	17	9	12	12	11	11	68	68
15	4	(England) Ian Deviny	Ret	9	9	Ret	Ret	6	5	DNS						58	58
16	28	(England) Jabez Dyer						8	DNS	11	7			8	13	56	56
17	69	(England) Steve Trench	Ret	13	17	10	Ret	DNS	DNS	13	Ret	13	Ret	15	16	54	53
18	44	(England) Adam Smith N		12	13							10	9	12	Ret	50	50
19	94	(England) Robert Pavey SN	9	19	18			19	13	14	12	15	Ret			50	50
20	60	(England) Malcolm Keat	16	14	15	12	Ret	17	14			17	15	Ret		50	50
21	92	(England) Kevin O'Shea S	14	18	22			21	9	DNS	13	18	17	16	17	50	50
22	25	(England) Mike Rayner		11	14			13	16					14	14	44	44
23	38	(England) Steve Hopper				DNS	Ret	10	10					13	15	37	37
24	57	(England) Philip Gillibrand						20	15	16	11	14	14			37	37
25	26	(England) Leon Wightman N	11					15	Ret	15	10					34	34
26	7	(England) Nathan Burge										2	7			33	33
27	43	(England) Ricky Horne				6	3									33	33
28	15	(England) Steve Baker	Ret	Ret	10			11	Ret							24	24
29	82	(England) Andrew Ruthven				13	10									19	19
30	34	(England) Anthony Towey						Ret	8			Ret				15	15
31	47	(England) Kelvin Edgar	13	17	21											14	14
32	33	(England) Geoff Taylor	DNS	20	23											4	4
33	39	(England) Andy Miller		Ret	19											3	3
Pos	No	Driver	1	2	3	4	5	6	7	8	9	10	11	12	13	Total Pts	Best 10
Pos	No	Driver	SIL (England)	SNE (England)		SPA (Belgium)		DON (England)		THR (England)		BRH (England)		CRO (England)		Total Pts	Best 10

Icon	Denotes
N	Novice
S	S Class
