= Rallyday =

Annual rally car event in Wiltshire, England

Rallyday is an annual demonstration event for rally cars held at Castle Combe racing circuit in Wiltshire, England.

The inaugural event took place in 2001 and was organized by Brian Stubbings and Darin Frow of the Mitsubishi Lancer Register, the UK owners club for Mitsubishi Lancer cars. Rally Supercar Day, as it was called in its first year, was held on May 5 and was attended by 2,500 people.

2004 saw the introduction of the 'Raid on Castle Combe', where desert racers were showcased on the circuit infield. In 2005, 25 years of the Audi Quattro was celebrated. The 2005 event was also the last public appearance by Richard Burns, the 2001 World Rally Champion before his death. As a tribute, the 2006 show saw his father Alex Burns lead 50 Subaru Impreza RB5 (a special edition produced to commemorate his 2001 championship) around the circuit. In 2008, Mikko Hirvonen, who was in contention for the 2008 World Rally Championship title, attended the show and performed demonstration runs in his Ford Focus WRC.

Today, the event attracts around 10,000 spectators each year.
