= Castle Combe Castle =

12th-century castle in Wiltshire, England

Coordinates: 51.5000°N 2.2336°W

Castle Combe Castle stood to the north of the village of Castle Combe, Wiltshire, England.

The castle was a medieval motte and bailey castle standing on a limestone spur overlooking the Bybrook River. It was probably built by Reginald de Dunstanville, 1st Earl of Cornwall in the 12th century and was unusual in that it had a keep with at least four and possibly five baileys. Earthworks and some stonework remain.

Since 1981 the site has been a scheduled ancient monument and is described in the National Heritage List for England as "Motte and bailey castle 600 meters north of Castle Combe".

== Sources ==
- "[Survey of] Castle Combe Castle". Archaeological Surveys Ltd. March 2007. Archived from the original on 3 March 2016.
- Plantagenet Somerset Fry (1980). The David & Charles Book of Castles. David & Charles. ISBN 978-0-7153-7976-9.
