= Broomfield, Wiltshire =

Coordinates: 51.503°N 02.183°W

Broomfield
- Location within Wiltshire
- OS grid reference: ST874782
- Civil parish: Yatton Keynell
- Unitary authority: Wiltshire
- Ceremonial county: Wiltshire
- Region: South West
- Country: England
- Sovereign state: United Kingdom
- Post town: Chippenham
- Postcode district: SN14
- Police: Wiltshire
- Fire: Dorset and Wiltshire
- Ambulance: South Western
- UK Parliament: South Cotswolds

Broomfield is a hamlet in Wiltshire, England. It is in Yatton Keynell parish, north of Yatton Keynell village and about 4 miles (6 km) northwest of the town of Chippenham.
