= RAF Castle Combe =

RAF Castle Combe
- Near Castle Combe, Wiltshire in England

Site information
- Type: Royal Air Force station
- Owner: Air Ministry
- Operator: Royal Air Force
- Controlled by: RAF Flying Training Command

Location
- Shown within Wiltshire
- Coordinates: 51°29′23″N 002°12′45″W

Site history
- Built: 1941
- In use: 1941-1948
- Battles/wars: Second World War

Airfield information
- Elevation: 130 metres (427 ft) AMSL
Runways
Direction	Length and surface
00/00	Sommerfeld Tracking
00/00	Sommerfeld Tracking

Royal Air Force Castle Combe or more simply RAF Castle Combe is a former Royal Air Force satellite airfield located 0.5 miles (0.80 km) southeast of Castle Combe, Wiltshire, England.

== History ==
The Castle Combe airfield opened in May 1941. The land which the airfield occupied belonged to the Castle Combe estate, which was owned by the Gorst family.

It was used as a practice landing ground by nearby RAF Hullavington, home of No. 9 Service Flying Training School RAF. Flying training expanded considerably and the facilities were upgraded. Waterlogging was a frequent problem for the grass surface, so two runways of Sommerfeld Tracking were laid and a tarmac perimeter track constructed around the field. There were five hangars on the eastern and south-eastern side of the site; the control tower is still extant.

No. 15 (Pilots) Advanced Flying Unit RAF and No. 3 Flying Instructors School RAF was also present at some point.

The airfield functioned for seven years before being decommissioned on 18 October 1948.

== Current use ==
The perimeter track of the airfield was opened to motor racing in 1950 as Castle Combe Circuit.

== See also ==
- List of former Royal Air Force stations
