= Tiddleywink =

Hamlet in Wiltshire, England

Coordinates: 51.4808°N 2.1858°W

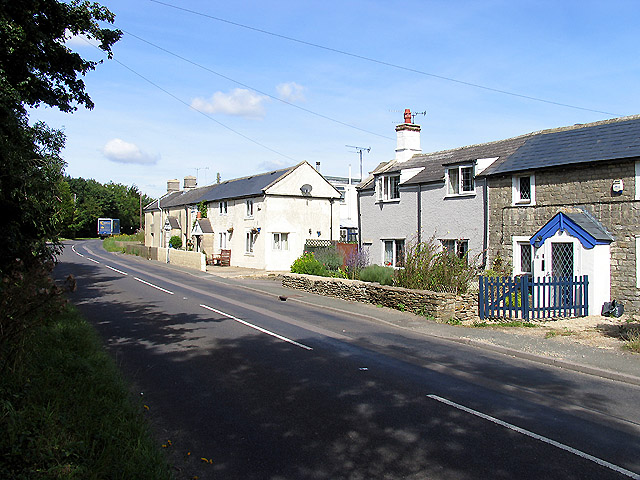

- Location within Wiltshire
- OS grid reference: ST872758
- Civil parish: Yatton Keynell
- Unitary authority: Wiltshire
- Ceremonial county: Wiltshire
- Region: South West
- Country: England
- Sovereign state: United Kingdom
- Post town: CHIPPENHAM
- Postcode district: SN14
- Dialling code: 01249
- Police: Wiltshire
- Fire: Dorset and Wiltshire
- Ambulance: South Western
- UK Parliament: South Cotswolds

Tiddleywink is a hamlet consisting of eight cottages on the B4039 road, near the village of Yatton Keynell, about 3 miles (4.8 km) northwest of Chippenham, Wiltshire, England. The name is said to derive from rhyming slang for "a quick drink", one of its cottages historically being known to serve beer to passing cattle drovers.

Because of its small size, Tiddleywink has been for many years omitted from the official book of place names, the Collins British Atlas and Gazetteer, and from most maps. It has been shown, however, that it was recognised as a settlement in the 1881 census, when it had a total of 28 residents.

Early in 2003, after much campaigning, residents won their settlement two new road signs and widespread recognition as their story made the national news.
