= Castle Combe =

Village and civil parish in Wiltshire, England

Coordinates: 51°29′35″N 2°13′44″W

- Village and civil parish
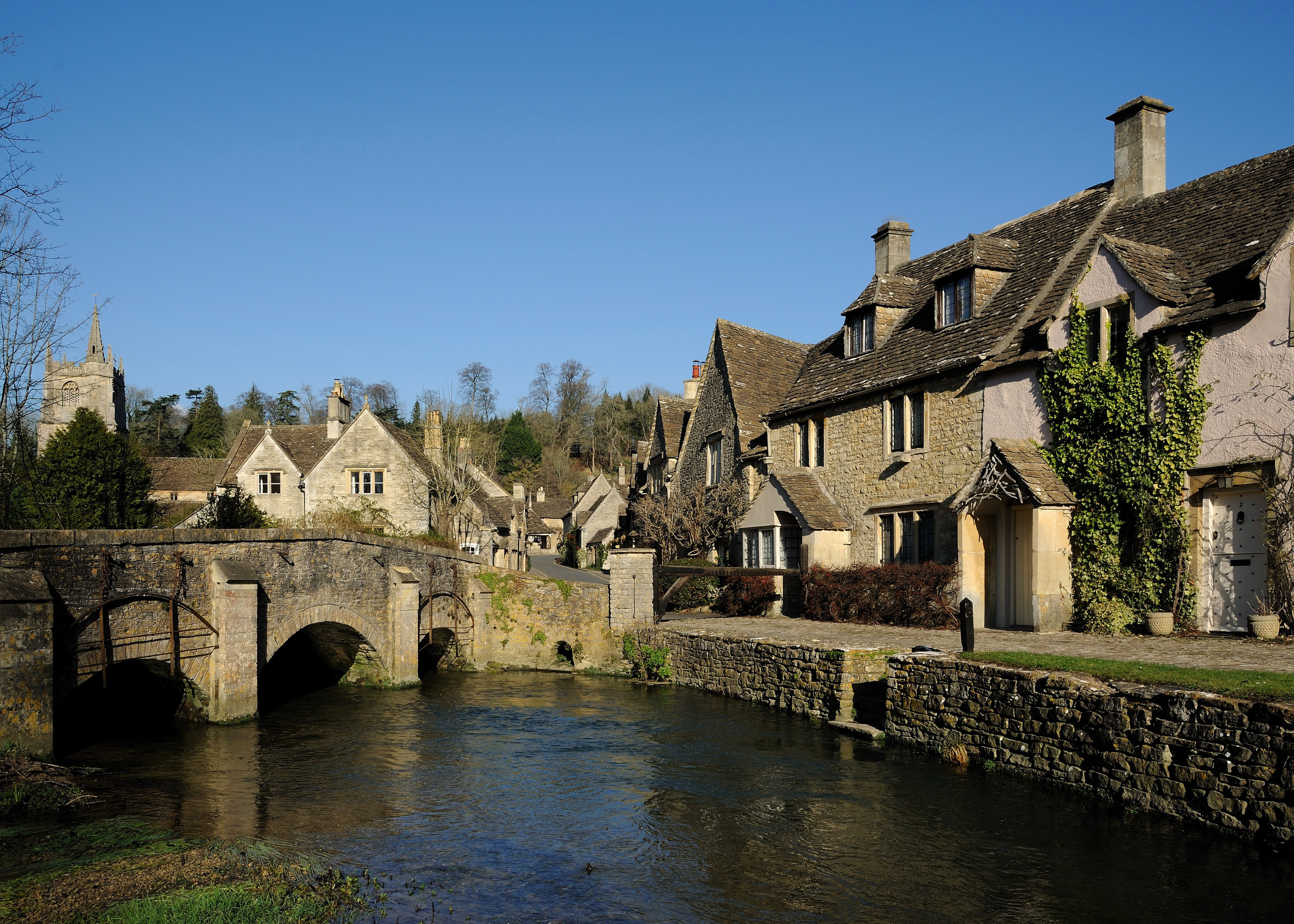
- The main street and Bybrook River

- Location within Wiltshire
- Population: 356 (2021)
- OS grid reference: ST842771
- Unitary authority: Wiltshire
- Ceremonial county: Wiltshire
- Region: South West
- Country: England
- Sovereign state: United Kingdom
- Post town: Chippenham
- Postcode district: SN14
- Dialling code: 01249
- Police: Wiltshire
- Fire: Dorset and Wiltshire
- Ambulance: South Western
- UK Parliament: South Cotswolds
- Website: Parish Council

Castle Combe is a village and civil parish in Wiltshire, England. The village is around 5 miles (8 km) north-west of Chippenham and 10 miles (16 km) north-east of Bath. At the 2021 census, the parish had a population of 356.

Castle Combe is within the Cotswolds Area of Outstanding Natural Beauty and is a popular tourist attraction. With its cluster of Cotswold stone cottages and lack of modern buildings – no new houses have been built in the historic centre of the village since about 1600 – the village has been described as a "chocolate box", a "tourist honeypot", and "the prettiest village in England".

The village is in two parts: one is in the narrow valley of By Brook, while Upper Castle Combe is on higher land to the east, on the B4039 road connecting Chippenham and Chipping Sodbury. South of the upper village is the Castle Combe motor racing circuit. A castle once stood in the area, but was demolished centuries ago.

== History ==
A Roman villa once stood about 3 mi (5 km) from the village, indicating Roman occupation of the area. The site has been excavated on at least three occasions, the first by George Poulett Scrope in 1852 and the most recent in 2010. Some reports refer to the site as the North Wraxall or the Truckle Hill villa. Evidence of a bath house and corn drying ovens were found, the latter from the 4th century. The villa itself apparently contained 16 rooms, and there were additional buildings and a cemetery. Neolithic flint tools and Iron Age brooches were also discovered not far from the villa, in 1985.

The settlement was listed in the Domesday Book of 1086, with 33 households; the Lord was Humphrey de l'Isle.

The village takes its name from the 12th-century castle which stood about 1/3 mile (500 m) to the north. The site where the castle once stood now only contains the old earthworks and masonry, which are estimated to date from the 12th century. It is believed that the castle was constructed as the seat of the Barony of Combe under Reginald de Dunstanville either during the reign of Henry I or Henry II. Reginald was thought to support Empress Matilda during the Anarchy, and the castle was constructed during the wave of castle buildings of the Anarchy period.

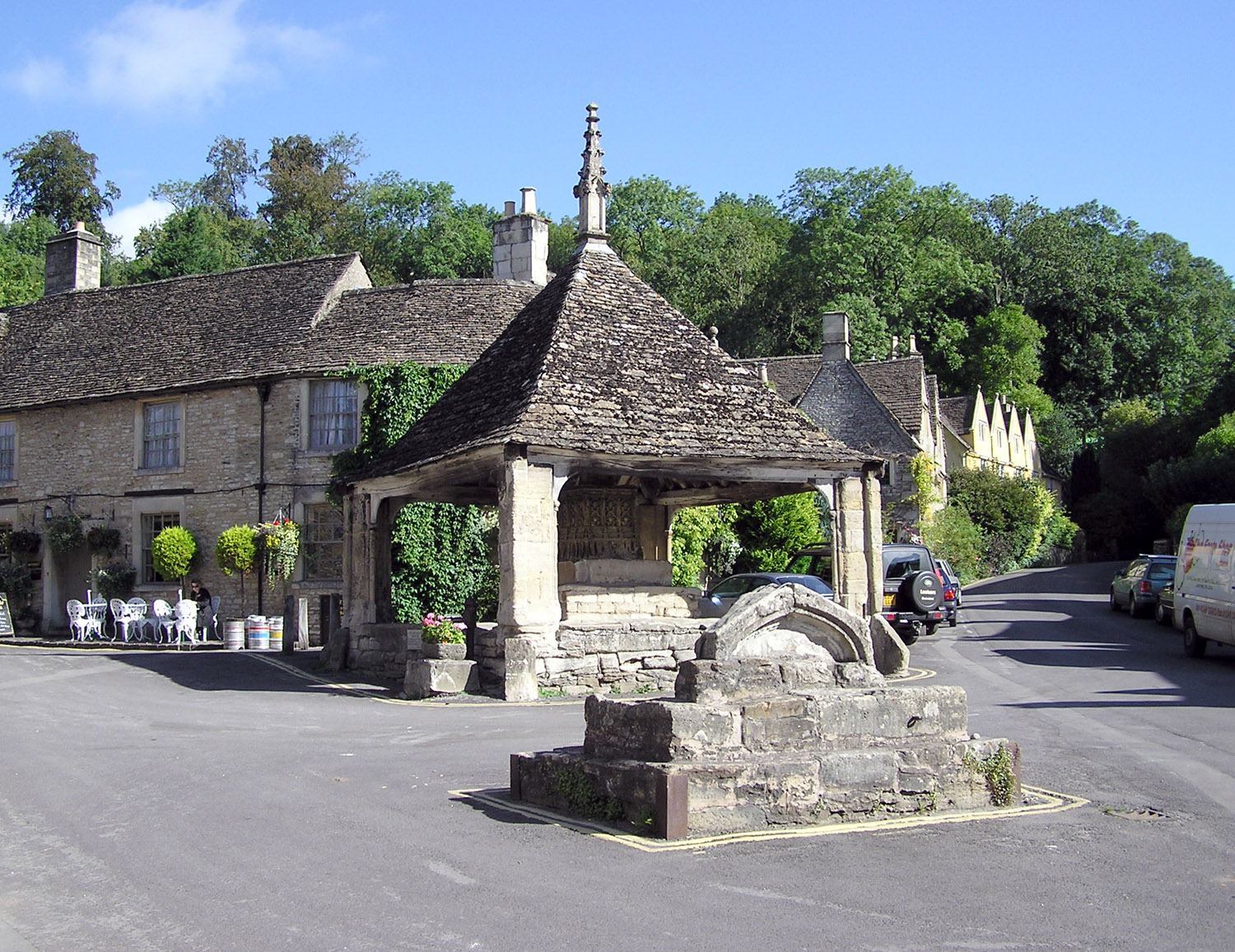
The market cross and the buttercross

The 14th-century market cross, erected when the right to hold a weekly market in Castle Combe was granted, stands where the three principal streets of the lower village converge. The Market Cross, a scheduled monument, reflects "the significance of the cloth industry in this area". Next to the cross is one of Castle Combe's two village pumps. Small stone steps near the cross were for horse riders to mount and dismount, and close by are the remains of the buttercross, built in the late 19th century from old masonry. This structure, also known as Weavers' Steps and 'the stone', is another scheduled monument.

During the 14th century, the seat of the Barony was transferred to the Manor House within Castle Combe village and a deer park was created next to the castle. The market town prospered during the 15th century when it belonged to Millicent, the wife of Sir Stephen Le Scrope and then of Sir John Fastolf (1380–1459), a Norfolk knight who was the effective lord of the manor for fifty years. By 1340, the village had a fulling mill, confirming the importance of wool by that time. Scrope promoted the woollen industry, supplying his own troops and others for Henry V's war in France. The parish was in the ancient hundred of Chippenham.

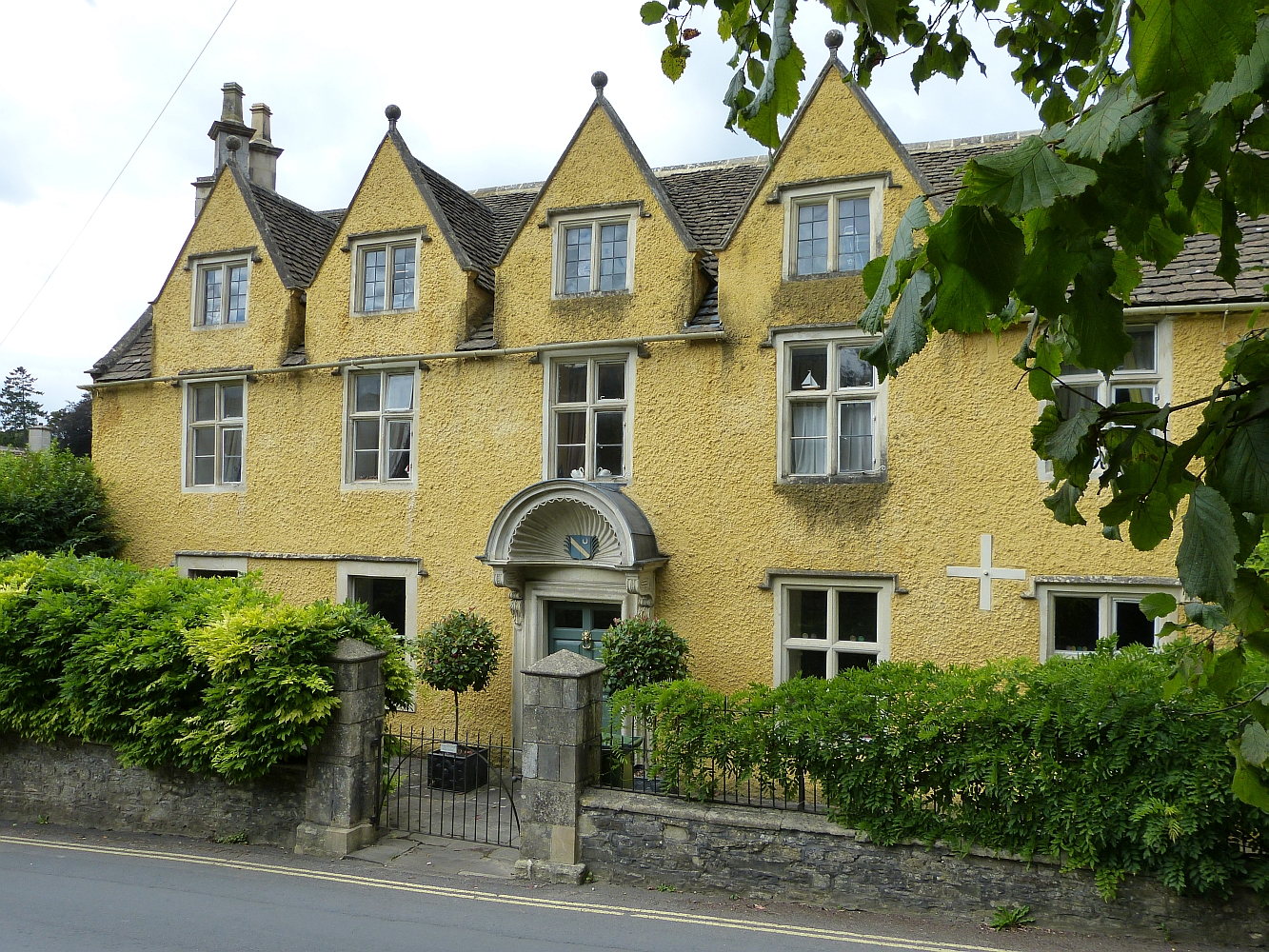
The Dower House

By the 17th century, John Aubrey stated that a market was held on the site of the old castle. At some time in the late 1700s, the level of the Bybrook River fell, so it could no longer be used to power mills. The cloth industry began leaving the area during that century; "industrial prosperity was over and the population decreased". Notable houses include the Dower House, from the late 17th century is now Grade II listed.

The village was owned by the Scrope family for over five centuries, until 1866 when it was sold to the Gorst family and Edward Chaddock Lowndes (who was previously also known as Gorst). The latter spent a great deal of money on improving the manor house and the estate.

A National School was built in 1826, on a site between the upper and lower villages. The school was taken over by the county council in 1909, and educated children of all ages until 1956 when older pupils were transferred to secondary schools in Chippenham. It closed in 1998 on the opening of a new primary school at Yatton Keynell.

During the Second World War, the RAF Castle Combe airfield was built east of the village, with runways, hangars and a control tower. Between 1946 and 1948 the airfield buildings were used as temporary housing for former military from Poland. The property was sold in 1948, and was later modified for motor racing; the tower is still used during races at Castle Combe Circuit.

For decades the village had a number of gristmills and sawmills but all went out of business; Nettleton Mill closed before 1916 and Gatcombe Mill closed circa 1925; both are Grade II listed. The Long Dean Mill shut down in 1956; the Lower mill is now Grade II listed; Colham Mill was demolished in 1962. The last remaining stone tower of the castle stood for centuries, but it too was demolished, in 1950.

== Listed buildings ==
Castle Combe parish has 107 listed buildings; nearly all are in the Grade II category.

== Religious sites ==
=== Parish church ===
The Church of England parish church of St Andrew is a Grade I listed building. Part of the chancel is 13th-century; in 1850–51 nearly all of the building, except the 15th-century tower, was taken down and reconstructed to the same plan.

=== Congregational Church ===
The first chapel was built in 1757 and extended with a schoolroom in 1846. The current church, opened in 1914, is in the upper part of the village on what is now the B4039 road. The building is a former malt house and is attached to an 18th-century house which became the manse. The church continues in use.

== In popular culture ==
The village was a location for the 1967 film musical Doctor Dolittle. Its frequently rainy summer climate frustrated production, as did attempted sabotage - including by British Army officer (and future explorer) Sir Ranulph Fiennes - because of residents' irritation at the producers' modifications of the area for shooting. Other productions include "The Murder of Roger Ackroyd", an episode of Agatha Christie's Poirot, and the films Stardust and The Wolfman. Throughout September 2010, the village was a filming location for Steven Spielberg's production of War Horse.

Raymond Austin set the action of his book Find me a Spy, Catch me a Traitor in the village and at the Manor. The house of Alice Cartalet in the manga and anime series Kiniro Mosaic was based on Fosse Farmhouse, a guesthouse near Castle Combe.

The village was a filming location for the fantasy adventure movie Mariah Mundi and the Midas Box in 2012, and later for a television adaptation of the Anthony Trollope novel Doctor Thorne.

The Apple TV+ spy thriller series Slow Horses filmed several episodes of its second series in Castle Combe and the nearby airfield, referring to the village as "Upshott."

== Tourist services ==
Castle Combe has a car park at the top of the hill, and toilet facilities over the bridge at the bottom of the village. A small museum closed in 2012.

The Manor House was built in the 17th century and rebuilt in the 19th. It has 48 rooms and 365 acres (148 ha) of gardens. During World War II, the house was used as a hospital. In 1947, the owner of the Castle Combe estate sold the houses and the estate and the Manor House became a country club. After 18 months, the club left the premises, and the house was shortly thereafter sold to Bobbie Allen, an amateur hotelier, and her husband. Mrs Allen wrote a book of her experiences, From Claridge's to Castle Combe. The property was owned by the Allen family for some time, and they sold the Manor House to Mr and Mrs Oliver Clegg who (some time after 1976) sold it to the corporation which now owns the property. By the time it was listed as a Grade II property in 1960, it was already operating as a hotel.
