= Castle Combe Circuit =

British racing circuit in England

- Full Circuit with Chicanes (1998–present)
- Location: Castle Combe, Wiltshire
- Coordinates: 51°29′23″N 2°12′45″W
- Opened: July 1950; 75 years ago
- Major events: Former: FIM EWC (1965); Sidecar World Championship (2006); TCR UK (2018, 2021–2022); British GT (2001–2005); British F3 (1951–1955, 1962, 1964–1965, 1970–1971, 1973, 2001–2005); BOSS Formula (1997); European F5000 (1970–1971)

Full Circuit with Chicanes (1998–present)
- Length: 2.977 km (1.850 mi)
- Turns: 12
- Race lap record: 0:58.596 ( (United Kingdom) Stefano Leaney, Dallara F317, 2021, F3)

Original Circuit (1950–1997)
- Length: 2.961 km (1.840 mi)
- Turns: 8
- Race lap record: 0:50.590 ( (United Kingdom) Nigel Greensall, Tyrrell 022, 1997, F1)

Castle Combe Circuit is a motor racing circuit in Wiltshire, England, approximately 20-mile (32 km) from Bristol. The circuit is based on the perimeter track of a former World War II airfield, and was opened for racing in 1950.

== History ==
The Castle Combe airfield opened in May 1941 on land of the Castle Combe estate, owned by the Gorst family, and operated as RAF Castle Combe for seven years before being decommissioned in 1948. During the war, the airfield was a training ground for pilots. From 1946 to 1948 the buildings served as a resettlement camp for Polish ex-service personnel. The property was returned to the Gorst family in 1948; with the Bristol Motorcycle & Light Car Club, they organized the first race in July 1950. By 1955 the property was divided and sold. Between 1956 and 1961, the circuit was used for motorcycle racing. Some years later, the circuit was converted to motor racing.

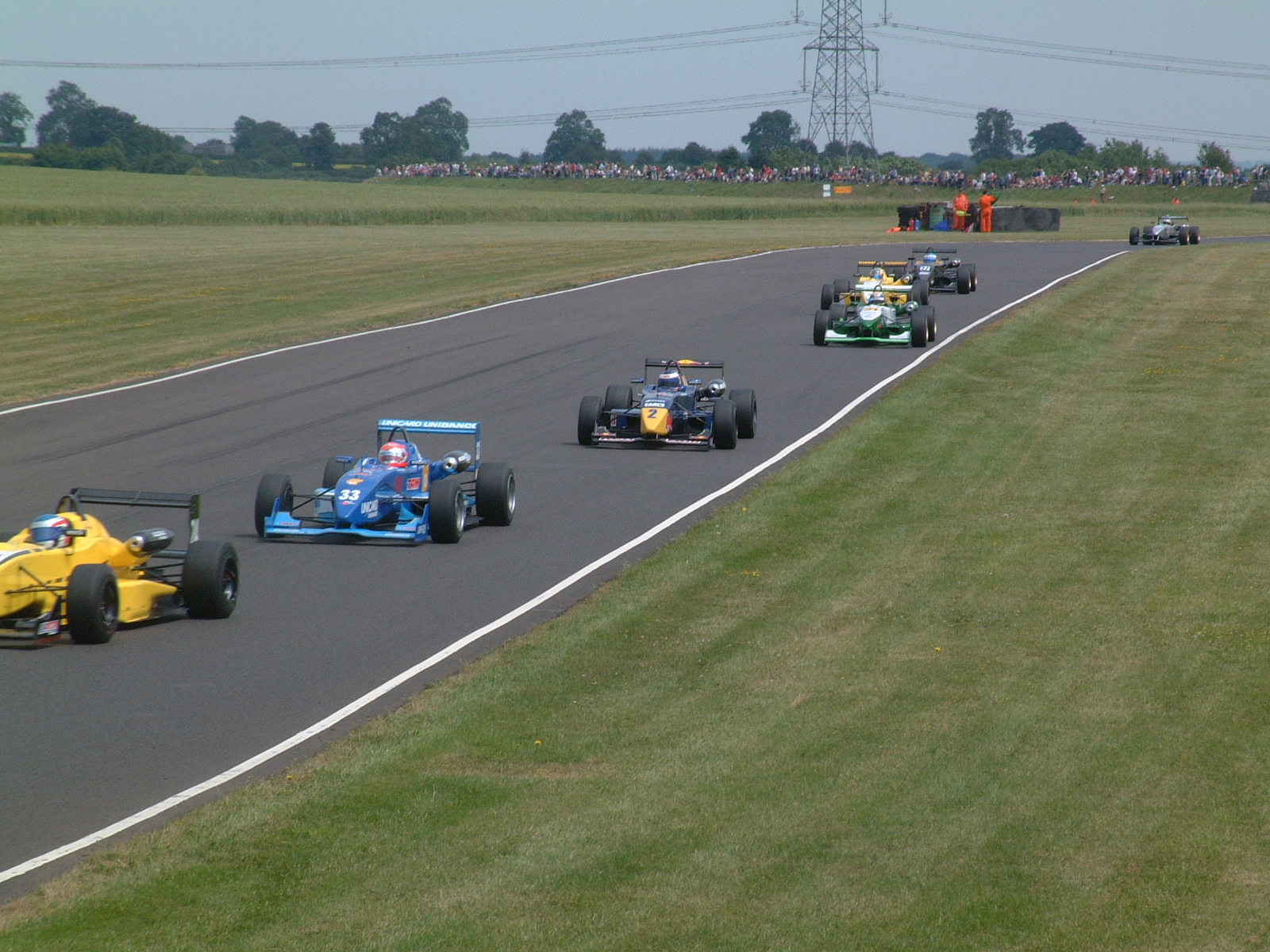
British Formula Three cars in 2003

Castle Combe has staged several motorsport disciplines over the years. In 1997, Nigel Greensall established a lap record when his Tyrrell 022 lapped the circuit at 130.93 mph (210.71 km/h). However, this was the last year that the circuit would remain unaltered: an accident involving the death of a spectator led to the owners installing two new chicanes in order to slow the cars down. The new layout was slightly longer at 1.850 mi (2.977 km), and was completed over the winter of 1998–1999.

Formula Three returned to Castle Combe in 2001. However, in 2005, the circuit was issued with a noise nuisance order. The British Formula Three Championship and the British GT Championship were both louder than permitted, and so were prevented from returning.

== Present ==
Races include a home-circuit championship with classes for saloon cars, sports cars and GTs, and Formula Ford. Racing clubs from around the UK include the track in the events for their championships, including the 750 Motor Club and BRSCC. Once a year, motorcycle racing takes place over two days during the summer. The weekend includes a sidecar championship and an historic race, as well as the more modern supersport races.

As well as holding trackdays for both cars and motorcycles, Castle Combe Circuit holds a large number of car shows. These shows follow a general motorsport theme and exhibit show stands, market stalls, stunt demonstrations, classic displays and on certain days the circuit is able to hold track sessions. Since 2001, Rallyday, an annual demonstration event for rally cars, has also been held. Motoring shows Top Gear and Fifth Gear have used the circuit to race or test cars on.

The Under 17 Car Club have been using the track since 1976 to host events where members of the club learn to drive from the age of 11. The club transform the track into driving circuits with roundabouts and motorway sections. The club also hold their annual Magic Day at Combe to raise money for the Teenage Cancer Trust.

The circuit hosts a Greenpower event, one round in a series held at various racetrack-type venues. When not in use for racing, the circuit is the venue for a regular car boot sale that has become one of the biggest in the South West. In May it also hosts an annual steam rally.

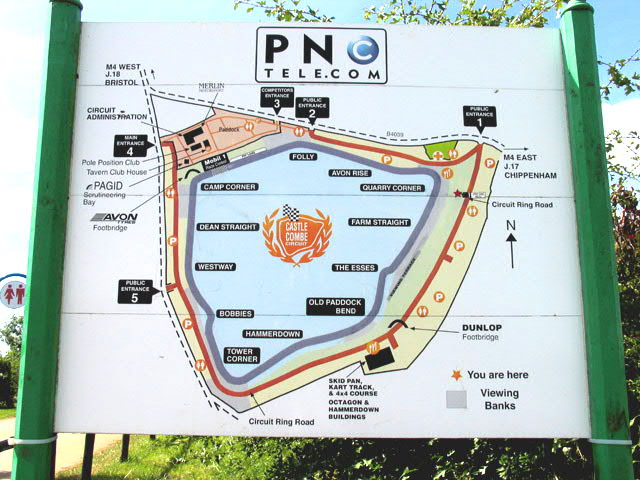
Track layout

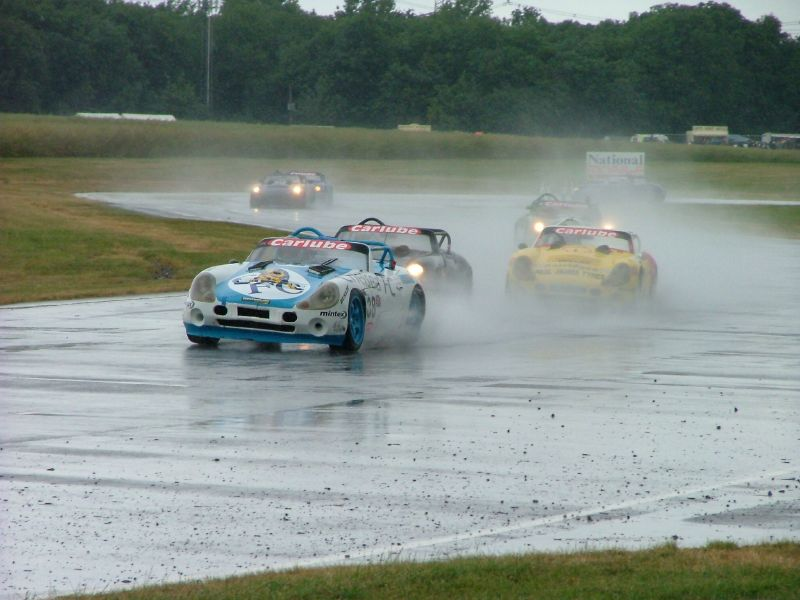
Wet race in 2004

== Lap records ==
Max Chilton held the overall unofficial track record with a lap of 0:54.559 with McMurtry Spéirling PURE VP1 in a private testing session in April 2024. As of August 2022, the fastest official race lap records at Castle Combe Circuit are listed as:

Category	Time	Driver	Vehicle	Event
Full Circuit with Chicanes (1998–present): 1.850 mi (2.977 km)
Formula Three	0:58.596	Stefano Leaney	Dallara F317	2021 Castle Combe MSV F3 Cup round
Formula Palmer Audi	1:03.747	Jason Moore	Formula Palmer Audi car	2007 Castle Combe Formula Palmer Audi round
GT1 (GTS)	1:04.254	Steve Warnock	Lister Storm GT	2002 Castle Combe British GT round
GT3	1:04.355	Lucky Khera	Lamborghini Huracán GT3	2022 Castle Combe GT round
Silhouette racing car	1:04.959	Craig Dolby	Volvo S60 6200	2018 Castle Combe GT round
LMP675	1:05.021	Ian Heward	Rapier 6 SR2	2011 Castle Combe Britcar GT round
GT2	1:05.723	Nathan Kinch	Ferrari 360 Modena GTC	2005 Castle Combe British GT round
TCR Touring Car	1:07.066	Chris Smiley	Honda Civic Type R TCR (FK8)	2022 Castle Combe TCR UK round
Original Circuit (1950–1997): 1.840 mi (2.961 km)
Formula One	0:50.590	Nigel Greensall	Tyrrell 022	1997 Castle Combe BOSS Formula Series round
Formula 5000	0:56.600	Peter Gethin (Note: Both drivers took the same lap time independently in the same race.); Howden Ganley	McLaren M10B	1970 Castle Combe F5000 round
Group 6	1:03.400	Jeremy Lord	Lola T212	1973 Castle Combe MN GT round
Group 7	1:03.800	Alistair Cowin	McLaren M6B/12	1970 Castle Combe SKF GT round
Group 4	1:04.400	Ron Fry	Ford GT40	1968 Castle Combe Special GT race
Group 3	1:10.000	Ron Fry	Ferrari 250 LM	1965 BARC Castle Combe Handicap race
Clubman	1:15.200	Jeremy Lord	Mallock U2	1965 Castle Combe SMC [Sports/Clubman] race
Formula Two	1:16.200	Bob Gerard	Cooper T23	1953 Joe Fry Memorial Trophy
