= Haripura =

Village in Gujarat, India

Tapti River at Haripura in Surat district, in 2006.

Haripura is a village located near Kadod town in the Surat district of Gujarat, India. It is around 13 kilometres north east of Bardoli. During the Indian independence movement, it was the venue of annual session of the Indian National Congress in 1938, referred as the 'Haripura Session'.

Haripura is surrounded by villages including Mori, Samthan, Kadod, and Kosadi.

== Geography ==
Haripura is located on the banks of the Tapti River.

== History ==
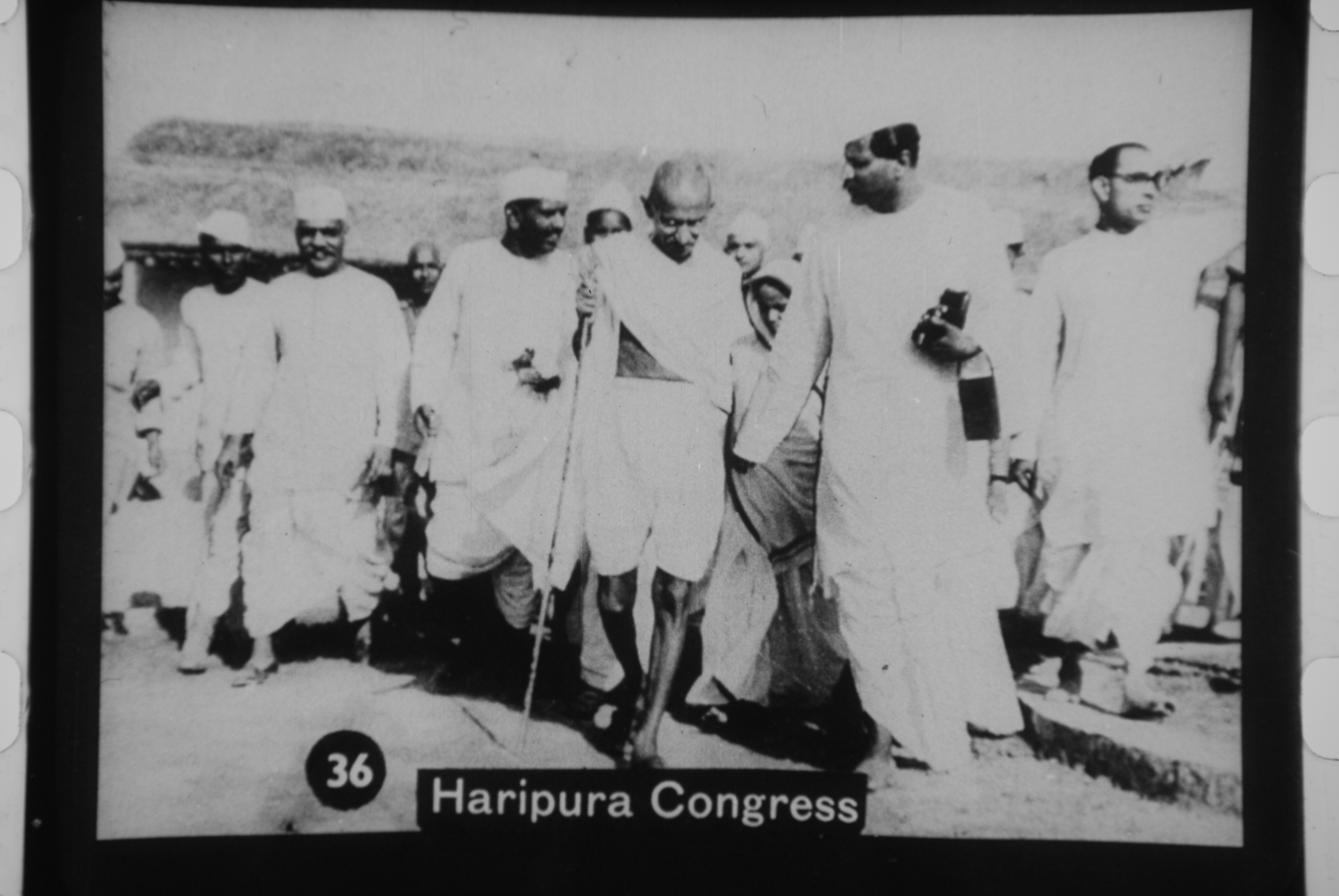
Mahatma Gandhi at the 'Haripura Session' of the Indian National Congress

Haripura was safe because of its geographical height during the 1968 Tapti flood.

The Indian National Congress met at Haripura during 19 to 22 February 1938, under the presidency of Subhas Chandra Bose; He was elected President of the Haripura Congress Session in 1938. Sardar Vallabhbhai Patel had selected Haripura for the convention. 51 Bullocks'chariot was decorated and sent for this very occasion by the then Maharajasaheb Shri Indrasinhji Pratapsinhji Solanki of Vansda state. Noted painter, Nandalal Bose also created a set of seven posters at the request of Mahatma Gandhi for the Haripura Session, while film director, JBH Wadia, of Wadia Movietone Studio, made a feature-length documentary of the Haripura Congress.Hari Singh Nalva, a Sikh General also established a city Haripur after his name in 1822 CE.

== Visitor's attractions ==
A Krishna temple and a statue of Subhas Chandra Bose are located in this village.

== Gallery ==
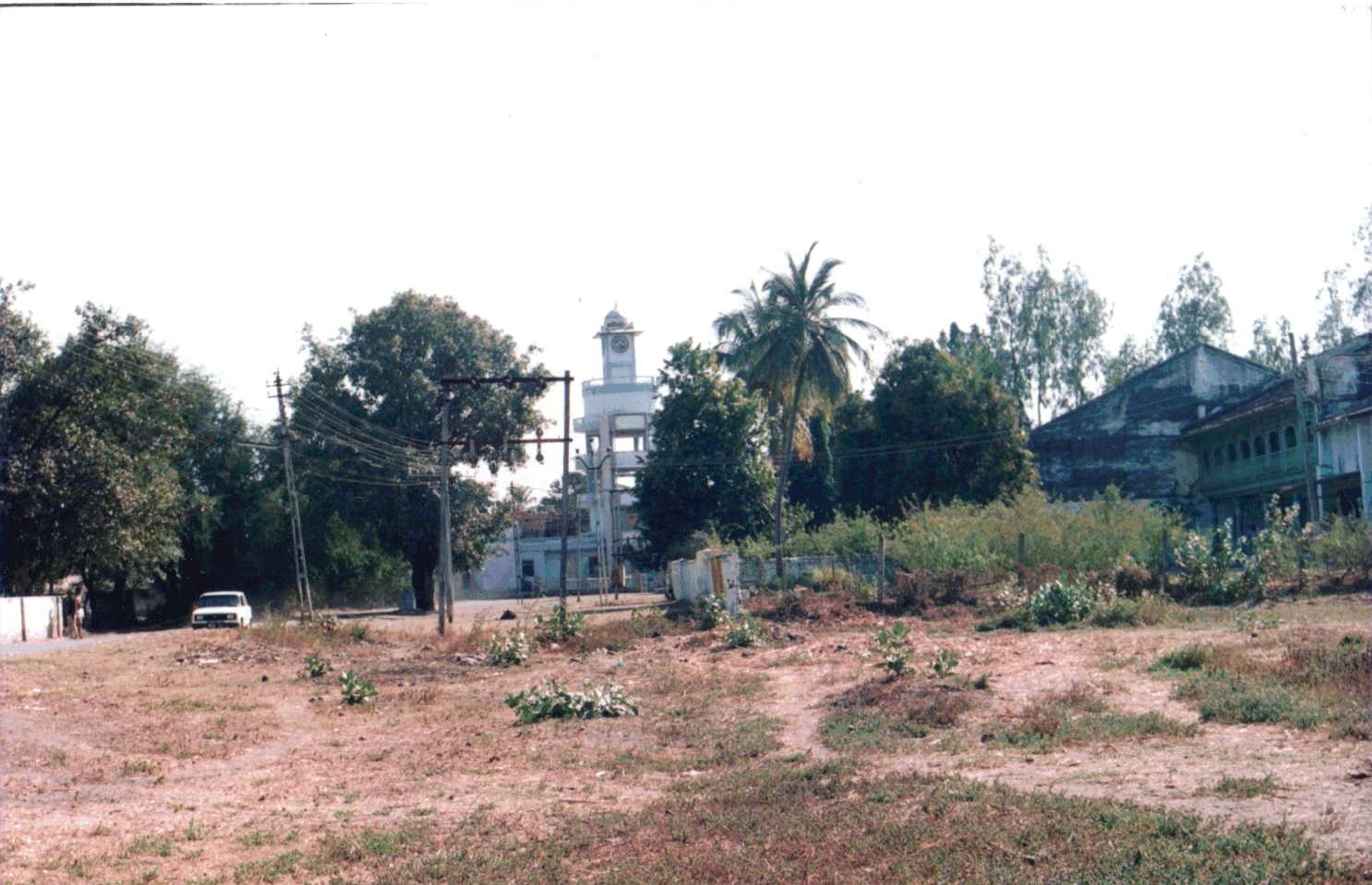
Haripura in the 1970s

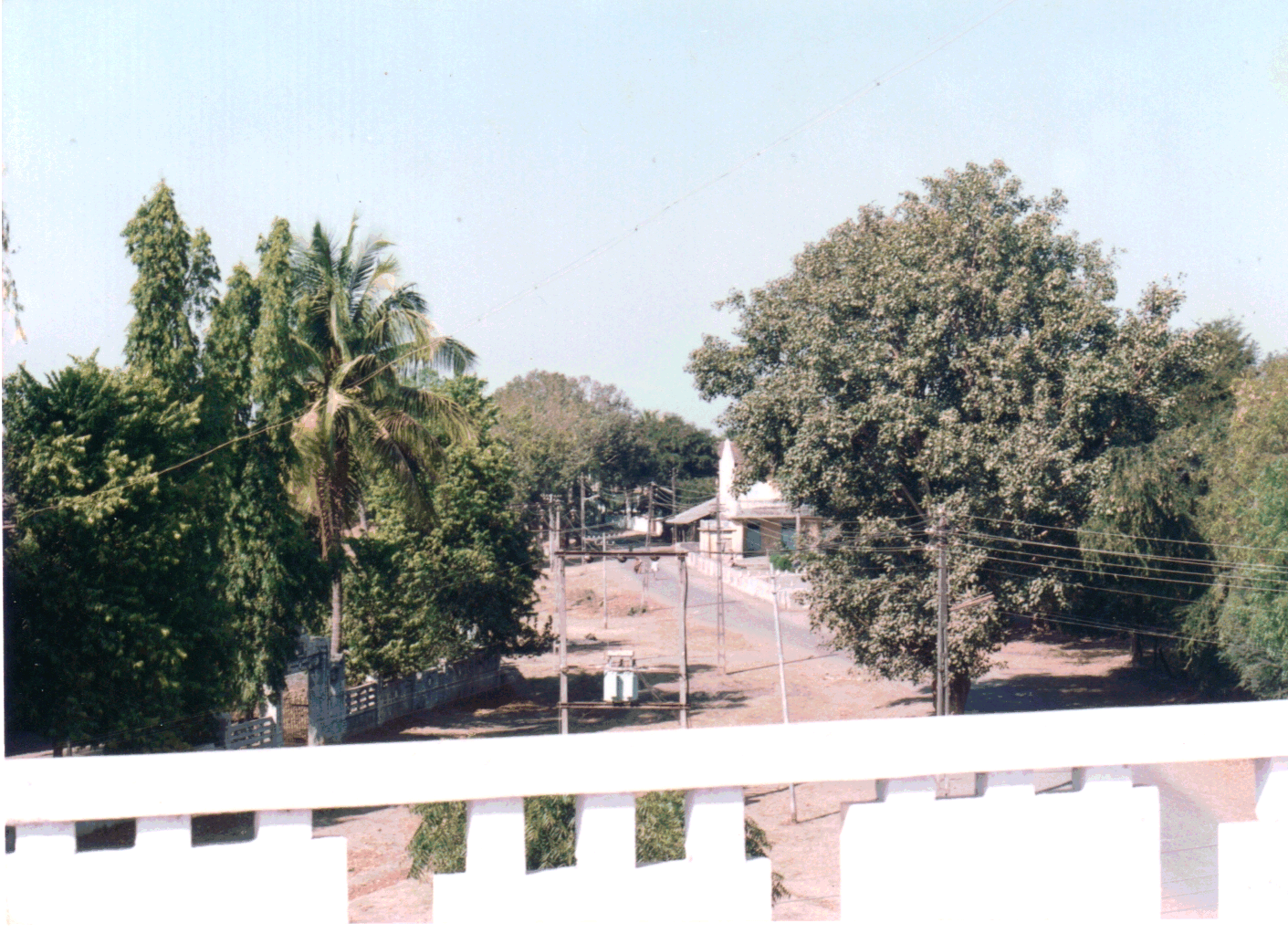
Haripura in the 1970s

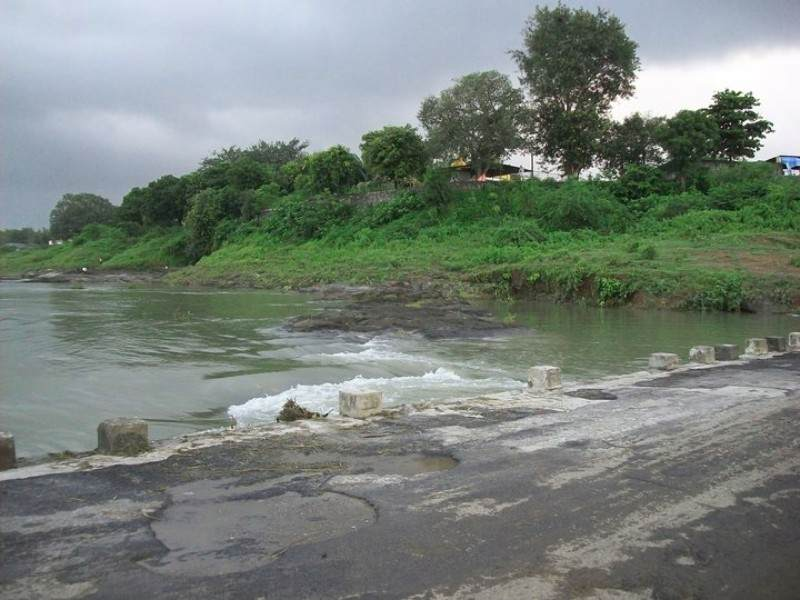
Haripura in the 2000s

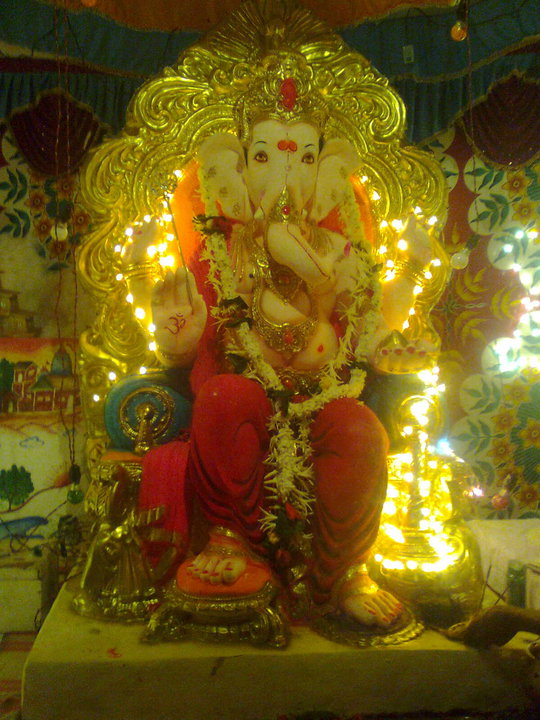

== See also ==
- List of tourist attractions in Surat
