= Bardoli Assembly constituency =

Legislative Assembly constituency in Gujarat State, India

Coordinates: 21.13°N 73.11°E

Bardoli
- Constituency No. 169 for the Gujarat Legislative Assembly

Constituency details
- Country: India
- Region: Western India
- State: Gujarat
- District: Surat
- Lok Sabha constituency: Bardoli
- Established: 1972
- Total electors: 270,071
- Reservation: SC

Member of Legislative Assembly
- 15th Gujarat Legislative Assembly
- Incumbent Ishwarbhai Parmar
- Party: Bharatiya Janata Party
- Elected year: 2022

Bardoli is one of the 182 Legislative Assembly constituencies of Gujarat state in India. It is part of Surat district and is reserved for candidates belonging to the Scheduled Castes.

== List of segments ==
This assembly seat represents the following segments,

1. Bardoli Taluka (Part) Villages – Mota, Movachhi, Moti Falod, Bharampor, Vaghecha Kadod, Bhamaiya, Uchharel, Haripura, Kadod, Singod, Bamni, Samthan, Kantali, Pardi Kadod, Ruwa, Varad, Isanpor, Kharvasa, Umrakh, Baben, Astan, Panada, Rajpura Lumbha, Rayam, Khoj, Palsod, Akoti, Orgam, Sankri, Dhamdod Lumbha, Ten, Nadida, Khali, Tajpor Khurd, Utara, Afva, Isroli, Tajpore Bujrang, Goji, Bamroli, Ninat, Pathradiya, Nizar, Babla, Sarbhon, Bhuvasan, Zakharda, Ancheli, Vadoli, Naugama, Vaghech Sarbhon, Pardi Vagha, Tarbhon, Kuvadiya, Chhitra, Kharad, Bardoli (M)
2. Palsana Taluka
3. Choryasi Taluka (Part) Villages- Vedchha, Sabargam, Kumbharia, Devadh, Dakhkhanvada, Deladva, Mohni, Timbarva, Goja, Khambhasla, Bonand, Ravla (Vaktana), Bhatia, Vanz, Lajpor, Popda, Kapletha, Kachholi, Samrod.

== Members of the Legislative Assembly ==
Year	Member	Picture	Party
2007	Kunvarjibhai Halpati		Indian National Congress
2012	Ishwarbhai Parmar		Bharatiya Janata Party
2017	Ishwarbhai Parmar		Bharatiya Janata Party
2022	Ishwarbhai Parmar		Bharatiya Janata Party

== Election results ==
=== 2022 ===
Gujarat Assembly Election, 2022
Party	Candidate	Votes	%	±%
BJP	Ishwarbhai Parmar	118,527	66.14	+7.69
INC	Pannaben Patel	28,579	15.95	−21.07
AAP	Rajendraprasad Solanki (Raju Morthana)	24,710	13.79	New
Majority			50.19	
Turnout		179194		
BJP hold		Swing		

=== 2017 ===
Gujarat Assembly Election, 2017: Bardoli
Party	Candidate	Votes	%	±%
BJP	Ishwarbhai Parmar	94,774	58.55	+4.29
INC	Tarunkumar Vaghela	59,920	37.02	−2.33
Majority		34,854	21.53	+6.62
Turnout		1,61,859	71.80	−2.81
Registered electors		225,423		
BJP hold		Swing		

=== 2012 ===
Gujarat Assembly Election, 2012
Party	Candidate	Votes	%	±%
BJP	Ishwarbhai Parmar	81049	54.26	
INC	Nitinbhai Rana	58777	39.35	
Majority		22272	14.91	
Turnout		149369	74.51	
BJP gain from INC		Swing		

== See also ==
- List of constituencies of the Gujarat Legislative Assembly
- Surat district
- Gujarat Legislative Assembly
