= Eklera =

Coordinates: 22°43′N 76°18′E

- village
- Interactive map of Eklera
- Country: India
- State: Gujarat
- District: Surat

Languages
  - Official: Gujarati, Hindi
- Time zone: UTC+5:30 (IST)
- Vehicle registration: GJ-

Eklera is a small Muslim farming village located in the district of Surat, Gujarat, India. It is about 15 kilometres (9.3 mi) from the Arabian Sea coast and less than 4 kilometres (2.5 mi) from Surat City Municipal Boundary. Its nearest railhead is Bhestan in Surat. Eklera has a population of about 1200 people, the vast majority being Sunni Surti Vohra and a small number of Tribal Hindus. Approximately a quarter of the population (Sunni Surti Vohras) are settled abroad including the UK mainly London, Dewsbury, Batley, Botswana, Panama, South Africa, Canada, New Zealand. Most of the families are engaged in agriculture. The smaller adjacent village of Bhanodra is often counted within Eklera.

Eklera has one mosque, one school, a water-works, a mill and a dairy. There are also some small shops supplying essentials to the villagers and also to the passing trade. In 2007 both Eklera and Bhanodra embarked on a major mosque construction project including a four-storey madrassah (Islamic supplementary school) which will also include a pharmacy and a multi-functional hall. The finances for the project were raised mostly from non-resident Indians.

There are three major roads connecting the village with nearby Unn, Sachin and Bhestan. The relative prosperity of the village has also increased substantially in recent times due to the high land prices in the village and because of the return of many former NRIs (Non-resident Indian and Person of Indian Origin) and thus their contributions to the village's welfare. The NRIs play a crucial role in the socio-economic development of the two villages. Regular remittances to families and the wider community enable the village 'panchayat' to carry out improvements in infrastructure. The village has set up special funds providing vital assistance to poor villagers, regardless of their background, who cannot afford to pay for their medical care.
