= Choryasi Assembly constituency =

Legislative Assembly constituency in Gujarat State, India

Coordinates: 21.31°N 72.96°E

Choryasi
- Constituency No. 168 for the Gujarat Legislative Assembly

Constituency details
- Country: India
- Region: Western India
- State: Gujarat
- District: Surat
- Lok Sabha constituency: Navsari
- Established: 1962
- Total electors: 566,545
- Reservation: None

Member of Legislative Assembly
- 15th Gujarat Legislative Assembly
- Incumbent Desai Sandeep Jayntibhai
- Party: Bharatiya Janata Party
- Elected year: 2022

Choryasi (Surat) is one of the 182 Legislative Assembly constituencies of Gujarat state in India. It is part of Surat district.

== List of segments ==
This assembly seat represents the following segments,

1. Choryasi Taluka (Part) Villages – Bhatlai, Rajgari, Sunvali, Mora, Kavas, Bhatpor, Kidiabet, Bhatha, Rundh, Magdalla, Gaviyar, Vanta, Dumas, Hajira, Sultanabad, Bhimpor, Sarsana, Abhva, Khajod, Bhimrad, Jiav, Sonari, Karadva, Saniya Kanade, Eklera, Bhanodra, Gabheni, Budia, Talangpor, Pardi Kanade, Kharvasa, Pali, Umber, Kansad, Bamroli, Palanpor, Bharthan, Vadod, Gadodara, Dindoli, Vesu, Pal, Ichchhapor (CT), Parvat (CT), Limla (CT), Hajira (INA), Un (CT), Sachin (CT), Sachin (INA)

== Member of Legislative Assembly ==
Year	Member	Picture	Party
2017	Patel Zankhana Hiteshkumar		Bharatiya Janata Party
2022	Sandip Desai		Bharatiya Janata Party

== Election results ==
=== 2022 ===
2022 Gujarat Legislative Assembly election: Choryasi
Party	Candidate	Votes	%	±%
BJP	Sandip Desai	2,36,033	73.12	+5.11
AAP	Prakashbhai Contractor	49,615	15.37	New
INC	Kantilal Nanubhai Patel	25,840	8.01	−16.66
Majority		1,86,418	57.75	
Turnout		3,22,785		
BJP hold		Swing		

=== 2017 ===
Gujarat Assembly Election, 2017: Choryasi
Party	Candidate	Votes	%	±%
BJP	Zankhana Patel	173,882	68.01	
INC	Yogesh Patel	63,063	24.67	
Independent	Ajay Chaudhari	9,708	3.80	New
Majority		1,10,819	43.34	
Turnout		2,55,678	61.32	
Registered electors		416,953		
BJP hold		Swing		

=== 2012 ===
Gujarat Assembly Election, 2012
Party	Candidate	Votes	%	±%
BJP	Rajabhai Patel	1,19,917	62.67	
INC	Satishbhai Patel	52,279	27.32	
Independent	Prakashbhai Contractor	5,906	3.09	
Majority		67,638	35.35	
Turnout		1,91,338	62.85	
BJP hold		Swing		

=== 2007 ===
Gujarat Assembly Election, 2007
Party	Candidate	Votes	%	±%
BJP	Narottambhai Trikamdas Patel	5,84,098	68.60	
INC	Janakbhai Govindbhai Dhanani	2,37,158	27.86	
SS	Avinash Vadivakar	2,260	0.27	
Majority		3,46,940	40.74	
Turnout		8,51,398		
BJP hold		Swing		

== See also ==
- List of constituencies of the Gujarat Legislative Assembly
- Surat district
- Gujarat Legislative Assembly
