= Vachhavad =

- Village
- Location in Gujarat, India
- Coordinates: 21.12°N 73.12°E
- Country: India
- State: Gujarat
- District: Surat
- Taluka: Mahuva

Government
  - Type: Vachhavad Gram panchayat
  - Body: Sarapanch

Area
  - Total: 7 km^{2} (2.7 sq mi)
- Elevation: 22 m (72 ft)

Population (2011)
  - Total: 832
  - Density: 120/km^{2} (310/sq mi)

Languages
  - Official: Gujarati, Dhodia
- Time zone: UTC+5:30 (IST)
- PIN: 394250
- Website: www.facebook.com/Vachhavad

Vachhavad is a village in Mahuva Taluka, Surat District, Gujarat State, India. Vachhavad is 55 km from the district capital, Surat, and 317 km from the state capital Gandhinagar.

== Geography ==
Vachhavad is located at around 21.12°N, 73.13°E.

== Landmarks ==
- Vachhavad Dudh Mandali
- Vachhavad Primary School
- Vachhavad Bal Mandir (આંગણ વાડી કેન્દ્ર)
- Vachhavad Community Hall
- Jalaram Bapa Temple
- Panchayat & Mantri Ghar

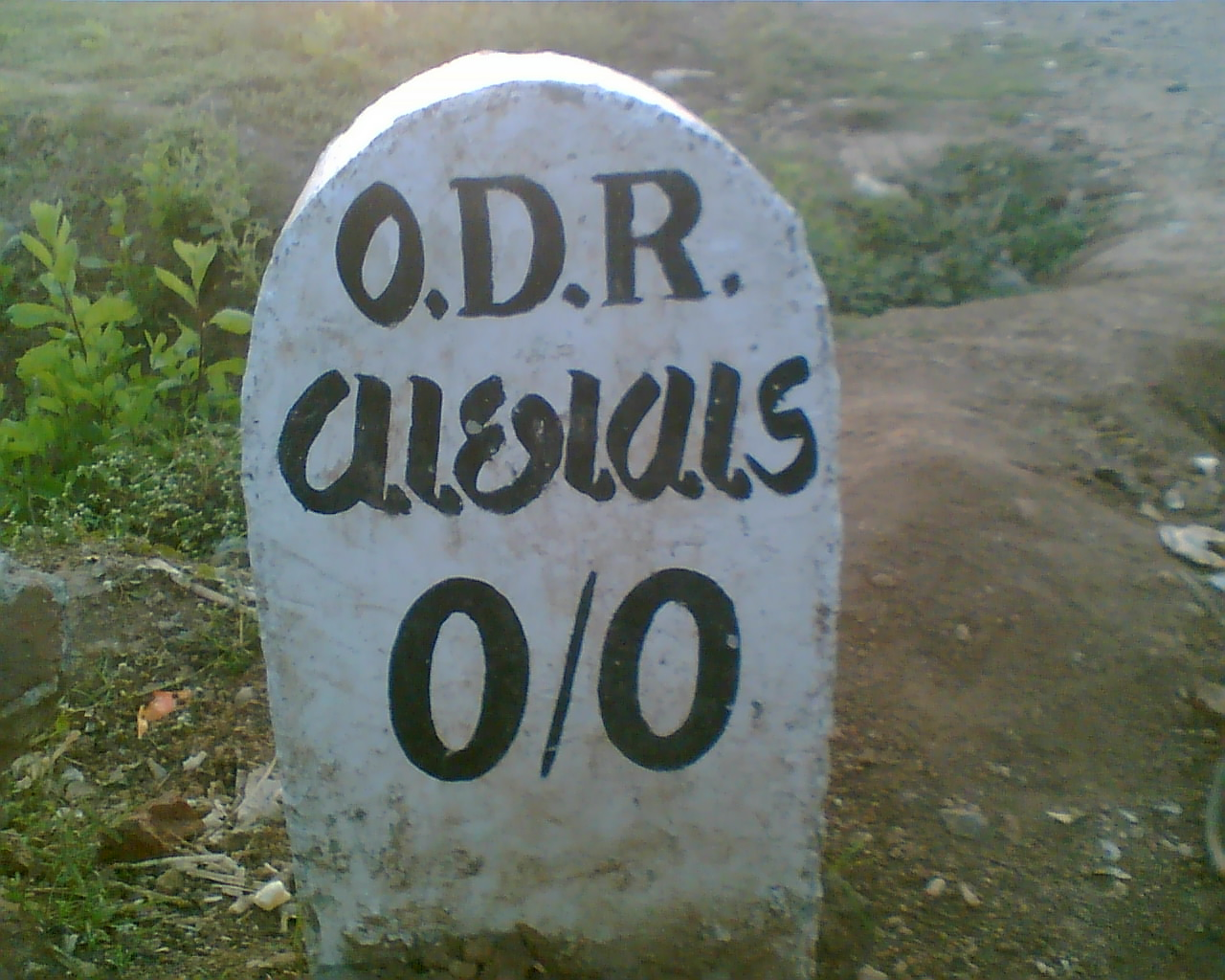
Vachhavad Logo

== Streets (Faliyu) ==
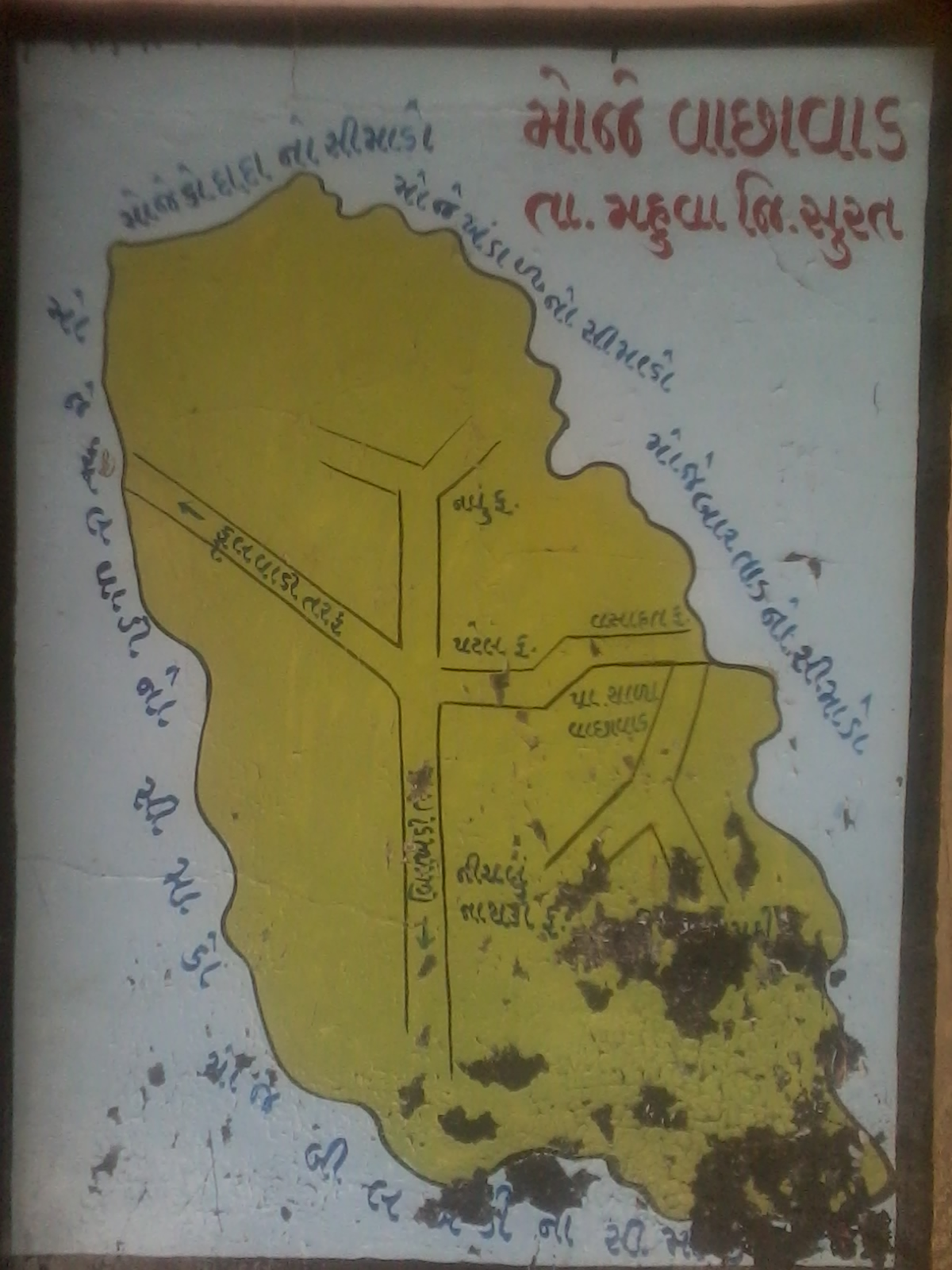
Vachhavad Map

- Navu Faliyu
- Patel Faliyu
- Brahman Faliyu
- Nichalu Nayki Faliyu
- Uplu Nayki Faliyu

== Temples ==
There are four temples in Vachhavad.

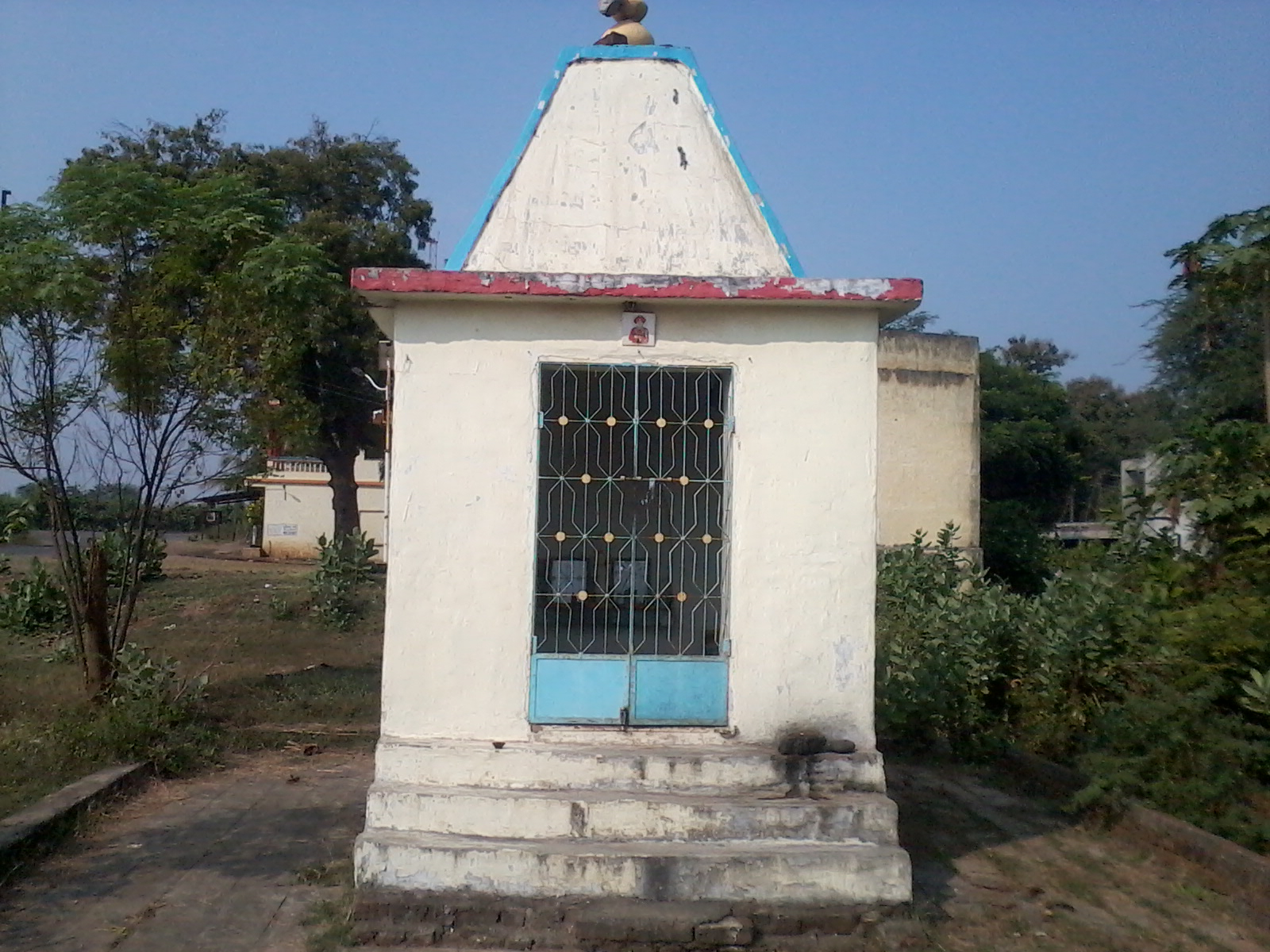
Jalaram Bapa Temple

=== Jalaram Bapa Temple ===
This temple is situated near Dudh Mandali. It was built by the Mandir Faliya people.

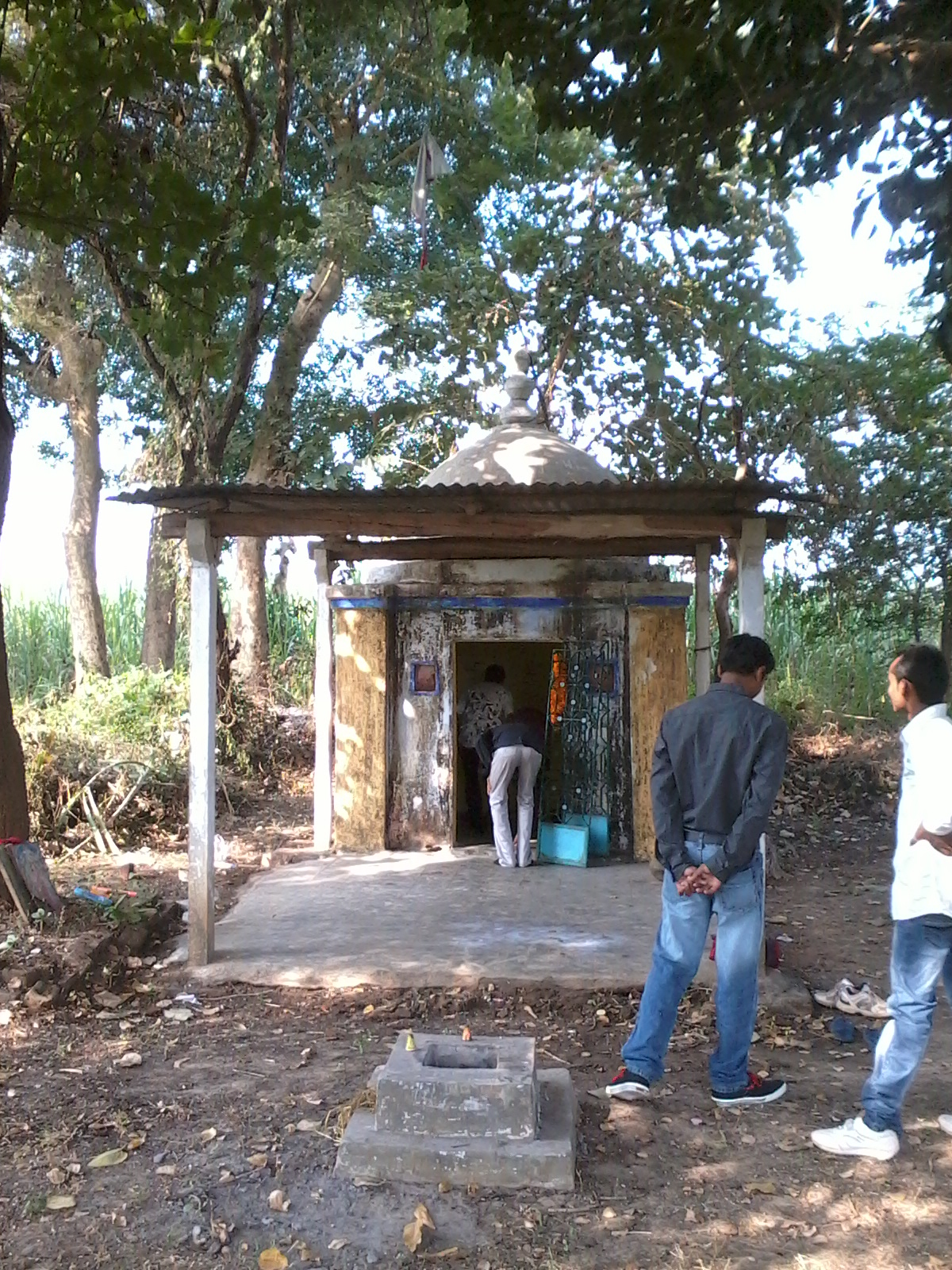
Bhoot Mama Temple

=== Bhoot Mama Mandir ===
Bhoot Mama Mandir is situated near the canal and can be seen from the main Vachhavad road.

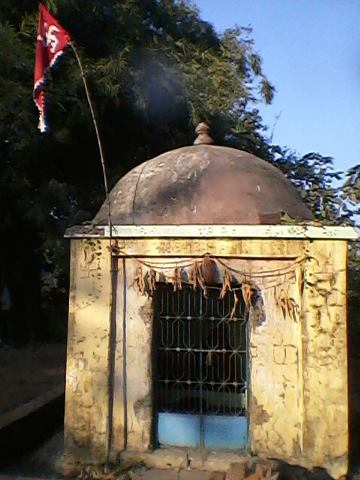
Hanuman Dada Mandir (Navu Faliyu)

=== Hanuman Dada Mandir (Navu Faliyu) ===
Hanuman Dada Mandir is situated in Nava Faliya.

=== Hanuman Dada Mandir (NaykiVaad) ===
Hanuman Dada Mandir is situated in Nayki Faliya.

== Vachhavad School ==
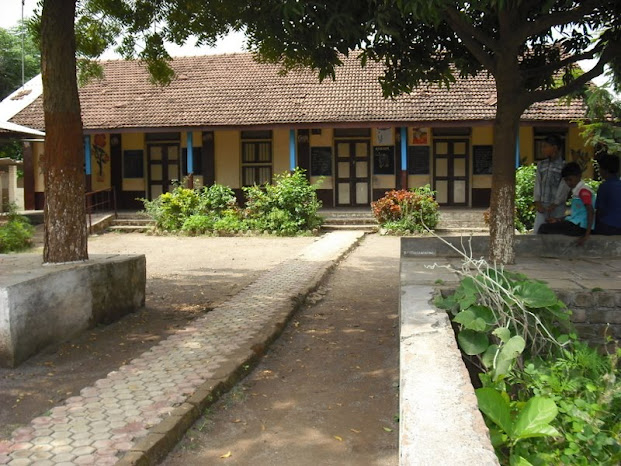
Vachhavad old building

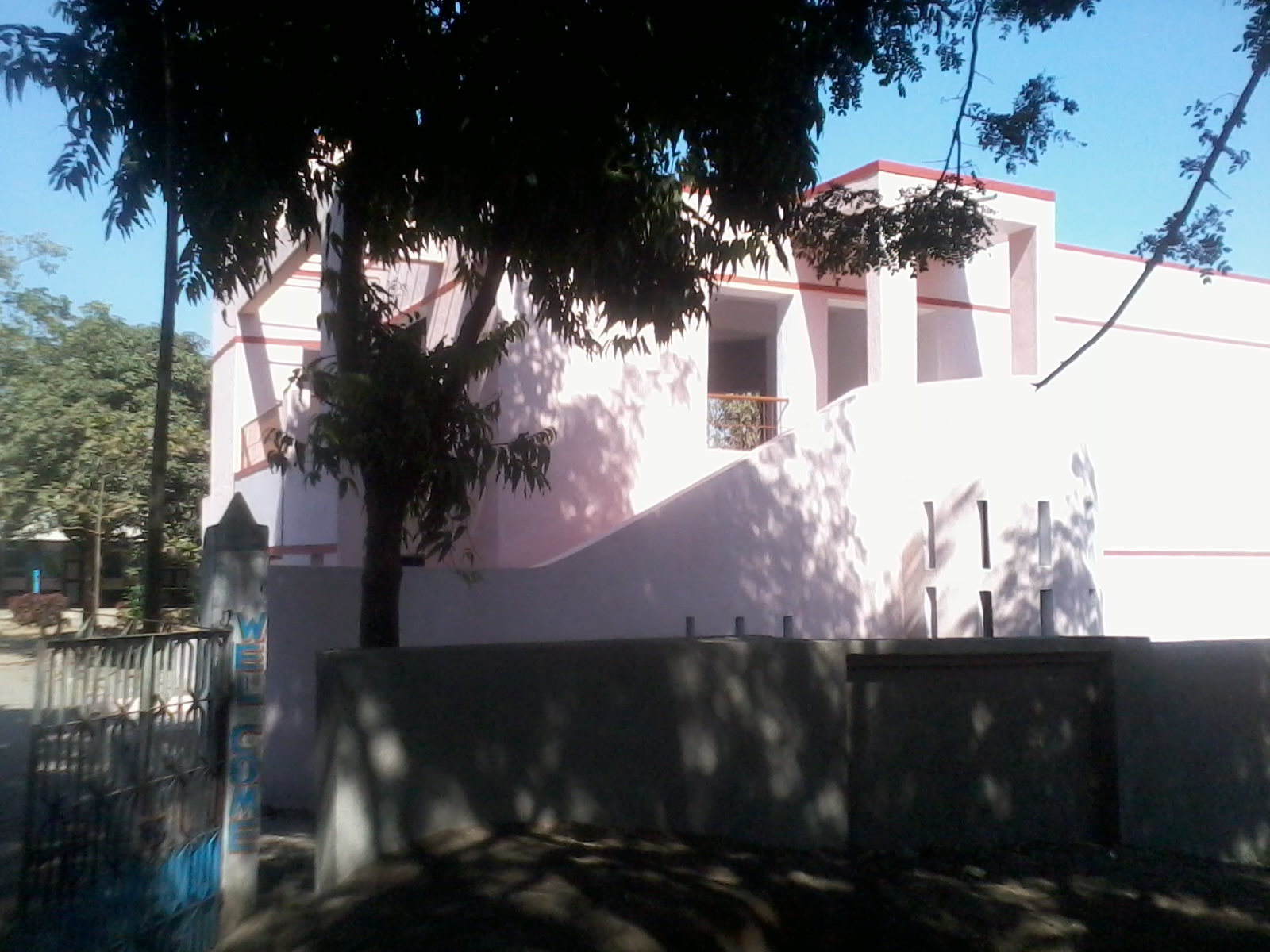
Vachhavad new building

Vachhavad School is a government school. The school operates six days a week. Monday to Friday are full days and the school is open a half day on Saturday. The school has standards 1 to 7, but is being developed for standards 8 and 9 with new infrastructure and classrooms.

== Sports ==
Vachhavad men play cricket and they have their own cricket teams for plastic and season ball.

== Festival ==
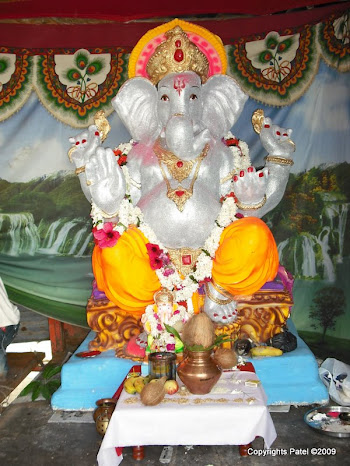
Ganesh puja 2009

In Vachhavad people enjoy festivals such as kite flying, holi, dhuldeti, diwali, new year, vagh baras and Ganesh puja Festival etc.

=== Holi ===
Holi Festival is celebrated in Vachhavad. Celebration starts the previous day when contributions are collected from all people – 5/10 Rs Per home for the Puja expenses. After collection all the money from the people is used to buy all the coconuts, sindur, and dhup for puja. Bhagat will come and clean an area near holi place and make temporary Temple for the God. God is not photes but it is a Stone. First the stone is washed and the temple cleaned with Cow-dung (Chhaan). The stone and piece of Sawar Stick are placed inside. After Bhagat incense sticks are lit,(Diva) the people pray for Villages happiness, Peace and prosperity. and this time the people prepare the holi. There are two holi in the nearby temple one is big and one small. Holi are made of pieces of date wood (Khajuri), Dried Dung (Chhana), and Karsata. After bhagat prayer bhagat fire sticks are given to two selected people, one is single and one is married. Both people take fire stick and round both holi 7 times set fire to it. and after the fire all the people shout once and give intimation to near village people that we set to fire the holi. Then after the fire decrease then people begin encircline the Holi 7 time around. People put rice, dates, and sugar in burning holi. After 7 rounds are completed people take INOCULATION (Tika) on head by ash (Rakh) and eat/take Sacrament (Prasad) and go home safely.

Next morning on Dhuleti women comes and pray for their family and take 7 rounds with dropping cup water and broke the coconut and make Sacrament (Prasad) and distribute in her home.

After this children and youngsters color each other and celebrate the holiday.

Kids stop people who going from near Holi Road using bicycle and vehicles stop people and Demand for the Holi collection of money (Holi no Faglo) for whole day and distribute the people among the team or make food or keep for future expenses.

=== Diwali and new year ===
Diwali is main festival of Vachhavad.

Agiyaras: this is first day of holi. On agiyaras people start earthen lamps in house on every door both corner and near tulsi tree and make Rangoli on front of home and collect contribution for Vagh bars Celebration. For each homr about 100 rs and buy the grocery for the Dal and Bhakhara.

Baras: On Day of Vagh baras morning Bhagat clean place for puja and put stone as God (Dev) and pray for villages happiness, Pease and prosperity. and then two kid selected for two characters for Vagh and Faludi. Make symbols on both of bodies and also colour cattle horn and make, hand sign by Removable colour (Geru) and stand Vagh and faludi between round cattle circle and then have to take fruit and coconut and run and that time village people have to stop them by throwing fruit name Chevata. This is funny game.

In the evening people get together and cut the vegetables and make Dal and Bhakhara. In Dal make easy because it contain Pumpkin (Kodhu), Mix Dal, Oil etc. In Bhakhara is difficult because its make by mix flour and mix with water and oil and make small bread (Bhakhara) and cover both side with leaves of tree and burn put into coal which is prepared by hard wood and roast it and remove leaves.

After make Dal and Bhakahara All people is invited for dinner and all village people will sit together and distribute one by one Dal, Bhakahra and salad.

Teras: On Day of teras people pray for lakhshmi mata, home will make clean and pray lakshmi mata to come home. Traders will start new account books from that day.

Chaudas: This day of myths and sacrifices this day. This day bhagat pray for kaali mata.

Diwali: This day kids fire crackers and celebrate end of the year.

New year: This Day girls make Rangoli on front of home All People Wear new cloths and go every home and say Happy new year and distribute sweets and kids take bless from elders. and elder give bless for good life and future. This day most of cricket ground open so afternoon youngster go for play cricket.

== Gallery ==
Vachhavad Gallery

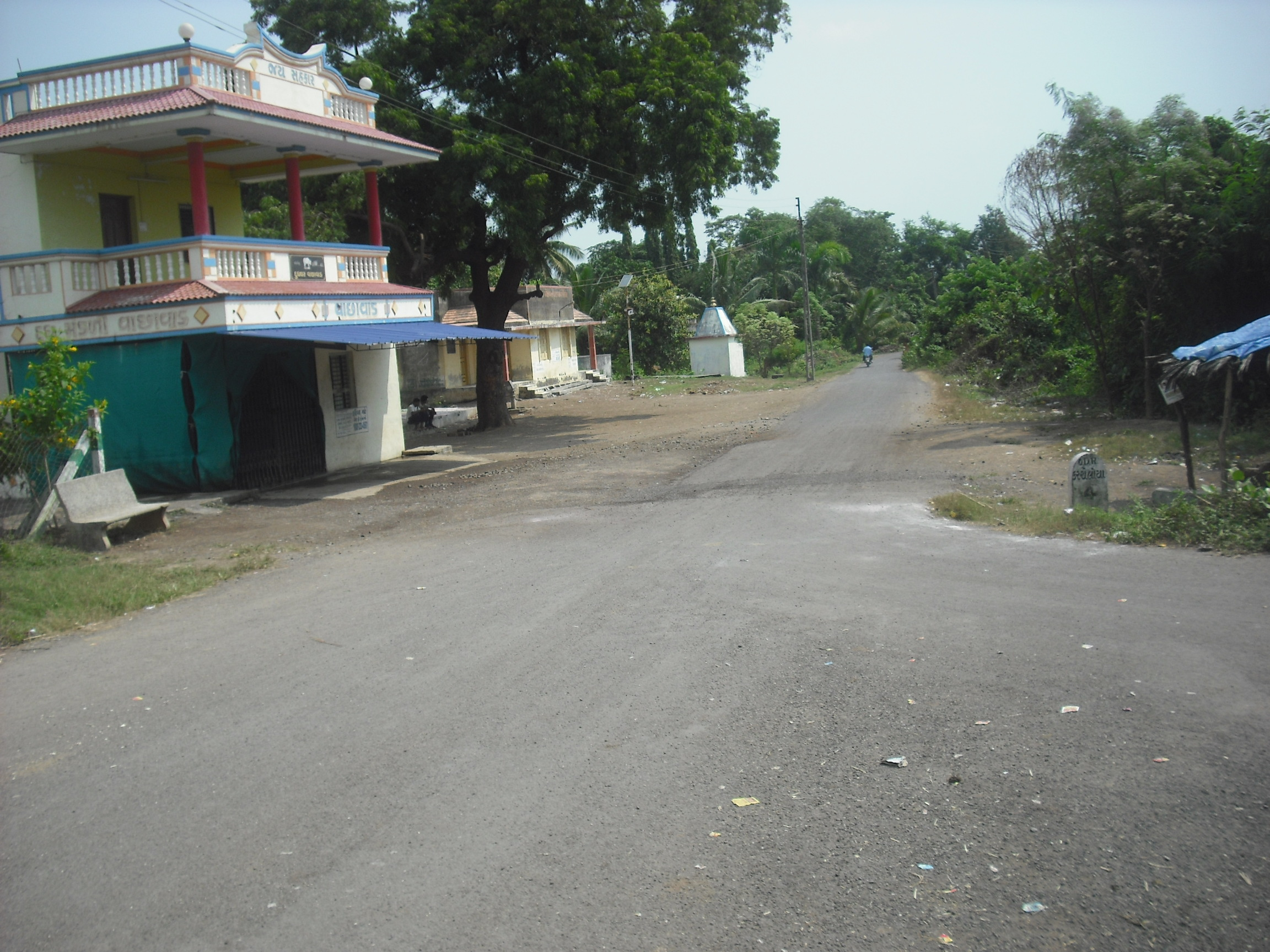
Vachhavad Road View From Vadko

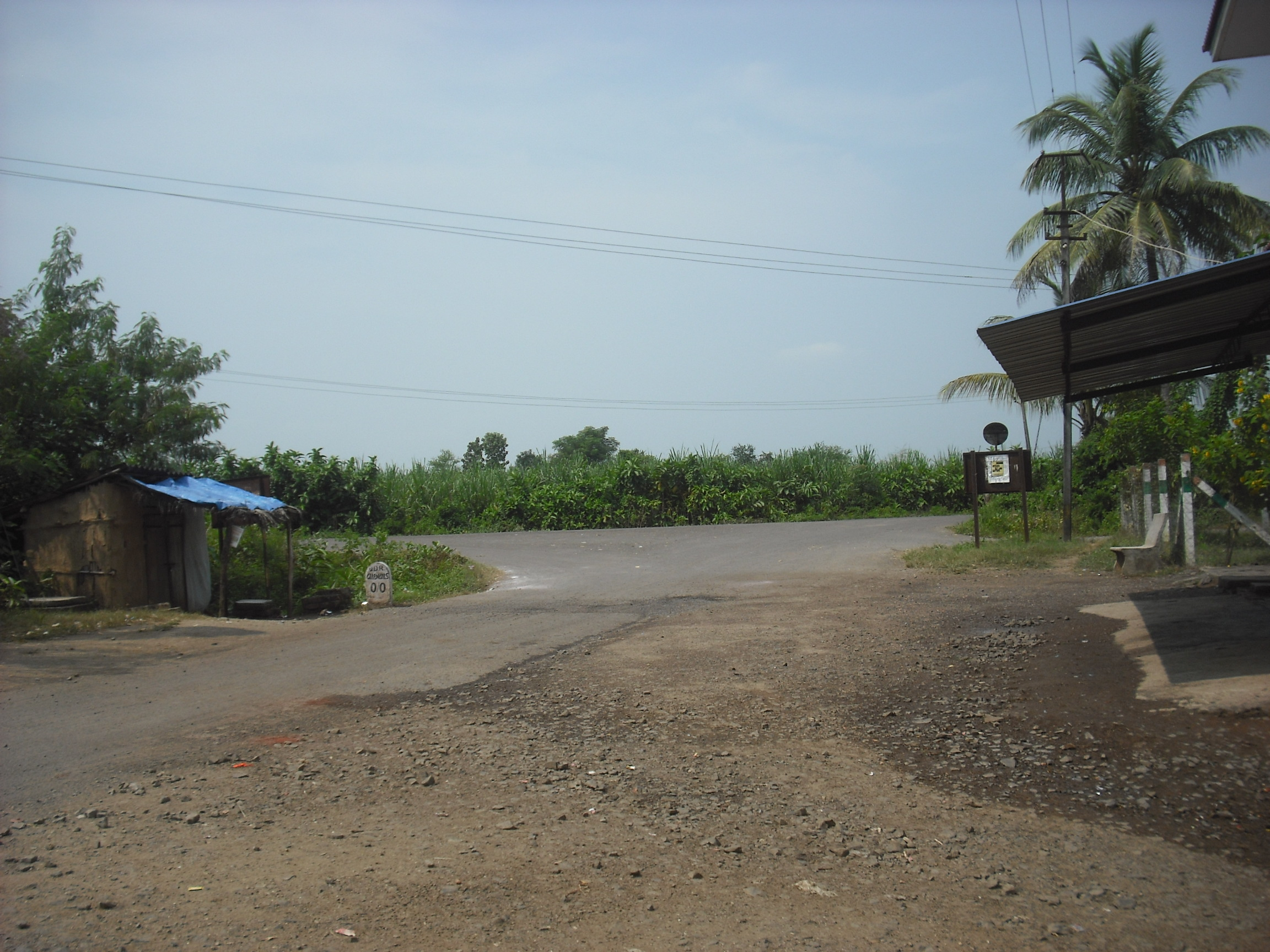
Vachhavad Road View From Hall

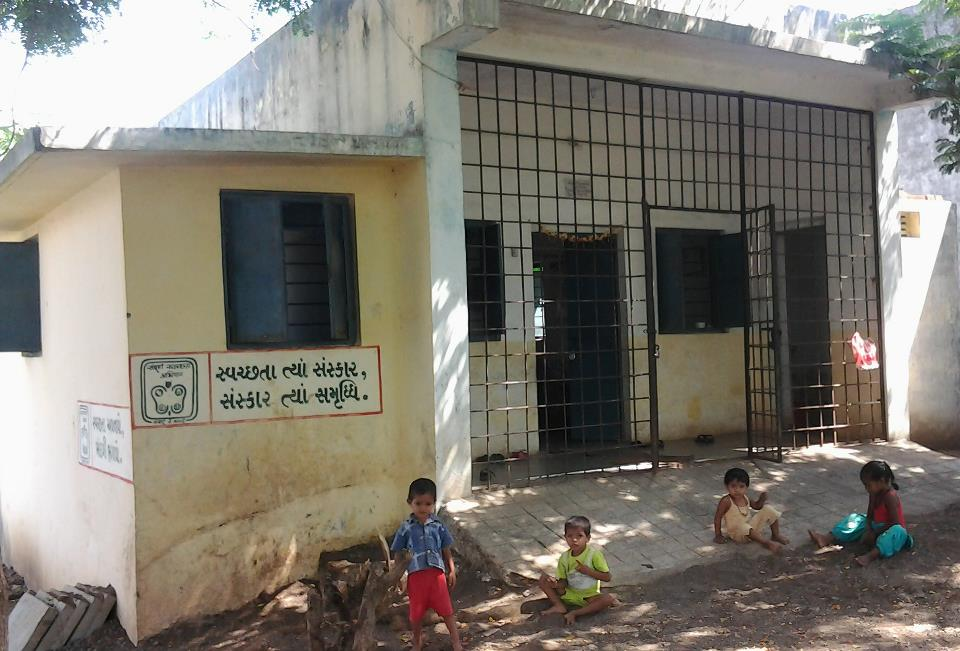
Vachhavad Bal Mandir

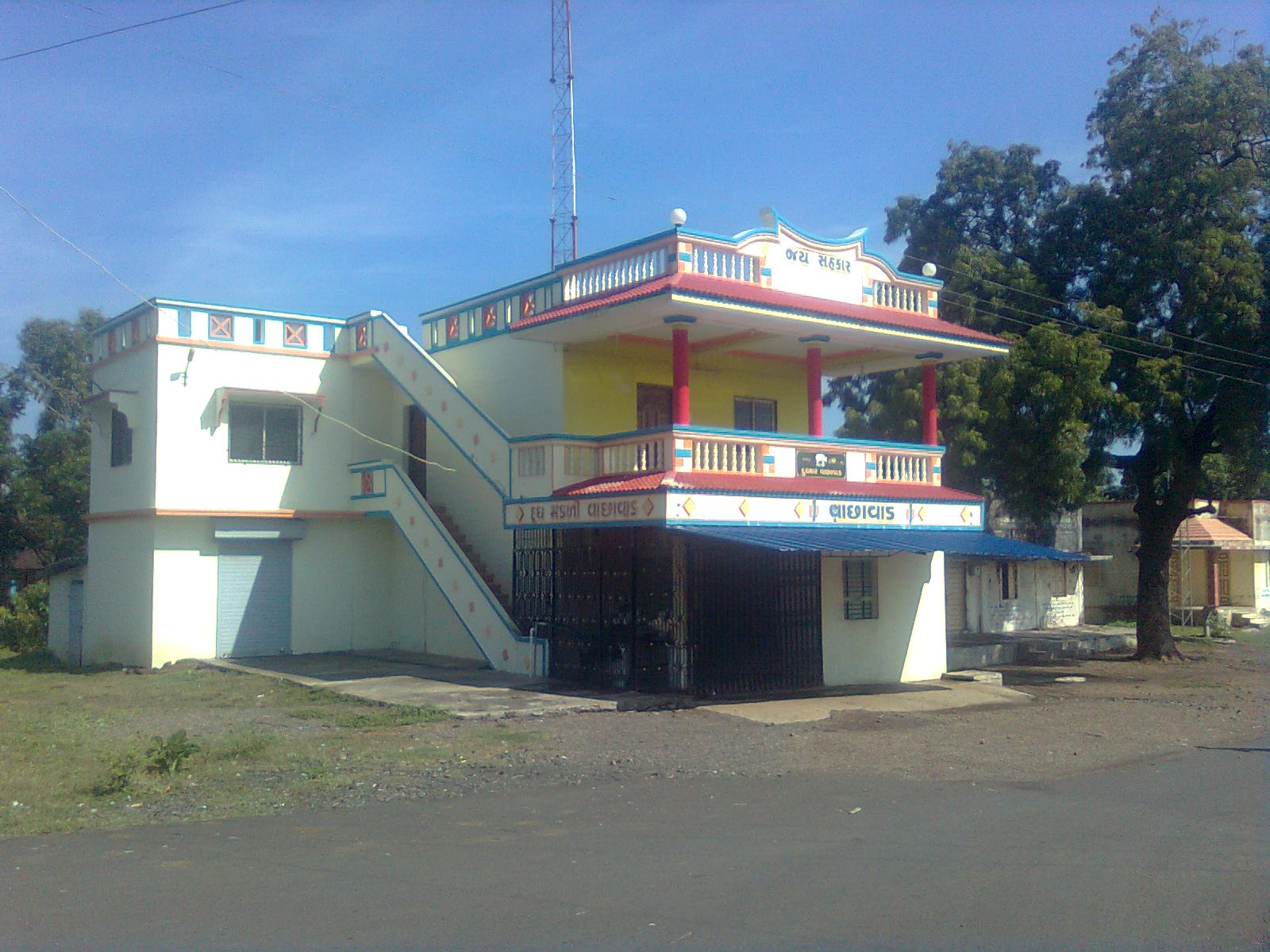
Vachhavad Dudh Mandali

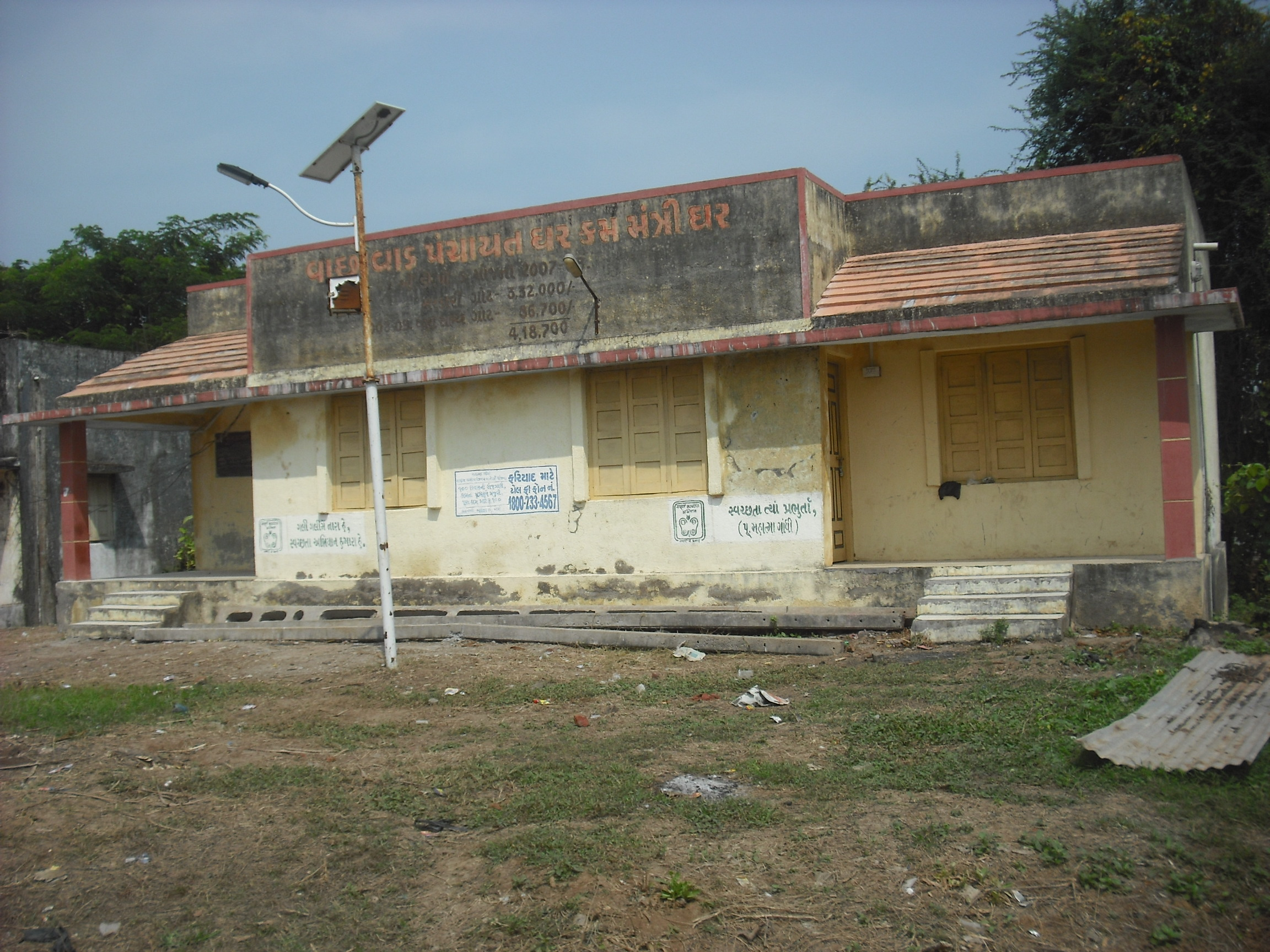
Vachhavad Mantri & Panchayat Gahar

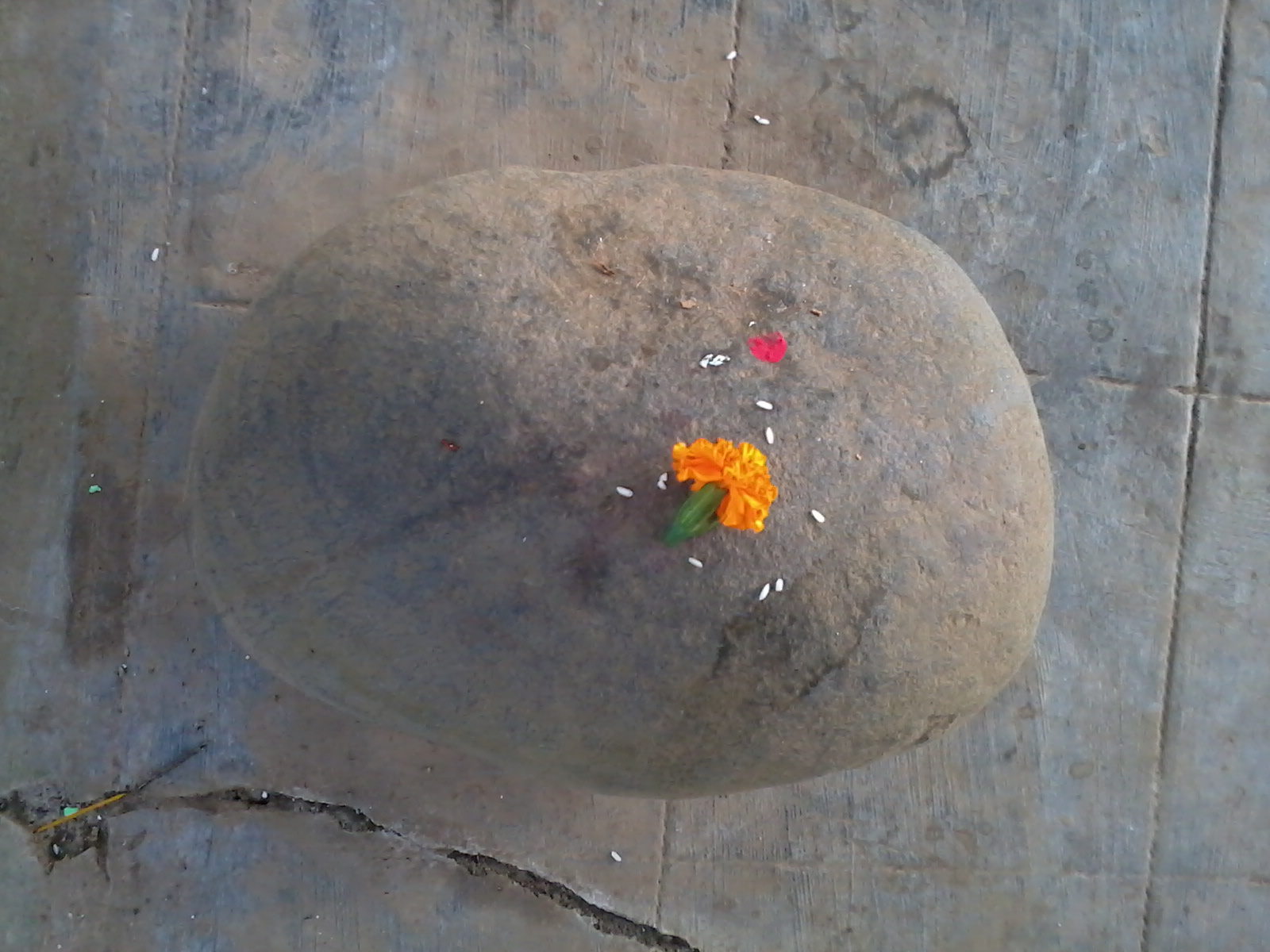
Vachhavad Bhoot Mama Mandir Stone

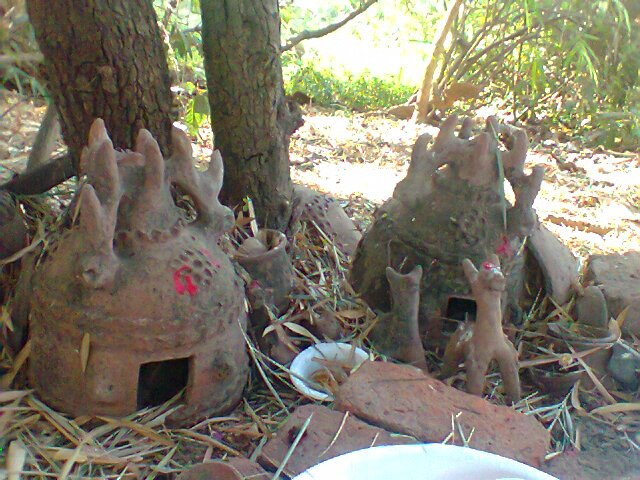
Vachhavad Bhoot Mama Mandir Dera

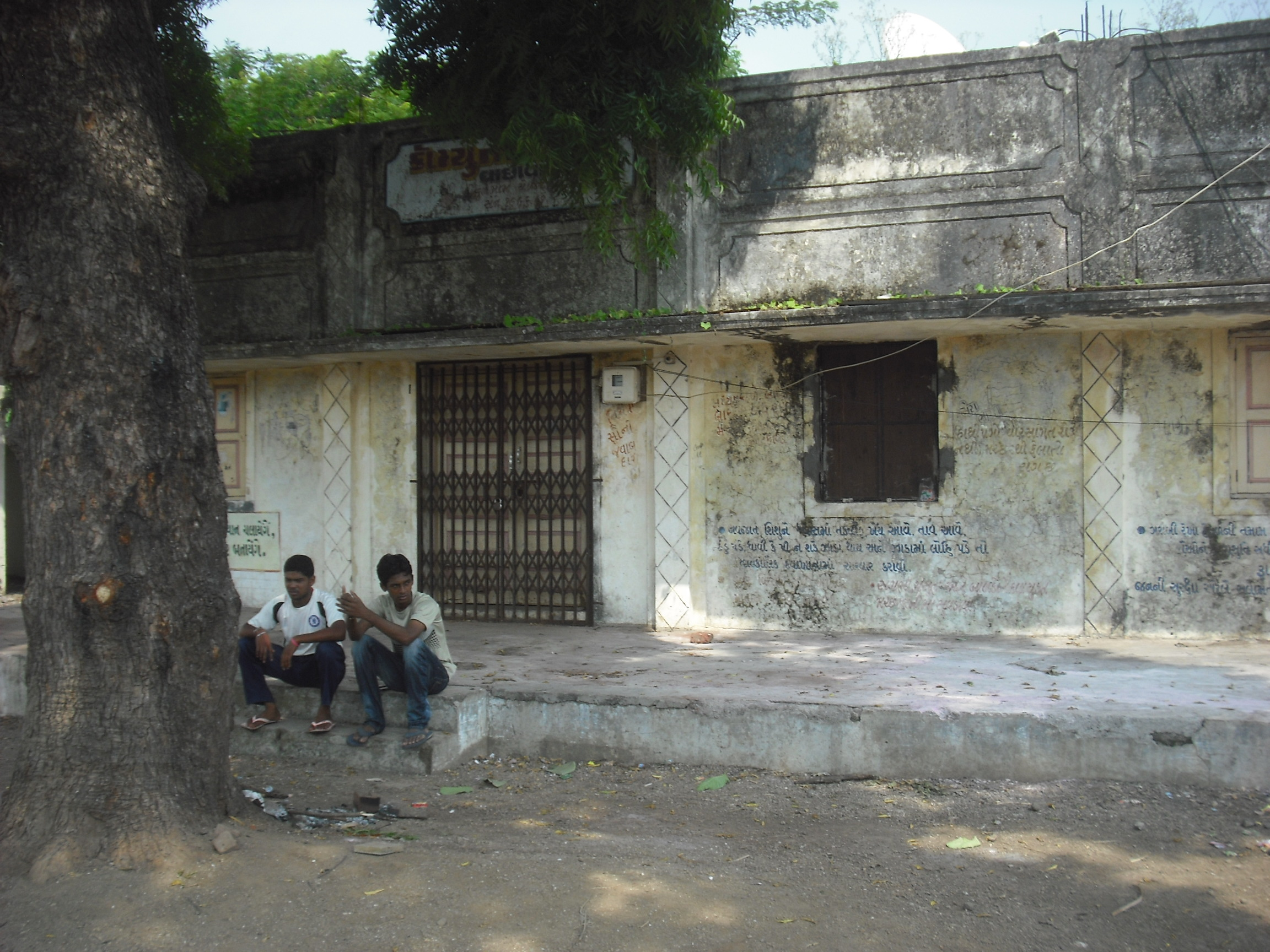
Vachhavad Community Hall

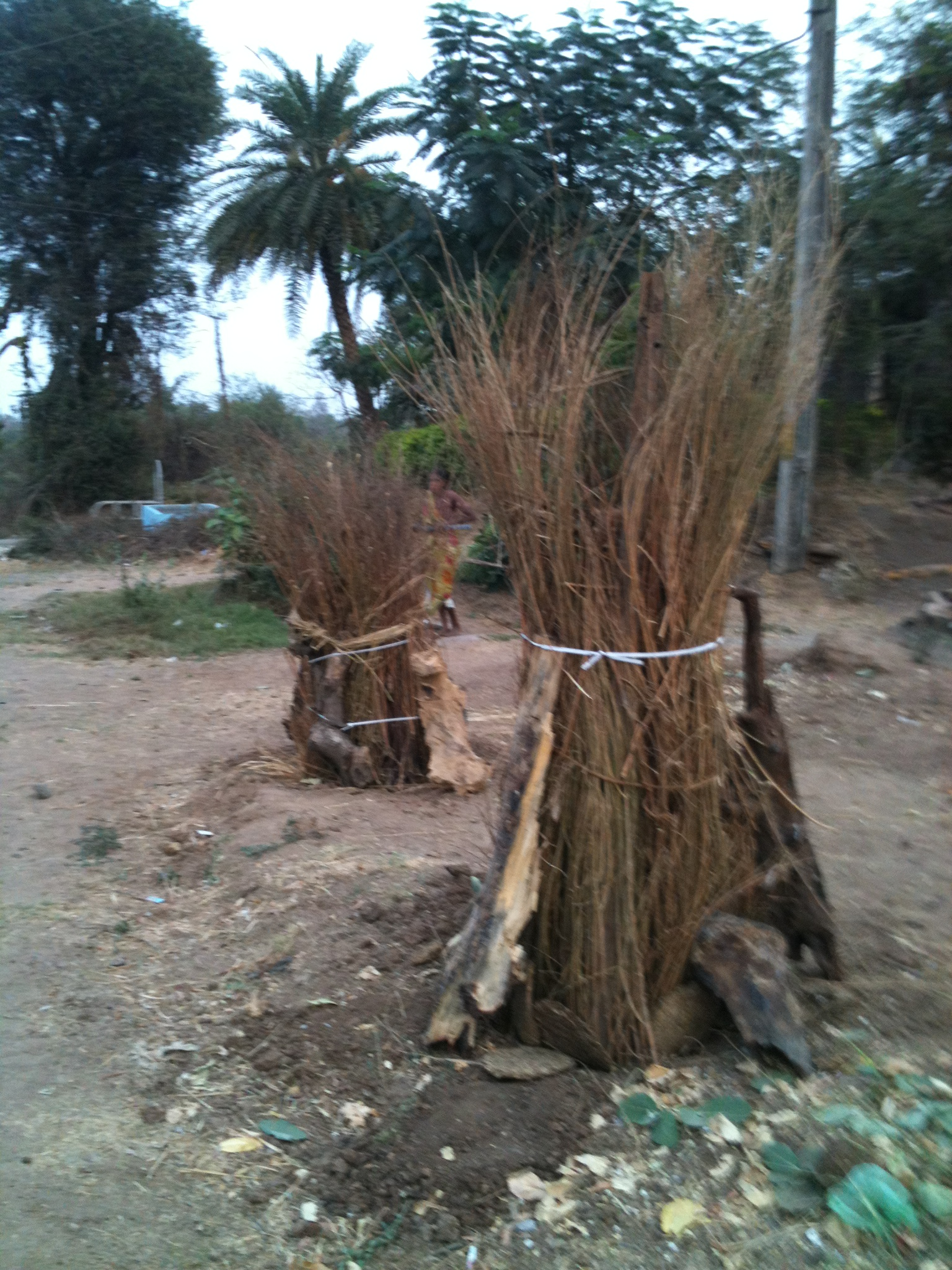
Vachhavad Holi Preparation 2013

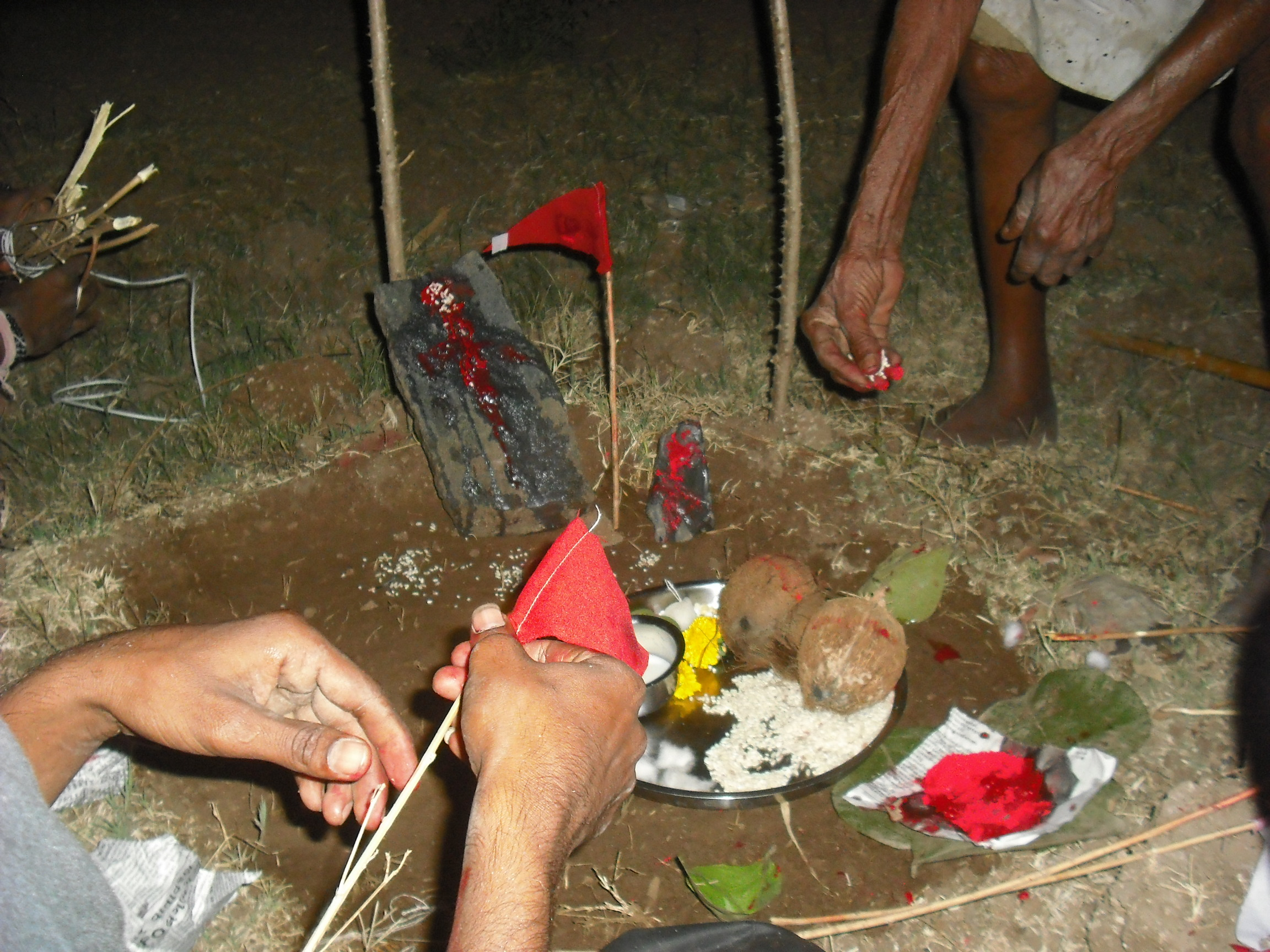
Vachhavad Holi Puja 2013

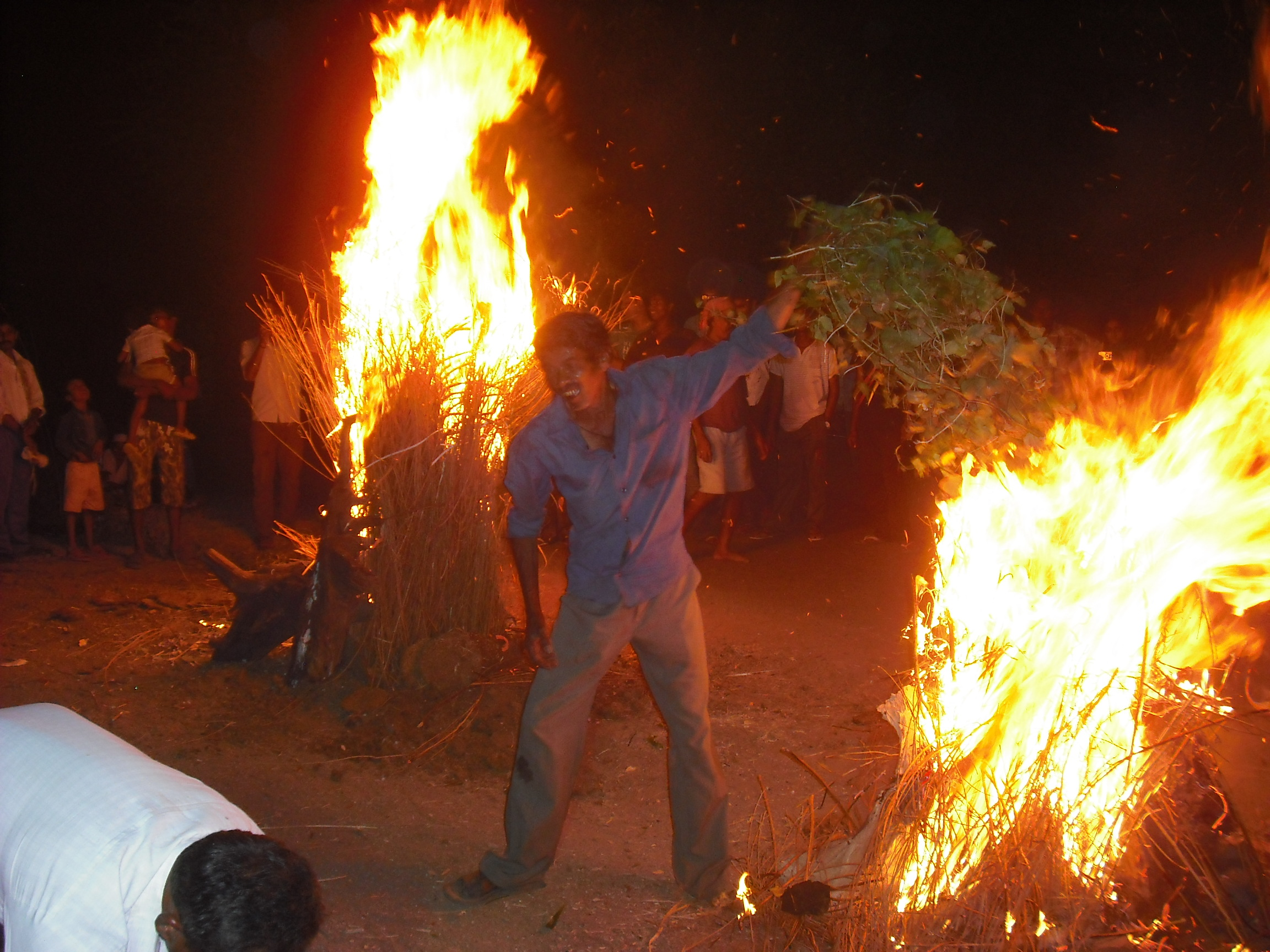
Vachhavad Holi Ablaze 2013

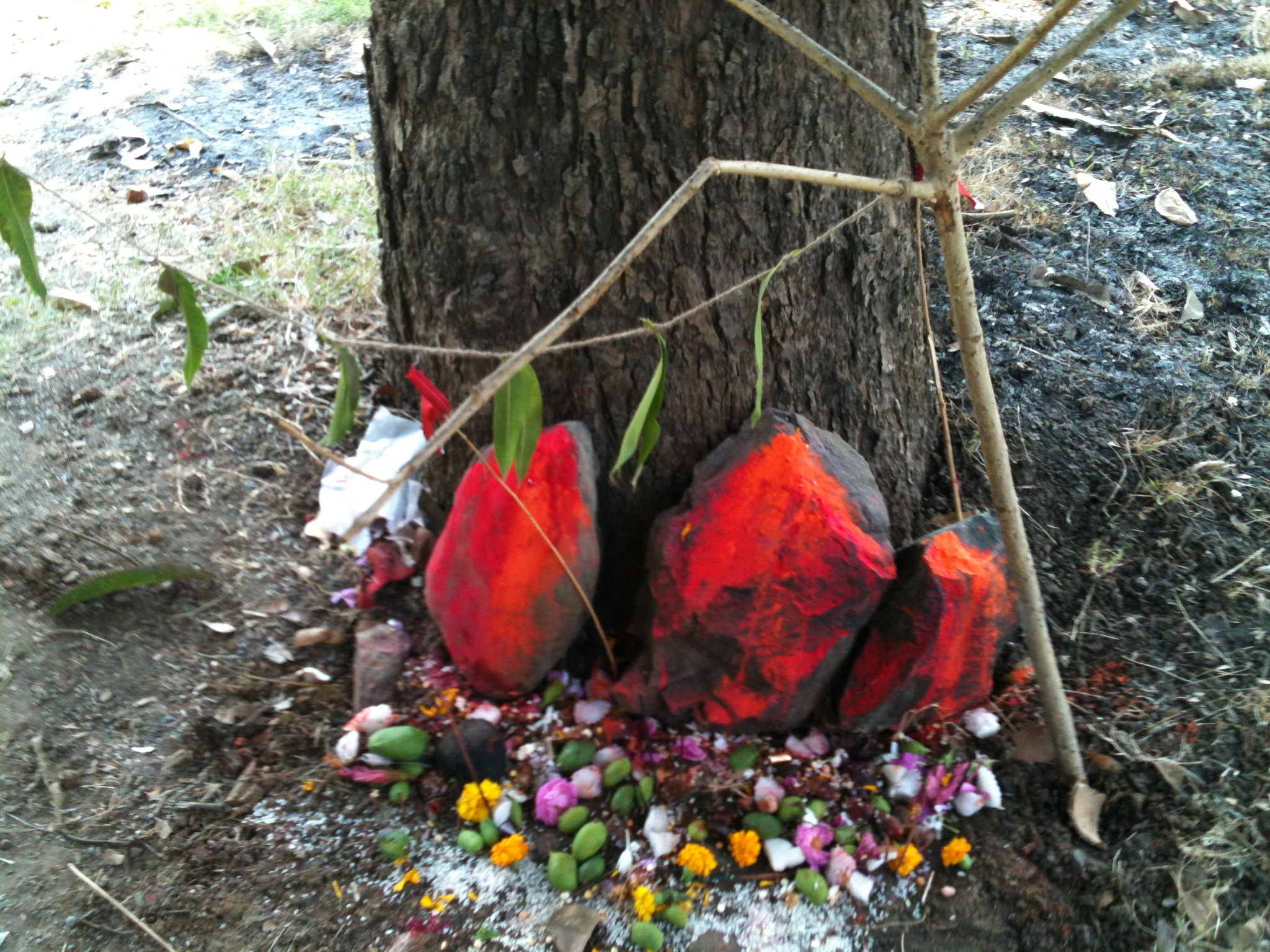
Vachhavad Duleti 2013

== See also ==
- List of tourist attractions in Surat
