= Ichchhapor =

- Town
- Location in Gujarat, India Ichchhapor (India)
- Coordinates: 21.19252°N 72.73836°E
- Country: India
- State: Gujarat
- District: Surat

Population (2001)
  - Total: 8,291

Languages
  - Official: Gujarati, Hindi
- Time zone: UTC+5:30 (IST)
- Vehicle registration: GJ
- Website: gujaratindia.com

Ichchhapor is a town in Surat district in the Indian state of Gujarat. The town comes under Hazira Urban Agglomerations.

== Demographics ==
As of 2001 India census, Ichchhapor had a population of 8291. Males constitute 56% of the population and females 44%. Ichchhapor has an average literacy rate of 79%, higher than the national average of 59.5%: male literacy is 83%, and female literacy is 75%. In Ichchhapor, 13% of the population is under 6 years of age.

== See also ==
- List of tourist attractions in Surat
