= Simalthu =

- Village
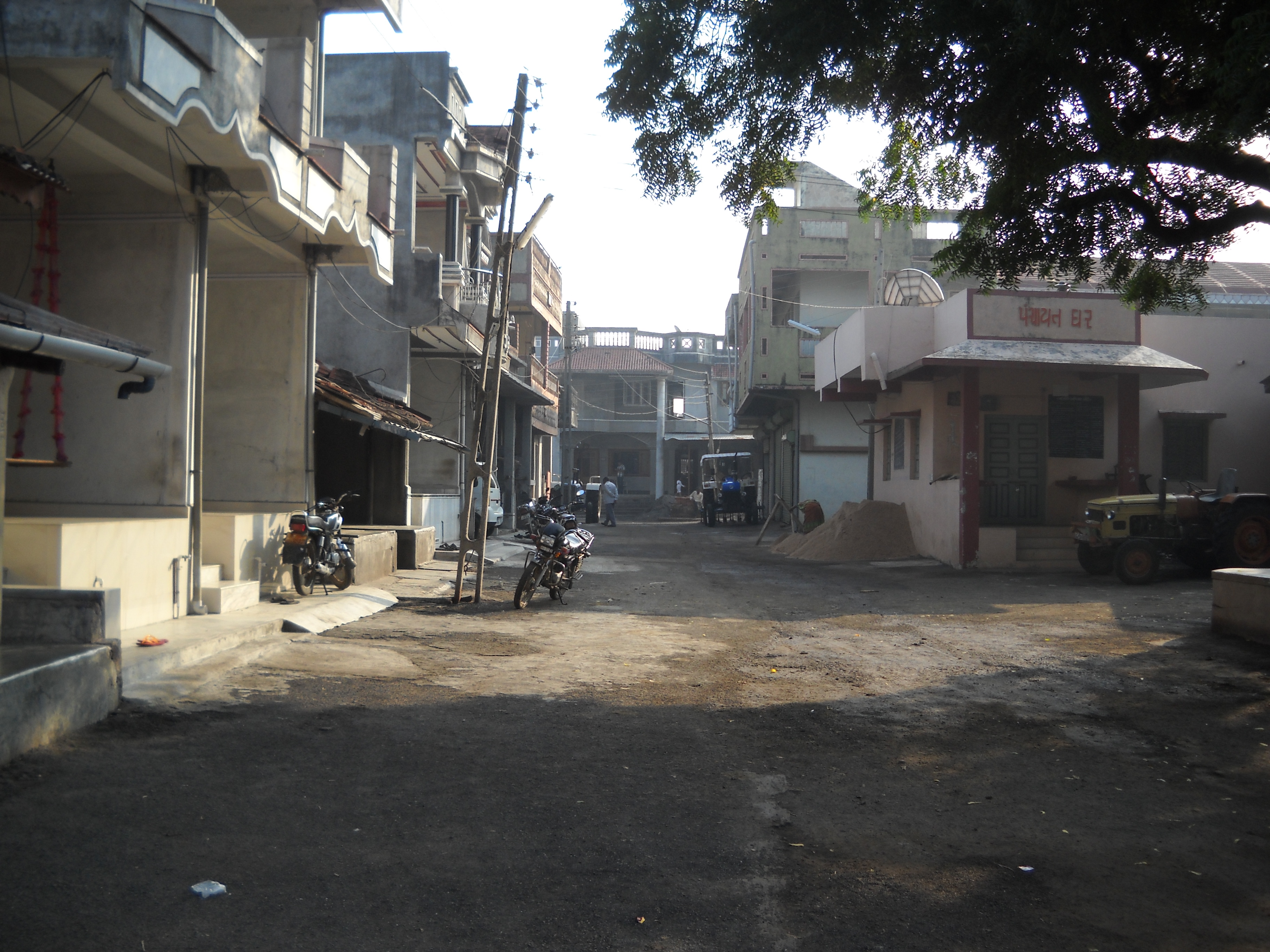
- Nickname: Sugar Village / Rice Village
- Location in Gujarat, India Simalthu (India)
- Coordinates: 21.3918°N 72.8694°E
- Country: India
- State: Gujarat
- District: Surat

Area
  - Total: 50.51 km^{2} (19.50 sq mi)
- Elevation: 15 m (49 ft)

Population (2010)
  - Total: 800
  - Density: 16/km^{2} (41/sq mi)

Languages
  - Official: Gujarati, Hindi, English
- Time zone: UTC+5:30 (IST)
- PIN: 394110
- Telephone code: 91(02621)
- Vehicle registration: GJ 05 (Surat)
- Coastline: 65 kilometres (40 mi)
- Website: gujaratindia.com

Simalthu is a village in the Surat district of Gujarat, India. It is 20 kilometres (12 mi) north of Surat and is known for its involvement with cultivation of sugar and rice, and for its small businesses such as workshops and small shops. Simalthu is a village in the Surat district of Gujarat, India. It is 20 kilometres (12 mi) north of Surat and is known for its involvement with cultivation of sugar and rice, and for its small business such as workshops and small shops.
