= Udhana taluka =

Udhana Taluka Udhna Taluka
- taluka
- Country: India
- State: Gujarat
- District: Surat

Population (2001)
  - Total: 480,456

Languages
  - Official: Gujarati, Hindi
- Time zone: UTC+5:30 (IST)
- Vehicle registration: GJ 05
- Website: gujaratindia.com

Udhana Taluka, formed in 1992 from part of Choryasi Taluka, is a taluka located in the Surat District in the Indian State of Gujarat. In 2001, its population was 480,456. Udhana Taluka is part of the Surat Metropolitan Region.

== Geography ==
According to the Jilla Panchayat Surat, the Taluka has 30 square miles (78 km^{2}).

=== Major highways ===
State Highway 6, Gujarat (Old Surat Mumbai Highway) State Highway 66, Gujarat (Udhana-Magdalla Highway) State Highway 168, Gujarat (Sachin-Palsana Highway)

=== Adjacent Talukas ===
- Choryasi Taluka (South west)
- Jalalpore Taluka (South)
- Palsana Taluka (southeast)
- Surat city (north)

== Demographics ==
As of the 2001 census, 4,80,445 people resided in the county, of which 64% were males and 36% were females. Most of the population is from other states such as Uttar Pradesh, Maharashtra, Madhya Pradesh, Rajasthan, etc.

== Communities ==
=== Cities ===
- Udhana
- Sachin, Gujarat
