= Limla =

- city
- Location in Gujarat, India Limla (India)
- Coordinates: 21.17367°N 72.70794°E
- Country: India
- State: Gujarat
- District: Surat

Population (2001)
  - Total: 6,622

Languages
  - Official: Gujarati, Hindi
- Time zone: UTC+5:30 (IST)
- Vehicle registration: GJ
- Website: gujaratindia.com

Limla is a census town in Surat district in the Indian state of Gujarat.

== Demographics ==
As of 2001 India census, Limla had a population of 6622. Males constitute 56% of the population and females 44%. Limla has an average literacy rate of 75%, higher than the national average of 59.5%: male literacy is 79%, and female literacy is 70%. In Limla, 11% of the population is under 6 years of age.

== See also ==
- List of tourist attractions in Surat
