= Kadod =

- town
- Location in Gujarat, India
- Coordinates: 21.218°N 73.22°E
- Country: India
- State: Gujarat
- District: Surat

Population
  - Total: 16,747

Languages
  - Official: Gujarati, Hindi
- Time zone: UTC+5:30 (IST)
- PIN: 394335

Kadod is a town located in the Bardoli Tehsil of Surat District, Gujarat state, India and situated on the bank of the Tapti River. It is around 15 kilometres (9 mi) north east of Bardoli.

There is many temples dedicated to Lord Hanuman and Lord Rama. Shree Rokadia Hanuman Mandir, Shree Mankameshwar Mahadev Temple, Shree Dantai Mataji Mandir, Shree Hingalaji Mataji Mandir and Shree Atmananda Saraswathiji Maharaj Temple are some of the shrines located here. In Kadod there is "Sarvajanik Pustakalay(Library)" also. For night cricket tournament, a good cricket ground named "Gandhi Ground" is helpful to mostly youngsters.

Kadod and Kadod High School have received national media attention due to the innovative pilot program of the Nanubhai Education Foundation, a charity focused on improving rural education in India.

== See also ==
- List of tourist attractions in Surat
