= Sandip Desai =

Indian politician

Sandip Desai (born 1972) is an Indian politician from Gujarat. He is a member of the Gujarat Legislative Assembly from Choryasi Assembly constituency in Surat district. He won the 2022 Gujarat Legislative Assembly election representing the Bharatiya Janata Party.

== Early life and education ==
Desai is from Choryasi, Surat district, Gujarat. He is the son of Jayantilal Daultray Desai. He studied Bachelor of Arts first year at M. T. B. Arts College, Athawalines, Surat in 1992 and later discontinued his studies.

== Career ==
Desai won from Choryasi Assembly constituency representing the Bharatiya Janata Party in the 2022 Gujarat Legislative Assembly election. He polled 236,033 votes and defeated his nearest rival, Prakashbhai Contractor of the Aam Aadmi Party, by a margin of 186,418 votes. He is a first timer, but his margin of victory is only second to the chief minister candidate, Bhupendra Patel.
