= Sangita Patil =

Indian politician

Sangitaben Rajendra Patil (born 1976) is an Indian politician from Gujarat. She is a three time member of the Gujarat Legislative Assembly, representing the Bharatiya Janata Party from the Limbayat Assembly constituency in Surat district. She was elected in 2012, 2017 and 2022.

== Early life and education ==
Patil is from Limbayat, Surat district, Gujarat. She married Patil Rajendra Kumar Baburao, a businessman. She completed her B.A. at Yashwantrao Chavan Maharashtra Open University, Nashik in 2018.

== Career ==
Patil won as an MLA for the first time in the 2012 Gujarat Legislative Assembly election from Limbayat Assembly constituency representing the Bharatiya Janata Party. She defeated Suresh Sonavale of the Indian National Congress by a margin of 30,321 votes. She retained the seat for the BJP in the 2017 Gujarat Legislative Assembly election. She became an MLA for the third time winning the 2022 Gujarat Legislative Assembly election. She polled 95,696 votes and defeated her nearest rival, Pankaj Tayade of the Aam Aadmi Party, by a margin of 58,009 votes.

Patil sought the imposition of 'Disturbed Areas Act' in her constituency which prevents the selling of property of one community member to another community member without prior permission of a collector. She has been accused of using a dummy candidate for her third year BA exam by a local Shiv Sena leader; she refuted the claim and filed a defamation case.
