= Manu Patel =

Indian politician

Manubhai Patel (born 1962) is an Indian politician from Gujarat. He is a member of the Gujarat Legislative Assembly from Udhna Assembly constituency in Surat district. He won the 2022 Gujarat Legislative Assembly election representing the Bharatiya Janata Party.

== Early life and education ==
Patel is from Udhna, Surat district, Gujarat. He is the son of Mohanbhai Kemchand Das Patel. He studied Class 8 at Shree NV Patel High School, Malikpur, Vadnagar taluka, Mehsana district and later discontinued his studies. He is into construction works as a contractor.

== Career ==
Patel won from Udhna Assembly constituency representing the Bharatiya Janata Party in the 2022 Gujarat Legislative Assembly election. He polled 93,999 votes and defeated his nearest rival, Dansukh Rajput of the Indian National Congress, by a margin of 69,896 votes.
