= Karanj Assembly constituency =

Legislative Assembly constituency in Gujarat State, India

Coordinates: 21.37°N 73.01°E

Karanj
- Constituency No. 162 for the Gujarat Legislative Assembly

Constituency details
- Country: India
- Region: Western India
- State: Gujarat
- District: Surat
- Lok Sabha constituency: Surat
- Established: 2008
- Total electors: 176,589
- Reservation: None

Member of Legislative Assembly
- 15th Gujarat Legislative Assembly
- Incumbent Pravinbhai Manjibhai Ghoghari
- Party: Bharatiya Janata Party
- Elected year: 2022

Karanj is one of the 182 Legislative Assembly constituencies of Gujarat state in India. It is part of Surat district and came into existence after 2008 delimitation.

== List of segments ==
This assembly seat represents the following segments,

1. Surat City Taluka (Part) – Surat Municipal Corporation (Part) Ward No. – 36, 46, 47, 48.

== Members of Legislative Assembly ==
Year	Member	Picture	Party
2012	Janakbhai Kachhadiya		Bharatiya Janata Party
2017	Pravinbhai Manjibhai Ghoghari		Bharatiya Janata Party
2022	Pravinbhai Manjibhai Ghoghari		Bharatiya Janata Party

== Election results ==
=== 2022 ===
Gujarat Assembly election, 2022:Karanj Assembly constituency
Party	Candidate	Votes	%	±%
BJP	Pravin Ghoghari	60493	67.67	
AAP	Ahir Manoj Sorathiya	24519	27.43	
INC	Bharti Prakashbhai Patel	2954	3.3	
RRP	Ladumor Maheshbhai Kababhai	218	0.24	N/A
NOTA	None of the above	756	0.85	
Majority			40.24	
Turnout				
Registered electors		175,809		
BJP hold		Swing		

=== 2017 ===
Gujarat Legislative Assembly Election, 2017: Karanj
Party	Candidate	Votes	%	±%
BJP	Pravin Ghoghari			
NOTA	None of the Above			
Majority				
Turnout				

=== 2012 ===
Gujarat Assembly Election, 2012
Party	Candidate	Votes	%	±%
BJP	Janakbhai Kachhadiya	65696	55.52	
INC	Jaysukhbhai Zalavadiya	16257	17.44	
Majority		49439	53.05	
Turnout		93192	64.64	
BJP win (new seat)				

== See also ==
- List of constituencies of Gujarat Legislative Assembly
- Gujarat Legislative Assembly
