= Ishwarbhai Parmar =

Indian politician

Minister of Social Justice and Empowerment, Government of Gujarat
- In office 26 December 2017 – September 2021
- Preceded by: Atmaram Parmar
- Succeeded by: Pradip Parmar

Member of the Gujarat Legislative Assembly
- Incumbent
- Assumed office 2017
- Constituency: Bardoli

Personal details
- Born: 1 March 1971 (age 55) Bardoli, Surat district
- Party: Bharatiya Janata Party

Ishwarbhai Ramanbhai Parmar (born 1971) is an Indian politician from Gujarat. He is a member of the Gujarat Legislative Assembly. He won the 2022 Gujarat Legislative Assembly election representing the Bharatiya Janata Party from Bardoli Assembly constituency, which is reserved for Scheduled Caste community, in Surat district.

== Early life and education ==
Parmar is from Bardoli, Surat district, Gujarat. He is the son of Ramanbhai Sukhabhai Parmar. He studied Class 12 at MB Vamdot Sarvajanik High School, Bardoli in 1990 but failed badly to clear the examinations.

== Career ==
Parmar won from Bardoli Assembly constituency representing the Bharatiya Janata Party in the 2022 Gujarat Legislative Assembly election. He polled 118,527 votes and defeated his nearest rival, Pannaben Patel of the Indian National Congress, by a margin of 89,948 votes. He first became an MLA winning the 2012 Gujarat Legislative Assembly election representing the BJP from Bardoli. He retained the seat in the 2017 Gujarat Legislative Assembly election. He won for a third straight time in the 2022 Assembly election.
