= Varachha Road Assembly constituency =

Legislative Assembly constituency in Gujarat State, India

Coordinates: 20.99°N 73.17°E

Varachha Road
- Constituency No. 161 for the Gujarat Legislative Assembly

Constituency details
- Country: India
- Region: Western India
- State: Gujarat
- District: Surat
- Lok Sabha constituency: Surat
- Established: 2008
- Total electors: 215,926
- Reservation: None

Member of Legislative Assembly
- 15th Gujarat Legislative Assembly
- Incumbent Kishor Kanani
- Party: Bharatiya Janata Party
- Elected year: 2022

Varachha Road is one of the 182 Legislative Assembly constituencies of Gujarat state in India. It is part of Surat city and it came into existence after 2008 delimitation.

== List of segments ==
This assembly seat represents the following segments,

1. Surat City Taluka (Part) – Surat Municipal Corporation (Part) Ward No. – 28, 43, 44, 45.

== Member of Legislative Assembly ==
Year	Member	Picture	Party
2012	Kishor Kanani		Bharatiya Janata Party
2017	Kishor Kanani		Bharatiya Janata Party
2022	Kishor Kanani		Bharatiya Janata Party

== Election results ==
=== 2022 ===
Gujarat Legislative Assembly Election, 2022: Varachha Road
Party	Candidate	Votes	%	±%
BJP	Kishor Kanani	67,206	55.13	+0.44
INC	Praful Togadiya (Papanbhai)	2940	2.41	−41.1
AAP	Alpesh Kathiriya	50372	41.32	New
Majority			13.81	
Turnout		121908		
Registered electors		215,306		
BJP hold		Swing		

=== 2017 ===
Gujarat Legislative Assembly Election, 2017: Varachha Road
Party	Candidate	Votes	%	±%
BJP	Kishor Kanani	68,472	54.69	
INC	Dhirubhai Gajera	54,474	43.51	
Majority		13,998	11.18	
Turnout		1,25,191	63.03	
BJP hold		Swing		

=== 2012 ===
Gujarat Assembly Election, 2012
Party	Candidate	Votes	%	±%
BJP	Kishor Kanani	68,529	53.78	
INC	Dhirubhai Gajera	48,170	37.80	
Majority		20,359	15.98	
Turnout		127,420	68.70	
BJP hold		Swing		

== See also ==
- List of constituencies of Gujarat Legislative Assembly
- Gujarat Legislative Assembly
