= Surat North Assembly constituency =

Legislative Assembly constituency in Gujarat State, India

Coordinates: 21.23°N 72.81°E

Surat North
- Constituency No. 160 for the Gujarat Legislative Assembly

Constituency details
- Country: India
- Region: Western India
- State: Gujarat
- District: Surat
- Lok Sabha constituency: Surat
- Established: 1967
- Total electors: 163,190
- Reservation: None

Member of Legislative Assembly
- 15th Gujarat Legislative Assembly
- Incumbent Kantibhai Himmatbhai Balar
- Party: Bharatiya Janata Party
- Elected year: 2022

Surat North is one of the 182 Legislative Assembly constituencies of Gujarat state in India. It is part of Surat district.

== List of segments ==
This assembly seat represents the following segments,

1. Surat City Taluka (Part) – Surat Municipal Corporation (Part) Ward No. – 4, 6, 7, 29, 31, 32.

== Members of Legislative Assembly ==
- 2007 - Nanubhai Vanani, Bharatiya Janata Party
- 2012 - Ajaykumar Choksi, Bharatiya Janata Party

Year	Member	Picture	Party
2017	Kantibhai Balar		Bharatiya Janata Party
2022	Kantibhai Balar		Bharatiya Janata Party

== Election results ==
=== 2022 ===
Gujarat Assembly election, 2022: Surat North Assembly constituency
Party	Candidate	Votes	%	±%
BJP	Kanti Balar	57117	59.1	
AAP	Mahendra Navadiya	22824	23.62	
INC	Ashok Patel (Adhevada)	14854	15.37	
NOTA	None of the above	831	0.86	
Majority			35.48	
Turnout				
Registered electors		162,796		
BJP gain from		Swing		

=== 2017 ===
Gujarat Legislative Assembly Election, 2017: Surat North
Party	Candidate	Votes	%	±%
BJP	Kanti Balar			
NOTA	None of the Above			
Majority				
Turnout				

=== 2012 ===
Gujarat Assembly Election, 2012
Party	Candidate	Votes	%	±%
BJP	Ajaykumar Choksi	59690	67.77	
INC	Dineshbhai Kachhadiya	37656	33.23	
Majority		22034	21.32	
Turnout		103330	67.97	
BJP hold		Swing		

== See also ==
- List of constituencies of Gujarat Legislative Assembly
- Gujarat Legislative Assembly
