= Bhanodra =

Village in Gujarat state, India

Bhanodra is a village located in Choryasi Taluka of Surat district in Gujarat state of India. It is about 15km from the Arabian Sea coast and less than 4km from Surat City Municipal Boundary. Its nearest railhead is Bhestan, Surat City about 4km from the village. As of 2011, Bhandora has a population of 1138 people. Among the 1138 people, 16% are children, 30% are tribe members, 36% cannot read, and 39% are workers. Most of the families are engaged in agriculture. The village is often counted within the larger settlement of Eklera.
