= Pravin Ghoghari =

Indian politician

Pravin Ghoghari (born 5 April 1967) is an Indian politician from Gujarat. He is a member of the Gujarat Legislative Assembly from Karanj Assembly constituency in Surat district. He won the 2022 Gujarat Legislative Assembly election representing the Bharatiya Janata Party.

== Early life and education ==
Ghoghari is born in Pachhegam, Surat district, Gujarat. He is the son of Manjibhai Ghoghari. He studied Class 12 at M. D. Patel Higher Secondary School, Gariyadhar and passed the examinations in 1986. He married Vimlaben Ghoghari.

== Career ==
Ghoghari won from Karanj Assembly constituency representing the Bharatiya Janata Party in the 2022 Gujarat Legislative Assembly election. He polled 60,493 votes and defeated his nearest rival, Manoj Sorathiya of the Aam Aadmi Party, by a margin of 35,974 votes. He first became an MLA winning the 2017 Gujarat Legislative Assembly election defeating advocate Bhumbhaliya Bhaveshbhai Govindbhai of the Indian National Congress.
