= Kishor Kanani =

Indian politician

Kishor Kanani (born 1962) is an Indian politician from Gujarat. He is a member of the Gujarat Legislative Assembly from Varachha Road Assembly constituency in Surat district. He won the 2022 Gujarat Legislative Assembly election representing the Bharatiya Janata Party.

== Early life and education ==
Kanani is from Varachha, Surat district, Gujarat. He is the son of Shivabhai Kanani. He studied Class 9 and Shri D.C. Kothari Secondary School, Varachha road, Surat and passed the examinations in 1977. Later, he discontinued his studies. HIs wife is a private teacher and also does embroidery work.

== Career ==
Kanani won from Varachha Road Assembly constituency representing the Bharatiya Janata Party in the 2022 Gujarat Legislative Assembly election. He polled 67,206 votes and defeated his nearest rival, Alpesh Kathiriya of Aam Aadmi Party, by a margin of 16,834 votes. He first became an MLA winning the 2017 Gujarat Legislative Assembly election defeating his closest rival by a margin of 13,998 votes.
