= Kapletha =

- village
- Location in Gujarat, India
- Coordinates: 21°03′N 72°54′E
- Country: India
- State: Gujarat

Languages
  - Official: Gujarati, Hindi
- Time zone: UTC+5:30 (IST)
- Website: www.suratmunicipal.gov.in

Kapletha is a village in Surat district in Gujarat, India. Situated approximately 21 kilometres (13 mi) south of Surat, the village population is approximately 2500. It has a very large Islamic university known as Jamiatul Qirat. Also, there is the river Mindhora which flows from the outer side of village. There are many brick factories around the village. Most of the villagers are in abroad mainly in the United Kingdom, the United States, Canada, South Africa, New Zealand, and Barbados Panama. The villagers' main occupation is farming. There is a small pond in the heart of village and also there is a restaurant named Sigdi on main Surat-Navsari road in Kapletha. Mahatma Gandhi, during his Dandi march journey, visited this village and crossed the river Mindhora. During that period there was no bridge over the river, so the villagers made a bridge with bullock cart and Mahatma Gandhi crossed the river and continued his journey towards Dandi. In this village, most people have Patel as their last name, also there are DEGIA, Aswat, Pandor, Chichwadiya, Sacha, Harpati, Dhimmar, Raja, Ukadia etc.
