= Raniamba =

- Neighbourhood
- Country: India
- State: Gujarat
- District: Surat

Government
  - Body: Surat Municipal Corporation

Languages
  - Official: Gujarati, Hindi
- Time zone: UTC+5:30 (IST)
- PIN: 394365
- Telephone code: 91261-XXX-XXXX
- Vehicle registration: GJ
- Lok Sabha constituency: Surat
- Civic agency: Surat Municipal Corporation
- Website: gujaratindia.com

Raniamba is an area located in Surat, India.

There is also a Raniamba village, in Songadh taluka in Surat district of Gujarat, India. It is about 86 km from the District headquarters Surat. Cities near Raniamba are Songadh, Vyara, Navsari and Ankleshwar.

Gujarati is the local language in Raniamba.
