= Udhana Assembly constituency =

Legislative Assembly constituency in Gujarat State, India

Coordinates: 21.14°N 72.84°E

Udhana
- Constituency No. 164 for the Gujarat Legislative Assembly

Constituency details
- Country: India
- Region: Western India
- State: Gujarat
- District: Surat
- Lok Sabha constituency: Navsari
- Established: 2008
- Total electors: 270,734
- Reservation: None

Member of Legislative Assembly
- 15th Gujarat Legislative Assembly
- Incumbent Manubhai M. Patel (Fogwa)
- Party: Bharatiya Janata Party
- Elected year: 2022

Udhana is one of the 182 Legislative Assembly constituencies of Gujarat state in India. It is part of Surat district. It came into existence after 2008 delimitation.

== List of segments ==
This assembly seat represents the following segments,

1. Surat City Taluka (Part) – Surat Municipal Corporation (Part) Ward No. – 53, 54, 55, 56, 66.

== Members of Legislative Assembly ==
- 2012 - Narottambhai Patel, Bharatiya Janata Party

Year	Member	Picture	Party
2017	Vivek Patel		Bharatiya Janata Party
2022	Manubhai M. Patel		Bharatiya Janata Party

== Election results ==
=== 2022 ===
Gujarat Assembly election, 2022: Udhana Assembly constituency
Party	Candidate	Votes	%	±%
BJP	Manubhai M. Patel (Fogwa)	93,999	63.16	
INC	Dhansukhbhai Bhagvatiprasad Rajput	24103	16.19	
AAP	Mahendrabhai Ravanbhai Patil	21741	14.61	
NOTA	None of the above	1820	1.22	
Majority			46.97	
Turnout				
Registered electors		266,771		
BJP hold		Swing		

=== 2017 ===
Gujarat Legislative Assembly Election, 2017: Udhana
Party	Candidate	Votes	%	±%
BJP	Vivek Narottambhai Patel	87,884	61.85	+3.98
INC	Satish Champakbhai Patel	45,356	31.92	−0.66
SS	Vilas Subhash Patil	2,901	2.04	New
Majority		42,528	29.93	+4.64
Turnout		1,42,096	60.82	−2.16
BJP hold		Swing		

=== 2012 ===
Gujarat Assembly Election, 2012
Party	Candidate	Votes	%	±%
BJP	Narotambhai Patel	74,946	57.87	
INC	Dhansukhbhai Rajput	42,192	32.58	
Majority		32,754	25.29	
Turnout		129,518	62.98	
BJP win (new seat)				

== See also ==
- List of constituencies of Gujarat Legislative Assembly
- Gujarat Legislative Assembly
