= Limbayat Assembly constituency =

Legislative Assembly constituency in Gujarat State, India

Coordinates: 21.169°N 72.865°E

Limbayat
- Constituency No. 163 for the Gujarat Legislative Assembly

Constituency details
- Country: India
- Region: Western India
- State: Gujarat
- District: Surat
- Lok Sabha constituency: Navsari
- Established: 2008
- Total electors: 305,333
- Reservation: None

Member of Legislative Assembly
- 15th Gujarat Legislative Assembly
- Incumbent Sangita Patil
- Party: Bharatiya Janata Party
- Elected year: 2022

Limbayat is one of the 182 Legislative Assembly constituencies of Gujarat state in India. It is part of Surat district.

== List of segments ==
This assembly seat represents the following segments,

1. Surat City Taluka (Part) – Surat Municipal Corporation (Part) Ward No. – 35, 49, 50, 51, 52.

== Member of Legislative Assembly ==
Year	Member	Picture	Party
2012	Sangita Patil		Bharatiya Janata Party
2017	Sangita Patil		Bharatiya Janata Party
2022	Sangita Patil		Bharatiya Janata Party

== Election results ==
=== 2022 ===
Gujarat Assembly election, 2022:Limbayat Assembly constituency
Party	Candidate	Votes	%	±%
BJP	Sangitaben Rajendra Patil	95696	53.44	
AAP	Pankajbhai Tayade	37687	21.05	
INC	Gopal D. Patil	29436	16.44	
AIMIM	Abdul Bashir Shaikh	5216	2.91	
NOTA	None of the above	1069	0.6	
Majority			32.39	
Turnout				
Registered electors		299,658		
BJP hold		Swing		

=== 2017 ===
Gujarat Legislative Assembly Election, 2017: Limbayat
Party	Candidate	Votes	%	±%
BJP	Sangita Patil	93,585	54.85	+1.79
INC	Dr. Ravindra Patil	61,634	36.12	+3.24
NCP	Akram Vahidulla Ansari	5,132	3.01	New
SS	Samrat Abhiman Patil	4,075	2.39	New
Majority		31,951	18.73	
Turnout		1,70,630	65.65	−1.36
Registered electors		259,916		
BJP hold		Swing		

=== 2012 ===
Gujarat Assembly Election, 2012
Party	Candidate	Votes	%	±%
BJP	Sangita Patil	90000	53.06	
INC	Suresh Sonvale	49,423	32.88	
Majority		30,321	32.88	
Turnout		1,50,298	67.01	
BJP win (new seat)				

== See also ==
- List of constituencies of Gujarat Legislative Assembly
- Surat district
