= Vesu =

Suburb in Surat, Gujarat, India

- suburb
- Location in Gujarat, India
- Coordinates: 21.13953°N 72.77069°E
- Country: India
- State: Gujarat
- District: Surat
- Talukas: Choriyasi

Languages
  - Official: Gujarati, Hindi,
- Time zone: UTC+5:30 (IST)
- PIN: 395007
- Vehicle registration: GJ-5
- Nearest city: Surat

Vesu is a suburban area located in South West Zone, of Surat. Vesu is the newest area to develop in terms of public transport infrastructure, residential complexes, business parks and shopping arcades.

== About ==
Vesu Is 13 km from Surat Railway station and 5 km from Surat Airport.

== See also ==
- Bhimrad
- List of tourist attractions in Surat
