= Kanti Balar =

Indian politician

- Born: 1955 (age 70–71)
- Occupation: Politician

Kantibhai Balar (born 1955) is an Indian politician from Gujarat. He is a member of the Gujarat Legislative Assembly from Surat North. He won the 2022 Gujarat Legislative Assembly election representing the Bharatiya Janata Party.

== Early life and education ==
Balar is from Surat, Surat district, Gujarat. He is the son of Himmatbhai Balar. He passed Class 4 at Primary School, Shakhpur, Lathi taluk, Amreli district and later discontinued his studies.

== Career ==
Balar won from Surat North Assembly constituency representing the Bharatiya Janata Party in the 2022 Gujarat Legislative Assembly election. He polled 57,117 votes and defeated his nearest rival, Mahendra Navadiya of the Aam Aadmi Party, by a margin of 34,293 votes. He first became an MLA winning the 2017 Gujarat Legislative Assembly election defeating Kachhadiya Dineshbhai Manubhai of the Indian National Congress by a margin of 20,022 votes.
