= Bhimrad =

- suburb
- Location in Gujarat, India Bhimrad (India)
- Coordinates: 21.1285°N 72.8010°E
- Country: India
- State: Gujarat
- District: Surat District
- Talukas: Choriyasi

Languages
  - Official: Gujarati, Hindi,
- Time zone: UTC+5:30 (IST)
- PIN: 395007
- Vehicle registration: GJ-05
- Lok Sabha constituency: Navsari parliamentary constituency

Bhimrad is a suburban area located in South West Zone of Surat. Bhimrad is the newest area to develop in terms of public transport infrastructure, residential complexes, business parks, and shopping arcades. Bhimrad is where the historic Salt March of Dandi was led by Gandhi.

== Geography ==
It is nearby Sarsana and Khajod. It is 1 km (0.62 mi) away from the Surat Diamond Bourse and Dream City Khajod. Bhimrad Is 12 km (7.5 mi) from Surat Railway station and 10 km (6.2 mi) from Surat Airport. The proposed Surat Metro will pass from Bhimrad.

== See also ==
- List of tourist attractions in Surat
