= Surat district =

- District of Gujarat
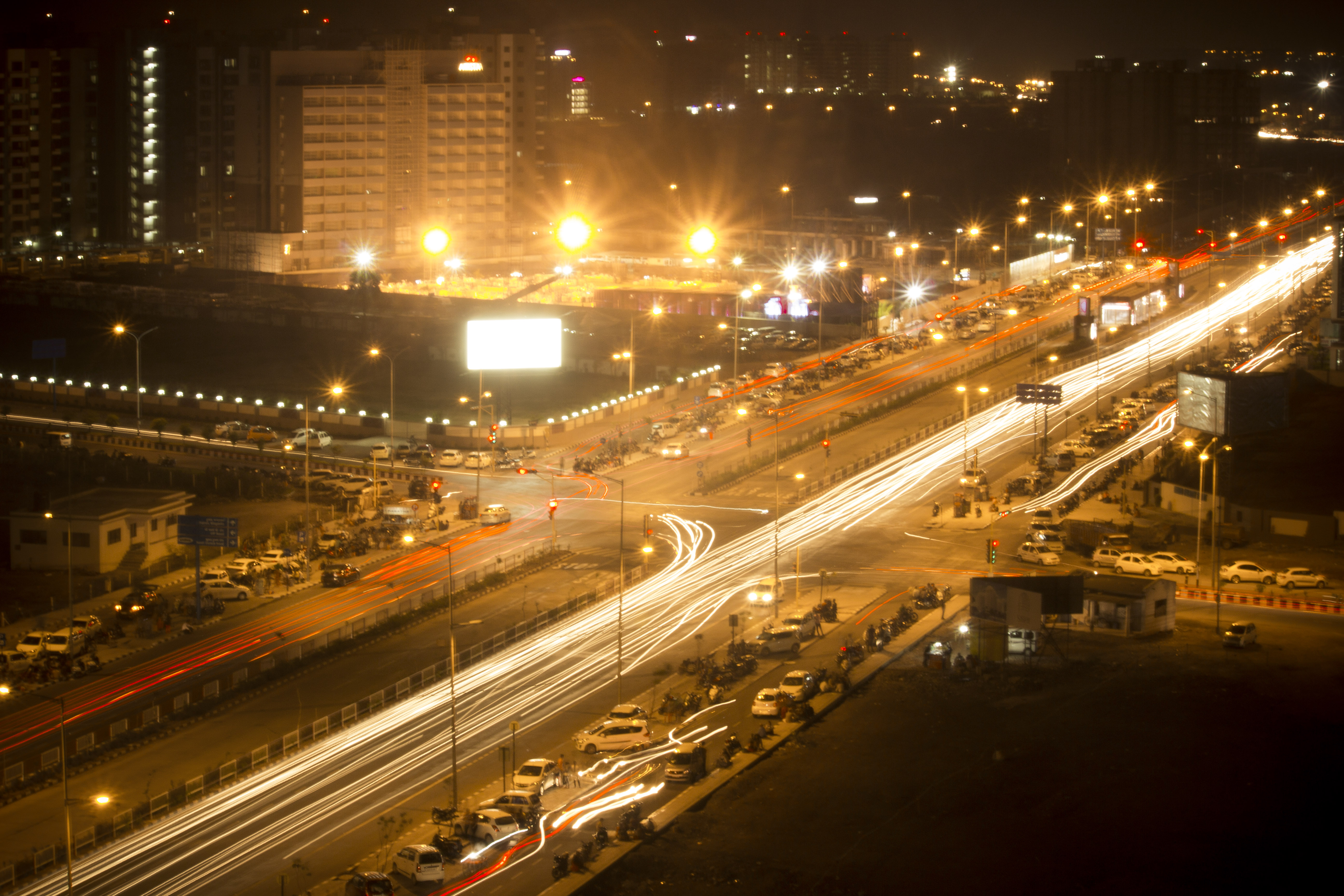
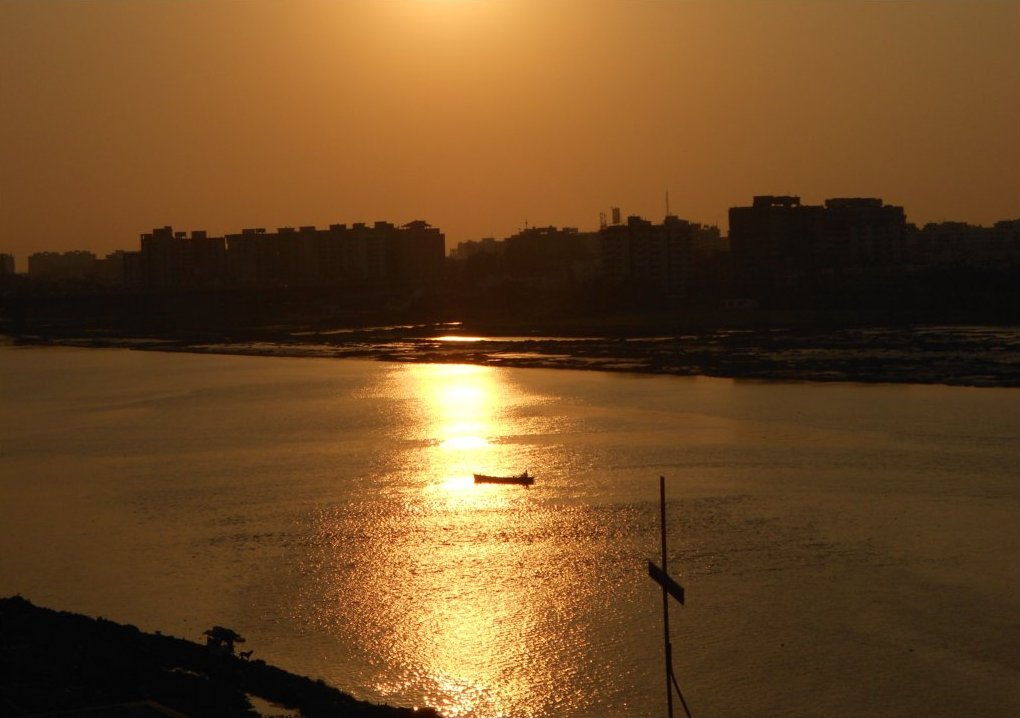
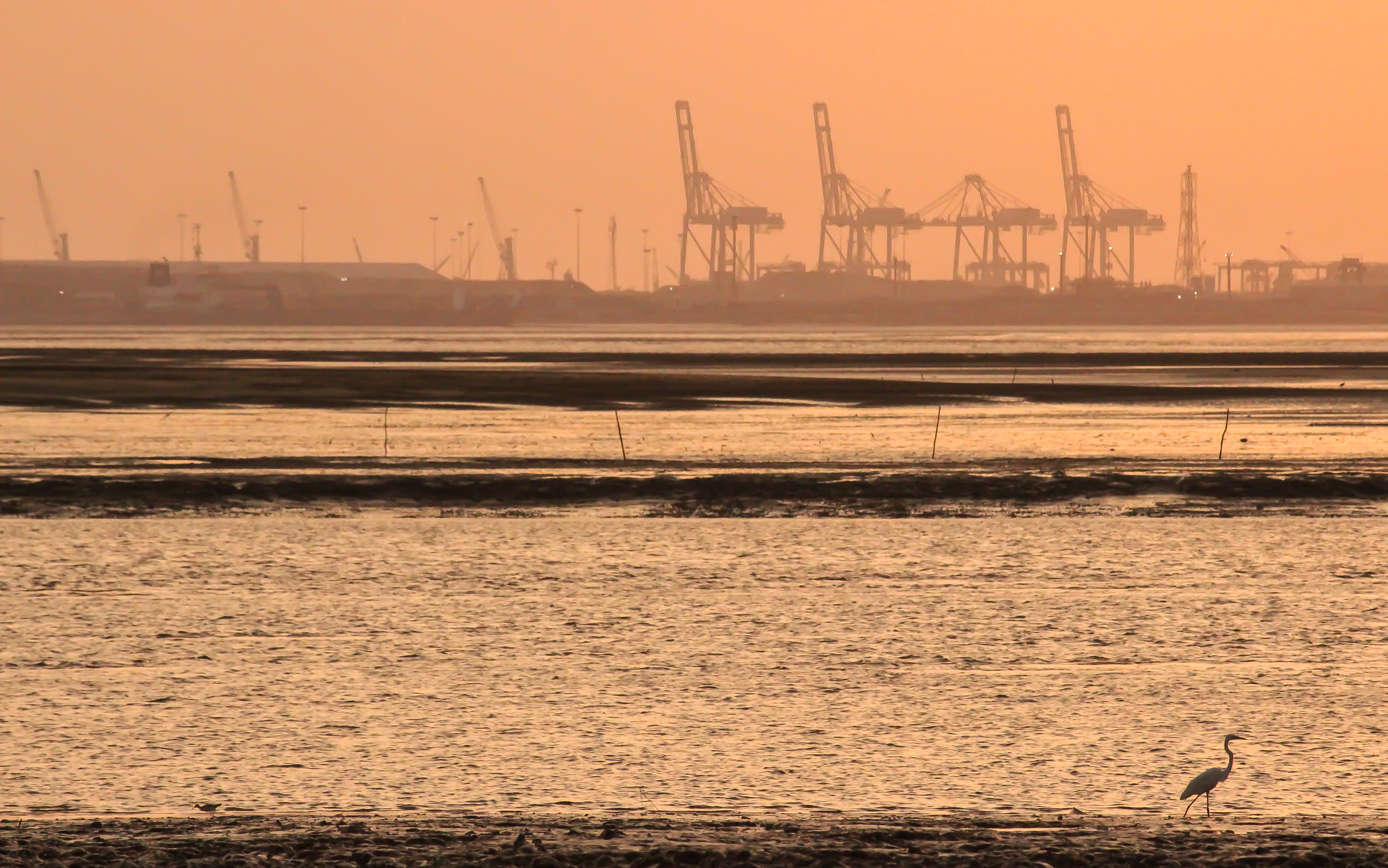
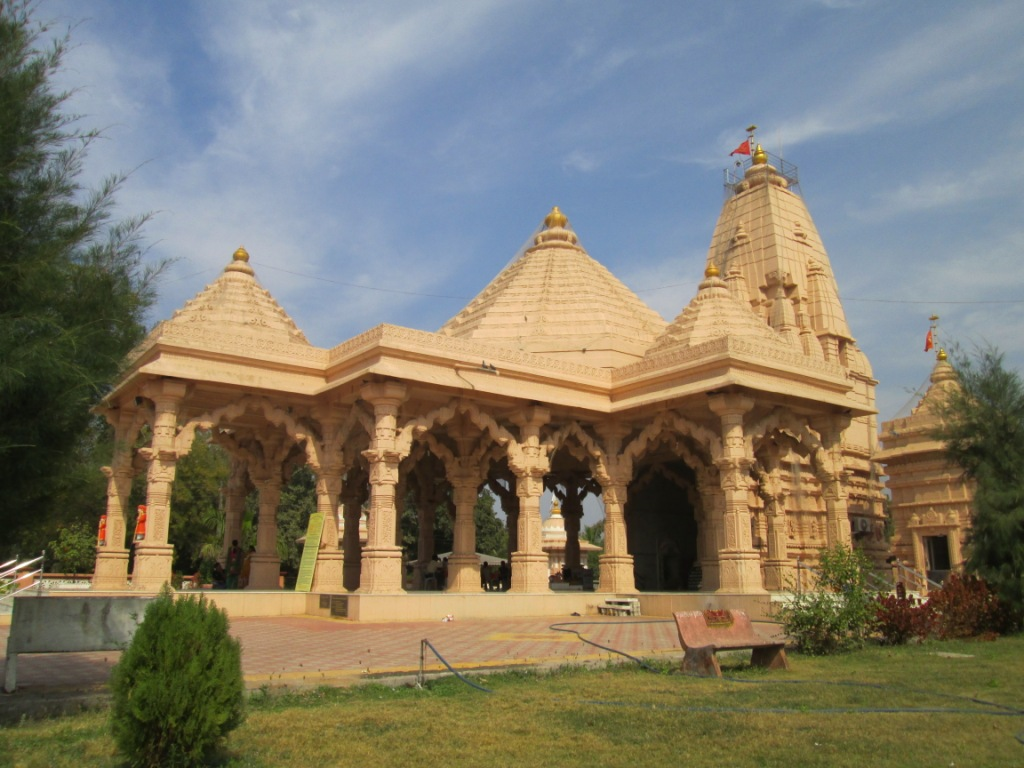
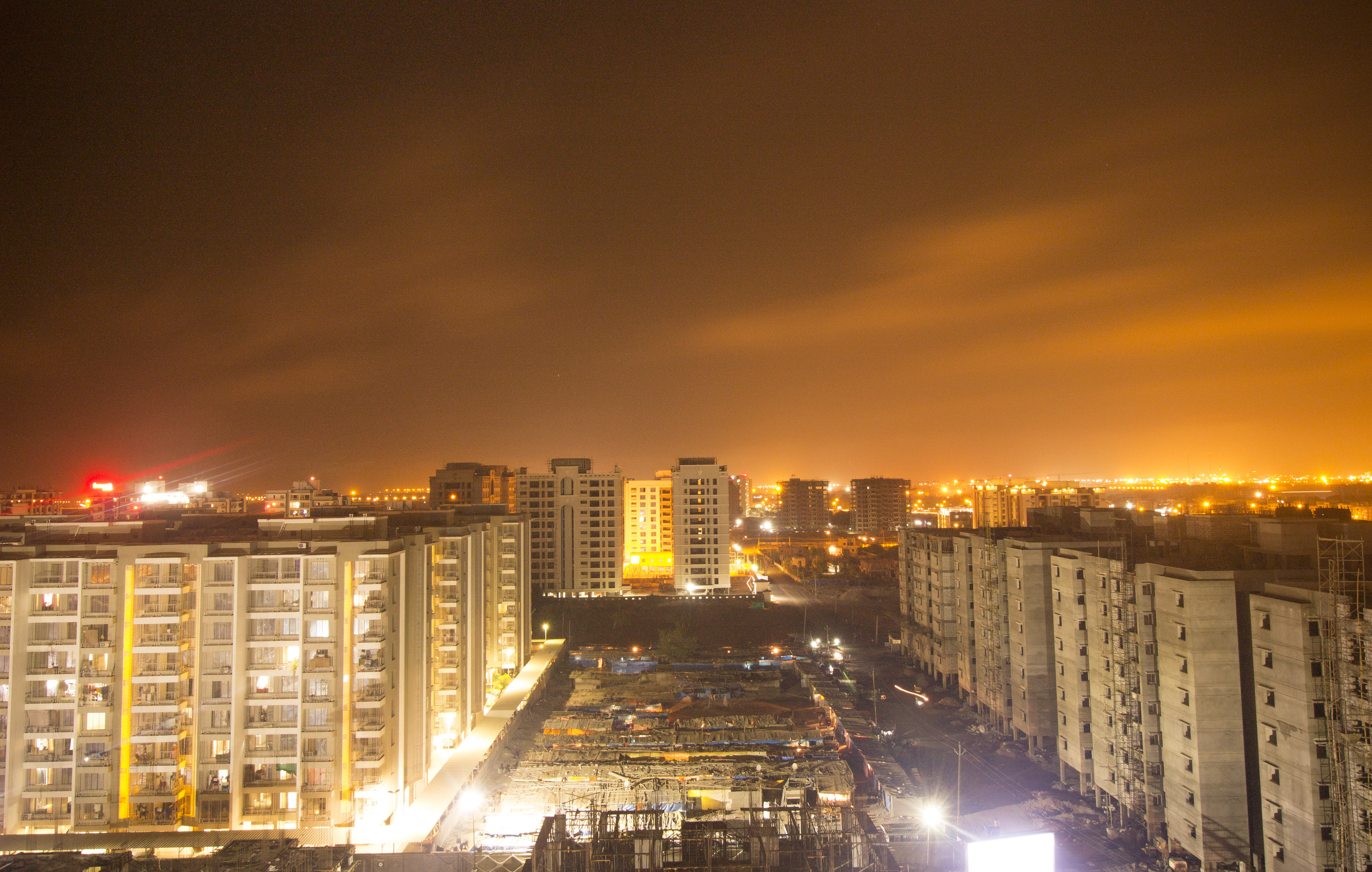
- Clockwise from top-left: University Road, Tapi River, Kedareshwar Temple in Bardoli, Apartments in Vesu, Dumas Beach and Hazira Port
- Interactive Map Outlining Surat District
- Location of district in Gujarat
- Coordinates: 20°55′N 73°03′E
- Country: India
- State: Gujarat
- Headquarters: Surat

Area
  - Total: 4,418 km^{2} (1,706 sq mi)

Population (2023)
  - Total: 9,758,263
  - Rank: 10 of 640 in India; 2 of 33 in Gujarat
  - Density: 2,209/km^{2} (5,721/sq mi)

Languages
  - Official: Gujarati, Hindi
- Time zone: UTC+5:30 (IST)
- Vehicle registration: GJ 05, GJ 19 & GJ 28
- Website: surat.gujarat.gov.in

Surat district is a district in the state of Gujarat, India, with Surat city as the administrative headquarters. It is surrounded by Bharuch, Narmada (North), Navsari (South) districts and east Tapi district To the west is the Gulf of Cambay. It is the second-most advanced district in Gujarat. It had a population of 6,081,322, of which 79.68% were urban as of 2011. On 2 October 2007 Surat district was split into two by the creation of a new Tapi district, under the Surat District Re-organisation Act 2007.

During the Quit India Movement of Mahatma Gandhi in 1942, A large number of 3,000 Koli cultivators from Matwad, Karadi, Machhad and Kothmadi in Surat District fought against British soldiers at Matwad with lathis and dharias on 21 August 1942. In this fight, four persons including one policeman died. The kolis also snatched away four police muskets and two bayonets. Kolis smashed up the Jalalpore Railway Station, removed the Rails and burnt down the post office. After this, the situation in the neighbouring villages of Borsad, Anand and Thasra taluqas became so aggravated that British troops was marched through the villages between 22 and 24 August 1942.

As of 2011 it is the 12th most populous district of India (out of 640), and the second most populous district of Gujarat (out of 33) after Ahmadabad.

== Geography ==
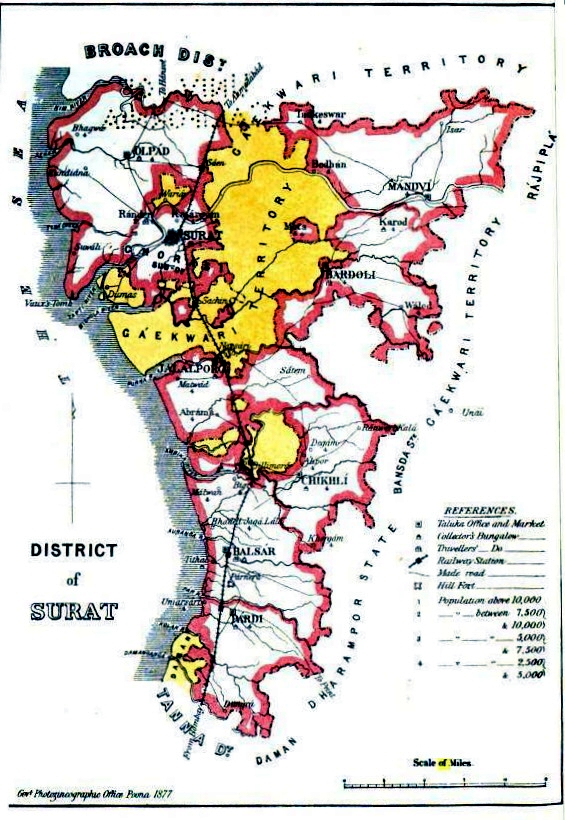
Map of Surat district, Bombay Presidency, British India 1877

Surat District's total area is 4,418 km ^{2}, and the density of Surat District was 1,376 per km ^{2} at the 2011 Census. The region has the highest population density in the State, followed by Ahmedabad region. There are 10 sub-districts in Surat district. These include Surat city, Mandvi, Bardoli, Palsana, Mahuva, Kamrej, Mangrol, Choryasi, Olpad and Umarpada.

=== Climate ===
Surat has a tropical savanna climate (Köppen: Aw), moderated strongly by the Sea to the Gulf of Cambay. The summer begins in early March and lasts until June. April and May are the hottest months, the average maximum temperature being 37 °C (99 °F). Monsoon begins in late June, and the city receives about 1,200 millimetres (47 in) of rain by the end of September, with the average maximum being 32 °C (90 °F) during those months. October and November see the retreat of the monsoon and a return of high temperatures until late November. Winter starts in December and ends in late February, with average mean temperatures of around 23 °C (73 °F), and negligible rain.

Since the 20th century, Surat has experienced 14 floods. In 1968, most parts of the city were flooded and in 1994 a flood caused a country-wide plague outbreak, Surat being the epicenter. In 1998, 30 per cent of Surat had gone under water due to flooding in Tapti river following release of water from Ukai dam located 90 km from Surat and in Aug, 2006 more than 95 per cent of the city was under Tapti river waters, killing more than 120 people, stranding tens of thousands in their homes without food or electricity and closing businesses and schools for weeks.

Climate data for Surat, Gujarat (1932–1980)
| Month | Jan | Feb | Mar | Apr | May | Jun | Jul | Aug | Sep | Oct | Nov | Dec | Year |
|---|---|---|---|---|---|---|---|---|---|---|---|---|---|
Source 1: Sistema de Clasificación Bioclimática Mundial
Source 2: World Climate Guide (sunshine only)

== Talukas ==
- Surat City (included Udhna, Katargam, Puna & Majura)
- Bardoli
- Choryasi
- Kamrej
- Mandavi
- Mahuva
- Mangrol
- Olpad
- Palsana
- Umarpada
- Ambika
- Areth

== Demographics ==
Historical population
| Year | Pop. | ±% p.a. |
|---|---|---|
| 1901 | 462,643 | — |
| 1911 | 494,771 | +0.67% |
| 1921 | 496,671 | +0.04% |
| 1931 | 546,018 | +0.95% |
| 1941 | 658,719 | +1.89% |
| 1951 | 781,625 | +1.73% |
| 1961 | 984,689 | +2.34% |
| 1971 | 1,329,422 | +3.05% |
| 1981 | 1,965,240 | +3.99% |
| 1991 | 2,770,921 | +3.50% |
| 2001 | 4,275,540 | +4.43% |
| 2023 | 9,758,263 | +3.82% |

According to the 2011 census Surat district has a population of 6,081,322, roughly equal to the nation of El Salvador or the US state of Missouri. This gives it a ranking of 12th in India (out of a total of 640). The district has a population density of 1,376 inhabitants per square kilometre (3,560/sq mi) . Its population growth rate was 42.24% over the decade 2001–2011 and 54.30% over the decade 1991–2001. Surat has a sex ratio of 788 females for every 1000 males, and a literacy rate of 86.5%. 79.74% of the population lives in urban areas. Scheduled Castes and Scheduled Tribes make up 2.60% and 14.09% of the population respectively.

=== Religion ===
Religions in Surat district (2011)
| Hinduism | 86.50% |
| Islam | 10.87% |
| Jainism | 1.86% |
| Other or not stated | 0.77% |
Distribution of religions

Hinduism is the main religion. Islam and Jainism are also present.

=== Language ===
Languages of Surat district (2011)
1. Gujarati (60.1%)
2. Hindi (19.6%)
3. Marathi (8.03%)
4. Odia (2.60%)
5. Urdu (2.47%)
6. Marwari (1.44%)
7. Bhojpuri (1.30%)
8. Chodri (1.01%)
9. Others (3.47%)

At the time of the 2011 census, 60.06% of the population spoke Gujarati, 19.62% Hindi, 8.03% Marathi, 2.60% Odia, 2.47% Urdu, 1.44% Marwari, 1.30% Bhojpuri and 1.01% Chodri as their first language.

== Politics ==
| District | No. | Constituency | Name | Party | Remarks |
|---|---|---|---|---|---|
| Surat | 155 | Olpad | Mukesh Patel | MoS | |
| Surat | 156 | Mangrol (Surat) (ST) | Ganpat Vasava | | |
| Surat | 157 | Mandvi (Surat) (ST) | Kunvarji Halpati | MoS | |
| Surat | 158 | Kamrej | Prafulbhai Pansheriya | MoS | |
| Surat | 159 | Surat East | Arvind Rana | | |
| Surat | 160 | Surat North | Kanti Balar | | |
| Surat | 161 | Varachha Road | Kishor Kanani | | |
| Surat | 162 | Karanj | Pravin Ghoghari | | |
| Surat | 163 | Limbayat | Sangita Patil | | |
| Surat | 164 | Udhana | Manu Patel | | |
| Surat | 165 | Majura | Harsh Sanghavi | MoS(I/C) | |
| Surat | 166 | Katargam | Vinod Moradiya | | |
| Surat | 167 | Surat West | Purnesh Modi | | |
| Surat | 168 | Choryasi | Sandip Desai | | |
| Surat | 169 | Bardoli (SC) | Ishwarbhai Parmar | | |
| Surat | 170 | Mahuva (Surat) (ST) | Mohanbhai Dhodia | | |

== Culture ==
Places of tourist interest in Surat include the beautiful beaches of Dumas and Ubhrat, the Swaminarayan Mandir, the Science Centre, Surat, the village of Bardoli among many others.

== Industry at a Glance ==
Industry and data
| No | Head | Unit | Particulars |
|---|---|---|---|
| 1 | REGISTERED INDUSTRIAL UNIT | Number | 52,252 |
| 2 | TOTAL INDUSTRIAL UNIT | Number | 52,252 |
| 3 | REGISTERED MEDIUM & LARGE UNIT | Number | 805 |
| 4 | ESTIMATED AVERAGE NO. OF DAILY & WORKER EMPLOYED IN SMALL SCALE INDUSTRIES | Number | 1,45,527 |
| 5 | EMPLOYMENT IN LARGE & MEDIUM INDUSTRIES | Number | 1,68,987 |
| 6 | NO. OF INDUSTRIAL AREA | Number | 10 |
| 7 | TURNOVER OF SMALL SCALE INDUSTRIES | Rs. (in Lacs) | 6,180 |
| 8 | TURNOVER OF MEDIUM & LARGE SCALE INDUSTRIES | Rs. (in Lacs) | 34,862 |

The above details has been taken from Brief Industrial Profile of Surat District

== Notable personalities ==
- Narmadashankar Dave (1833–1886) Author, poet, scholar and public speaker. Born in Surat.
- Shaikh Randeri (a.k.a. Shaikh Raneri) was famous for spreading the Islamic faith to Indonesia.
- Navalram (1836–1888) Author and literary critic. Born in Surat.
- Ranjitram Mehta (1881–1917) Author. Born in Surat.
- Naval Hormusji Tata (1904–1989) Industrialist, Tata Family. Born in Surat.
- Gunvant Shah (1937– ) Author. Born in Rander, Surat.
- Hardik Pandya (1993–) Cricketer. Born in Choryasi, Surat.
- Wadia family Industrialists. From Surat.

== See also ==
- List of tourist attractions in Surat
- Barbodhan
- Raniamba
- Udhana Taluka
