= Big-game hunting =

Hunting of large animals

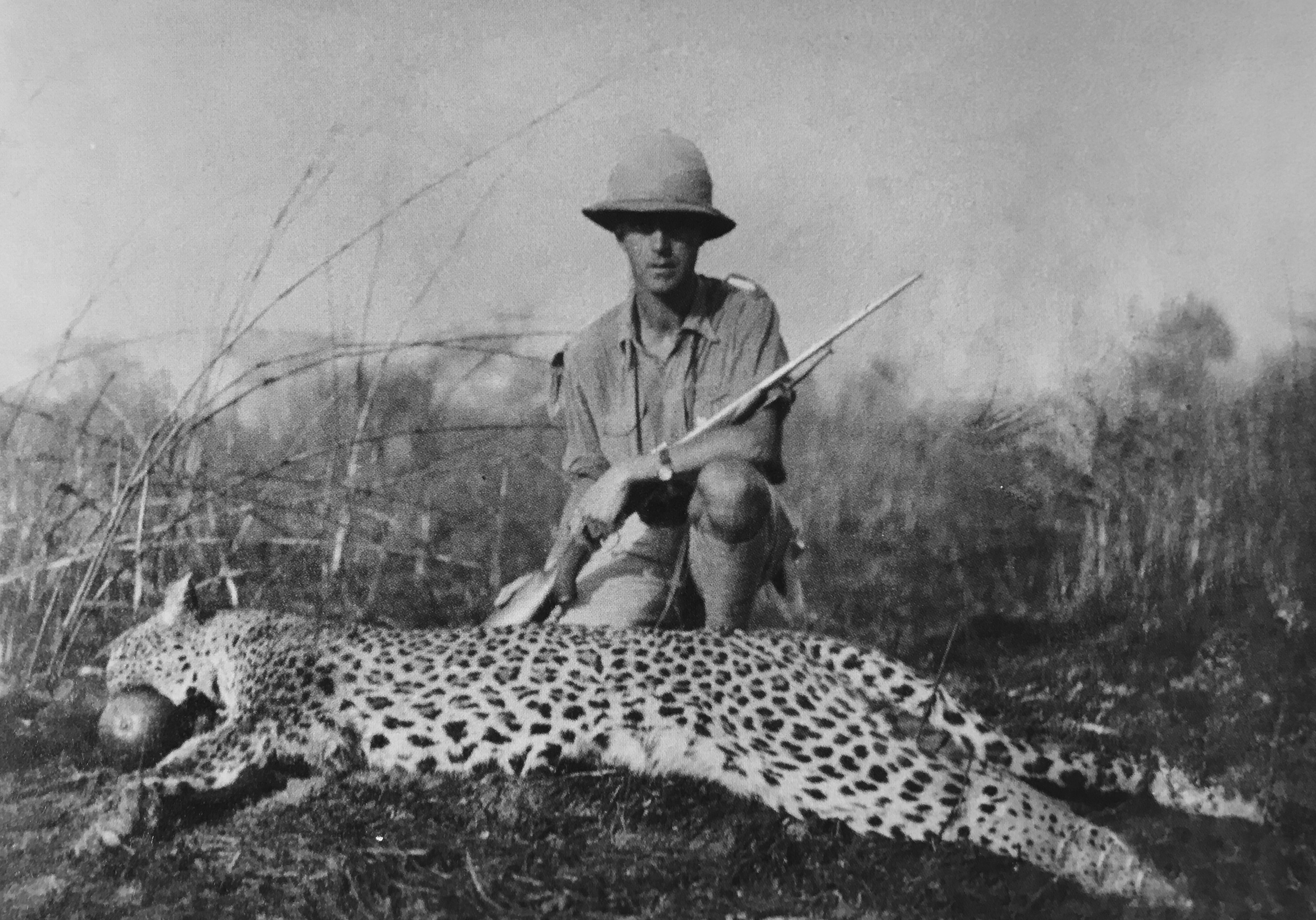
The Duke of Algeciras with a trophy African leopard, one of the 'Big Five', Southern Rhodesia, 1926

Big-game hunting is the hunting of large game animals for trophies, taxidermy, meat, and commercially valuable animal by-products (such as horns, antlers, tusks, bones, fur, body fat, or special organs). The term is often associated with the hunting of Africa's "Big Five" game (lion, African elephant, Cape buffalo, African leopard, and African rhinoceros), and Indian rhinoceros and Bengal tigers on the Indian subcontinent.

== History ==
Hunting of big game for food is an ancient practice, possibly arising with the emergence of Homo sapiens (anatomically modern humans), and possibly pre-dating it, given the known propensity of other great apes to hunt, and even eat their own species. The Schöningen spears and their correlation of finds are evidence that complex technological skills already existed 300,000 years ago, and are the first obvious proof of an active big game hunt. H. heidelbergensis already had intellectual and cognitive skills like anticipatory planning, thinking and acting that so far have only been attributed to modern man. Based on cave paintings, it appears that early man hunted mammoth in groups, using a combination of spears or large rocks, or alternatively driving the animal off a cliff.

The Clovis points (North America) and Fishtail projectile points (South America) that developed shortly after the initial colonisation of the Americas around 13,000 years ago are thought to have been primarily used for big game hunting, which may have been a contributing factor in the extinction of most large mammals on these continents.

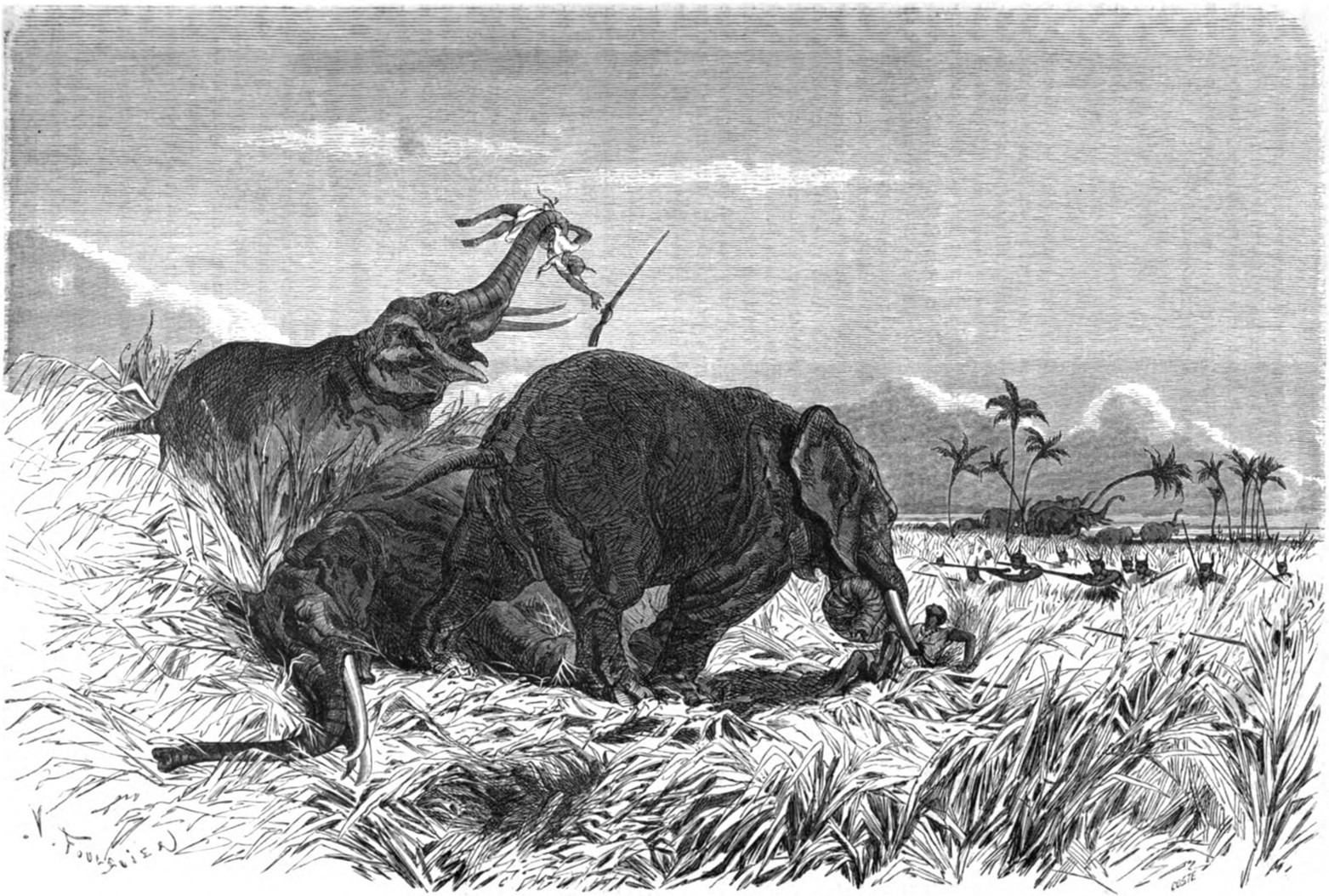
Elephant hunting by the Dahomey Amazons depicted in Le Tour du Monde in 1863

=== 19th and 20th centuries ===
Big-game hunting is also a sport pursued to collect specimens for museums, recreation, and as a hobby. Sharply rising in popularity during the Victorian Era, it peaked during the 20th century, and includes many famous big game hunters. Among them are Philip Percival, who guided Theodore Roosevelt and Ernest Hemingway, themselves famous big game hunters; Bror von Blixen-Finecke, a friend of Percival's and husband of writer Isak Dinesen who wrote Out of Africa; Denys Finch Hatton, who was also a character in Dinesen's book; Major Percy Horace Gordon Powell-Cotton; and others. Many big-game hunters are also conservationists (Roosevelt and Hemingway are examples), and currently big-game hunting in Africa helps pay for conservation efforts, with very large fees from the hunters going directly to wildlife management.

== Methods ==
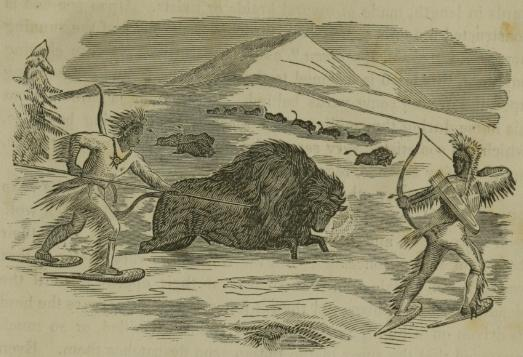
Native Americans hunting bison, from an 1855 illustration

Various big-game hunting methods have been developed over centuries. The main methods in use today are stalking, ambush (hunting from blinds), driving, trapping or a combination thereof. Calling and baiting may be used to increase the effectiveness of any method or combination.

The stalking method consists of following the animal until the kill can be made. Generally hunters approach the game stealthily, camouflaging their appearance, scent or sound depending on which sense is most likely to reveal them to their prey under the conditions. Stalks can routinely persist for days for certain game under certain conditions. Tracking game for stalking is a skill that has been learned by hunters since prehistoric times, and is used with success today.

The ambush method, including hunting from blinds, consists of setting up or finding means of cover or concealment to assist in reducing the likelihood of the game detecting the hunter while the hunter waits in ambush or approaches the prey. Ground blinds, tree stands, cocking-cloths, dugout blinds, and stand-alone structures are all used as blinds in hunting today. All of these blinds are used in the ambush method. Cocking-cloths, or stalking blinds, are used in stalking prey but may still be considered as an ambush. Generally, baiting big-game includes the use of blinds; all the methods described herein may be used in combination.

Driving game as a hunting method is the act of directing the movement of the animal in order to kill it. A montería is an example of this. Game may be driven to a trap; to a fall that will kill it, such as over a cliff; or to a position where the hunter may make the kill. Driving is accomplished by sending an agent, usually dogs or people, through the terrain where the animal is believed to be, and making enough noise or using other devices to push the animal to move in the desired direction.

The use of vehicles in stalking and driving game can increase hunters' range and speed, and therefore, their effectiveness. Vehicles may also be used as blinds. Ground and air vehicles have been used in hunting big game, both for scouting game location and for the stalk.

== Weapons ==
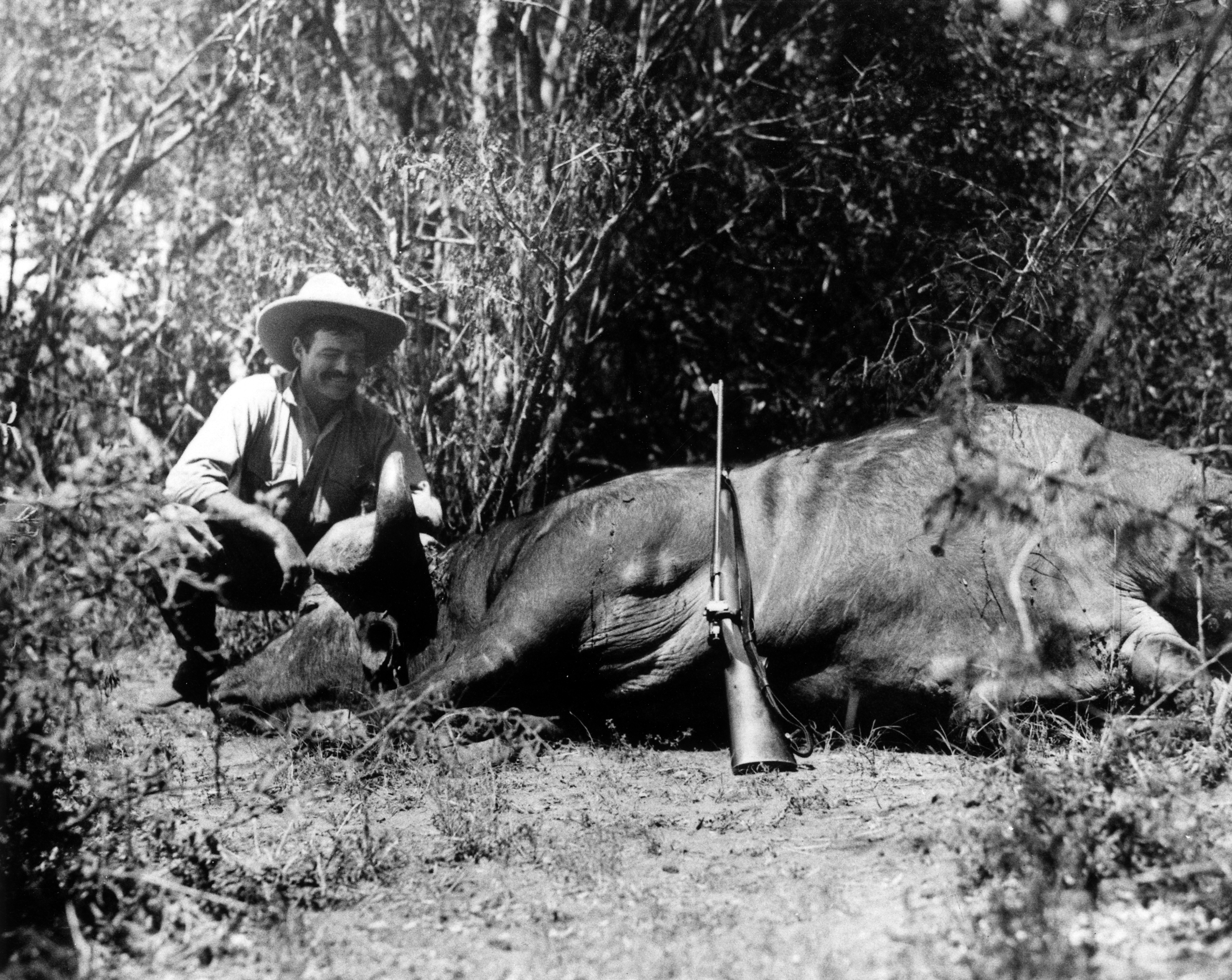
Ernest Hemingway on Safari in Africa

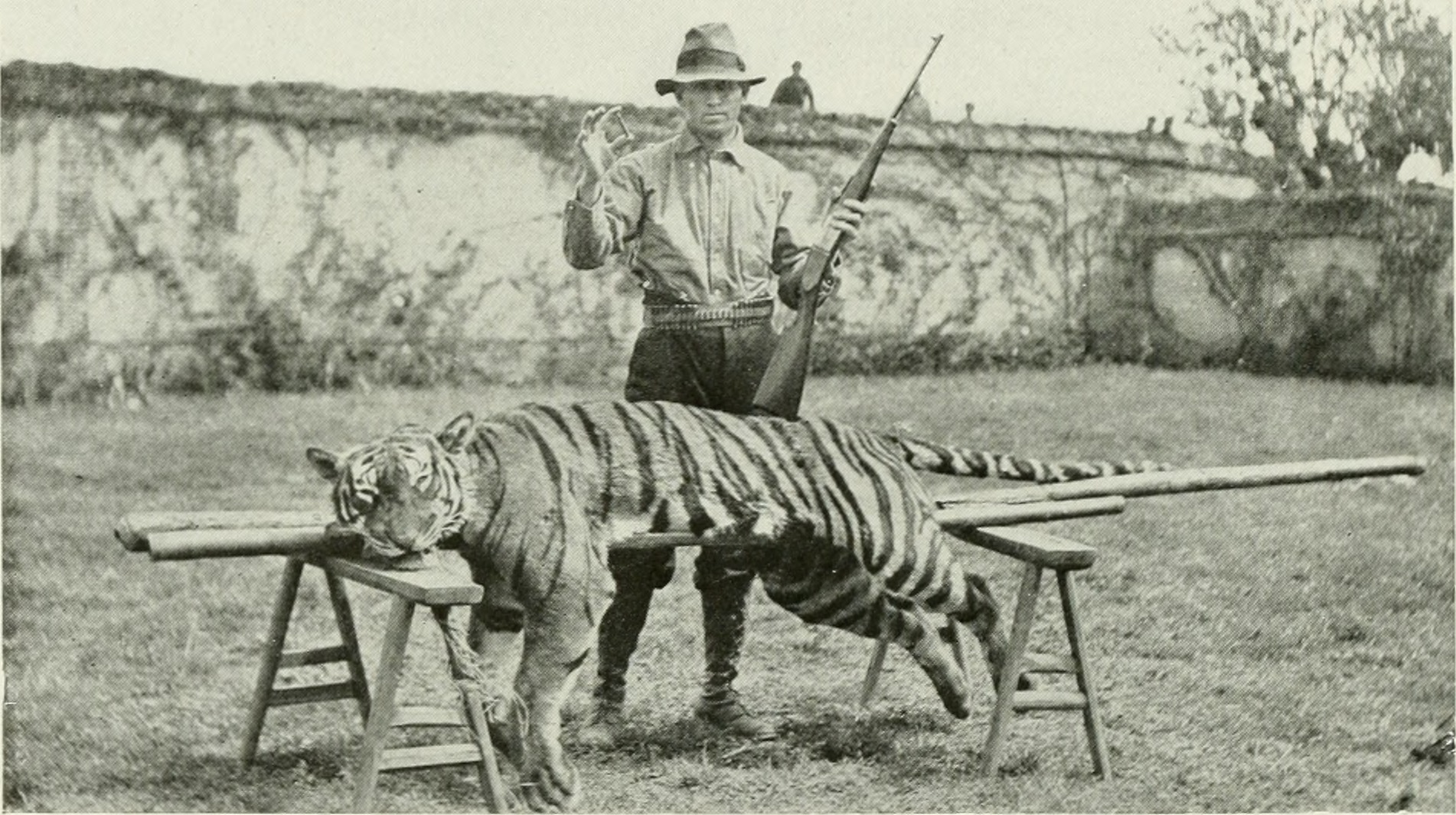
400 pound tiger taken by Reverend H. R. Caldwell using a Savage Model 99 chambered for .22 Savage Hi-Power

Portable hand-held weapons used for big-game hunting include firearms, bows, spears, and spear-throwers, among other long-range weapons, as well as close-range weapons such as hammers, axes, and knives, among other bladed and blunt weapons.

By far, the most common weapon used by hunters is the firearm, and the most common firearm is long-barreled rifles. Other firearms, such as shotguns and handguns, are also used less frequently in big-game hunting.

Large-caliber ammunition is considered to be effective in taking down large game humanely. Big-game hunting ethics require a clean, humane kill, and hunters generally aim for this outcome. Advances in ammunition and the guns to match have made longer-range kills of big game possible with margins of error considered tolerable. Some common calibers and types of ammunition for big-game hunting include .30-30 Winchester, .308 Winchester, .30-06 Springfield, .300 Winchester Magnum, and .358 Winchester. The calibers and types of ammunition, and the firearms to shoot them, are numerous, and the ballistics is continues to develop to allow hunting in a variety of situations. Bullet weight and shape, cartridge size, powder load, and type. Many variables within firearms ammunition is continuously changing.

Bow and arrow hunting is popular and effective among skilled hunters for big game. There is a variety of types of bows available, including long bows, short bows, recurve bows, compound bows, and crossbows, all made of various materials. Arrows are also made from various materials, including wood, fiberglass, carbon fiber, and others. Arrowheads have different configurations and materials as well.

Primitive hunting using spears, spear-throwers, and other similar weapons is a skill that is popular among hunters seeking greater challenge and knowledge than more conventional weaponry.

== Hunting ethics ==
With greater competition among hunters and given increasingly scarce resources, the need for ethical behavior from big game hunters has increased proportionately. The Boone and Crockett Club and Pope and Young Club (for bow hunters) both promote fair chase hunting. The Spanish philosopher José Ortega y Gasset in his famous book Meditations on Hunting promoted a mindful approach to hunting. Author James Posewitz, in his book Beyond Fair Chase: The Ethic and Tradition of Hunting, wrote:

Fundamental to ethical hunting is the idea of fair chase. This concept addresses the balance between the hunter and the hunted. It is a balance that allows hunters to occasionally succeed while animals generally avoid being taken.

Another author, Allen Morris Jones, in his book A Quiet Place of Violence: Hunting and Ethics in the Missouri River Breaks, argues that hunting is right insofar as it returns us to the natural context from which we evolved, and wrong insofar as it further removes us. Even in the context of trophy hunting, we must eat what we kill, for instance, given that our evolved role was one of predation.

== Economic impact ==
There are examples of the economic and conservation value of big-game hunting in several places. The Bubye Valley Conservancy in Zimbabwe has successfully managed lion and rhinoceros populations through hunting fees. In North America, the State of California estimates that the economic impact of big-game hunting in that state was $263,702,757 in 2016. Also in North America, the State of Wyoming estimates that the economic impact of big-game hunting in 2015 was $224 million. The examples of large economic impacts of big-game hunting abound, and many studies exist of the high positive effects wherever it is tried and managed well.

== Impact on wildlife conservation ==
Big game populations across the globe have collapsed in the last centuries and particularly in recent decades due to both legal and illegal big game hunting. Due to persistent hunting and poaching, elephant populations have dropped from circa 1.3 million in the 1970s to less than half a million today. At the beginning of the 20th century, 500,000 rhinos roamed Africa and Asia. By 1970, rhino numbers dropped to 70,000, and today, as few as 29,000 rhinos remain in the wild. Very few rhinos survive outside national parks and reserves due to persistent poaching and habitat loss over many decades. The white rhinoceros is an exception, as its numbers in Africa have increased from 100 in 1916 to more than 18,000 in 2016 due largely to the increase in private game reserves intended for hunting. Some hunts can generate fees of hundreds of thousands of dollars.

== See also ==
- List of famous big game hunters
- Big-game fishing
- Green hunting
