= Waterfowl hunting =

Practice of hunting waterfowl for food and sport

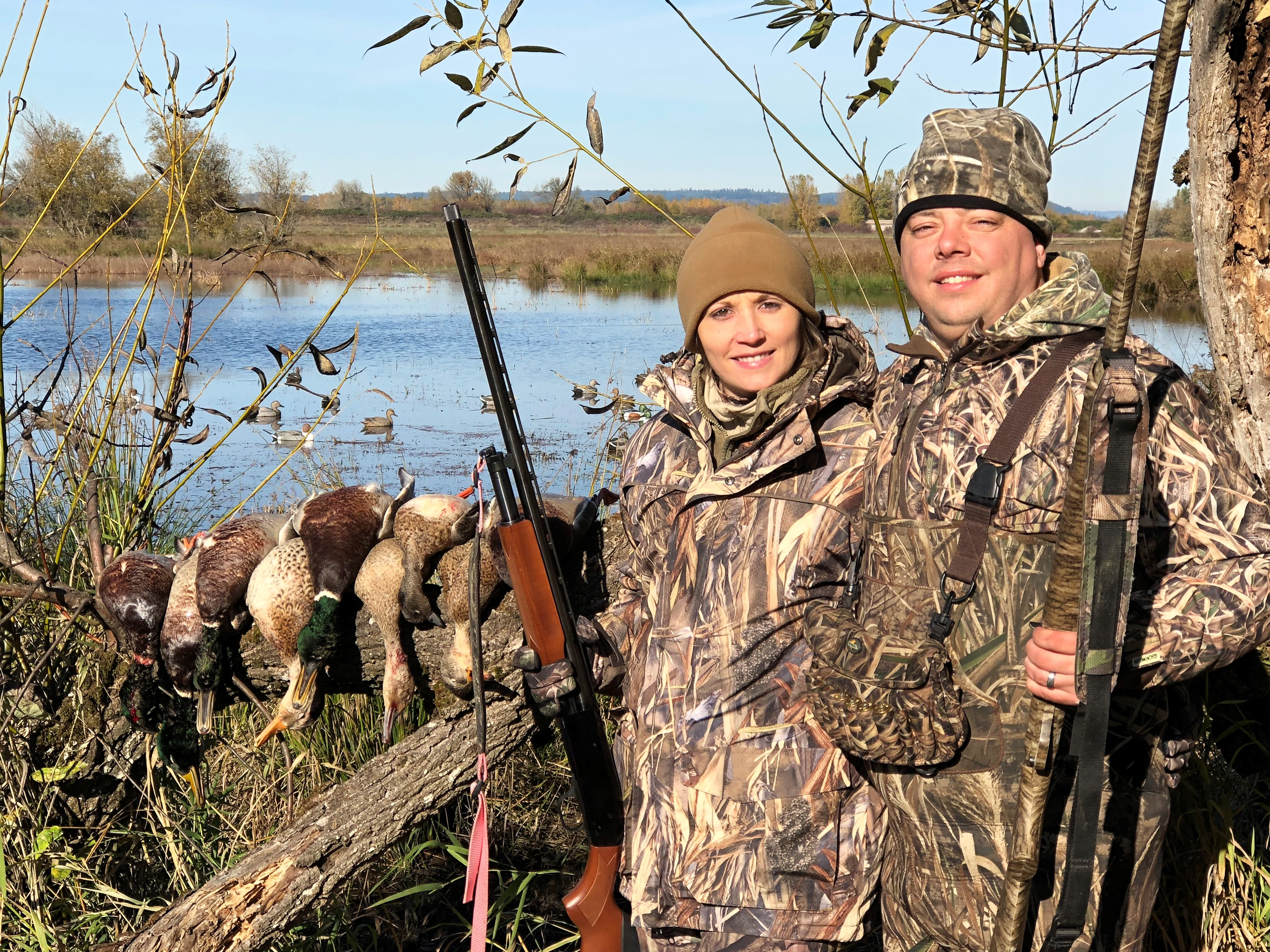
Waterfowl hunters at Ridgefield National Wildlife Refuge.

Waterfowl hunting is the practice of hunting aquatic birds such as ducks, geese and other waterfowls or shorebirds for sport and meat. Waterfowl are hunted in crop fields where they feed, or in areas with bodies of water such as rivers, lakes, ponds, wetlands, sloughs, or coasts. There are around 3 million waterfowl hunters in the United States alone.

== History ==
Wild waterfowl have been hunted for meat, down, and feathers worldwide since prehistoric times. Ducks, geese, and swans appear in European cave paintings from the last ice age. The mural in the ancient Egyptian tomb of Khnumhotep II shows a man in a hunting blind capturing swimming ducks in a trap. Muscovy ducks were depicted in the art of the Moche culture of ancient Peru.

=== Rise of modern waterfowl hunting ===
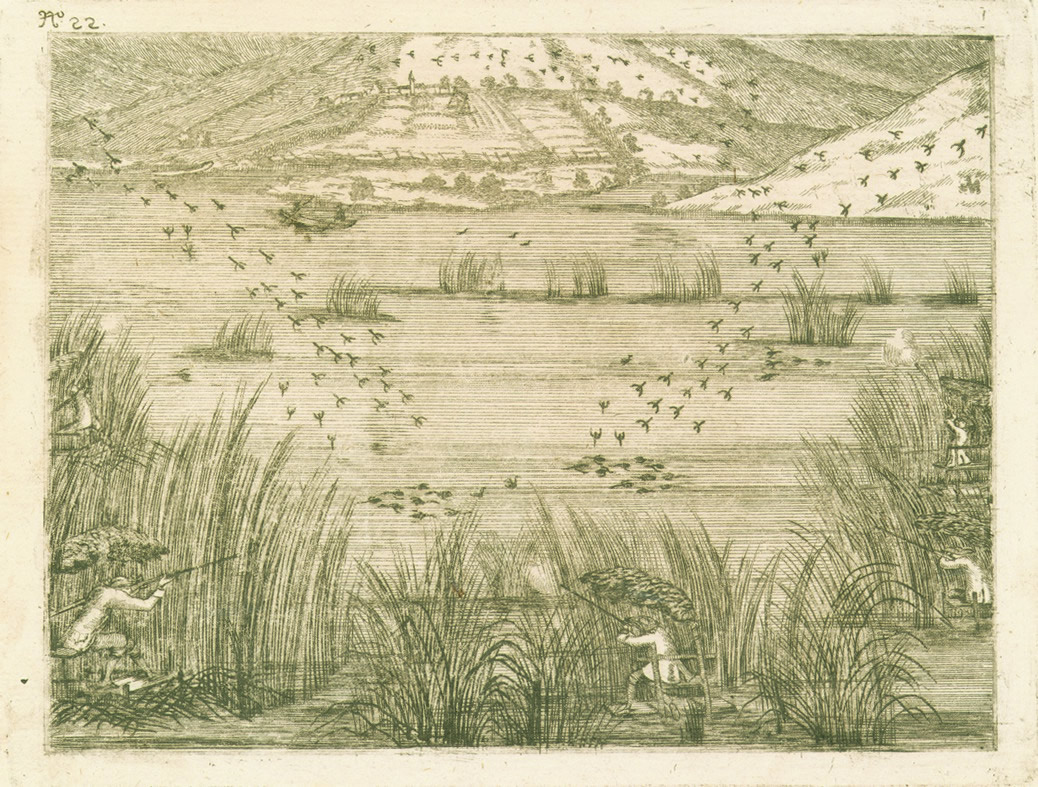
Duck hunting outside Lanišče, by Franz Anton von Steinberg, 1759.

Modern waterfowl hunting began in the 17th century with the matchlock rifle. Later flintlock blunderbuss and percussion cap guns were used. Shotguns were loaded with black powder and lead shot through the muzzle until the late 19th century. The transition from muzzle to breechloading shotguns was largely driven by innovations made by gunmakers such as Joseph Manton, at which time wildfowling was extremely popular in England. Both the shotgun choke and smokeless powder was invented in the late 19th century which allowed for longer range shooting with the shotgun. With the advent of punt guns hunters could kill dozens of birds with a single blast.

European settlers in America hunted waterfowl with great zeal, as the supply of waterfowl seemed unlimited in the Atlantic coast. As more immigrants came to the Americas in the 19th century, the need for more food became greater. Market hunting started to take form, to supply the local population living along the East Coast with fresh ducks and geese. Live ducks were used as decoys to attract other waterfowl, something that today is considered animal cruelty. During the fall migrations, the skies were filled with waterfowl. Places such as Chesapeake Bay, Delaware Bay, and Barnegat Bay were hunted extensively. In the Chesapeake Bay in the 1930s one of the biggest threats to waterfowl was local poachers using flat boats with swivel cannons that killed entire flocks with one shot.

== Species of waterfowl hunted ==
Many species of ducks and geese share the same habitat and have overlapping hunting seasons. In North America a variety of ducks and geese are hunted, the most common being mallards, Canada goose, snow goose, canvasback, redhead, northern pintail, gadwall, ruddy duck, coots, common merganser and red-breasted merganser. Also hunted are black duck, wood duck, blue-winged teal, green-winged teal, bufflehead, northern shoveler, wigeon, and goldeneye. Sea ducks include long-tailed duck, eider, and scoter.

== Modern hunting techniques ==
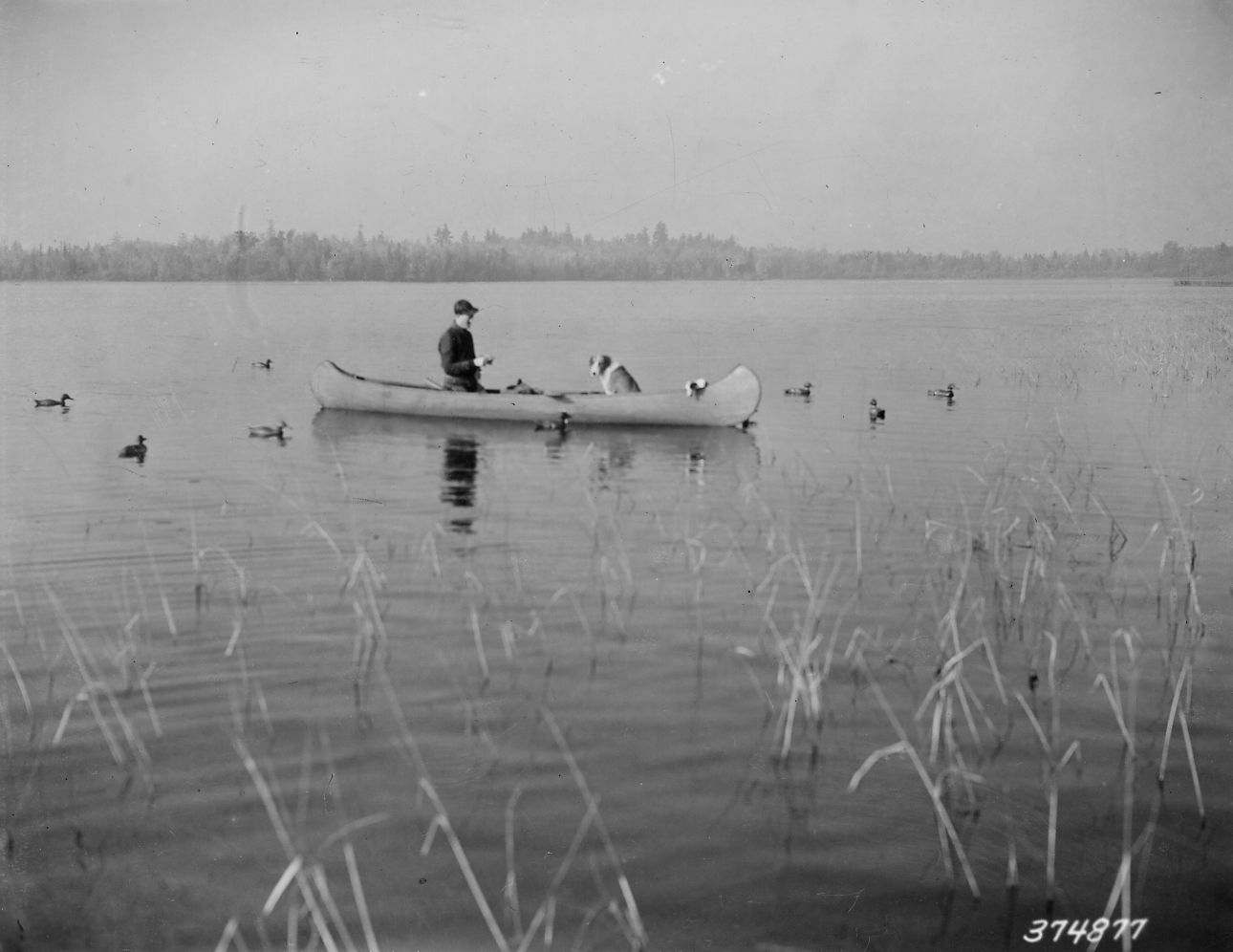
Duck hunting using decoys in the Chippewa National Forest, 1938.

The waterfowl hunting season is generally in the autumn and winter. Hunting seasons are set by the United States Fish and Wildlife Service in the United States. In the autumn, the ducks and geese have finished raising their young and are migrating to warmer areas to feed. A hunting blind is used to conceal the hunter while duck decoys are used to attract birds. Using a good spread of decoys and calling, an experienced waterfowl hunter can successfully bag ducks or geese if waterfowl are flying that day.

Boats can be used as a hunting blind, known as sneakbox. Most popular are flat-bottomed boats (usually johnboats) for increased stability. Kayaks or canoes are also used. Pursuing diving ducks in lakes, bays or sounds requires larger and more stable boats, as small boats have been known to capsize. Sinkboxes that conceal the hunter under the water surface are illegal. Retriever dogs are used to retrieve the shot ducks. Most often hunters use a Labrador Retriever, Golden Retriever or Chesapeake Bay Retriever to retrieve waterfowl. The retriever helps to retrieve birds, and hunts down crippled ducks that survived the shooting.

=== Shotguns and ammunition ===
In the late 1960s lead shot was identified as a major cause of lead poisoning of waterfowl, which feed off the bottom of lakes and wetlands. Shot pellets of lead have since been banned, and must be lead-free in the United States, Canada, and in the European Union. The pellet size depends on which species are being hunted. Buckshot is illegal. When hunting with shotguns, there is a risk of injuring birds that manage to escape, so called crippling losses. As waterfowl fly in flocks, there is a risk for multiple ducks to be hit. The duck struck by the central cluster of the shot typically dies. However, ducks on the periphery may still be hit by some pellets, which they survive but result in lifelong suffering. Shooting at too far a distance also increases the risk of crippling losses.

== Regulations and sportsmanship ==
European hunters in the Middle Ages had a deep sense of justice for their prey and saw hunting as a challenge, where the animals deserved a fair chance. Hunters used fair methods to minimize unnecessary suffering for the prey. This code of honor required hunters to actively pursue and kill all injured animals to prevent their suffering. Targeting a sitting duck was considered dishonest.

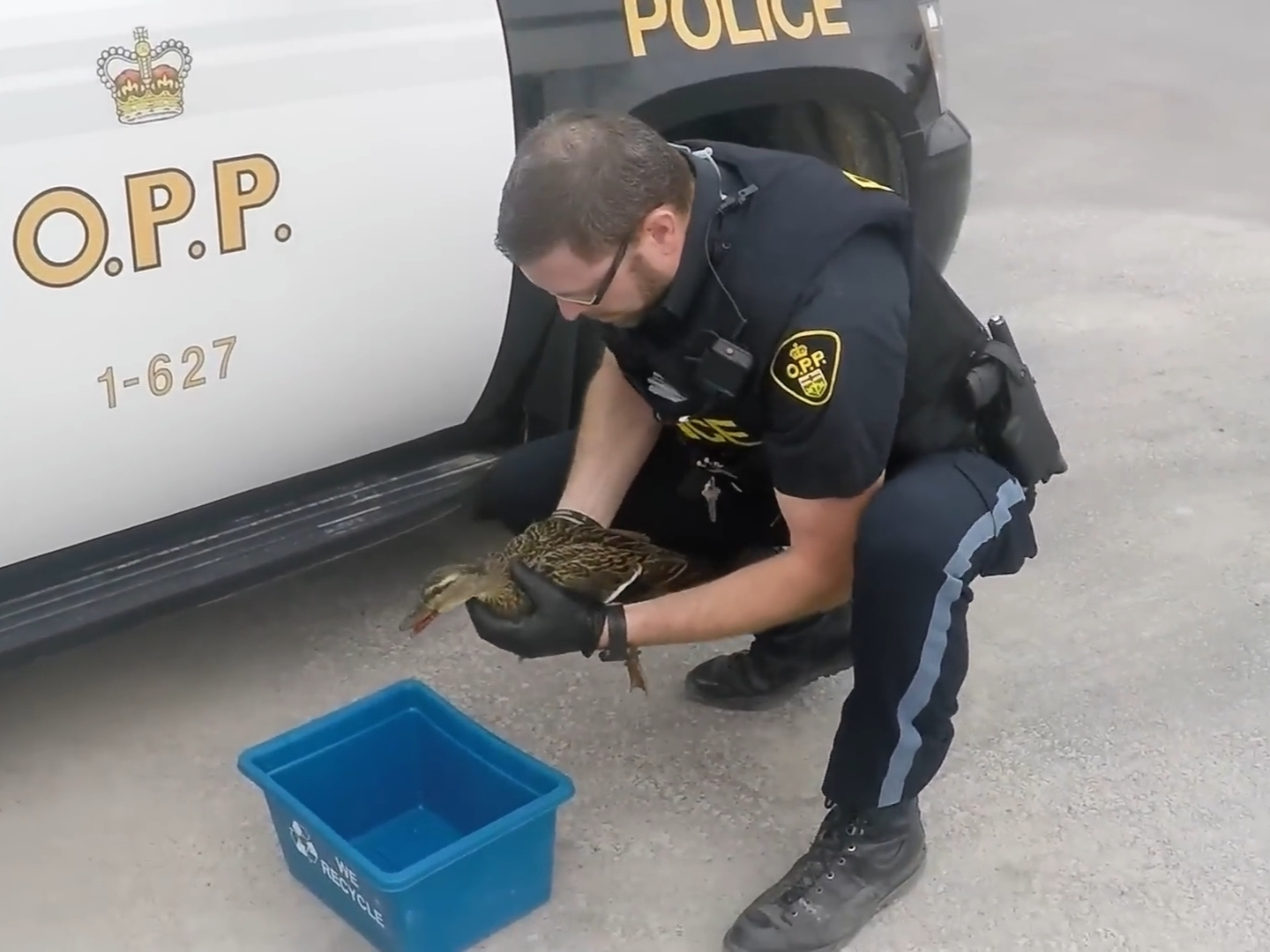
A mallard in distress gets help from the Ontario Provincial Police.

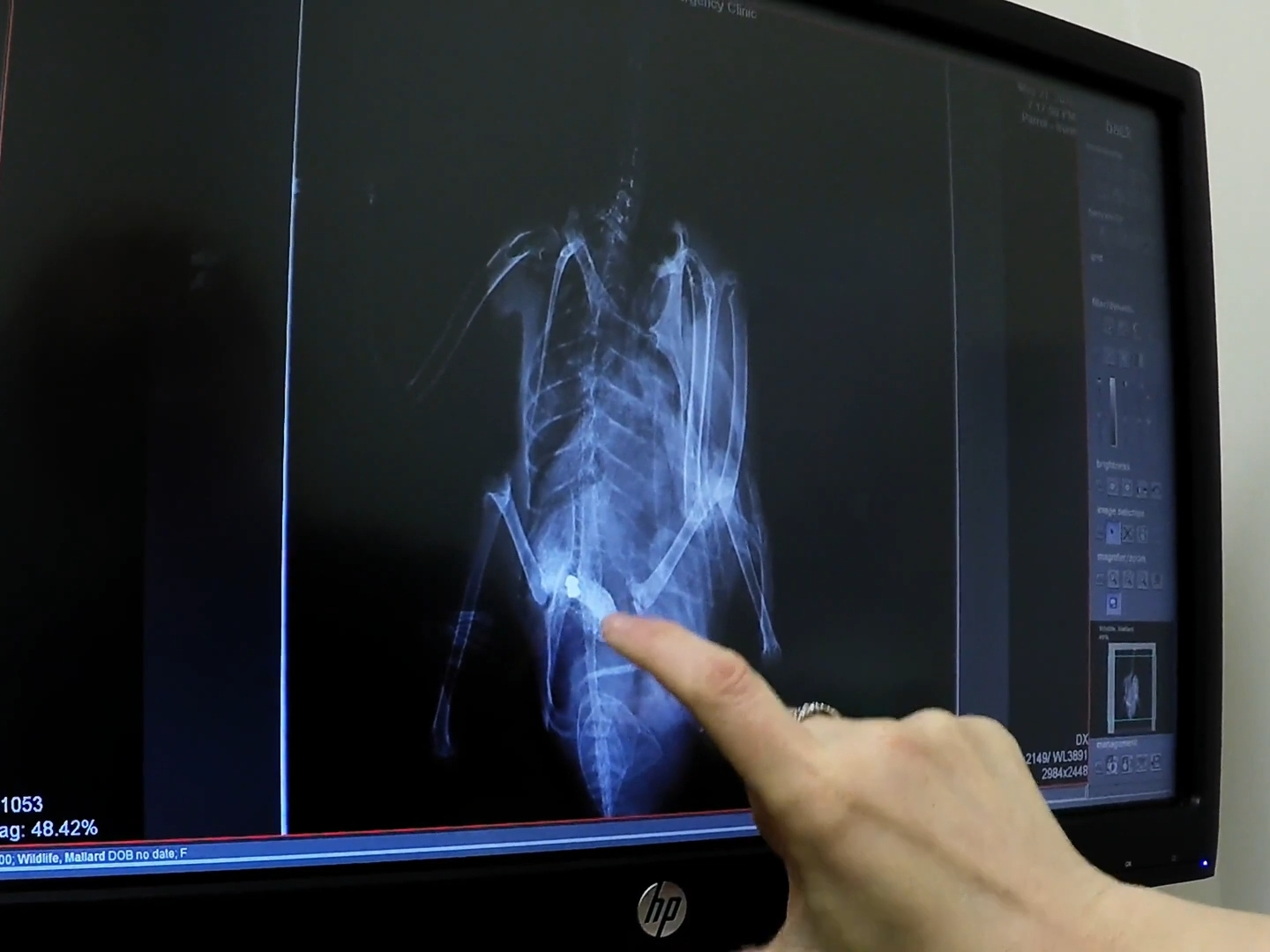
X-ray of the mallard showing shot pellets in her hip and lung injury.

To hunt waterfowl in Canada, one must first obtain a valid Canada Migratory Game Bird Hunting Permit, as well as additional licenses at the provincial level. Hunters in Canada and the United States are also required to complete safety courses before they can obtain a license. In the United States, hunters must also purchase a Federal Duck Stamp. It is illegal to shoot ducks from a motor vehicle or a moving boat. Laying baits such as corn and the use of live ducks as decoys, are also illegal.

It is considered good sportsmanship to make every possible attempt to retrieve injured or crippled waterfowl. The losses resulting from hunters not retrieving their kills, referred to as crippling losses, likely range from 20% to 40% of all waterfowl shot in Canada and the United States. The migratory bird harvest for the prairie provinces of Canada and the contiguous United States are estimated to 12 million birds annually. Thus, each year, millions of ducks and geese are crippled or injured in North America due to hunting. The probable fate for mutilated ducks is a prolonged, agonizing death, marked by relentless suffering and distress.

An X-ray study of ducks caught using nets in Australia found that between 6% and 19% of the ducks live with embedded shot pellets in their bodies. This act of animal cruelty has been mostly overlooked by government officials.

== Flyways and hunting grounds ==
Birds migrate between breeding and wintering grounds using flyways. Each flyway has a different composition of species and habitat. In the Mississippi Flyway wildfowl hunting generally occurs on lakes, marshes, swamps, or rivers where ducks and geese land during their migration. Cornfields and rice paddies are also common hunting grounds, since geese and ducks often feed on the grain that remains in the field after harvest. The Atlantic Flyway is a migration route used by waterfowl flying from northern Quebec to Florida in the autumn and back in the springtime. The habitats of waterfowl are marsh and wetlands, which are shrinking at alarming rates due to the drought and farmers draining wetland areas to plant crops. Wetland conservation and restoration is critical for the continuance of waterfowl hunting.
