= West Creek, New Jersey =

Populated place in Ocean County, New Jersey, US

- Unincorporated community
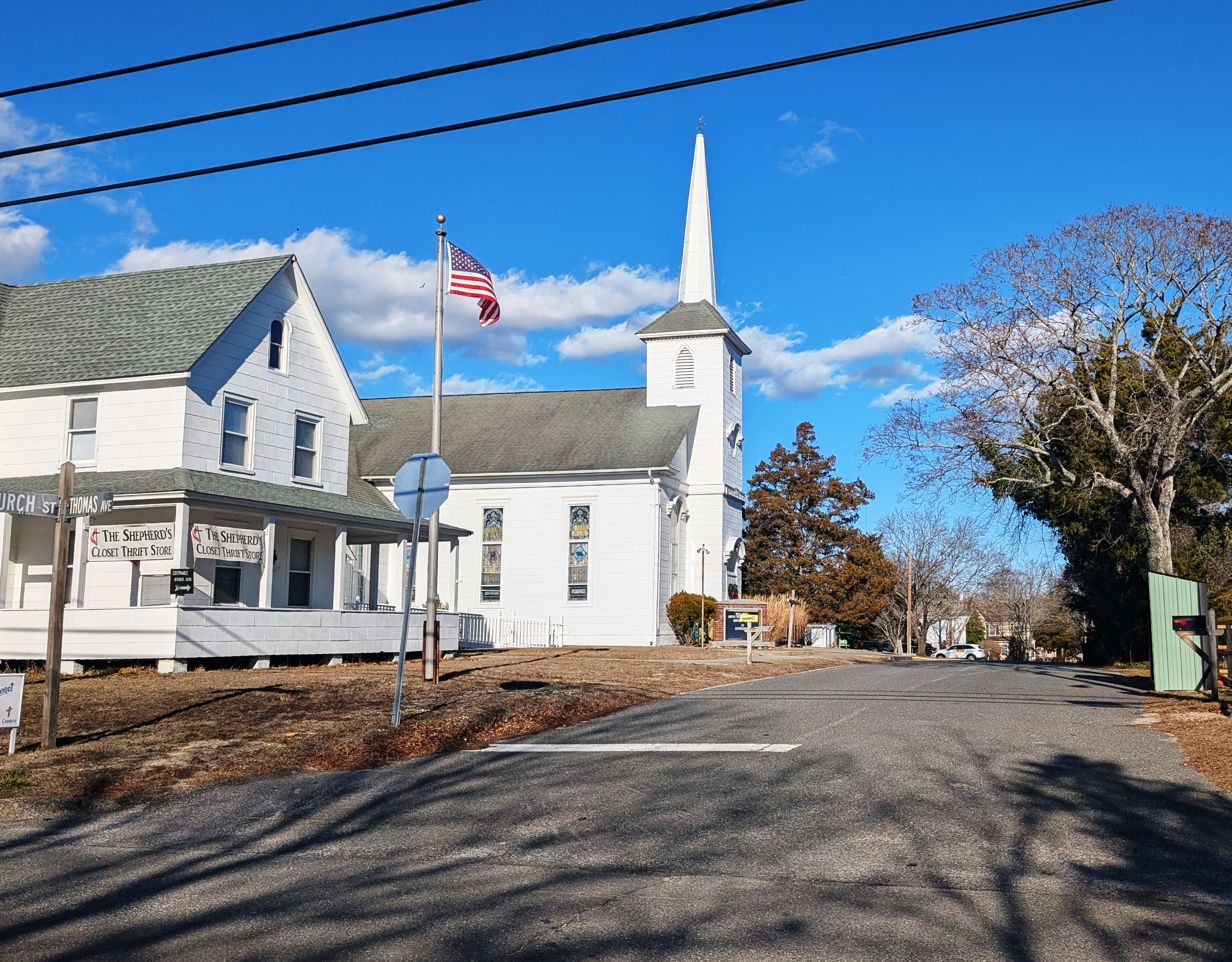
- West Creek United Methodist Church

- West Creek's location in Ocean County (Inset: Ocean County in New Jersey) West Creek, New Jersey (New Jersey) West Creek, New Jersey (the United States)
- Coordinates: 39°38′04″N 74°18′26″W
- Country: United States
- State: New Jersey
- County: Ocean
- Township: Eagleswood
- Elevation: 9.8 ft (3 m)
- ZIP Code: 08092
- GNIS feature ID: 0881694

Map of West Creek from 1878

West Creek is an unincorporated community and hamlet located within Eagleswood Township in Ocean County, in the U.S. state of New Jersey.

== History ==
The settlement is named after the stream that runs through it, Westecunk Creek. The name of the creek is derived from the Lenape word "westeconk," meaning "place of fat meat".

== Education ==
Present day schools are Eagleswood Elementary School and Pinelands Regional School District.

== Location ==
The area is served as United States Postal Service ZIP Code 08092. According to the 2020–2024 American Community Survey 5-year estimates, ZIP Code Tabulation Area (ZCTA) 08092 had a population of 3,119. The village is served by a general aviation airport, Eagles Nest Airport.

== More history ==
Captain Hazelton Seaman built and designed the first sneakbox, the "Devil's Coffin," in 1836, in West Creek, New Jersey.
