= Sneakbox =

Small boat

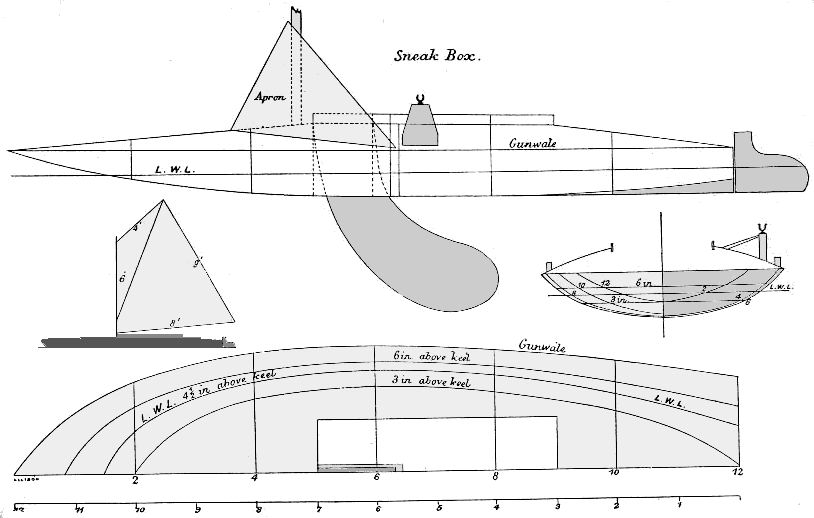
Sneakbox (1880)

A sneakbox is a small boat that can be sailed, rowed, poled or sculled. It is predominantly associated with the Barnegat Bay in New Jersey, just as the canoe-like Delaware Ducker is associated with the New Jersey marshes along the Delaware River near Philadelphia.

Railbird skiffs and garvey-like sneakboxes are other American hunting-boat types. Typically, they were all used for hunting waterfowl and marsh birds but also have been used by trappers.

== Origin ==
As with most American small craft, its origin is not well documented. It is generally accepted that Captain Hazelton Seaman invented the first sneakbox about 1836, in West Creek, New Jersey. It was usually built of Atlantic white cedar wood, known by many as Jersey cedar, which was once plentiful throughout the mid-Atlantic states.

It was conceived as a low-profile, lightweight, seaworthy hunting craft that one person could easily handle in any of the weather conditions likely to be encountered in the Jersey marshes.

The first printed description appeared in Forest and Stream on April 3, 1874, in a short letter from Robert B. White. White included a rough dimensional drawing that is recognizably a sneakbox.

== Hunting ==
Sneak boat hunting is a sub-specialty of traditional waterfowl hunting used for diver ducks which is done in a low profile canoe looking boat that is some times motorized and made of a unique designs to allow hunter to maintain a close position to the water in order to conceal them in open water and allow them to drift into rafts of ducks using the wind. Most laws allow sneak boats to be paddled to increase the speed need to reach open water rafts of ducks. These boats often have some type of fall-away concealment which the hunter drops down at the last second to improve the range of the wing shooting. This is a sport with a long history going back to market hunters and punt boats with small cannons mounted to them. Sometimes the boats are referred to as a sneakbox which seen great use on the Chesapeake Bay and the Great Lakes.

Other versions of sneak boats are called sculling boats which use a paddle protruding out of the transom of the boat allowing the hunter to lay flat while sculling the boat into rafted waterfowl.

The main focus of the sneak boat is to put the hunter very close to the decoys or rafts of live waterfowl if not directly into them for additional closer shooting. This makes for very dramatic hunting scenarios where rafting waterfowl comes extremely close to the hunter and boat.

Most sneak boats are used for diver duck or ocean duck hunting where an open deep water waterfowl species frequent. Sometimes they are deployed in marshes for more traditional puddle duck hunting or goose hunting. They are also referred to as sculling.

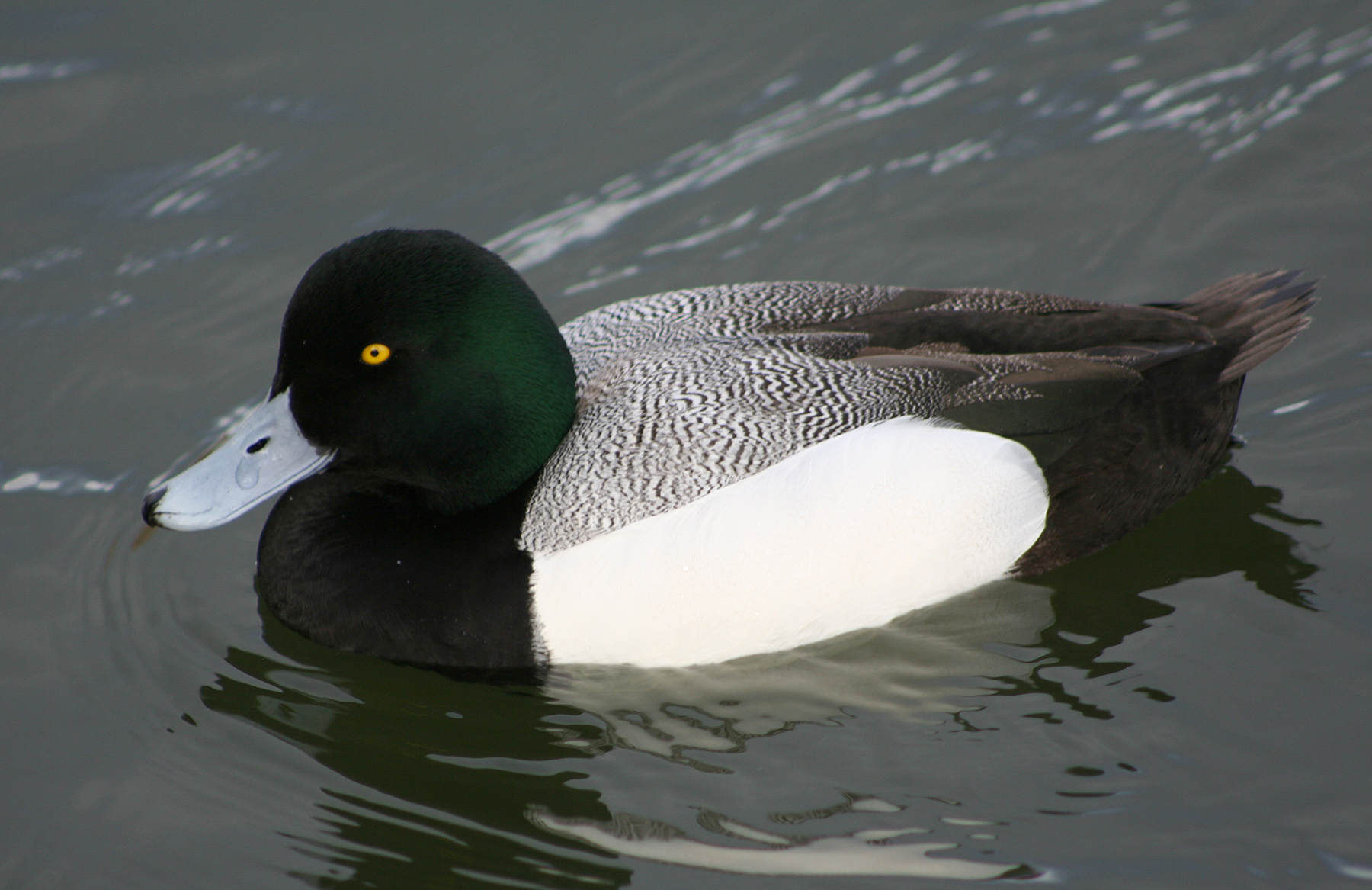
"Bluebill" scaup

Open water sneak boat hunters are known to target diver ducks such as bluebills (greater scaup), canvasback, goldeneye, scoter and eider to name a few.

These boats are known to be long and sleek to cut through the water fast and have extremely shallow drafts. Boats rang from 10 ft to upwards of 21 ft on the great lakes and rivers. They usually accompany two hunters at a time using the wind to catch a sail like blind in the front of the boat while also sculling to achieve greater speed.

Sneak boat hunters sometimes uses small spreads of decoys in open water while they lay and wait some distance away watching with binoculars. Once ducks have landed into the decoy spread the hunters begin their sneak. To waterfowl the boat is just some driftwood or breakaway marsh. Other sneak boat hunter use large cabin cruiser as a base and perform sneaks using several sneak boats and a tender boat to allow quick retrieval.

== Notable sneakbox hunters ==
=== Nathaniel Bishop ===
It was the 1879 book Four Months in a Sneak Box by Nathaniel H. Bishop that put this small boat on the map. Bishop went down the Ohio and Mississippi Rivers and eastward along the Gulf Coast into Florida in Centennial Republic, his sneakbox. It was something of a stunt in commemoration of the nation's 100th anniversary.

Nevertheless, Four Months is one of the first small-boat camp-cruising narratives published in America, where the author was not an explorer or adventurer, but simply a sportsman or boating enthusiast.

Bishop was born in Medford, Mass. He had an adventurous streak, and at 17 worked his way south from Massachusetts on a sailing ship, then hiked across South America. This is the subject of his first book (1869) The Pampas and Andes: A Thousand Miles' Walk Across South America.

By 1872 he was a canoe enthusiast along the lines of British canoeist John "Rob Roy" MacGregor. Bishop was for many years the Secretary of the American Canoe Association. He was one of the association's founders.

He ordered the 18-foot canoe Mayeta, built by J. S. Lamson, Bordentown, N.J, and started on a two-man voyage from Quebec. The voyage was abandoned because the canoe was too heavy, and Bishop apparently didn't like company.

He obtained Maria Theresa, a 58-pound paper canoe built by Elisha Waters, Troy, N.Y., and started again. Bishop rigged his canoe with rowlocks; he did use a double paddle also, which brought a lot of comments and attention from Local Boatmen. and he did not sail Maria Theresa much on his Florida cruise 1874-5, published as Voyage of the Paper Canoe in 1878.

After these three books, Bishop seems to have stopped writing except for correspondence concerning the ACA; but no one yet has attempted to create a bibliography of Bishop's later contributions to boating and sporting magazines.

=== F. Slade Dale ===
Slade Dale was a yachtsman who lived on Barnegat Bay. He was involved in the development of the racing sneakbox, but appreciated the cruising qualities of sneakboxes and had two special boats, Crab and Sheldrake, built for a Florida cruise.

In the fall of 1925, Dale and a companion took the sneakboxes, equipped with outboard motors and auxiliary sails from New York to Florida. By Sneakbox to Florida appeared in Yachting in 1927. These were more like the working sneakbox than the racing boat, and as the photo shows, were designed to be fully enclosed with hatches if necessary. Dale's Sneakbox Sheldrake is displayed at the Toms River Maritime Museum.

== Types ==
=== Cruising sneakboxes ===
After Bishop rowed (he hardly used his sail) down the Ohio and Mississippi Rivers in 1876, the boating press took notice and people began to develop sailing sneakboxes as an alternative for solo cruising to the sailing canoe.

Bishop writes about early sneakboxes in Four Months:

This remarkable little boat has a history which does not reach very far back into the present century. With the assistance of Mr. William Errickson of Barnegat, and Dr. William P. Haywood of West Creek, Ocean County, New Jersey, I have been able to rescue from oblivion and bring to the light of day a correct history of the Barnegat sneak-box.

Captain Hazelton Seaman, of West Creek village, New Jersey, a boat-builder and an expert shooter of wild-fowl, about the year 1836, conceived the idea of constructing for his own use a low-decked boat, or gunning-punt, in which, when its deck was covered with sedge, he could secrete himself from the wild-fowl while gunning in Barnegat and Little Egg Harbor bays.

It was important that the boat should be sufficiently light to enable a single sportsman to pull her from the water on to the low points of the bay shores. During the winter months, when the great marshes were at times incrusted with snow, and the shallow creeks covered with ice,--obstacles which must be crossed to reach the open waters of the sound,--it would be necessary to use her as a sled, to effect which end a pair of light oaken strips were screwed to the bottom of the sneak-box, when she could be easily pushed by the gunner, and the transportation of the oars, sail, blankets, guns, ammunition, and provisions (all of which stowed under the hatch and locked up as snugly as if in a strong chest) became a very simple matter. While secreted in his boat, on the watch for fowl, with his craft hidden by a covering of grass or sedge, the gunner could approach within shooting-distance of a flock of unsuspicious ducks; and this being done in a sneaking manner (though Mr. Seaman named the result of his first effort the "Devil's Coffin" the bay-men gave her the sobriquet of "SNEAK-BOX"; and this name she has retained to the present day).

Since Captain Seaman built his "Devil's Coffin," forty years ago, the model has been improved by various builders, until it is believed that it has almost attained perfection. The boat has no sheer, and sets low in the water. This lack of sheer is supplied by a light canvas apron which is tacked to the deck, and presents, when stretched upward by a stick two feet long, a convex surface to a head sea. The water which breaks upon the deck, forward of the cockpit, is turned off at the sides of the boat in almost the same manner as a snow-plough clears a railroad track of snow. The apron also protects the head and shoulders of the rower from cold head winds.

The first sneak-box built by Captain Seaman had a piece of canvas stretched upon an oaken hoop, so fastened to the deck that when a head sea struck the bow, the hoop and canvas were forced upward so as to throw the water off its sides, thus effectually preventing its ingress into the hold of the craft. The improved apron originated with Mr. John Crammer, Jr., a short time after Captain Seaman built the first sneak-box. The second sneak-box was constructed by Mr. Crammer; and afterwards Mr. Samuel Perine, an old and much respected bay-man, of Barnegat, built the third one. The last two men have finished their voyage of life, but "Uncle Haze,"--as he is familiarly called by his many admirers,--the originator of the tiny craft which may well be called multum in parvo, and which carried me, its single occupant, safely and comfortably twenty-six hundred miles, from Pittsburgh to Cedar Keys, still lives at West Creek, builds yachts as well as he does sneak-boxes, and puts to the blush younger gunners by the energy displayed and success attained in the vigorous pursuit of wildfowl shooting in the bays which fringe the coast of Ocean County, New Jersey.

A few years since, this ingenious man invented an improvement on the marine life-saving car, which has been adopted by the United States government; and during the year 1875 he constructed a new ducking-punt with a low paddle-wheel at its stern, for the purpose of more easily and secretly approaching flocks of wild-fowl.

The peculiar advantages of the sneak-box were known to but few of the hunting and shooting fraternity, and, with the exception of an occasional visitor, were used only by the oystermen, fishermen, and wild-fowl shooters of Barnegat and Little Egg Harbor bays, until the New Jersey Southern Railroad and its connecting branches penetrated to the eastern shores of New Jersey, when educated amateur sportsmen from the cities quickly recognized in the little gunning-punt all they had long desired to combine in one small boat.

Mr. Charles Hallock, in his paper the "Forest and Stream," of April 23, 1874, gave drawings and a description of the sneak-box, and fairly presented its claims to public favor.

The sneak-box is not a monopoly of any particular builder, but it requires peculiar talent to build one,--the kind of talent which enables one man to cut out a perfect axe-handle, while the master-carpenter finds it difficult to accomplish the same thing. The best yacht-builders in Ocean County generally fail in modelling a sneak-box, while many second-rate mechanics along the shore, who could not possibly construct a yacht that would sail well, can make a perfect sneak-box, or gunning-skiff. All this may be accounted for by recognizing the fact that the water-lines of the sneak-box are peculiar, and differ materially from those of row-boats, sailboats, and yachts. Having a spoon-shaped bottom and bow, the sneak-box moves rather over the water than through it, and this peculiarity, together with its broad beam, gives the boat such stiffness that two persons may stand upright in her while she is moving through the water, and troll their lines while fishing, or discharge their guns, without careening the boat; a valuable advantage not possessed by our best cruising canoes.

The boat sails well on the wind, though hard to pull against a strong head sea. A fin-shaped centre-board takes the place of a keel. It can be quickly removed from the trunk, or centre-board well, and stored under the deck. The flatness of her floor permits the sneak-box to run in very shallow water while being rowed or when sailing before the wind without the centre-board. Some of these boats, carrying a weight of three hundred pounds, will float in four to six inches of water.

The favorite material for boat-building in the United States is white cedar (Cupressus thyoides), which grows in dense forests in the swamps along the coast of New Jersey, as well as in other parts of North America. The wood is both white and brown, soft, fine-grained, and very light and durable. No wood used in boat-building can compare with the white cedar in resisting the changes from a wet to a dry state, and vice versa. The tree grows tall and straight. The lower part of the trunk with the diverging roots furnish knee timbers and carlines for the sneak-box. The ribs or timbers, and the carlines, are usually 1 1/4 × 1 1/4 inches in dimension, and are placed about ten inches apart. The frame above and below is covered with half-inch cedar sheathing, which is not less than six inches wide. The boat is strong enough to support a heavy man upon its deck, and when well built will rank next to the seamless paper boats of Mr. Waters of Troy, and the seamless wooden canoes of Messrs. Herald, Gordon & Stephenson, of the province of Ontario, Canada, in freedom from leakage.

During a cruise of twenty-six hundred miles not one drop of water leaked through the seams of the Centennial Republic. Her under planking was nicely joined, and the seams calked with cotton wicking, and afterwards filled with white-lead paint and putty. The deck planks, of seven inches width, were not joined, but were tongued and grooved, the tongues and grooves being well covered with a thick coat of white-lead paint.

The item of cost is another thing to be considered in regard to this boat. The usual cost of a first-class canoe of seventy pounds' weight, built after the model of the Rob Roy or Nautilus, with all its belongings, is about one hundred and twenty-five dollars; and these figures deter many a young man from enjoying the ennobling and healthful exercise of canoeing. A first-class sneak-box, with spars, sail, oars, anchor, &c., can be obtained for seventy-five dollars, and if several were ordered by a club they could probably be bought for sixty-five dollars each. The price of a sneak-box, as ordinarily built in Ocean County, New Jersey, is about forty dollars. The Centennial Republic cost about seventy-five dollars, and a city boat-builder would not duplicate her for less than one hundred and twenty-five dollars. The builders of the sneak-boxes have not yet acquired the art of overcharging their customers; they do not expect to receive more than one dollar and fifty cents or two dollars per day for their labor; and some of them are even so unwise as to risk their reputation by offering to furnish these boats for twenty-five dollars each. Such a craft, after a little hard usage, would leak as badly as most cedar canoes, and would be totally unfit for the trials of a long cruise.

The diagram given of the Centennial Republic will enable the reader of aquatic proclivities to understand the general principles upon which these boats are built. As they should be rated as third-class freight on railroads, it is more economical for the amateur to purchase a first-class boat at Barnegat, Manahawken, or West Creek, in Ocean County, New Jersey, along the Tuckerton Railroad, than to have a workman elsewhere, and one unacquainted with this peculiar model, experiment upon its construction at the purchaser's cost, and perhaps loss.

One bright morning, in the early part of the fall of 1875, I trudged on foot down one of the level roads which lead from the village of Manahawken through the swamps to the edge of the extensive salt marshes that fringe the shores of the bay. This road bore the euphonious name of Eel Street,—so named by the boys of the town. When about half-way from its end, I turned off to the right, and followed a wooded lane to the house of an honest surf-man, Captain George Bogart, who had recently left his old home on the beach, beside the restless waves of the Atlantic, and had resumed his avocation as a sneak-box builder.

=== Working Sneakboxes ===
External images
- Views of a working sneakbox from the Ocean County (N.J.) Cultural and Heritage Commission
- Hunter with gear, rowing
- A sneakbox in a flood

Meanwhile, hunters continued to use the classic sneakbox. Eventually, among the many builders in the Jersey marshes, J. Howard Perrine of Perrine Boat Works became the most noted builder. Perrine's father Samuel was one of the pioneer sneakbox builders.

=== Racing Sneakboxes ===
As time passed, the yachting fraternity based a racing boat on the working sneakbox by scaling it up, making it longer and beamier. This larger sneakbox had much more sail than a working sneakbox.

== See also ==
- Punt gun
