= Eagles Nest Airport (New Jersey) =

- IATA: none; ICAO: none; FAA LID: 31E

Summary
- Airport type: Privately owned, public-use
- Owner: Peter Weidhorn
- Location: West Creek, New Jersey
- Elevation AMSL: 35 ft (11 m)
- Coordinates: 39°39′55.4″N 74°18′28.5″W
- Website: eaglesnestairport.com

Map
- Interactive map of Eagles Nest Airport

Runways
Direction	Length		Surface
Direction	ft	m	Surface
14/32	3,200	975	Asphalt

Statistics (2010)
- Aircraft operations: 500
- Based aircraft: 2
- Source: Federal Aviation Administration

Eagles Nest Airport (FAA LID: 31E) is a privately owned public-use airport serving general aviation aircraft. It was upgraded in April 1989, but had been in operation since the 1960s. It is located two nautical miles (3.704 km) north of the community of West Creek, in Eagleswood Township, New Jersey.

An accident occurred there in June 2017 involving a skydiving aircraft crashing into the woods short of the runway. The 1966 Cessna C206's owner was George Voishnis, also a co-owner of Skydive East Coast.

An accident in May 2017 involved a general aviation aircraft crashing into the leafy residential neighborhood of Laurel Hill Lane less than a mile from the runway. The airplane was substantially damaged, and it narrowly missed hitting two homes, crashing nose first into landscaping straddling two residential front lawns.

On 19 July 2017 an aircraft headed towards Eagles Nest made a successful emergency landing on Sunrise Highway in Yaphank near exit 57.

Two tandem skydivers jumping with Skydive East Coast were seriously injured at the airport in May 2016 when their parachute collapsed. The professional skydiver and a first-time jumper were airlifted to the hospital.

A skydiving airplane operating for Skydive East Coast and flying out of the airport lost power and crash landed on a 4-lane highway, route 72, in Manahawkin, NJ in July 2015, barely missing several cars on the roadway, which is a busy access road to the popular beaches of Long Beach Island.

An accident occurred there in May 2008 involving a general aviation craft crash landing into the woods a few hundred feet way from the runway. Nearby residents witnessed the accident. Two people, including the pilot, were killed. One of the survivors sued the state, the pilot's estate, and her employer; the lawsuits were settled in 2013.

Peter J. Weidhorn of Tenafly, NJ, who had pursued a number expansions of the airport, purchased it. The sale concerned many local residents who live close to the end of the runway of what was until then a sleepy local airport.

== Gallery ==
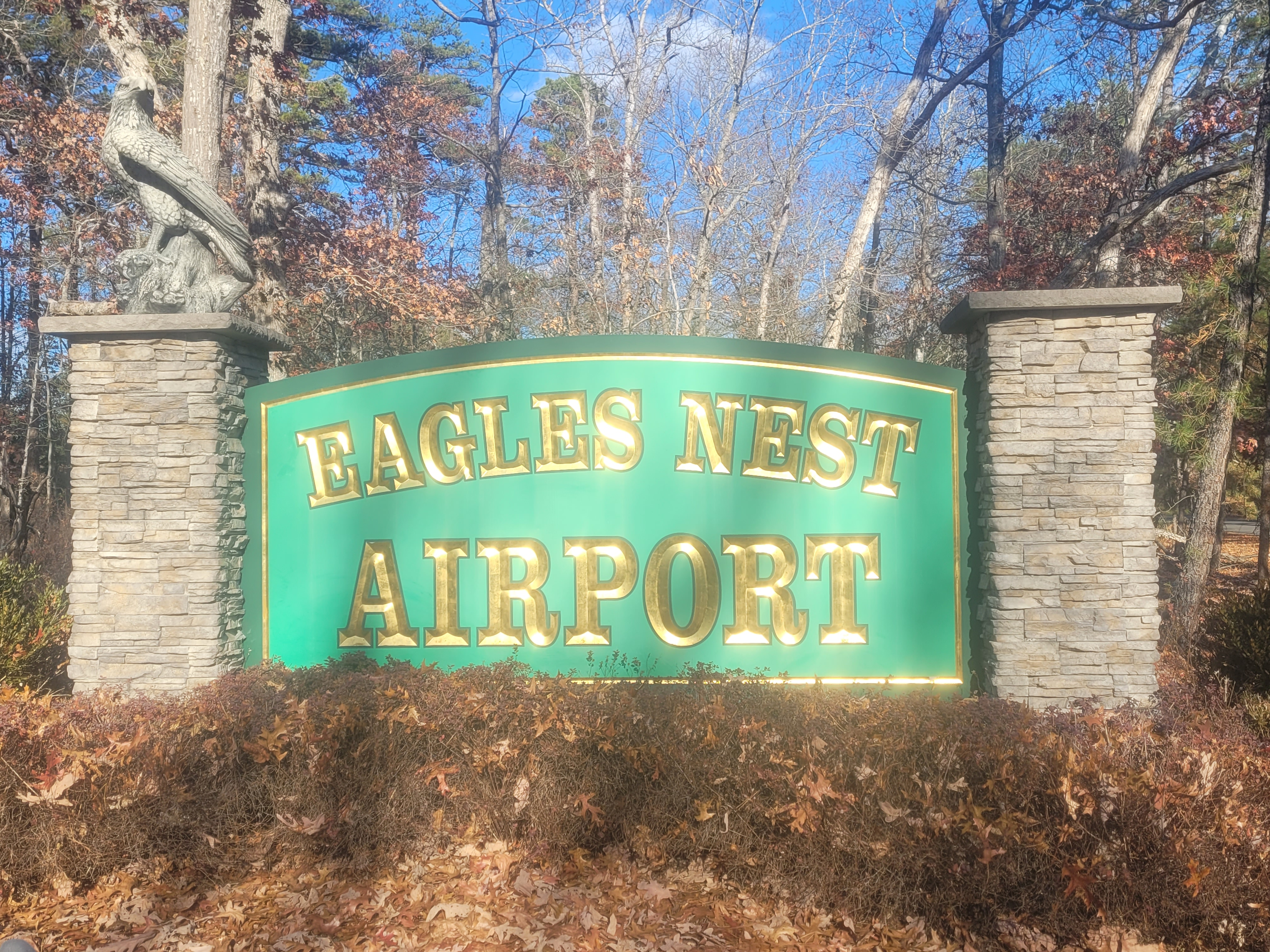
Exterior sign

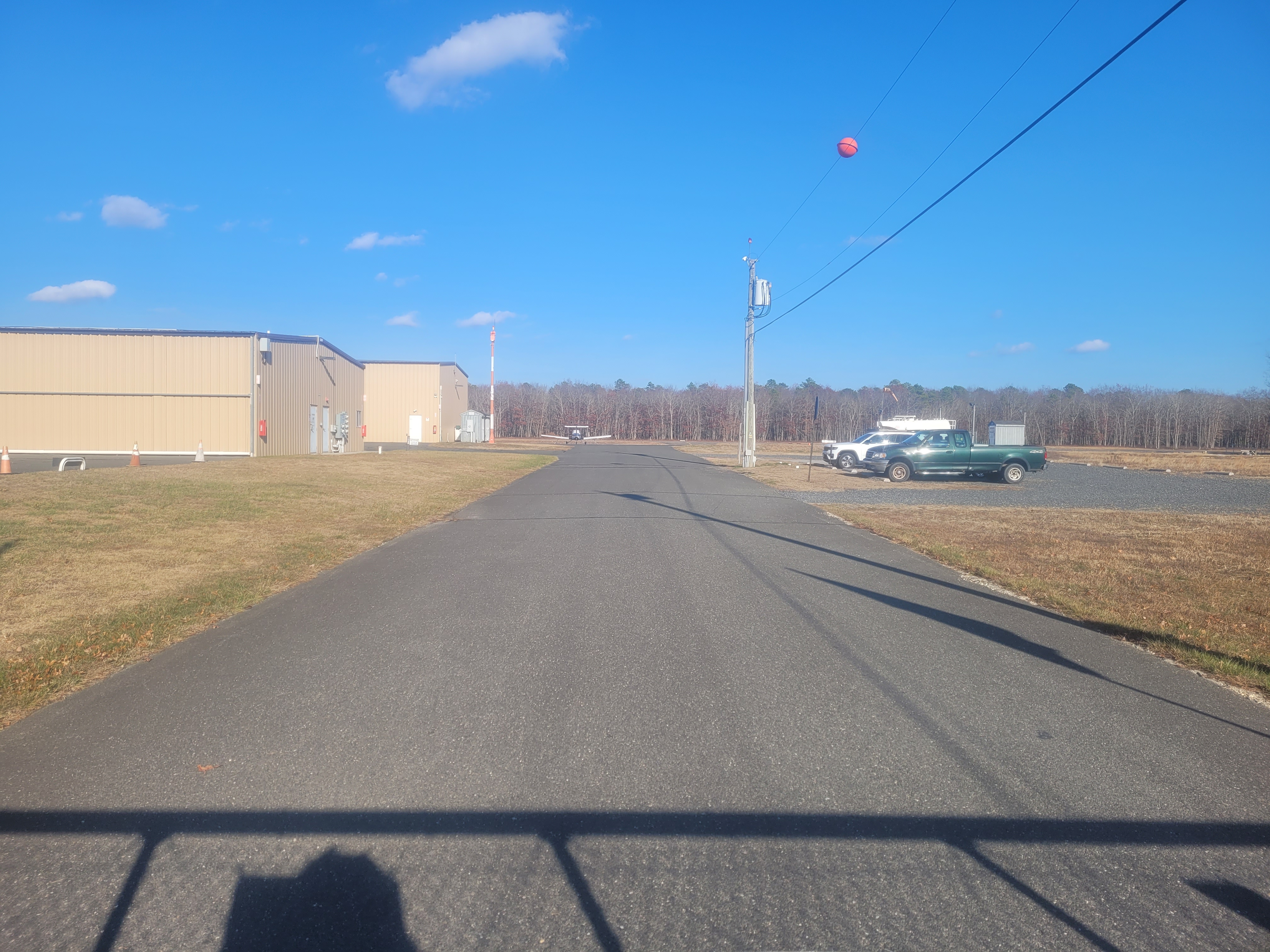
Eagles Nest Airport, in November 2024
