= Hunting blind =

Cover device for hunters or gamekeepers

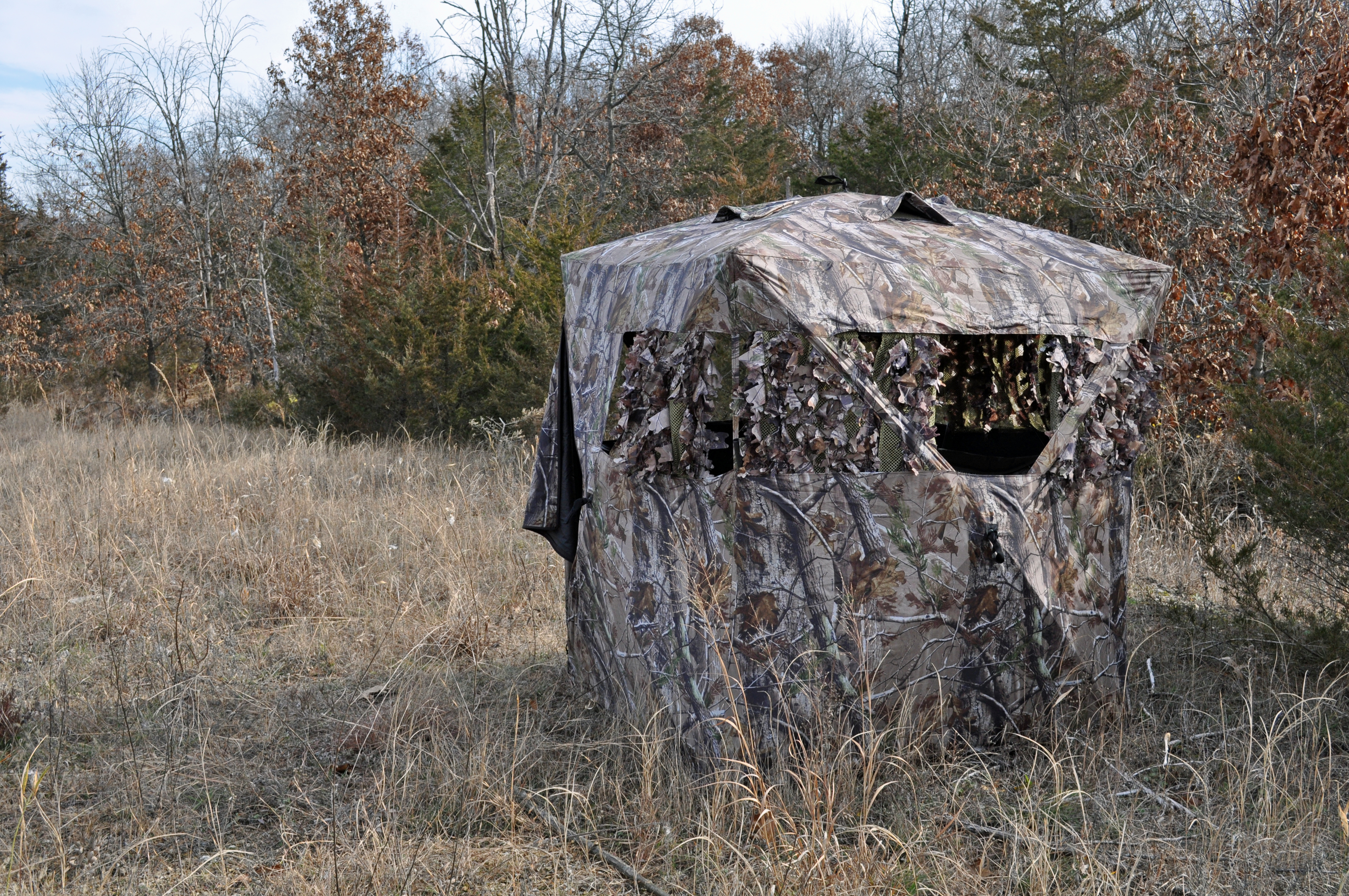
A pop-up pack-in style blind

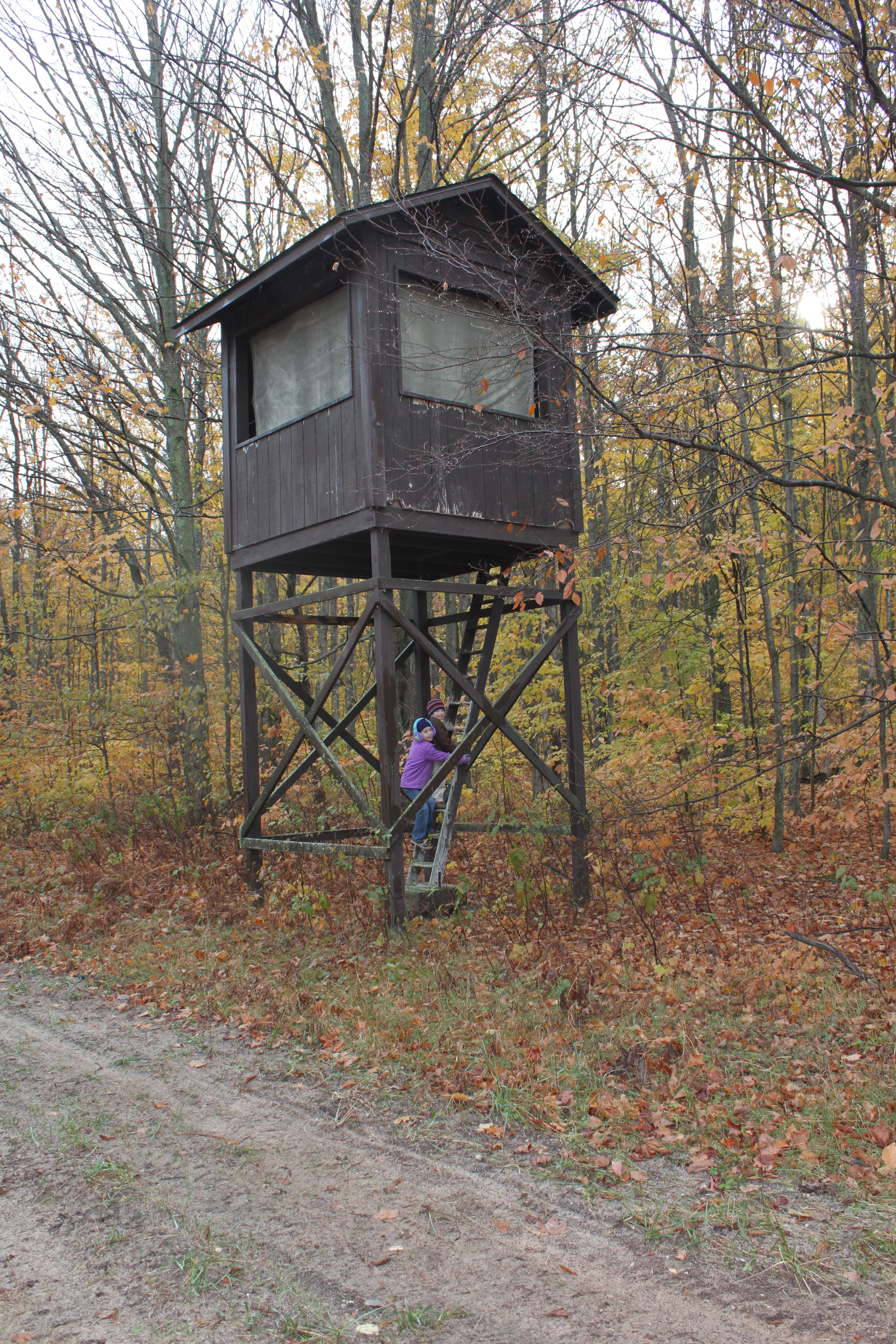
A large elevated hunting blind in Michigan

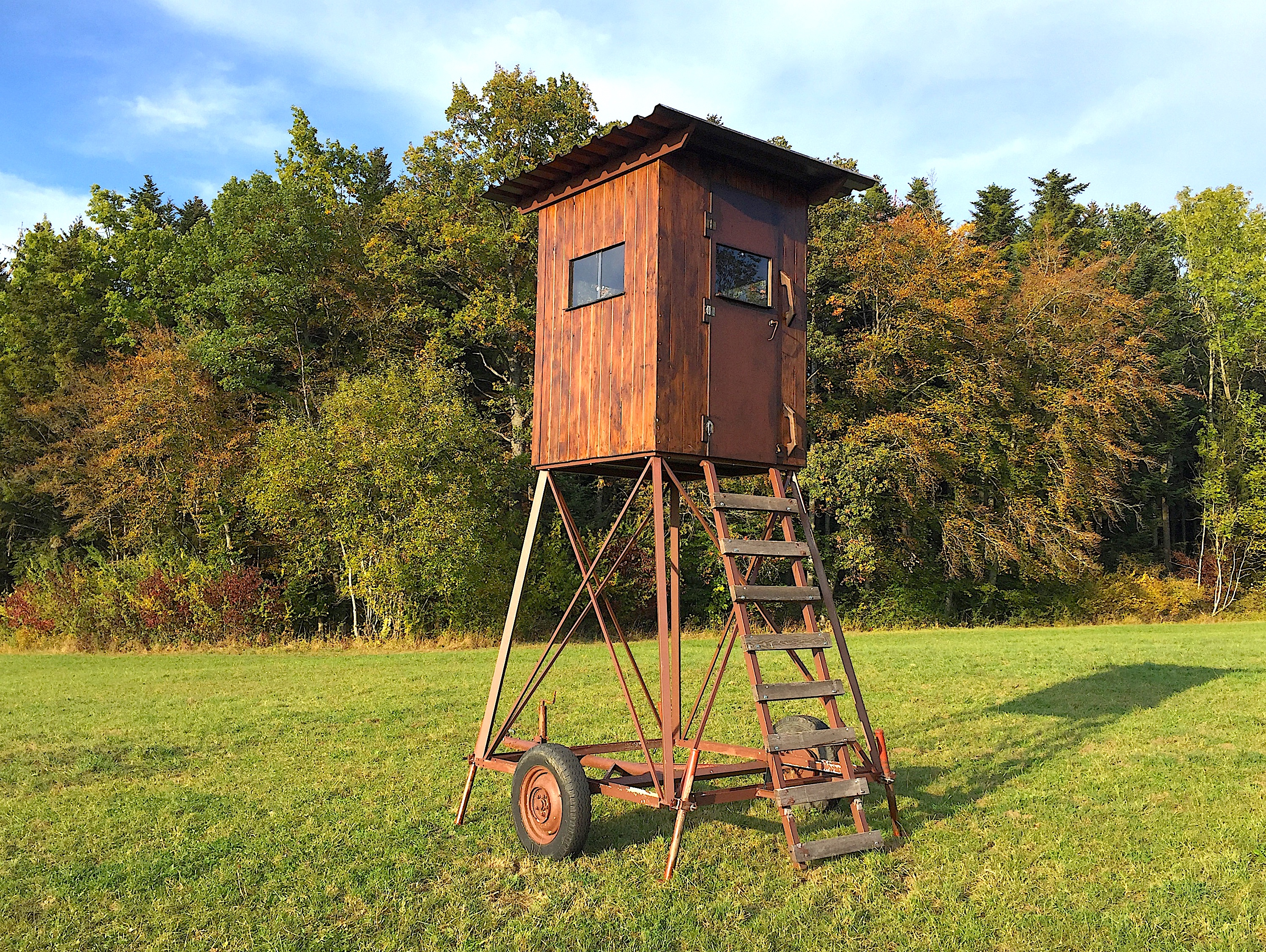
Mobile hunting blind

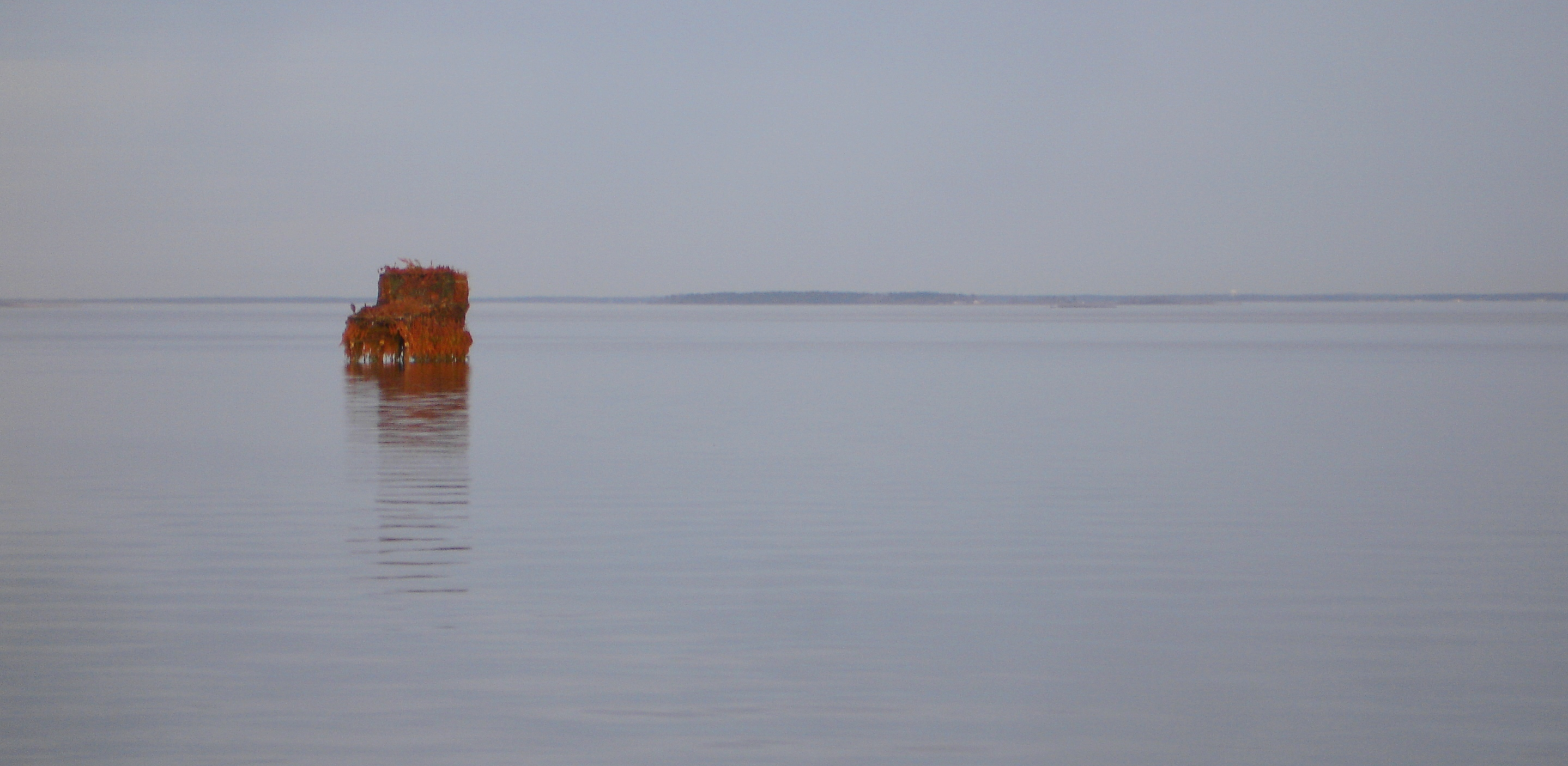
A duck blind on the Chesapeake Bay

A hunting blind (US), hide or machan is a concealment device or shelter used by hunters and gamekeepers to reduce the chance of detection by animals. There are different types of hunting blinds for different situations; some are exceedingly simple in design, while others are complex structures. The legality of different hunting blinds may vary according to season, game species and local law.

== Types ==
Blinds may be stable or mobile. An early blind used by hunters was a cocking-cloth, a piece of canvas stretched on a frame like a kite that would permit hunters to approach pheasants and to shoot them through a hole in the cloth.

Ground blinds are an alternative to the traditional tree stand; movements in a well-designed ground blind can virtually be undetectable by the game.

Duck blinds in the grain fields in south central Oregon and north central California can be as simple as a hunter walking three to five kilometres (2–3 mi) out into a grain field, stopping at a dike, a raised area, 60 cm (2 ft) or so high, 3–3.6 m (10–12 ft) wide and usually 800 m (1/2 mi) or so long on a side. The hunter sits down on the top and pushes dirt away with both feet, front and back. In two to three minutes a shallow depression is created. Then additional stubble from cut grain can be placed around the edges, enough to provide cover when the hunter lies down when birds are spotted, sitting up when they come in range. The blind can be deepened to allow sitting upright, if desired, by using a digging tool. In other areas duck blinds can be quite elaborate. More substantial structures are common in the midwestern United States, and their purpose often extends beyond concealment to include protection from the elements, particularly from rain and cold. In some areas, blinds can approach small cabins in their size and amenities. A sinkbox is another elaborate form of duck blind, designed for partial submersion in a body of water; sinkboxes are illegal to use in the United States. Also for hunting waterfowl in fields, hunters will use a layout blind. A layout blind is a low profile blind that a person can lie down in and stubble in to hide from waterfowl.

The tallest hunting blind is near Bad Schwanberg, Austria at 46.794331 N 15.050712 E. It has a height of 29 metres .
