= Punt gun =

Extremely large shotgun for harvesting waterfowl

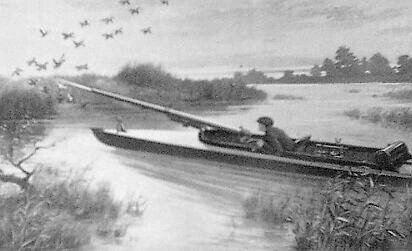
- A punt gun as illustrated in Science and Mechanics magazine in October 1911
- Type: Shotgun, Hunting

A punt gun is a type of extremely large shotgun used in the 19th and early 20th centuries for shooting large numbers of waterfowl for commercial harvesting operations. These weapons are characteristically too large for an individual to fire from the shoulder or often carry alone, but unlike artillery pieces, punt guns are able to be aimed and fired by a single person from a mount. In this case, the mount is typically a small watercraft (e.g., a punt). Many early models appear similar to over-sized versions of shoulder weapons of the time with full-length wooden stocks with a normal-sized shoulder stock. Most later variations do away with the full-length stock – especially more modern models – and have mounting hardware fixed to the gun to allow them to be fitted to a pintle.

== Operation and usage ==
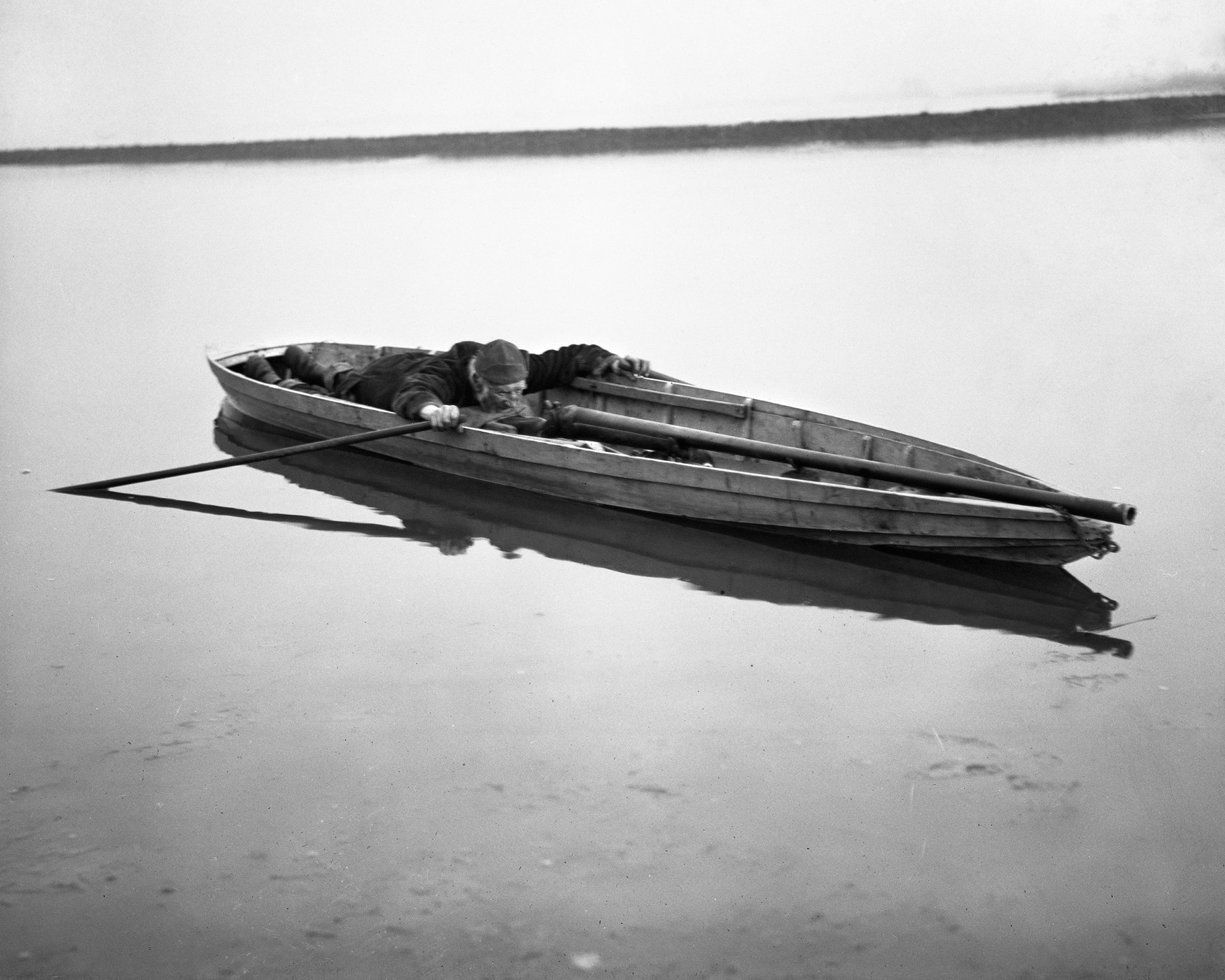
Sighting a punt gun

Punt guns were usually custom-designed and varied widely, but could have bore diameters exceeding 2 inches (51 mm) and fire over a pound (≈ 0.45 kg) of shot at a time.

With an effective range of about 50 yards (46 meters) a single shot could kill over 50 waterfowl resting on the water's surface.

They were too big to hold and the recoil was so large that they had to be mounted directly on punts used for hunting, hence their name.

Hunters would maneuver their punts quietly into line and range of the flock using poles or oars to avoid startling them. Generally, the gun was fixed to the punt; thus the hunter would manoeuvre the entire boat in order to aim the gun. The guns were sufficiently powerful, and the punts sufficiently small, that firing the gun often propelled the punt backwards several inches or more. The powerful recoil of punt guns frequently caused injury to the hunter who lay behind the gun to discharge the weapon; broken teeth and powder burns to the face were not uncommon. To improve efficiency, hunters could work in fleets of up to around ten punts.

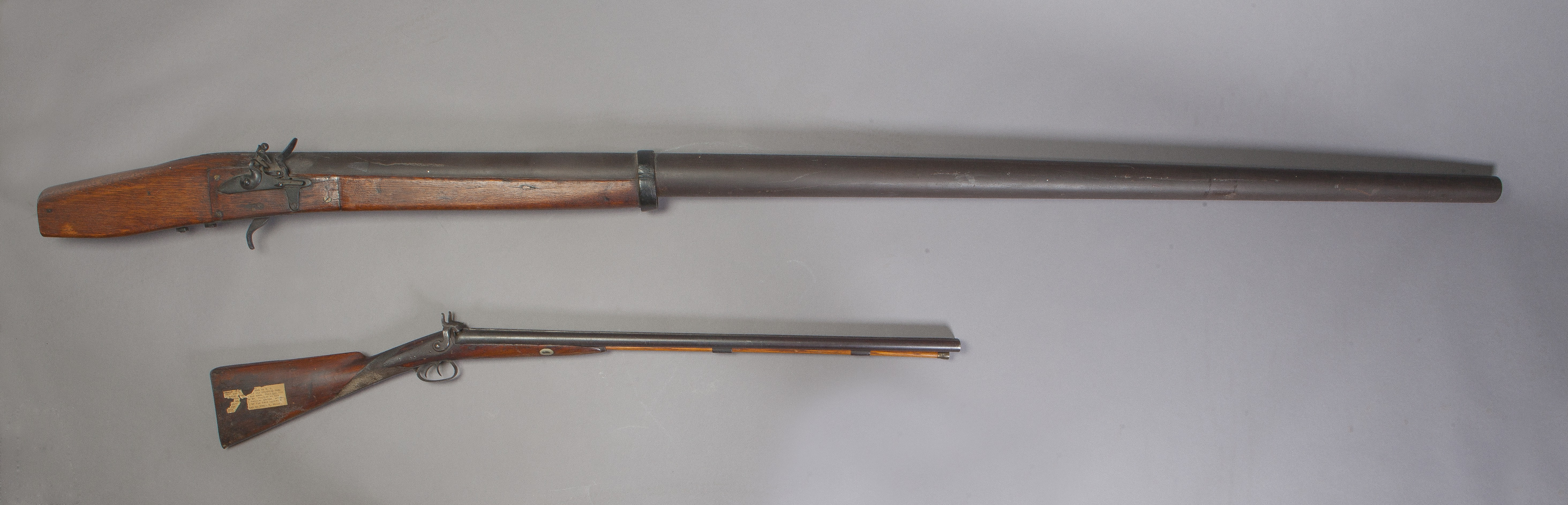
Flintlock punt gun compared to a standard muzzleloading rifle

Punt guns are usually muzzle-loaded with a lock similar to muskets or rifles of the day including flintlock, percussion, and more modern types.

Holland & Holland offered models using breech loading and standardized shotgun shells in both brass and combined paper and brass base in the 1890s via custom order. Double-barrelled models also existed, typically in the smaller 8-gauge loadings. In most cases, these guns were work-guns with little additional adornment in surviving examples. Many appearing in modern auctions have signs of being repaired or upgraded in some fashion, such as upgrading a flintlock action to a more modern percussion system or refinishing by rebluing the piece.

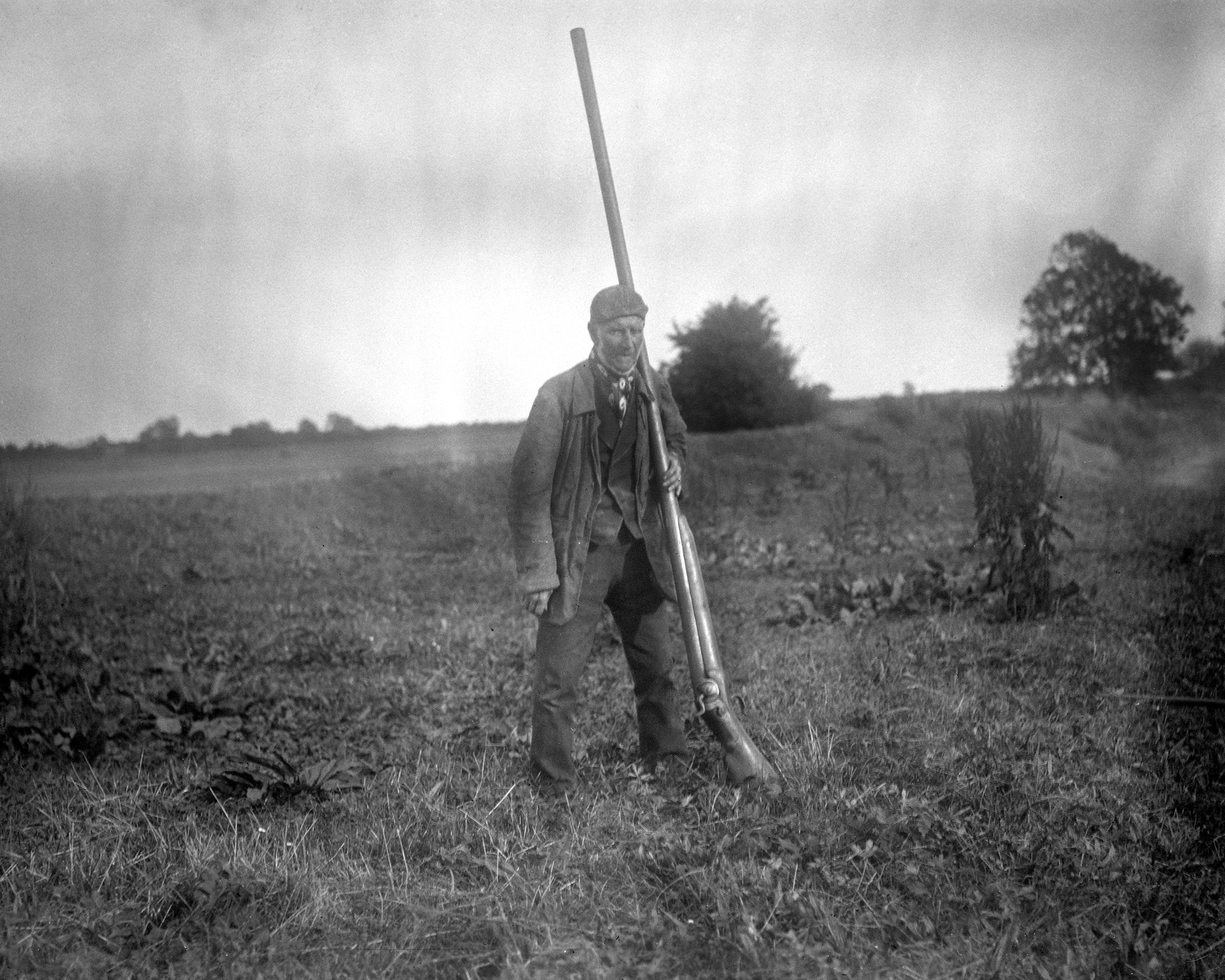
Size comparison of a man and punt gun

In the United States, this practice depleted stocks of wild waterfowl and by the 1860s most states had banned the practice. The Lacey Act of 1900 banned the transport of wild game across state lines, and the practice of market hunting was outlawed by a series of federal laws in 1918. While use and possession of punt guns is still legal in the United States, Federal regulations prohibit their use in migratory waterfowl hunting.

According to Eunan O'Halpin's book Defending Ireland, a Local Defence Force unit of the Irish Army in Co. Louth was equipped in 1941 with a number of flintlock weapons that had been given to them. Among these guns was a weapon described as being a "nine-foot (9 feet (2.7 m)) [long] blunderbuss", which could be more commonly understood to be a punt gun.

In the United Kingdom, a 1995 survey showed fewer than 50 active punt guns still in use. The Wildlife and Countryside Act 1981 limits punt guns in England and Wales, and in Scotland, to a bore diameter of 1.75 inches (44 mm) that fired a load of projectiles weighing 1.125 pounds (510 g). Since Queen Victoria's Diamond Jubilee in 1897 there has been a punt gun salute every Coronation and Jubilee over Cowbit Wash in Cowbit, Lincolnshire, England. During the Diamond Jubilee of Elizabeth II, 21 punt gun rounds were fired separately, followed by the guns all being fired simultaneously.

== Punt gun bans and enforcement on the Chesapeake Bay ==
Not until the late 19th century were efforts made to restrict the use of punt guns and other market hunting devices on the Chesapeake Bay. State and county legislation was prompted by a decline in waterfowl stocks and the rise of shooting clubs that attracted wealthy recreational hunting enthusiasts. In 1872 Virginia banned punt guns, but enforcement by local sheriffs, game wardens, and judges was lax.

In 1882, Maryland legislators, under pressure from the sport hunting lobby, passed a sweeping ban on night hunting and all forms of improvised subsistence or “pot hunting” devices: punt guns, swivel guns, and sinkboxes. The law imposed a $300 fine on violators, and authorities were empowered to take the accused to outside jurisdictions for prosecution.

=== Sting operation on Spesutie Island, 1882 ===
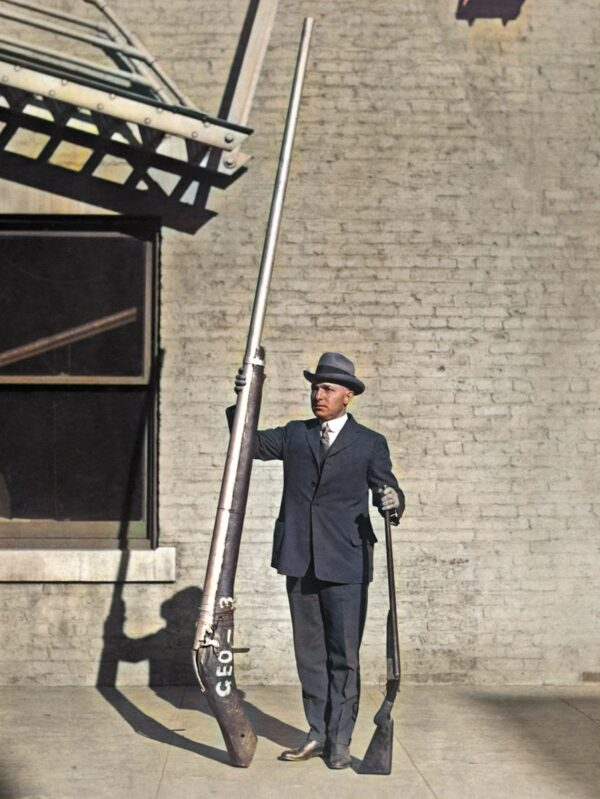
George Lawyer, chief game warden for the Bureau of Biological Survey exhibiting a punt gun confiscated from the Chesapeake Bay.

Despite legal efforts to stop the practice, night hunting with punt and swivel guns continued largely unrestrained on the upper Chesapeake Bay south of Harve de Grace in the 1880s. Local sport hunting clubs and bayside property owners attributed the decline in waterfowl populations to these unregulated commercial hunting practices and determined to suppress them.

Particularly offensive to exclusive gun clubs were the “Spesutie Island gang,” local hunters who reportedly cruised the ducking grounds during the day, infuriating sport hunters by scaring off flocks of waterfowl, then returning at night to poach the birds with punt guns. The suspected ringleader of the gang was George Washington “Uncle Wash” Barnes, a prosperous and politically well-connected commercial fisherman who moonlighted in marketing the poached ducks. Members of the Carroll’s Island Ducking Club and the wealthy business establishment engaged the Pinkerton National Detective Agency to target Barnes and the illegal night hunting activity around Spesutie Island.

In 1882, a male and female duo of Pinkerton detectives arrived in Harve de Grace and proceeded to infiltrate the community of commercial hunters, posing as a married couple. Appearing to be an eccentric waterfowling enthusiast, Lindsay and his “wife” purchased an expensive ducking platform and established friendly relationships with the locals, as well as Barnes and his spouse. The detectives discovered that the gang members were highly effective in concealing their activities from game wardens. Despite Lindsay’s risky nighttime surveillance, his early efforts failed to detect any poaching.

“Firing big guns, hunting at night, luring ducks into baited traps, shooting out of season, and just plain poaching took many decades to fade away on Chesapeake Bay, where in some coastal hamlets and in some families an outlaw mentality became engrained in the culture of waterfowling. It didn’t seem dishonorable or at all felonious—in the midst of such an abundance of birds—to occasionally shoot a ‘mess of ducks’ for the table or to sell a few on the side for a bit of cash.” Professor James H. McCommons in The Feather Wars (2026).

On a night patrol, Detective Lindsay observed a skiff land on a marsh. He saw a man retrieve a loaded punt gun and followed the skiff to a flock of sleeping Canvasbacks. The gun was discharged and the hunter collected his kill. Lindsay approached the boat and arrested the poacher: “Uncle Wash” Barnes. The punt gun and poached ducks were transported to Baltimore where Barnes was prosecuted and fined. Upon his return to Spesutia Island, he resumed his practice of marketing illegally killed birds.

Undeterred, the lawyer for the Carroll’s Island Club, supported by Baltimore detectives and local police, descended on Spesutia with a warrant to search for big guns. They were met by a dozen armed poachers, including Barnes, who declared they would defend themselves with deadly force rather than submit to arrest.

When Semmes pointed out that to commit a capital crime to avoid arrest for a mere misdemeanor would be absurd, the poachers relented. They were tried in the local county court after relinquishing two punt guns so as not to be prosecuted in Baltimore. At trial, locals who had grown close to the Pinkerton spy Lindsay were dismayed to discover the depth of his perfidy; some swore to murder him if he returned to Maryland.

Historian James H. McCommons reports that clandestine big gun hunting persisted for decades, only partially checked by state and federal authorities. Not until the 1940s were the last of the punt guns seized or surrendered and donated to local museums in Maryland and Virginia.

== Fictional usage ==
Desmond Bagley's 1973 thriller, The Tightrope Men, features a percussion-fired punt gun. Although the book is set in northern Finland, punt guns were never used in the country.

In his 1978 novel Chesapeake, author James A. Michener details the historical use of various punt guns (described by him as "long guns") and their impact on waterfowl numbers. One, called "The Twombly", was described as 11.6 feet (3.5 m), 110 pounds (50 kg) (with a load of 0.75 pounds (340 g) of black powder and over 1.5 pounds (680 g) of #6 shot (0.11 inches (2.8 mm)), which was used to hunt geese and ducks by the highlighted watermen of the Chesapeake Bay.

The 2004 film Tremors 4: The Legend Begins featured a punt gun used in combat. This punt gun was custom-built for the film and was 8 feet 4 inches (2.54 m) long, weighed 94 pounds (43 kg), and had a 2-inch-diameter (51 mm) bore (classified as "A" gauge by the Gun Barrel Proof Act of 1868 in Schedule B). The weapon was not actually of this bore, instead being a large prop shell concealing a 12 gauge shotgun firing triple-loaded black powder blanks, with the barrel sprayed with WD-40 water displacer to produce a large smoke cloud on firing.

In the novel Outer Dark, by Cormac McCarthy, the use of a four-gauge punt gun for hunting ducks is described.

In the Discworld novel Pyramids, mention is made of a "Puntbow", essentially a combination of this weapon and a crossbow.

In the TV show Peacemaker one is used by the character Red St. Wild to hunt down the main character's pet eagle.

== Modern Demonstration ==
In June 2026, the outdoor media company MeatEater published a video featuring Steven Rinella and Spencer Neuharth firing an 1885 Holland & Holland punt gun. The approximately seven-foot, two-gauge firearm had been purchased at auction for $20,000 and was believed not to have been fired for about a century.

Custom ammunition and a mounting system were made to allow the gun to be fired safely. Testing demonstrated the wide shot pattern and long range that made punt guns effective for commercial waterfowl hunting.

Later in 2026, MeatEater sold the gun through Rock Island Auction Company for $117,500. According to MeatEater, the sale set a record for the highest price ever paid for a punt gun. Seller waived the fees and all funds went to MeatEater's land access initiative.

== See also ==
- Gauge conversion guide
- Sneakbox, a small boat used for hunting waterfowl
- M18 Claymore mine, directional anti-personnel mine with similar effects to that said firearm.
- Canister shot

Guns of similar size or application

- Anti-materiel rifle
- Anti-tank rifle
- Jingal
- Elephant gun
- Wall gun
- Organ gun
- Volley gun
- Zamburak
- Java arquebus

== Sources ==
- McCommons, James H. 2026. The Feather Wars: And the Great Crusade to Save America’s Birds. St. Martin’s Press, New York. ISBN 978-1-250-28689-5
