= Tree stand =

Raised platform used for hunting

Tree stands or deer stands are open or enclosed platforms used by hunters. They have several advantages: they increase camouflage, lessen the hunter's scent, and prevent the deer from seeing the hunter.

The platforms are secured to trees in order to elevate the hunter and give them a better vantage point. A tripod stand is a similar device, but because it is freestanding rather than attached to a tree, it is not technically a tree stand.

== Types ==
Hunters use many different types of tree stands. The main three kinds are hang-on stands, climber stands, and ladder stands.

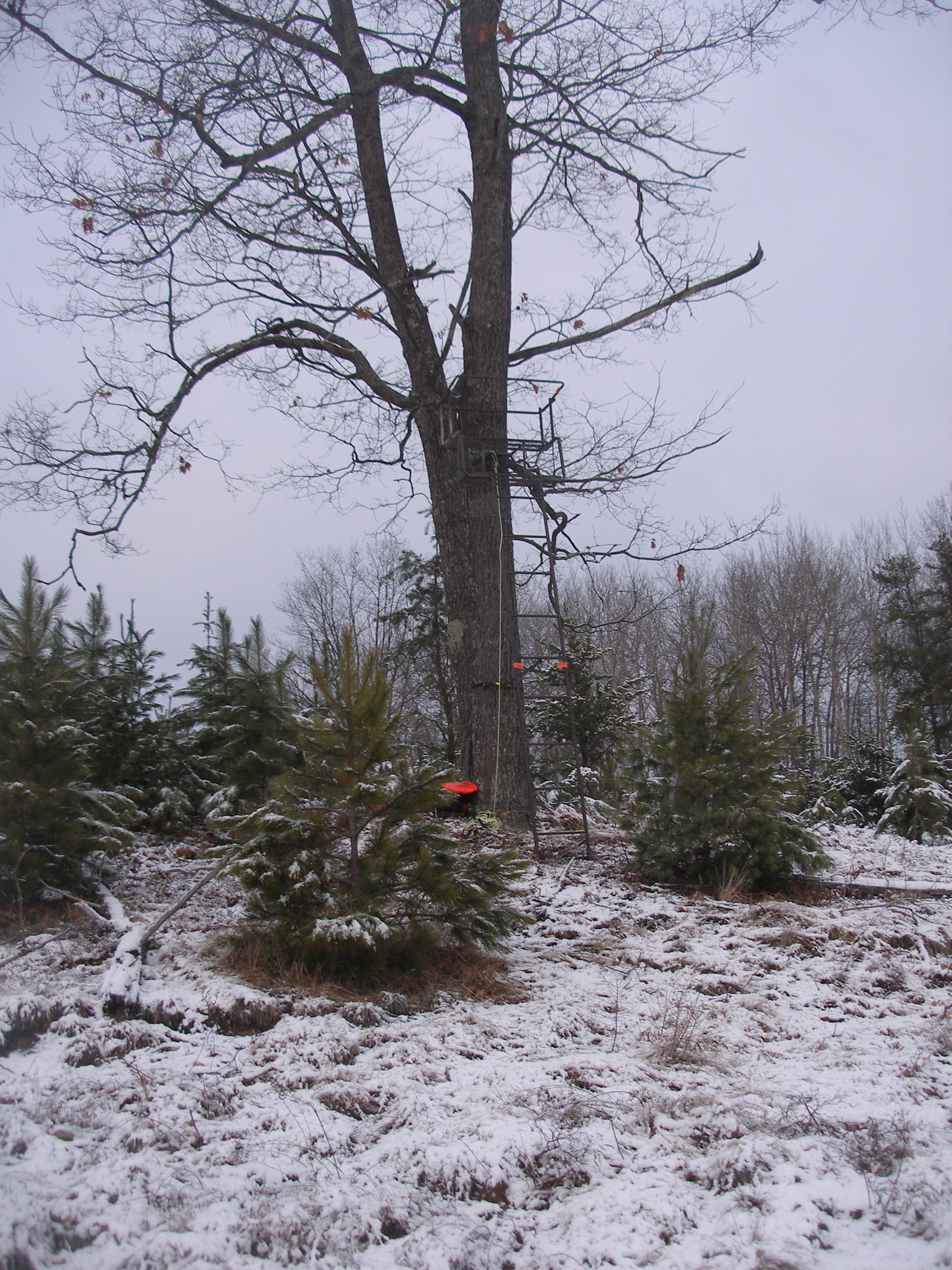
Ladder-style tree stand

=== Climbing stand ===
Two parts make up climbing stands. The bottom part is the standing platform and the top is the seat. Not all the top parts have backs for the seats. There is normally a strap that connects the two parts, so if the bottom falls while in the tree or climbing, the platform does not fall all the way to the ground, stranding the hunter. Only trees that have no limbs up to the height desired for hunting will work.

Climbing tree stands have a couple of different styles to connect to the tree. The part that wraps around the tree can be made from a thick cable or boomerang shaped piece of metal. The part that wraps around the tree is fastened to the stand with a bolt or pin for easy adjustment for different tree sizes.

Before climbing the tree both parts need to be adjusted to the tree so that both upper and lower parts are angled up to account for the narrowing of the tree. To climb the tree the back of each part is angled to the tree one at a time and pulled up. Then the part that the hunter is moving is set back level and the next part is moved up. This is done until the hunter is at the desired height. In addition to the tree stand, some hunters use a safety harness to prevent injury in the event that any component of the tree stand fails. One should always be connected to the tree for safety. To descend the tree, the hunter simply reverses the order of operations to climb the tree – lowering the standing platform, standing on the standing platform, then lowering the sitting platform.

=== Ladder stand ===
Ladder stands are a stand with a seat and platform along with the ladder to climb up into the stand. A ladder stand has a seat and platform that connect to the tree with the ladder coming off the front of the platform to give the hunter access to the stand. Ladder stands are stationary because of the size and lack of ability to move through the woods quietly. Stability is good because of the connection to the tree and support from the ground. Hunters can use one and two person ladder stands.

=== Hanging stand ===
Hanging stands can resemble ladder stands without the ladder, and the hanging stand is also stationary. Hanging stands connect to the tree with chains or cables at the desired height. To get up to a hanging stand hunters use ladders or sections of ladders secured to the tree (called "climbing sticks"), or they use screw in steps that screw in the tree and allow the hunter to climb up to the stand.

=== Box stand ===
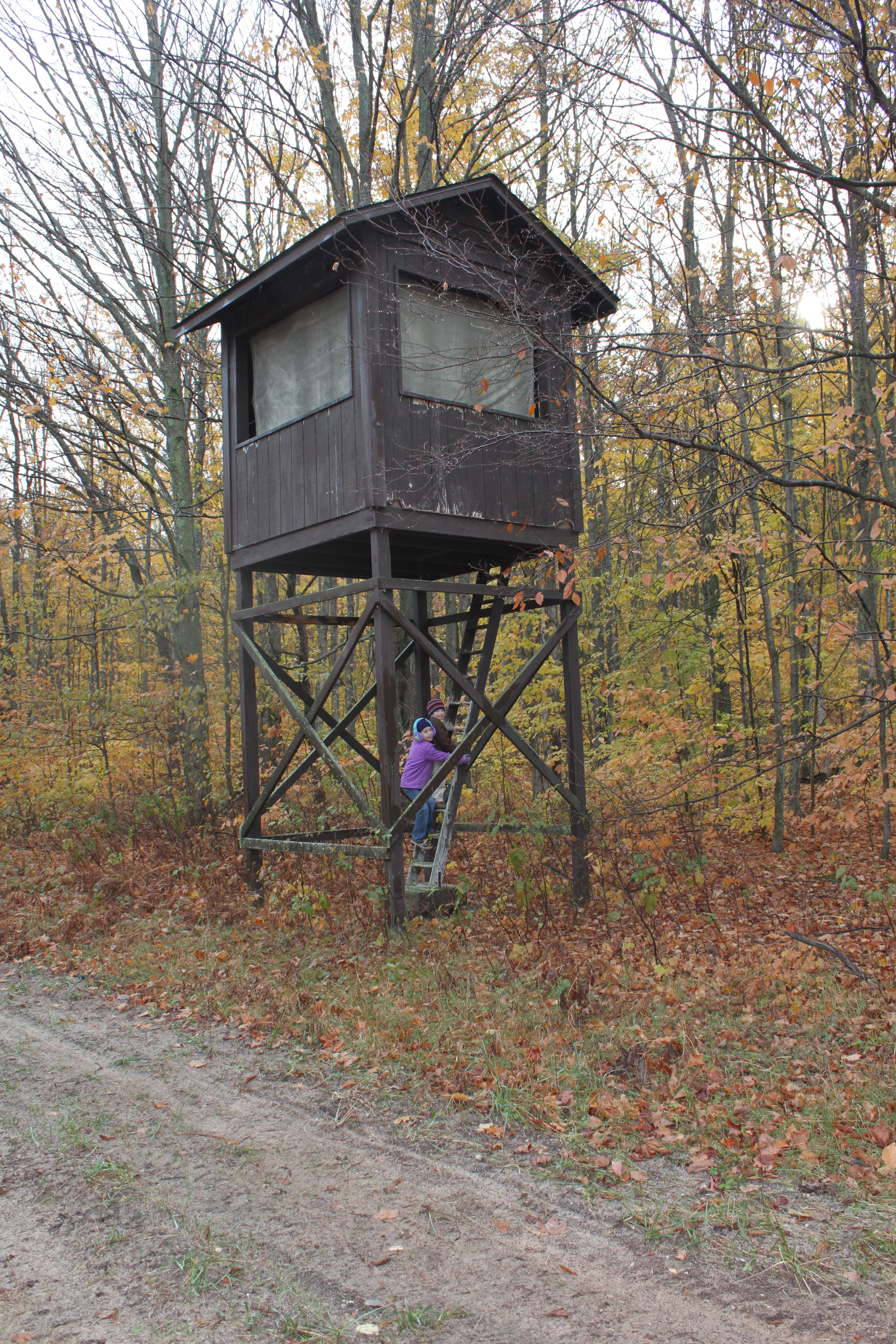
Elevated "Box" type hunting blind

Box stands are large enclosed stands that almost look like a shed; they can be built to various heights with ladders or steps to enter when elevated. These are designed to help get out of the weather and keep one hidden from view of game. Most are made from lumber with plywood walls and flooring with a wood or metal roof. They are designed mostly for use along the edge of fields, where a hunter can see long distances.

== Uses ==
The inherent functional flexibility of tree stands allows hunters to use them in different ways.

Tree stands can give the hunter an advantage, as the hunter sits up in a tree. This allows the hunter to see over intervening brush and vegetation that might otherwise block the hunter's view of approaching game. The advantage is not always clear, however, as early fall hunting in hardwoods bottoms can result in shortened line of sight, mostly because of heavy foliage still on the trees. This can be remedied by cutting shooting lanes for bows and firearms to see better from the tree stand.

Hunters use climbing stands to take the stand to different locations easily. Although not permanent like ladder stands and hanging stands, they can relocate a hunter to a different tree easily. Some hunters do leave them in the woods at the base of the tree. Climbing stands allow hunters that want to hunt from them to use a climbing stand at a location that will not allow them to keep a stand up during the whole season. Often ladder stands and hanging stands do not move easily, so they tend to stay on one tree. Because branches limit climbing stand use, ladder stands and hanging stands allow hunters more options on the trees with many branches at a lower height.

A few accessories are available for tree stands. Rope from the stand to the ground allows the hunter to pull up accessories or their weapon once in the stand. Besides the safety, hanging, ladder, and rope equipment, hunters can get:

- Bow holders
- Shooting rests
- Blinds for around the stand
- Covers over the stand
- Umbrellas to protect the hunter from rain
- Seat pads
- Camouflage tape to disguise the stand

== Safety ==
Safety is the biggest consideration for tree stands. A body harness is the most important part of tree stand safety. Many different styles of harness can keep hunters safe. One harness compiled of a belt around the waist of the person and one around tree with a strap between the two can keep the hunter safe. Another harness is a full body harness, which has shoulder straps and straps around the legs. The full body harness attaches to the tree the same way the belt harness does. Attaching the harness as soon as the hunter is in the tree keeps the hunter safe while setting up for the hunt. The strap between the harness and strap around the tree should be long enough to allow the hunter to move a little and short enough so if the hunter falls they do not fall too far.

Tree stand users should always check over their stands to ensure good working condition. A tree stand in poor condition can be unsafe for the hunter to hunt from. Checking the steps up to the stand for safely and stability can prevent falling while climbing up to the stand.

Common causes of injuries include structural failure, carelessness, and falling asleep. Common kinds of resulting injuries include spine fracture, extremity fracture, head injury, pelvic fracture, and rib fracture. Most injuries occur with home-built deer stands rather than commercial stands.

== See also ==
- Deer hunting
- Stand level modelling
- Tree shelter
