= Sinkbox =

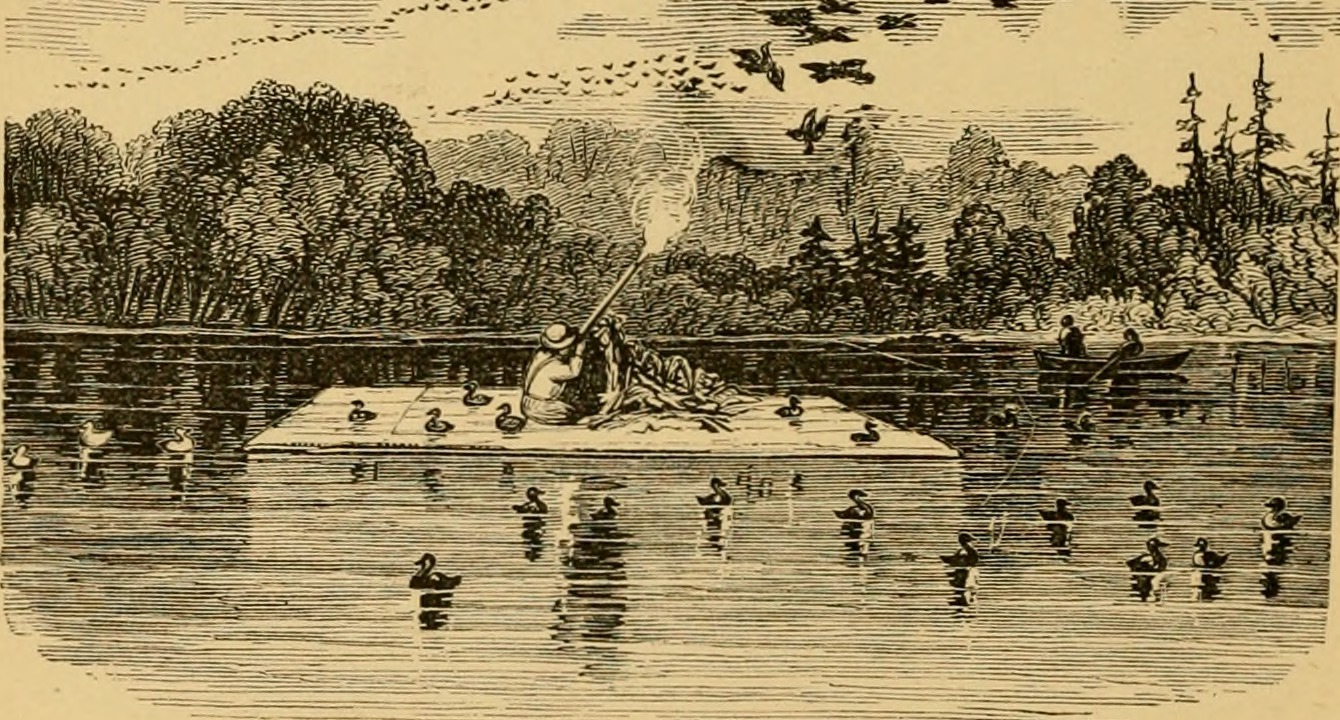
Sketch of a sinkbox.

A sinkbox is a specialized hunting blind used by waterfowl hunters. It consists of a weighted, partially submerged enclosure large enough to hold one or more hunters and suspended from a floating platform. It is placed into calm water so that the hunter may wait with the waterline at approximately shoulder height.

Sinkboxes were typically used by market (rather than sport) hunters for duck or other waterfowl in both the United States and Canada.

== Current use ==
In 1918 below-waterline hunting was banned in the United States by authority of the U.S. Secretary of the Interior with the passage of the Migratory Bird Act of 1918. Sinkbox hunting is still practiced in Canada, but is largely a relic of the past.

== As antiques ==
Cast-iron sinkbox decoys — often painted — were used as ballast, to disguise the sinkbox, and to attract game close to the hunters. The cast-iron decoys are popular among antique collectors.
