= Cocking-cloth =

Device that was used for catching pheasants

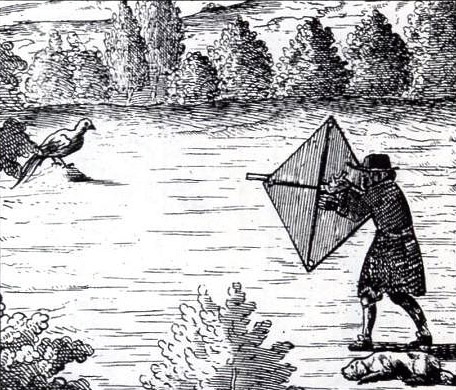
Detail from the engraving "Pearching the Pheasant" in The Gentleman's Recreation, 1686, by Richard Blome.

In hunting tactics, a cocking-cloth was a device used for catching pheasants, similar in construction to a kite.

It consists of a piece of coarse canvas, about an ell square, or 45 inches (114 cm) on side, tanned, and kept stretched by two sticks, placed from corner to corner, diagonal-wise; a hole is left to see through. The hunter, then, armed with a short gun, carries the cloth before him at arm's length; under cover of which, he may approach his game as near as he pleases. When near enough, he puts the barrel of the gun through the hole, and fires.

Richard Blome, in The Gentleman's Recreation (1686), called this technique "cocking-cloth at crowing time." According to him, at "crowing time", the pheasants "will let you come near them, and the cocks will be so bold as to fly at [the cocking-cloth]."
