= Richard Blome =

Publisher

Richard Blome (1635–1705) was an engraver, cartographer, and publisher in the Kingdom of England.

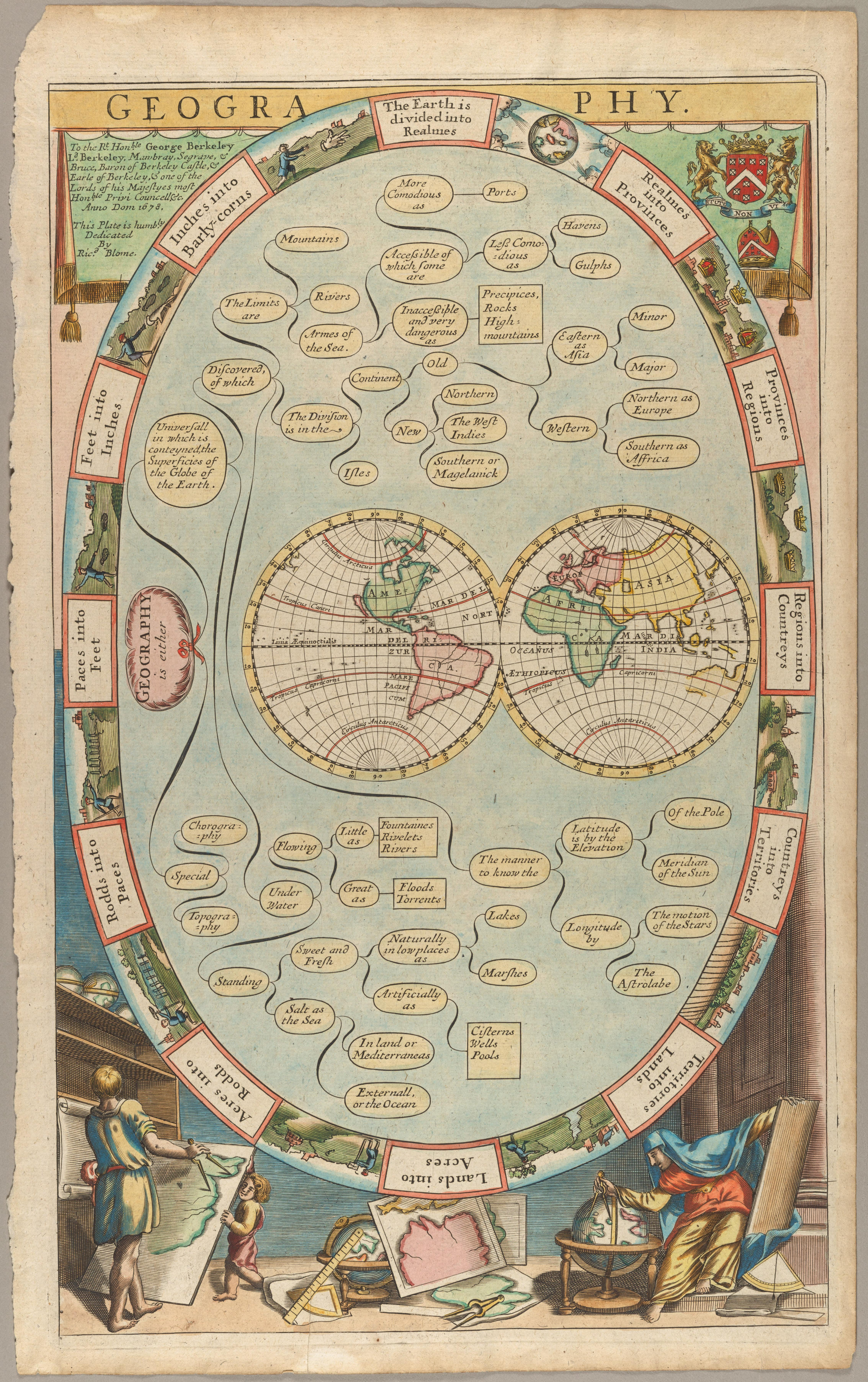
Plate from Richard Blome and Nicolas Cox's The Gentleman's Recreation (1686), illustrating the various applications of geography

== Works ==
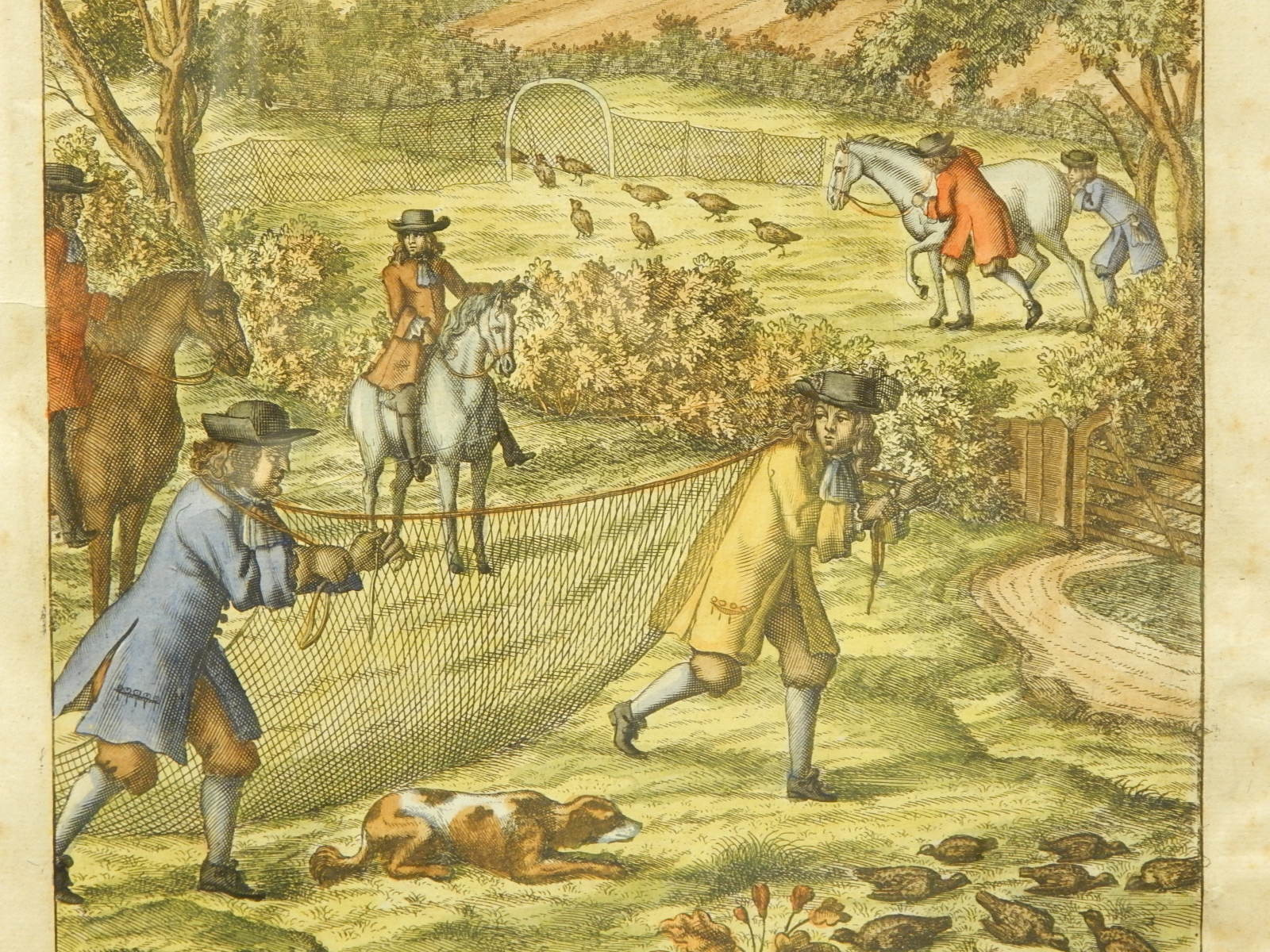
"The Setting Dogg & Partridgs" (detail)' from The Gentlemans Recreation (1686)

- 1670 A Geographical Description of the Four Parts of the World
- 1673 Britannia, or a Geographical Description of the Kingdom of England, Scotland and Ireland (average size 315 x 280 mm)
- 1681 Speed's Maps Epitomiz'd (average size 180 x 230 mm) 1685 Re-issued 1693 Re-issued in Cosmography and Geography 1715 Re-published by Thomas Taylor in England Exactly described c. 1750 Re-issued by Thomas Bakewell (1716–64)
- 1682 Cosmography and Geography (by Bernhard Varen) 1683-93 Re-issued
- 1686 The Gentlemans Recreation
- 1687 Isles and Territories of America for Anthony Earl of Shaftesbury (and in 1688 a French edition)
