= A Bloom of Bones =

2016 novel by Allen Morris Jones

- Author: Allen Morris Jones
- Genre: Novel
- Published: 2016 (Ig Publishing)
- Publication place: United States
- Media type: Print (hardback, paperback)
- Pages: 234
- ISBN: 9781632460455
- OCLC: 945949070

A Bloom of Bones: a novel is a 2016 novel by Allen Morris Jones. It follows the life of Eli Singer, a rancher and poet, in eastern Montana.

== Reception ==
A Library Journal review of A Bloom of Bones wrote "The dry-as-bones Montana landscape perfectly captures the emotional state of the story's two central characters as they struggle toward something each wants but neither quite knows how to get.", while Missoula Independent called Jones "a top-notch storyteller." and, although being critical of Jones' portrayal of the relationship between Singer and Barnes, found the novel "a compelling illustration of how a certain section of the population lives, and a worthy addition to the literary canon of the West."

A Bloom of Bones has also been reviewed by Kirkus Reviews, Publishers Weekly, and Forward Reviews.

It is a 2016 Montana Book Award honor book.
