= Harveys Lake (Pennsylvania) =

Lake in Pennsylvania, United States

- Harvey Lake, Harvey's Lake
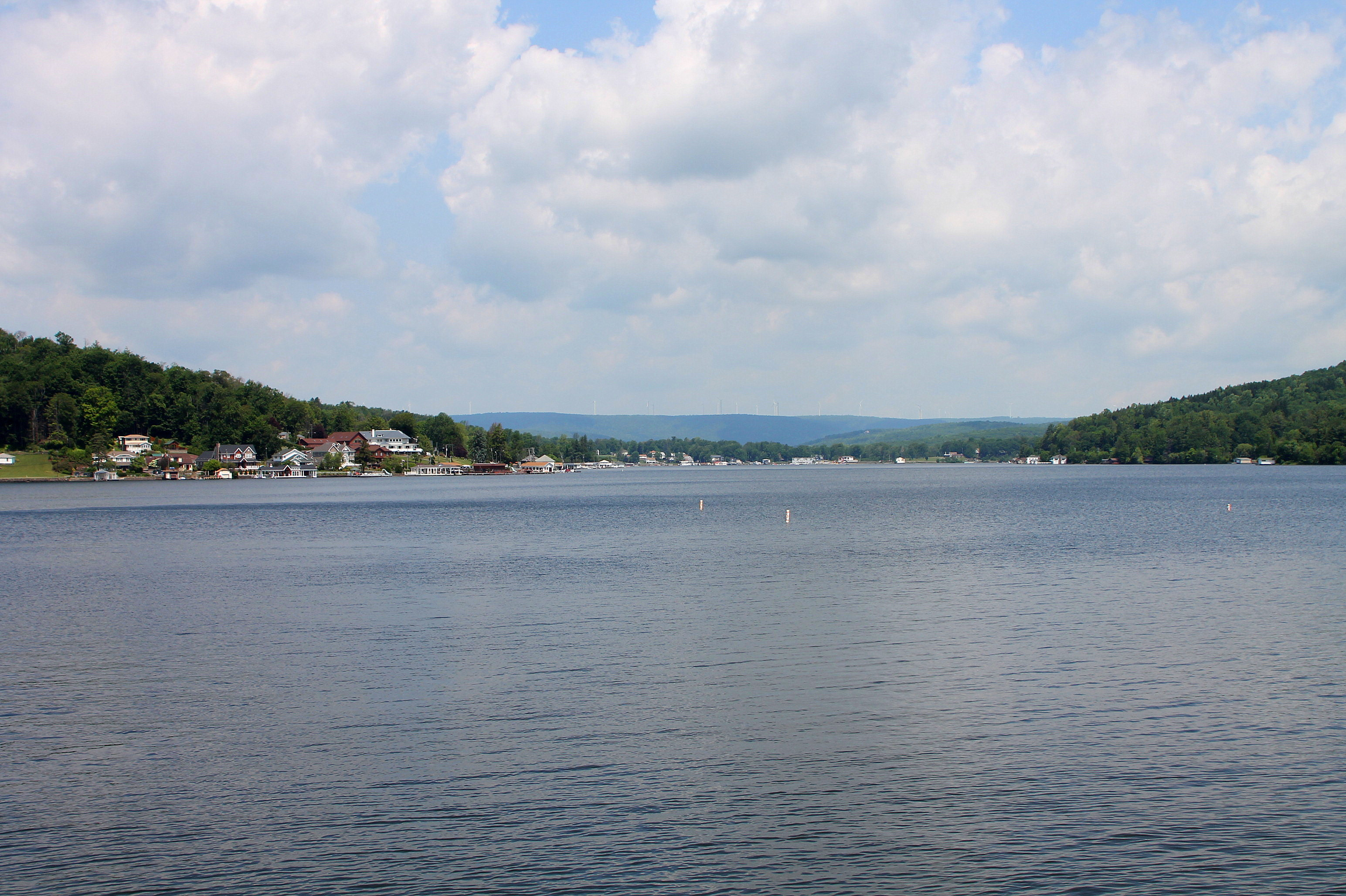
- Harveys Lake from the south

- Location within Pennsylvania Location within the United States
- Location: Harveys Lake, Luzerne County, Pennsylvania; Wyoming County, Pennsylvania (Watershed only)
- Coordinates: 41°21′54″N 76°02′31″W
- Type: glacial lake
- Etymology: Named after Benjamin Harvey, its discoverer
- Primary inflows: two unnamed streams, several springs
- Primary outflows: Harveys Creek
- Catchment area: 3,600 acres (1,500 ha)
- Basin countries: United States
- Max. length: 15,640 ft (4,770 m)
- Max. width: 4,960 ft (1,510 m)
- Surface area: 621.5 acres (251.5 ha)
- Average depth: 36 ft (11 m)
- Max. depth: 102 ft (31 m)
- Water volume: 7.733×10^{9} US gal (6.439×10^{9} imp gal; 29.27 hm^{3})
- Residence time: 1116 days
- Shore length^{1}: 8.3 mi (13.4 km)
- Surface elevation: 1,253 ft (382 m)
- ^{1} Shore length is not a well-defined measure.

Harveys Lake (also known as Harvey Lake or Harvey's Lake) is a natural lake in Luzerne County, Pennsylvania. It has a surface area of approximately 621.5 acres (251.5 ha), or nearly a square mile. The lake is situated entirely within the borough of Harveys Lake. By volume, it is the largest natural lake in Pennsylvania, and by surface area, is the second-largest lake. It is a glacial lake surrounded by hills and is the source of Harveys Creek, a tributary of the Susquehanna River. The lake has a stone masonry dam. The lake's watershed has an area of approximately 3600 acres. The majority of the watershed is forested, but there is some developed land as well. Nearly all of the developed land is close to the lake itself, and the lake is surrounded entirely by a paved road.

Harveys Lake was affected by algae blooms from the mid-20th century onward, and these algae blooms were caused by pollution of nutrients, especially phosphorus. The lake was identified as impaired in 1994, with an annual phosphorus load of 1,019 pounds (462 kg). However, the phosphorus load has been reduced somewhat since then. The lake is listed on the Luzerne County Natural Areas Inventory. A number of rare or endangered plant species have been observed in its vicinity. Various species of fish inhabit the lake and a number of bird species have been observed in its vicinity.

Harveys Lake was accidentally discovered by Benjamin Harvey in 1781. The first settlers arrived at the lake in the 1790s and 1800s. Early industries in the area included lumbering and farming, but it became well known as a summer resort in the latter part of the 1800s and into the 1900s. It was also used as a water supply in the early 1900s. However, the lake began to develop significant environmental problems in the 1960s and a total maximum daily load was created for it in 1994. Since 1968, the lake has been located in the borough of Harveys Lake.

== Geography ==
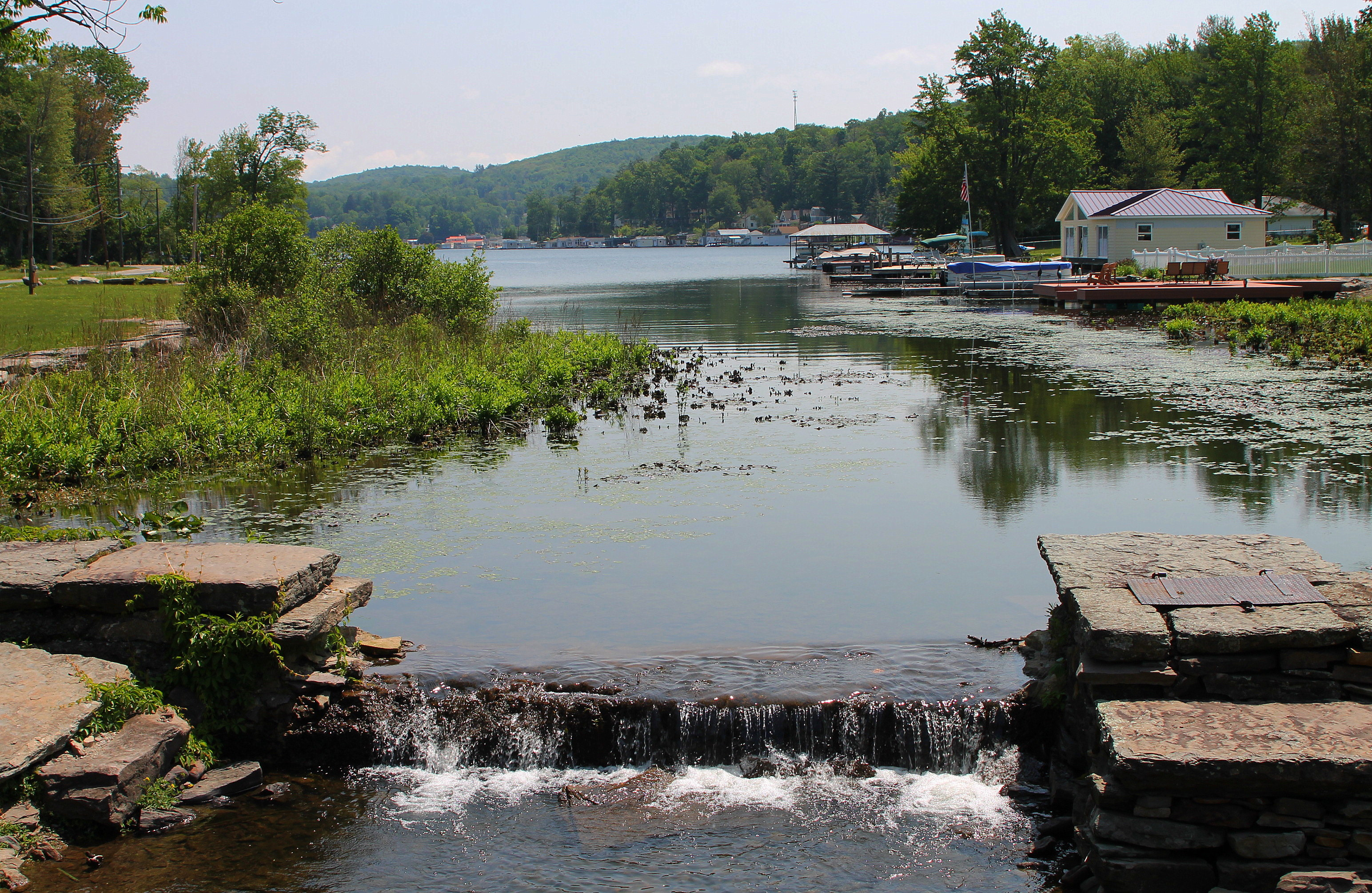
Harveys Lake dam

Harveys Lake is the largest natural lake in Pennsylvania by volume and the second-largest by surface area. It has a surface area of 621.5 acres (251.5 ha) and an average depth of 36 feet (11 meters), as well as a maximum depth of 102 feet (31 m). The lake's shoreline is 8.3 miles (13.4 km) long. By surface area, it was approximately twice its current size when it was first surveyed in the late 1700s.

Harveys Lake is situated in the borough of Harveys Lake, and it is 12 miles (19 km) northwest of the city of Wilkes-Barre.

Harveys Lake is of glacial origin. It is surrounded by steep hills on all sides. At their highest point, to the south of the lake, the hills reach 410 feet (120 m) above the lake's elevation. The lake has a gravel bottom.

The main outflow of Harveys Lake is Harveys Creek, a tributary of the Susquehanna River. The lake's major inflows include two unnamed streams with widths between 4 and 8 feet (1.2 and 2.4 m) and depths of 6 inches (15 cm). Springs also feed into it. The lake's elevation is 1,253 feet (382 m) above sea level. The lake is located in north-central Luzerne County, in the Lower North Branch Susquehanna drainage basin and the Upper Susquehanna - Lackawanna basin.

A 1921 book described the shape of Harveys Lake as "very irregular". The lake has a maximum length of 15,640 feet (4,770 m) and a maximum width of 4,960 feet (1,510 m). It has a capacity of 7.733 billion US gallons (29.27 million cubic metres). Harveys Lake is dammed by a stone masonry dam with two spillways. The dam is 120 feet (37 m) long and 4 feet (1.2 m) high.

Harveys Lake was described as "one of the most beautiful" lakes in Pennsylvania in Henry C. Bradsby's 1893 book History of Luzerne County, Pennsylvania.

== Watershed ==
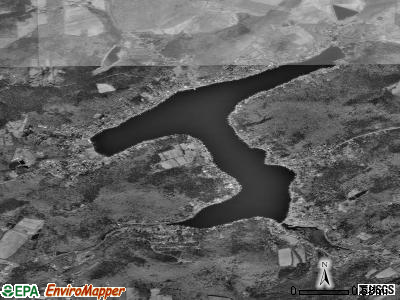
Satellite imagery of Harveys Lake

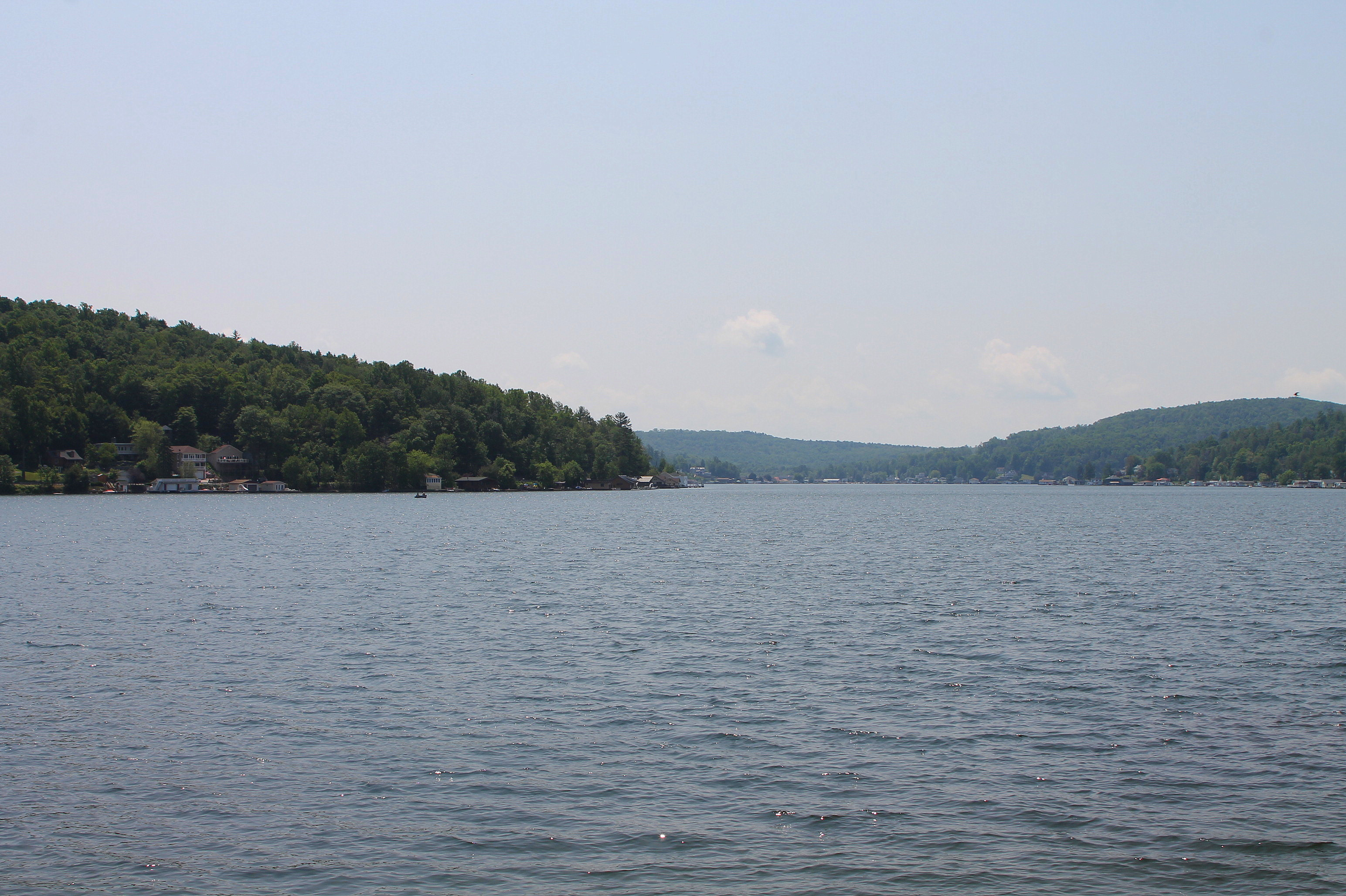
Harveys Lake from the north

Harveys Lake is situated in the United States Geological Survey quadrangles of Harveys Lake and Noxen. The watershed of the lake has an area of 3,600 acres (1,500 ha). Most of the watershed is in Luzerne County, but its northeasternmost portion is in Wyoming County.

The vast majority (2,841 acres [1,150 ha]) of the watershed of Harveys Lake is forested land. Developed land and farmland comprise 499 acres (202 ha) and 154.7 acres (62.6 ha), respectively. Unpaved roads make up 2.5 acres (1.0 ha) of the watershed. The majority of the developed land in the watershed is directly on the shoreline and nearly all is within 0.5 miles (0.80 km) of the lake. Most of the developed land is used for residential and commercial purposes. One developed area in the watershed is known as Hemlock Gardens, which occupies an area of 28 acres (11 ha) and has 26 homes. The development had steep slopes (8 to 18 percent grade), unpaved roads, and no infrastructure for dealing with stormwater. However, a nutrient-separating baffle box and a water polishing unit were installed in the development, reducing the phosphorus load of Harveys Lake by an estimated 36 pounds (16 kg) per year.

The shoreline of Harveys Lake is entirely surrounded by a paved road, which is atypical for a lake shoreline. Homes and cottages are situated on the road opposite the lake, and significant development has occurred in the vicinity of the lake. A ditch and outlet drainage structure made of concrete at Wardens Place drains into the lake; its purpose is to control small-scale local road flooding.

== Hydrology ==
Although Harveys Lake's waters were described as having "great purity" in 1893, the lake has experienced nutrient pollution, especially from phosphorus since at least the mid-20th century. Algae blooms occurred on the lake and caused a reduction in water quality throughout the latter half of the 20th century. A sewage system was installed in the borough of Harveys Lake in the summer of 1976, but this did not completely stop the algae blooms. However, the phosphorus load in the lake has been reduced by 29 percent. The lake was identified as impaired in 1994, with the cause of the impairment being large algae blooms and sedimentation in some areas. It is an anoxic lake.

In the 1990s, the concentration of phosphorus in the waters of Harveys Lake was measured to be 0.031 milligrams per liter. The annual load of phosphorus was 1,019 pounds (462 kg) per year. The lake's total maximum daily load for phosphorus is 0.024 milligrams per liter and 789 pounds (358 kg) per year.

In the 1990s, 255 pounds (116 kg) of the annual phosphorus load of Harveys Lake came from internal loading, 233 pounds (106 kg) came from groundwater, 199 pounds (90 kg) came from developed land, and 150 pounds (68 kg) came from shorelines. Smaller sources of phosphorus included farmland (95 pounds (43 kg) per year), forests (51 pounds (23 kg) per year), septic systems (33 pounds (15 kg) per year), and unpaved roads (3.4 pounds (1.5 kg) per year).

The hydraulic residence time of Harveys Lake is 1116 days. The lake causes substantially reduced peak flood flows on Harveys Creek. Visibility in the lake is typically approximately 10 feet (3.0 m). However, it can be as low as 5 feet (1.5 m) or as high as 15 feet (4.6 m).

== History and recreation ==
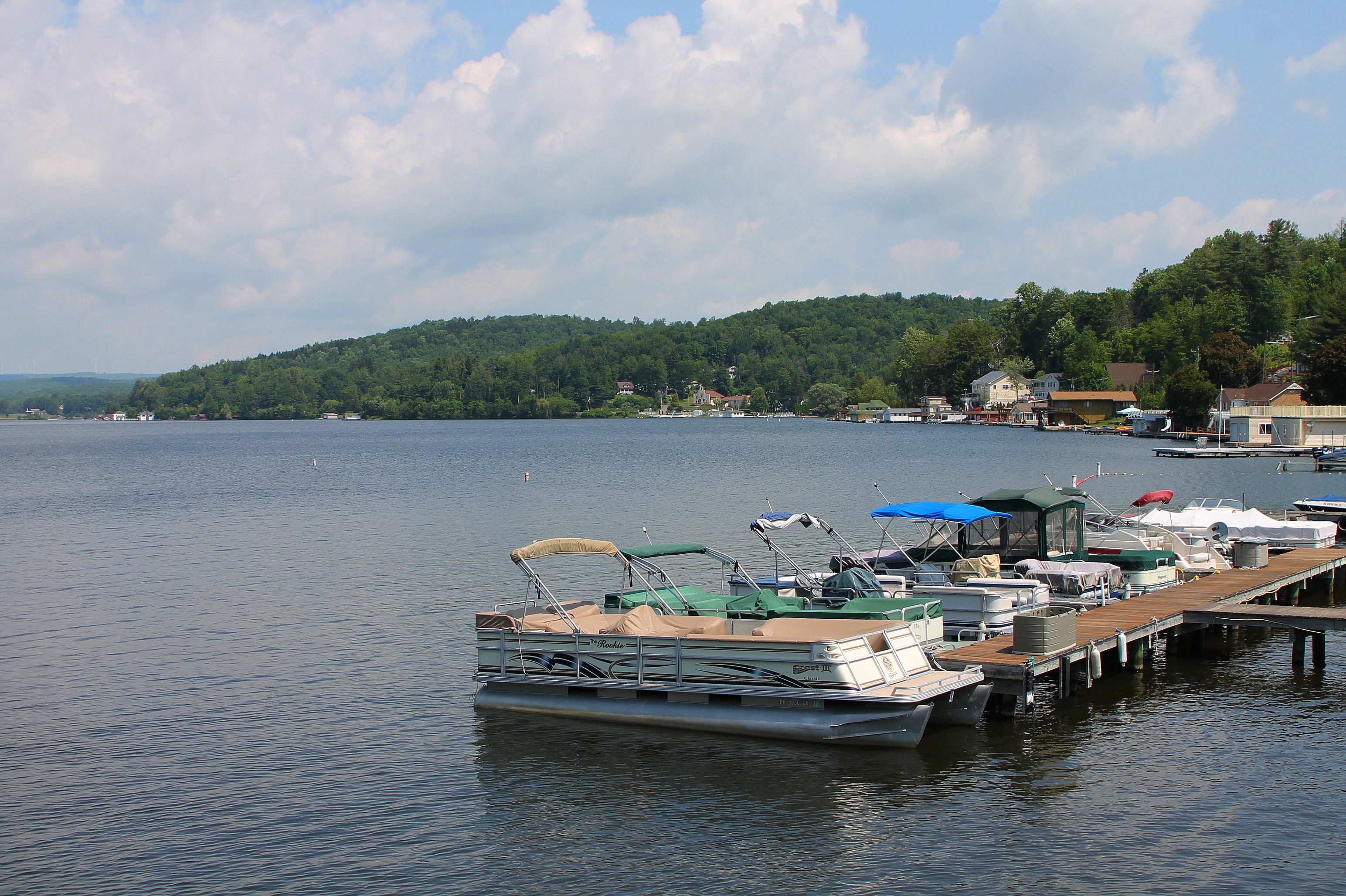
Boats on Harveys Lake

Harveys Lake was entered into the Geographic Names Information System on August 2, 1979. Its identifier in the Geographic Names Information System is 1200085. Lake Township is named after the lake.

Harveys Lake is named after Benjamin Harvey, a member of the Sons of Liberty and among the first settlers of the Wyoming Valley. Harvey inadvertently discovered the lake in 1781, while returning home after being held as a prisoner of war in Fort Niagara. The first resident in the vicinity of the lake was Matthew Scouten, who arrived in the early 1790s, but the first settlers were the Worthingtons, who arrived in 1806. The lake was first surveyed by Christopher Hurlbert in 1794, and the first person of European descent to explore the lake by canoe was Andrew Bennett, in 1800.

The early settlers in the vicinity of Harveys Lake mainly engaged in lumbering and farming, which was a common occupation. At one point during the 1800s, the mills of Hollenback & Urquhart were cutting more than a million board feet of lumber annually at the lake. However, by 1853, summer resorts used by Wyoming Valley residents began appearing near the lake. Hotels such as the Lake House Hotel and later the Rhoads Hotel, the Lake Grove Hotel, and the Grand Hotel Oneonta were among the hotels on the lake in the late 1800s. Grand Hotel Oneonta was especially prominent in the early 1900s, and former United States President Theodore Roosevelt visited the hotel in August 1912. In the early 1900s, there were three hotels, two hundred cottages, and sixty boathouses on the lake, most of them at least 15 feet (4.6 m) above the water line.

The Harvey Lake and Towanda Branch of the Lehigh Valley Railroad was constructed in the late 1800s. It ran directly from Wilkes-Barre to Harveys Lake. In the 1890s, railroad lines were constructed from the lake to the communities of Pittston and Towanda.

Harveys Lake has been popular for recreational purposes since the late 1800s. Places such as Warden Place and Sandy Beach were popular recreational areas near the lake in the early 1900s. Around this time period, there were four steamboats on Harveys Lake. They were used for carrying passengers and freight. Recreational steamboat rides on the lake were popular between 1900 and 1920. A 60-foot (18-meter) high Shoot the Chute was built in the area by Charles Shelley in 1910. It was one of the largest attractions in the lake's vicinity. A casino near the lake was opened by Frank Devlin in May 1924, but was demolished in 1980. Devlin also opened the largest bowling alley in Northeastern Pennsylvania near the lake. Throughout the 20th century, prior to and after World War II, the lake attracted thousands of visitors yearly.

In the early 1900s, Harveys Lake was used as a water supply for Nanticoke, as a private ice supply, and as a summer resort.

Harveys Lake has been the subject of scientific studies since the late 1940s, when C. B. Reif conducted limnological studies on it. By the 1960s, Harveys Lake began to develop environmental problems. It was the subject of a number of studies in the late 1980s and early 1990s. These studies indicated that the lake was eutrophic. Algae blooms caused it to be closed to swimming in 1981 and 1990. The Pennsylvania Department of Environmental Protection completed a phosphorus TMDL for the lake in 2002.

In modern times, the main recreational uses of Harveys Lake include swimming, fishing, and boating. However, it lacks public access locations for SCUBA diving. According to its TMDL document, the lake is "one of the most heavily used lakes in the area". It has been situated within the borough of Harveys Lake since January 1, 1968, when the borough was incorporated. In 2004, a plan to dredge and develop a patch of wetland for 30 boat slips near the lake was opposed due to safety concerns (poor visibility) as well as environmental concerns.

=== Historical gallery ===
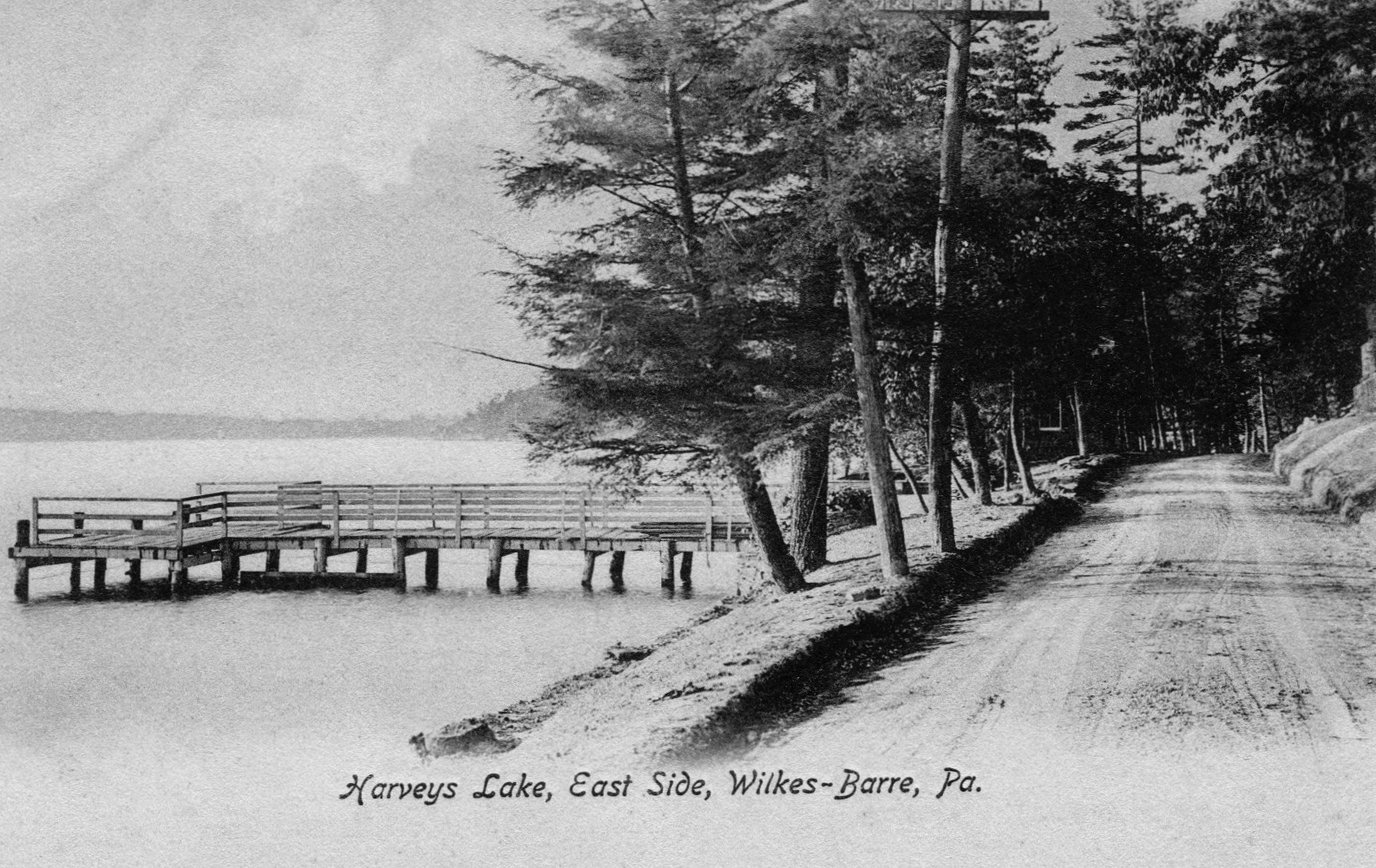
A view of the east side of Harveys Lake, ca 1907.

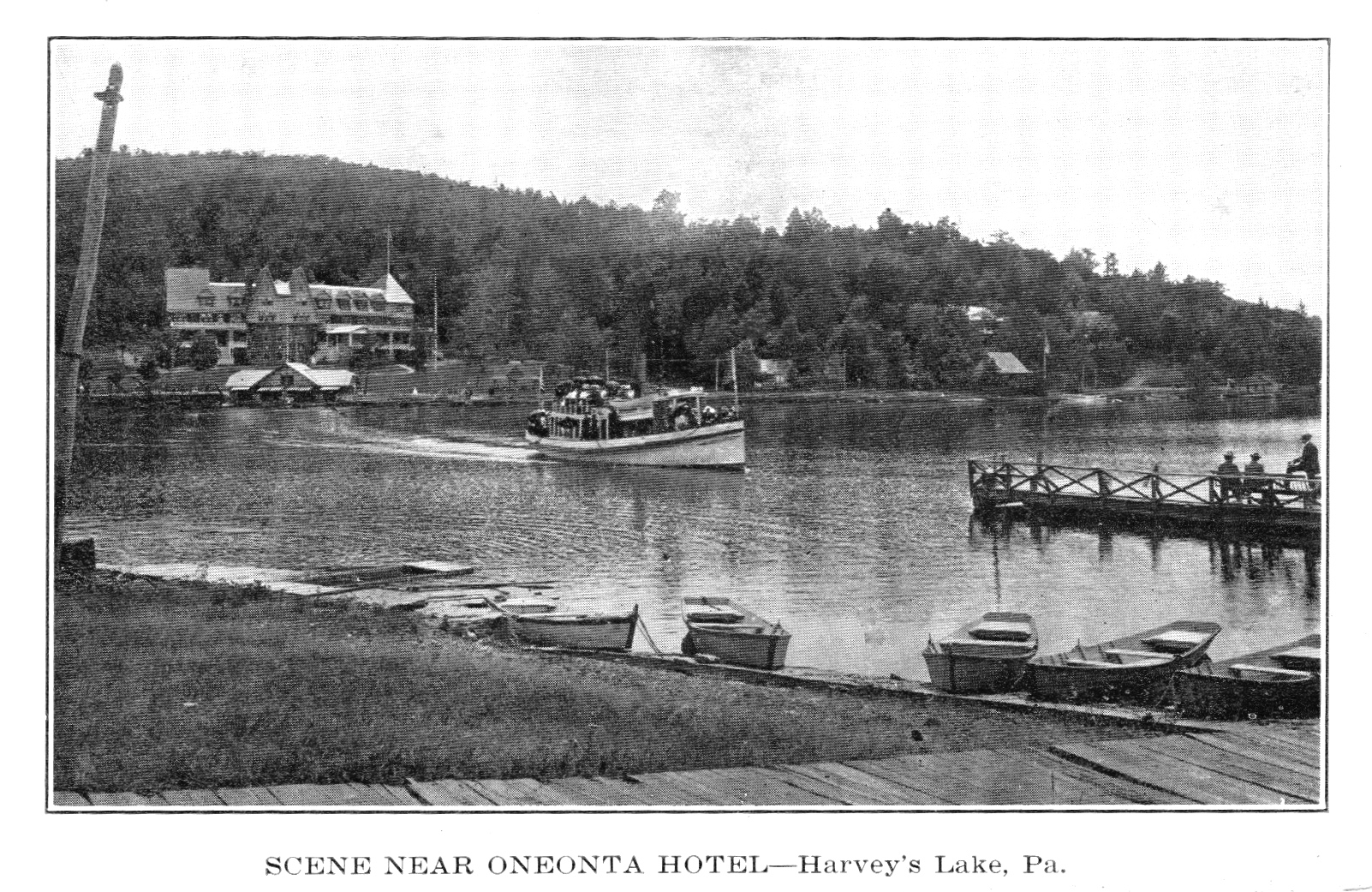
Steamboat Excursion, ca 1910.

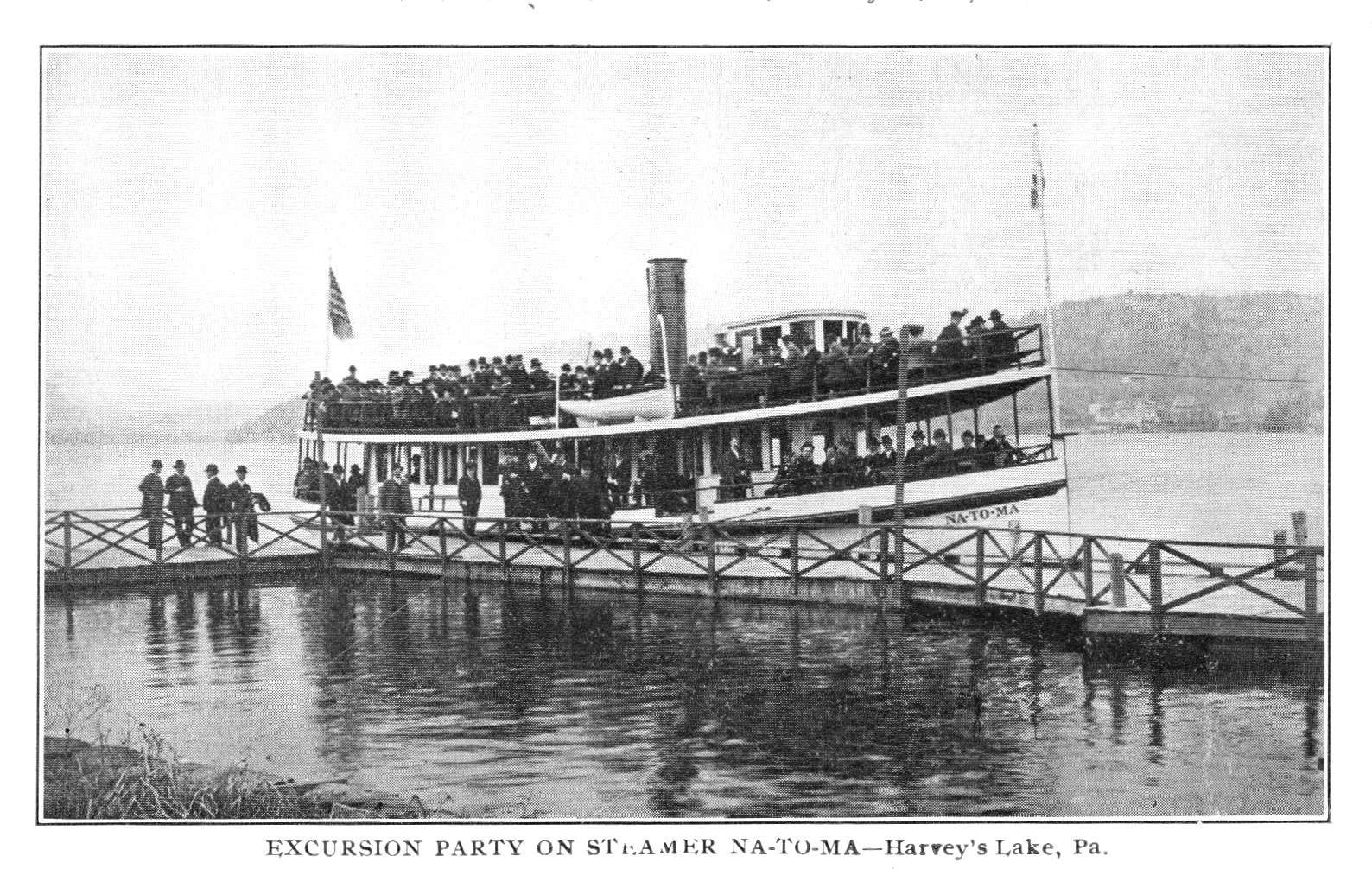
Steamer NA-TO-MA, ca 1910.

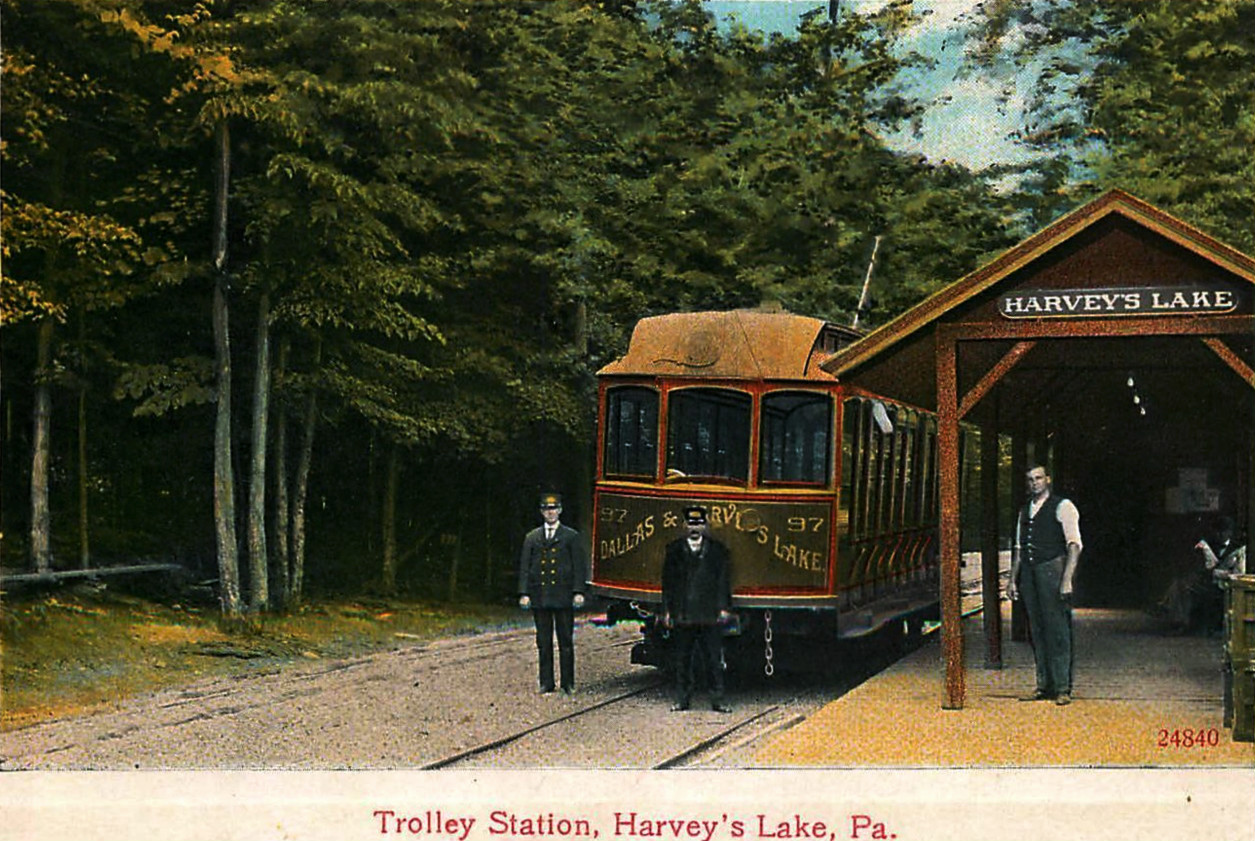
Harveys Lake Trolley Station, ca 1912.

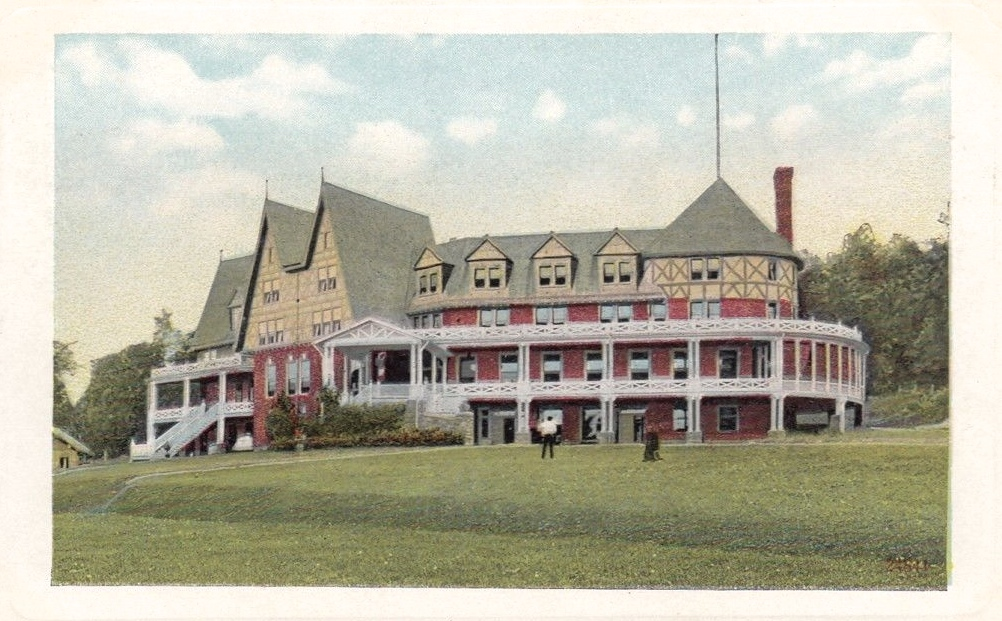
Hotel Oneonta, ca 1915.

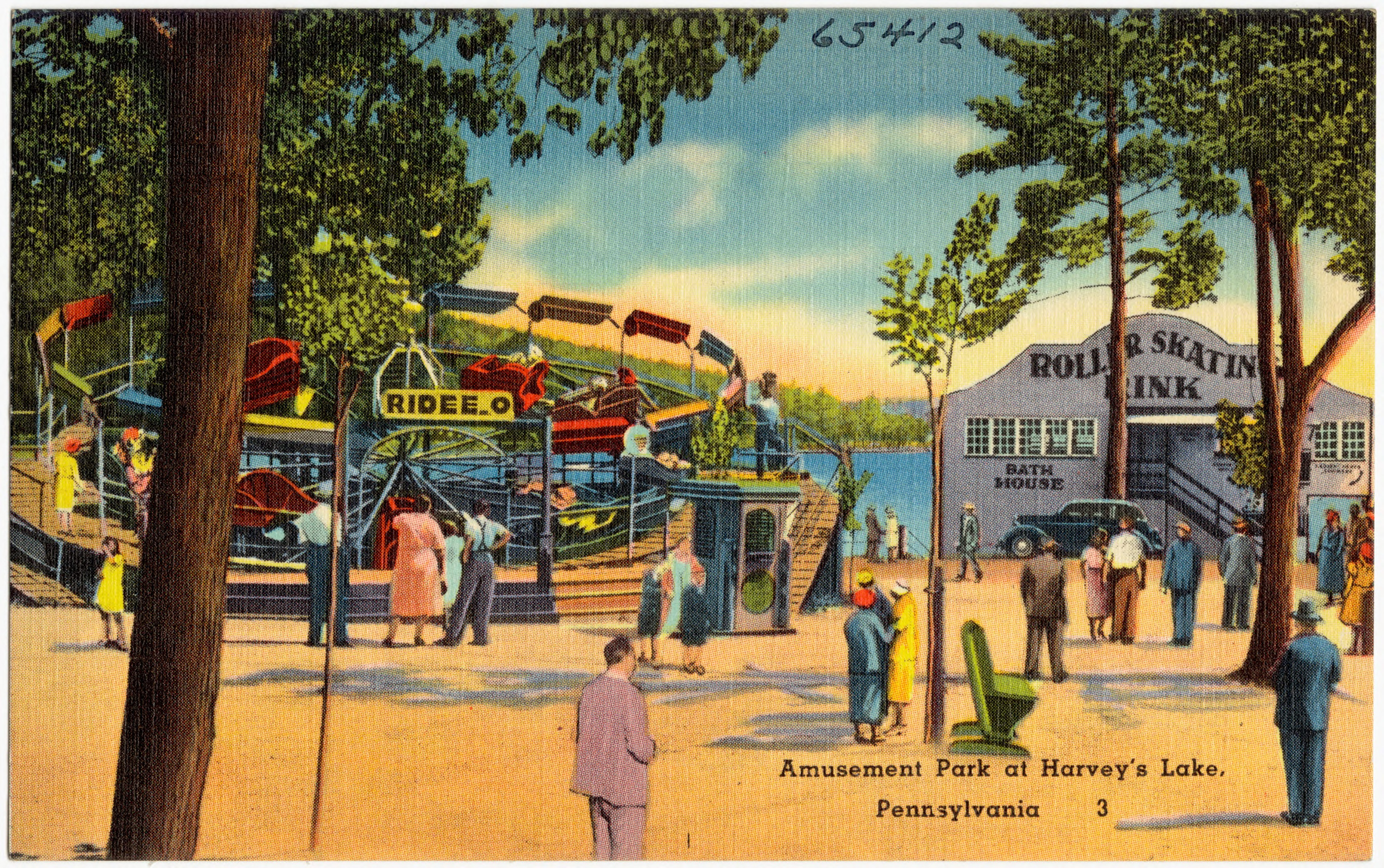
Hanson's Amusement Park, ca 1930.

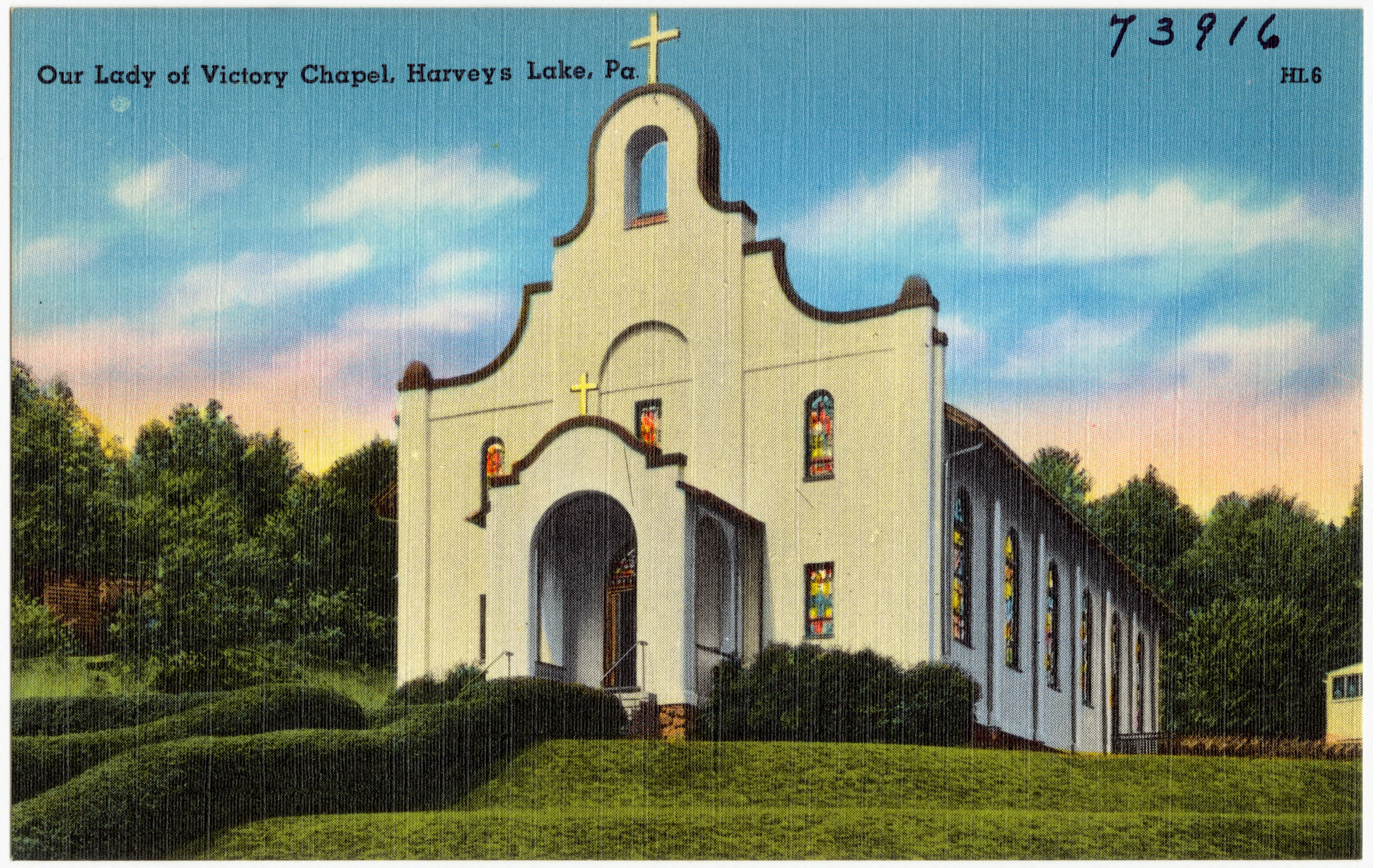
Our Lady of Victory Chapel, ca 1940.

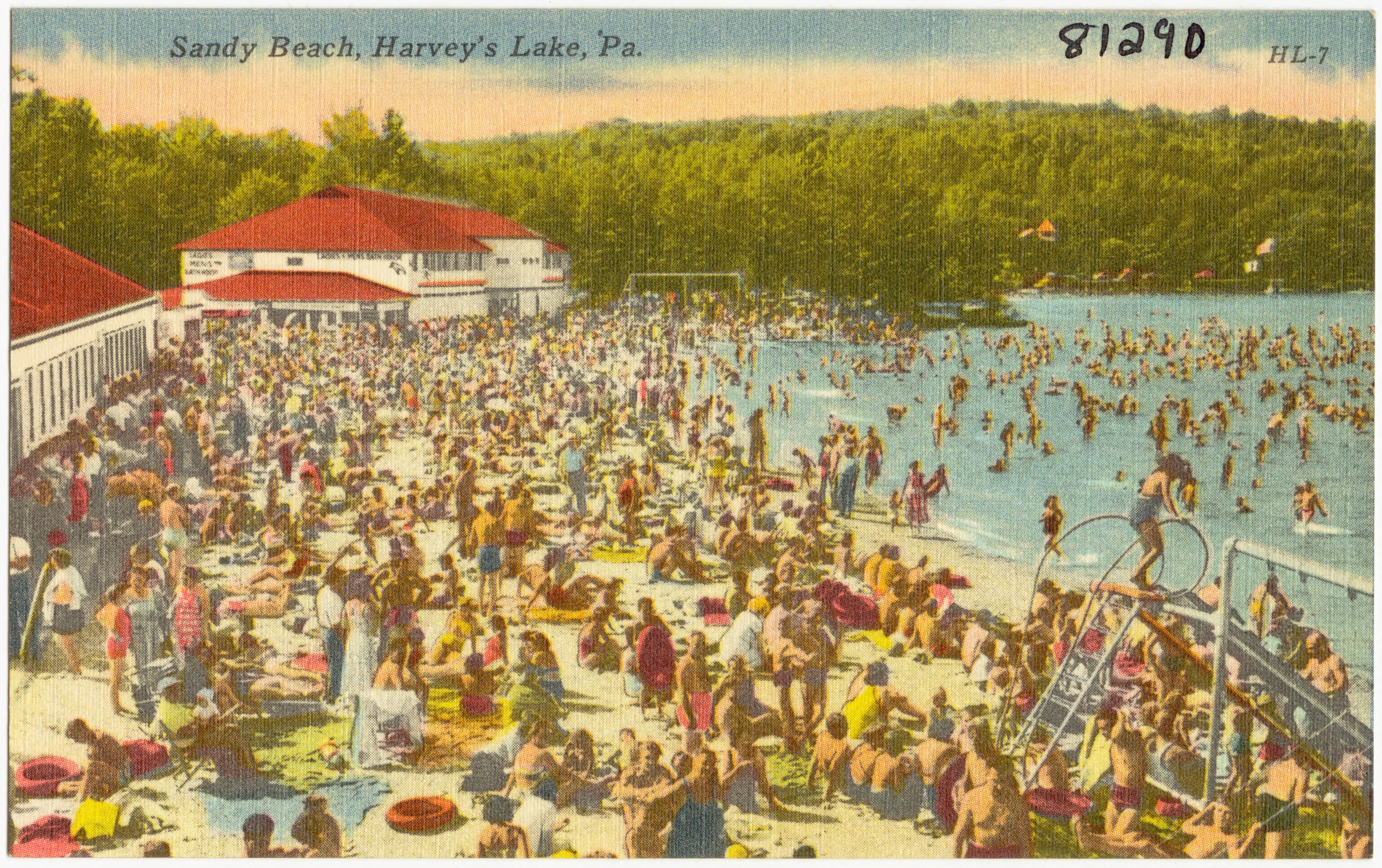
Sandy Beach, ca 1940.

== Biology ==
Harveys Lake is listed on the Luzerne County Natural Areas Inventory.

Numerous rare or endangered plant species have been observed in the vicinity of Harveys Lake. Plants in the vicinity of the lake include Vasey's pondweed, flat-leaved pondweed, grassy pondweed, broad-leaved water-milfoil, and Beck's water-marigold. However, exotic and invasive plants such as fanwort and aquatic coontail also inhabit the area and have altered the habitat in the vicinity of the lake. Second-growth forests occur in the area surrounding the lake.

Algae blooms have occurred on Harveys Lake due to high levels of nutrients in the water.

Harveys Lake is inhabited by various species of native fish of Pennsylvania. In 1972, Field and Stream noted that the lake was inhabited by rainbow trout, sockeye salmon, and some lake trout. As the basin of Harveys Creek upstream of the tributary Pikes Creek is designated as a High-Quality Coldwater Fishery, the lake itself has the same designation. Harveys Lake has regulations permitting a creel limit of three trout per day, with only one being allowed to be more than 18 inches (46 cm) long.

Various bird species have been observed in the vicinity of Harveys Lake. These include surf scoters and black scoters, which have been observed there in the winter. Although greater scaups are rare in Pennsylvania away from Lake Erie, one was observed at the lake in July 1992. Franklin's gulls have also been observed near the lake, as have snow buntings and black-legged kittiwakes, and ruddy ducks. Nine brant geese were observed on the lake in May 1997.

== See also ==
- Conneaut Lake, the largest natural lake in Pennsylvania by surface area
- Raystown Lake, the largest man made reservoir in Pennsylvania
- List of lakes in Pennsylvania
