= Fishing rights =

Fishing rights may refer to:

- Exclusive economic zone of a sovereign state within which it may control fishing
- Fishing license, providing a person with the right to fish at a specific time and place
- Indigenous land rights, which may include the right of indigenous people to fish from land not owned by them
