= CRFL =

CRFL is a four-character combination that may refer to:

- CRFL (CaReFuL mnemonic), a mnemonic for foreign learners of French regarding silent terminal letters
- Coastal Recreational Fishing License, a fishing license in North Carolina (CRFL or NC-CRFL)
- Cross Roads Football League, a sports league for American football in the Midwest (not to be confused with the Crossroads League, which does not include football)

== See also ==
- Not to be confused with CRLF, a newline (carriage return plus line feed)
