= Harveys Lake, Pennsylvania =

Borough in Pennsylvania, US

- Borough
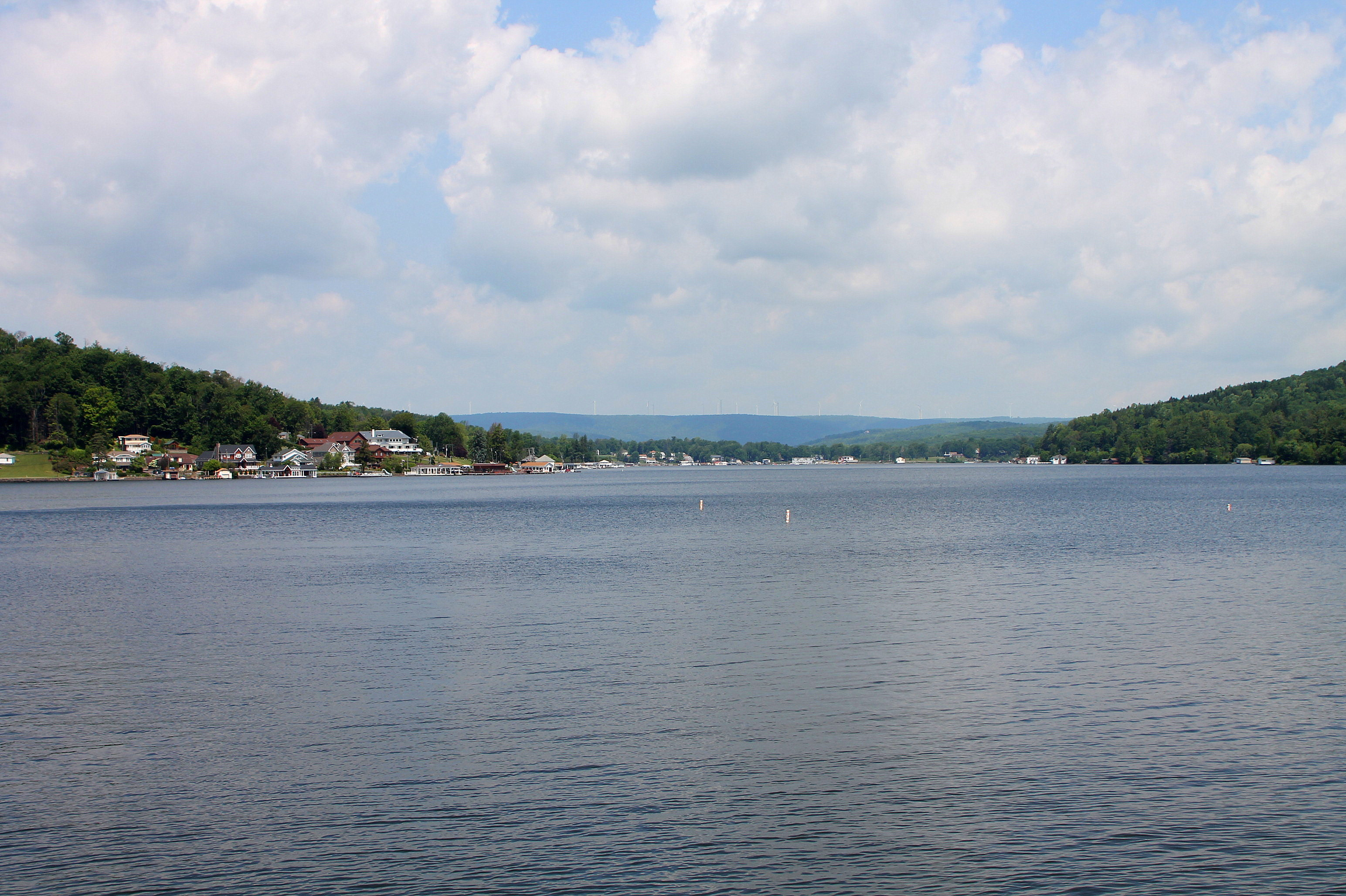
- A view of Harveys Lake from the south

- Location of Harveys Lake in Luzerne County, Pennsylvania.

- Location within Pennsylvania Location within the United States
- Coordinates: 41°21′48″N 76°02′38″W
- Country: United States
- State: Pennsylvania
- County: Luzerne
- Settled: 1781
- Incorporated: 1968

Government
  - Type: Borough Council
  - Mayor: Michael Rush

Area
  - Total: 6.42 sq mi (16.62 km^{2})
  - Land: 5.40 sq mi (13.98 km^{2})
  - Water: 1.02 sq mi (2.64 km^{2})

Population (2020)
  - Total: 2,788
  - Density: 516.7/sq mi (199.49/km^{2})
- Time zone: UTC-5 (Eastern (EST))
  - Summer (DST): UTC-4 (EDT)
- ZIP code: 18618
- Area code: 570
- FIPS code: 42-33000
- Website: harveyslakeborough.com

Harveys Lake is a borough in Luzerne County, Pennsylvania, United States. It is part of the Back Mountain, a 118 square miles (310 km^{2}) region in northern Luzerne County.

The borough is named after the lake, its principal feature, which in turn was named after Benjamin Harvey, a local settler. Harvey was a member of the Sons of Liberty, an eminent colonial-era group that fought against Great Britain's Stamp Act of 1765.

As of the 2020 census, the population of the borough of Harveys Lake was 2,786.

== History ==
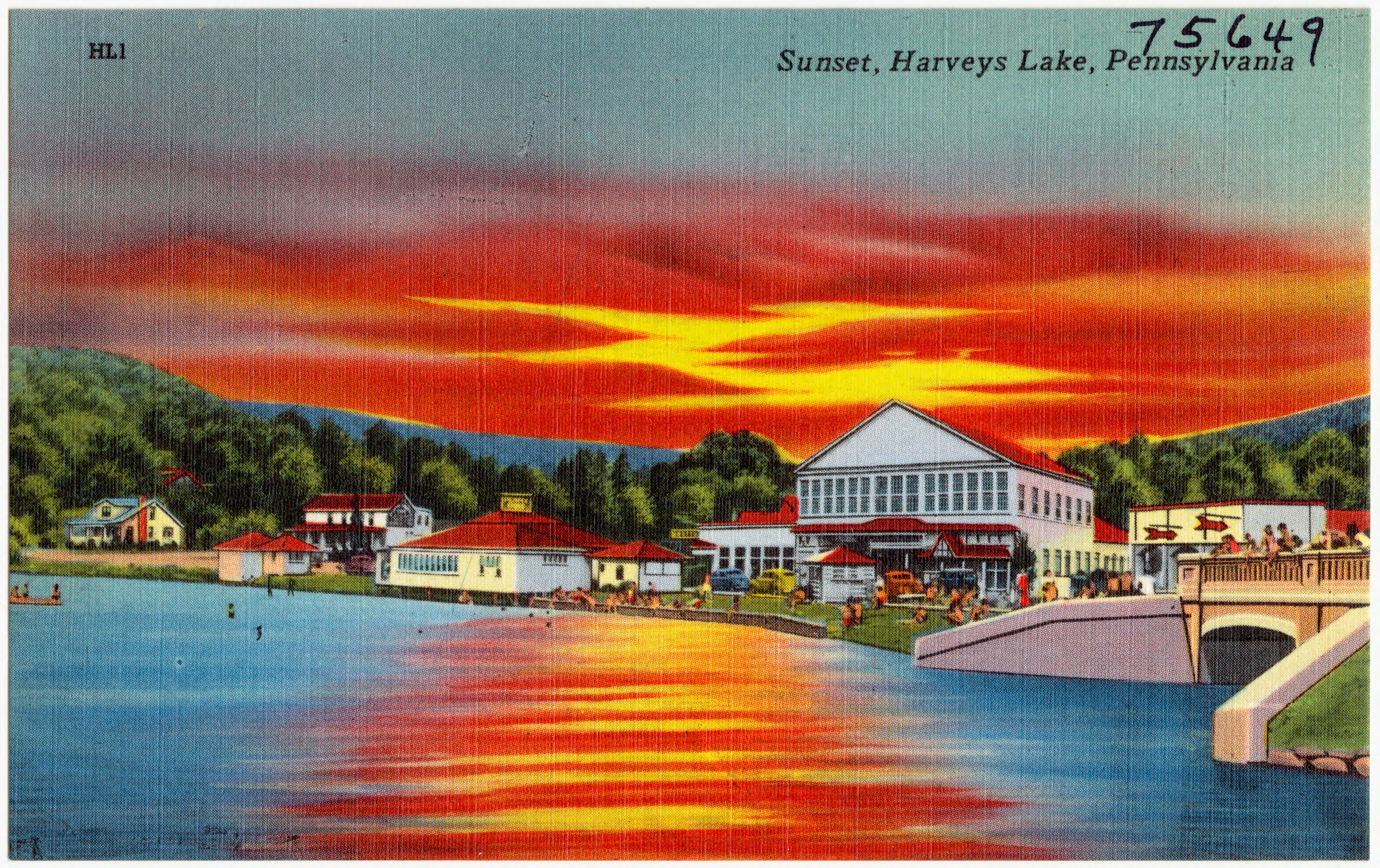
Old postcard of Harveys Lake

Harveys Lake was not officially incorporated as a borough until 1968. Prior to that, the area was an unincorporated part of Lake Township.

Historically, the first White resident in the vicinity of the lake was Matthew Scouten, who arrived in the early 1790s, but the first White settlers were the Worthingtons, who arrived in 1806.

Harveys Lake became a major resort destination in the early 20th century, attracting tourists from all over the Northeast. Hotels, cottages, boathouses, a casino, and even an amusement park were constructed around the lake. The grand Hotel Oneonta was especially prominent in the early 1900s; former United States President Theodore Roosevelt was a guest in August 1912.

From 1952 to 1956, Pennsylvania State Senator T. Newell Wood hosted the Brynfan Tyddyn Road Race around his estate in Harveys Lake. Brynfan Tyddyn is Welsh for "large farm on a hilltop" and the race consisted of 10 laps around a 3.5 mile course around the estate. The race was discontinued in 1957 after a fatal accident and officials determined the course was too dangerous and difficult for participants and spectators to reach.

== Geography ==
Harveys Lake is located at 41°21′48″N 76°2′38″W (41.363335, -76.043989).

According to the United States Census Bureau, the borough has a total area of 6.2 square miles (16.0 km^{2}), of which 5.2 square miles (13.4 km^{2}) is land and 1.0 square mile (2.6 km^{2}), or 16.45%, is water. The lake has a maximum depth of 104 feet (32 m). Pennsylvania Route 415, which encircles the lake, is a major highway in the borough. Most of the homes and businesses are located within proximity to the lake. Forested mountains are located on the outskirts of town.

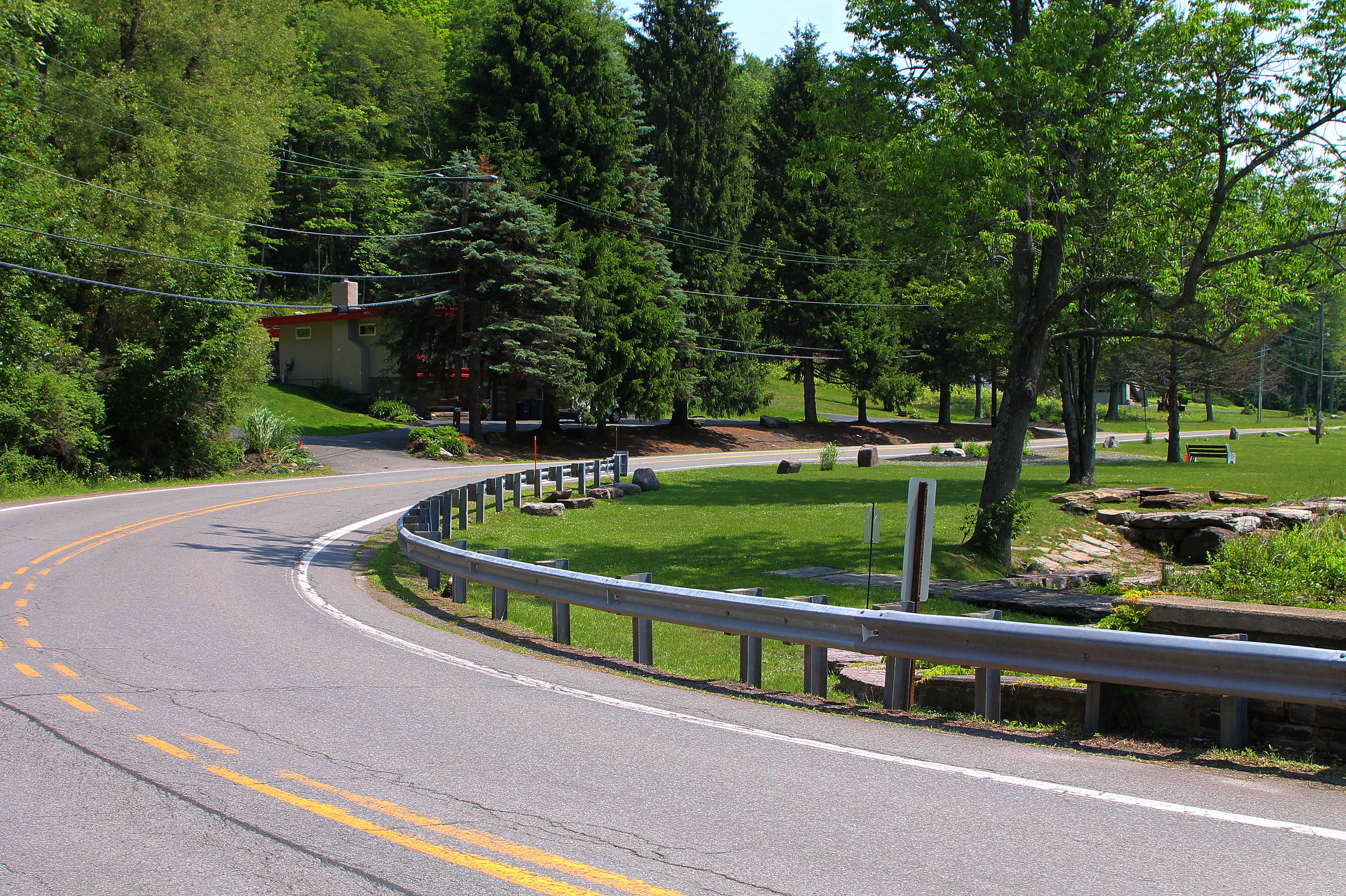
Pennsylvania Route 415 encircling Harveys Lake

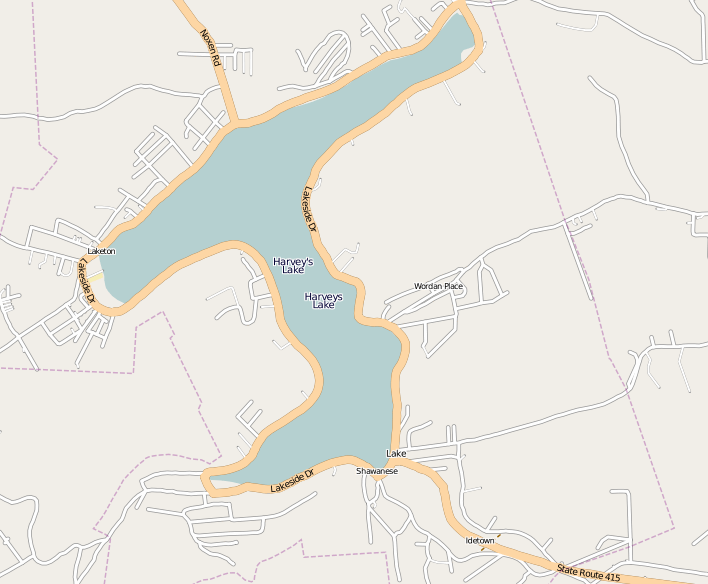
Map of Harveys Lake

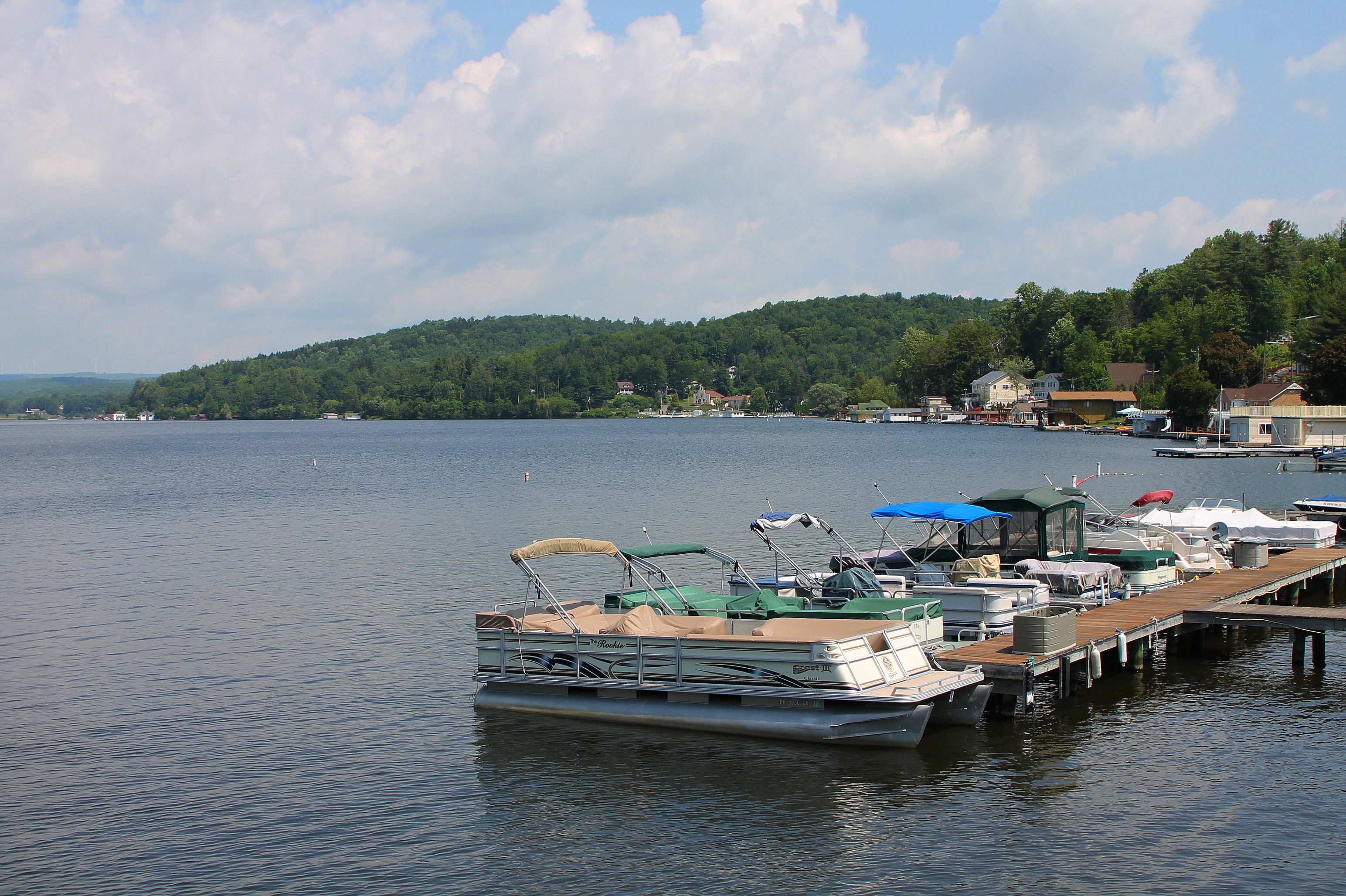
Boats on Harveys Lake

== Demographics ==
Historical population
Census	Pop.	Note	%±
1970	1,693		—
1980	2,318		36.9%
1990	2,746		18.5%
2000	2,888		5.2%
2010	2,791		−3.4%
2020	2,788		−0.1%
2021 (est.)	2,792	▲	0.1%

As of the census of 2000, there were 2,888 people, 1,185 households, and 791 families residing in the borough. The population density was 540.1 inhabitants per square mile (208.5/km^{2}). There were 1,735 housing units at an average density of 324.5 per square mile (125.3/km^{2}). The racial makeup of the borough was 98.10% White, 0.14% African American, 0.31% Native American, 0.38% Asian, 0.03% Pacific Islander, 0.31% from other races, and 0.73% from two or more races. Hispanic or Latino of any race were 0.76% of the population.

There were 1,185 households, out of which 29.6% had children under the age of 18 living with them, 53.8% were married couples living together, 8.7% had a female householder with no husband present, and 33.2% were non-families. 27.7% of all households were made up of individuals, and 8.6% had someone living alone who was 65 years of age or older. The average household size was 2.44 and the average family size was 2.97.

In the borough the population was spread out, with 22.8% under the age of 18, 7.3% from 18 to 24, 30.1% from 25 to 44, 26.8% from 45 to 64, and 13.0% who were 65 years of age or older. The median age was 39 years. For every 100 females there were 97.8 males. For every 100 females age 18 and over, there were 95.3 males.

The median income for a household in the borough was $37,656, and the median income for a family was $51,319. Males had a median income of $31,059 versus $25,528 for females. The per capita income for the borough was $22,795. About 3.0% of families and 6.7% of the population were below the poverty line, including 6.2% of those under age 18 and 6.9% of those age 65 or over.

== Education ==
The school district is Lake-Lehman School District.

== Notable people ==
- T. Newell Wood (1909-1982), Pennsylvania State Senator
