= Hunting season =

Time when it is legal to hunt and kill a particular species

A hunting season is the designated time period during which wild animals can be legally hunted in designated areas, typically issued by the formal game law of a sovereign state, which specifies the calendar dates, the time of the day and bag limits of the target animal allowed for hunting, and such rules are often enforced by conservation officers. The permitted dates within the hunting season are referred to as open season, while other unpermitted dates outside the designated hunting season are called closed season. Hunting during closed season are considered poaching and thus wrongful, and might be subjected to punishments ranging from fines to criminal sentencing.

Hunting seasons exist primarily for the purpose of sustainable wildlife management, often to avoid disrupting breeding seasons and to prevent overhunting that undermine population viability. In addition to setting dates of hunting seasons, game laws might also dictate rules on the types of hunting weapons, vehicles and methodology allowed as well as desirable ethics during open season, and violation of these restrictions are considered as unlawful as hunting during closed seasons.

In the United States, each state determines and sets its own specific dates to hunt the certain game animal, such as California, in which they designate certain zones, in which each have their own separate dates in order to legally hunt. While the United States Fish and Wildlife Service oversees the management of wildlife in the country, each state has the primary responsibility and authority over regulating the hunting of wildlife that resides within state boundaries. State wildlife agencies that issue hunting licenses are the best source of information regarding hunting seasons, areas open/closed to hunting, etc. Hunting of migratory birds such as ducks and geese is managed cooperatively by state and federal fish and wildlife agencies. Migratory waterfowl hunters must possess both a state hunting license and a Federal Migratory Bird Hunting and Conservation Stamp (Duck Stamp), and each hunter needs a Harvest Information Program number for each state in which they hunt migratory birds.

== Open season ==
Open season is the time of the year when a particular wildlife species is allowed to be hunted as per local wildlife conservation law. In the US, for example, each state creates laws and codes governing the season dates and species, established on a complex process including citizen input, a state fish and game agency or department, and often an independent game council. This process updates a game code for each state which outlines all rules and regulations including hunting seasons. In each of the 50 states, abstracts of the larger game code are then presented in the official state hunting regulations for that given year. Season dates are often timed to occur when the population is at its maximum. It avoids the peak breeding period when members of a species are particularly vulnerable, and avoids any disruption to mating, which may affect productivity.

Open seasons are determined by a multitude of factors. Those include migrating seasons, mating seasons, and birthing seasons. For migrating waterfowl, the season is determined by when the waterfowl have migrated into the area. Since waterfowl migrate south, in the United States, the seasons for waterfowl begin earlier in the Northern states and later for the southern states. For other animals such as elk, the archery hunting season is during their breeding time, making it a little easier for archers to get within ethical shooting range. The non-hunting season for elk is from late winter to early fall. During this non-hunting season the cow elk are giving birth to calves while the bull elk are preparing to grow back a new set of antlers.

Although all states control most hunting seasons and regulations, the season for migratory waterfowl is controlled by the federal government. The government provides the states with specific dates and then states have the opportunity to decide whether to use the full season length, make into sections, or overall make the season shorter in that state. Using California as an example again, it decides to use the entire length of the season that has been determined by the federal government.

== Closed season ==
Closed season is the time of the year during which hunting an animal of a given species is contrary to law. Typically, closed seasons are designed to protect a species when it is most vulnerable or, sometimes, to protect animals during their breeding season.

The closed season is timed to prevent hunting during times of peak reproductive activity, impaired flying ability during moulting (of game birds such as waterfowl), and temperature extremes, low population levels and food shortage.

A closed season is enforced by local conservation law for the conservation of the species and wildlife management; any hunting during closed season is punishable by law and termed as illegal hunting or poaching.
