= Henry Barnes-Lawrence =

The Reverend Henry Frederick Barnes-Lawrence
- Born: 11 February 1815; Surat
- Died: 29 May 1896 (aged 81); Bridlington, England
- Occupation: Anglican priest
- Known for: Ornithologist, founder of The Association for the Protection of Sea-Birds
- Spouse: Emily Lloyd
- Children: 4 sons and 1 daughter

Henry Frederick Barnes-Lawrence (1815– 1896) was an Anglican clergyman, notable as the ornithologist who founded the Association for the Protection of Sea-Birds and with others (Francis Orpen Morris; William Thomson, Archbishop of York; and Christopher Sykes, MP) generated the pressure which led to the 1869 Sea Birds Preservation Act.

== Early life ==
Barnes was born in Surat on 11 February 1815; and educated at Clare College, Cambridge.

== Church ==
He entered the Church of England and became curate at St Luke's, Chelsea then St James, Ryde. In 1849 he became Rector of Bridlington.

== Personal life ==
In 1841 he married Emily Lloyd, who was the daughter of the then Incumbent of St Dunstan-in-the-West. They had eight children: Arthur Evelyn (born 1851), Herbert Cecil (born 1852, died 1926), Ashley Lawrence (born 1854), Lionel Aubrey Walter (born 1855), Ernest Frederick (born 1857, died 1915), Ada Florence (born 1859, died 1922), Clement Henry (born 1861, died 1887) and Emily Constance (born 1864). It seems likely that Cyril Henry Frederick Barnes-Lawrence, who became Master of Britannia Royal Naval College, Dartmouth was a grandson, rather than a son, as previously stated.

== Death ==
Barnes-Lawrence died at Bridlington on 29 May 1896.
