= Bag (fishing and hunting) =

Quantity of fish caught in fishing or game killed in hunting

A bag, in the context of fishing and hunting, is a quantity of fish caught or game killed, normally given as number of animals. Laws can restrict the number of animals killed through bag limits. The term is also often used as in compound words, e.g. hunting bag scheme or bag statistics.
