= T. Newell Wood =

American politician

Member of the Pennsylvania Senate from the 20th district
- In office January 7, 1947 – November 30, 1978
- Preceded by: Adrian Jones
- Succeeded by: Frank O'Connell

Republican Whip of the Pennsylvania Senate
- In office January 7, 1975 – November 30, 1976
- Preceded by: Stanley Stroup
- Succeeded by: John Stauffer

Personal details
- Born: July 10, 1909 Harveys Lake, Pennsylvania, US
- Died: October 18, 1982 (aged 73) Harveys Lake, Pennsylvania, US

Theodore Newell Wood (July 10, 1909 – October 18, 1982) was an American politician from Pennsylvania who served as a Republican member of the Pennsylvania State Senate for the 20th district from 1947 to 1978.

== Biography ==
Wood was born in Harveys Lake, Pennsylvania. He served as a member of the Pennsylvania State Senate for the 20th district from 1947 to 1978 and for four years as Luzerne County Commissioner. He was also a businessman who worked as chairman of the board of Kingston National Bank and President of Pressed Steel Company in Wilkes-Barre, Pennsylvania.

From 1952 to 1956, Wood hosted the Brynfan Tyddyn Road Race around his estate in Pennsylvania. Brynfan Tyddyn is Welsh for "large farm on a hilltop" and the race consisted of 10 laps around a 3.5 mile course around the estate. The race was discontinued in 1957 after a fatal accident and officials determined the course was too dangerous and difficult for participants and spectators to reach.

In 1979, Wood testified at the bribery trial of U.S. Congressman Daniel Flood that $4,000 in stock given to Flood was a gift for his friendship and not a bribe to assist in the merger of banks that Wood was facilitating.

Wood died on October 18, 1982.
