= Association for the Protection of Sea-Birds =

English organization formed in 1860s

The Association for the Protection of Sea-Birds was formed in the late 1860s by The Rev. Henry Frederick Barnes-Lawrence the incumbent at Bridlington Priory to stop the practice of shooting sea birds for sport, a practice which was legislated for in the Sea Birds Preservation Act 1869. As well as promoting the society in Yorkshire Barnes-Frederick also set up a branch in Ryde where he had been a Curate.
