= Sea Birds Preservation Act 1869 =

Act of the Parliament of the United Kingdom

- Act of Parliament
- Parliament of the United Kingdom
- Long title: An Act for the Preservation of Sea Birds.
- Citation: 32 & 33 Vict. c. 17
- Introduced by: Christopher Sykes (Commons)
- Territorial extent: United Kingdom (Note: Section 8.)

Dates
- Royal assent: 24 June 1869
- Commencement: 24 June 1869 (Note: The Acts of Parliament (Commencement) Act 1793.)
- Repealed: 1 January 1881
Other legislation
Repealed by	Wild Birds Protection Act 1880

Status: Repealed

Text of statute as originally enacted

The Sea Birds Preservation Act 1869 (32 & 33 Vict. c. 17) was an act of the Parliament of the United Kingdom. It was the first act to protect wild birds in that country.

== History ==
In 1868, Professor Alfred Newton addressed the British Association for the Advancement of Science on the "On the Zoological Aspect of the Game Laws". In particular, he urged for protection of birds of prey and seabirds during the breeding season. The British Association appointed a committee to propose a close season. The committee consisted of Frank Buckland, Henry Eeles Dresser, William Bernhardt Tegetmeier and Henry Baker Tristram. James Edmund Harting was later co-opted onto the committee.

Newton's speech cited the destruction of seabirds on the Isle of Wight and Flamborough Head. Wide publicity of his speech led to public condemnation of the residents of Bridlington. Rev. Henry Frederick Barnes-Lawrence of Bridlington Priory held a meeting of local clergy and naturalists and formed the Association for the Protection of Sea-Birds. Barnes-Lawrence's Association had the support of Francis Orpen Morris, William Thomson, Archbishop of York, and local MP Christopher Sykes.

As with many animal welfare laws before 1900, the animals' safety was not the main reason for the act. Seabirds were useful to sailors to warn of land in bad weather. If a boat was in fog and the sailors could hear seabirds nearby then they would know that they were near land. If the population of seabirds declined then they would not have this early warning system.

== Provisions ==
The act was introduced by Christopher Sykes (MP), Mr Clay and Mr Ward Jackson on behalf of the Association for the Protection of Sea-Birds. It was designed to reduce the effects of shooting and egg collecting during the breeding season. It gave limited protection to "the different species of auk, bonxie, Cornish chough, coulterneb, diver, eider duck, fulmar, gannet, grebe, guillemot, gull, kittiwake, loon, marrot, merganser, murre, oyster catcher, petrel, puffin, razor bill, scout, seamew, sea parrot, sea swallow, shearwater, shelldrake, skua, smew, solan goose, tarrock, tern, tystey, willock".

== Subsequent developments ==
The whole act was repealed by section 7 of the Wild Birds Protection Act 1880 (43 & 44 Vict. c. 35), which came into force on 1 January 1881.

== See also ==
- British Association for the Advancement of Science
- British Ornithologists' Union
- Conservation biology
- Henry Eeles Dresser
- Game Act 1831
- James Edmund Harting
- Francis Orpen Morris
- Alfred Newton
- Christopher Sykes (MP)
- William Bernhardt Tegetmeier
- William Thomson, Archbishop of York
- Henry Baker Tristram

== Bibliography ==
- Barclay-Smith, Phyllis (1959): The British contribution to bird protection Ibis 101(1):pp 115–122
- Greenoak, Francesca (1979): All the Birds of the Air Andre Deutsch, London
- J. Hickling, ‘The Vera Causa of Endangered Species Legislation: Alfred Newton and the Wild Bird Preservation Acts, 1869–1894’, Journal of the History of Biology 54(2) (2021), 275–309.
