= Fishing license =

Mechanism for fishing management

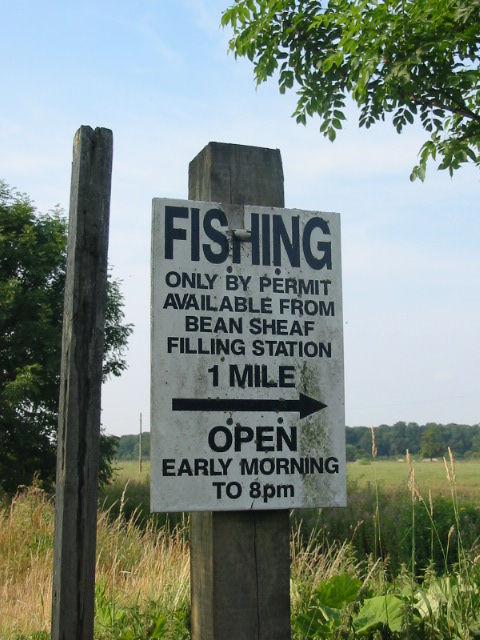
Sign in the United Kingdom alerts people to the need for a fishing permit.

New South Wales, Australia, recreational fishing fee receipt, which must be carried as proof of payment while fishing.

A fishing license (US), fishing licence (UK), or fishing permit is an administrative or legal mechanism employed by state and local governments to regulate fishing activities within their administrative areas. Licensing is one type of fisheries management commonly used in Western countries, and may be required for either commercial or recreational fishing.

== Historical licensing ==
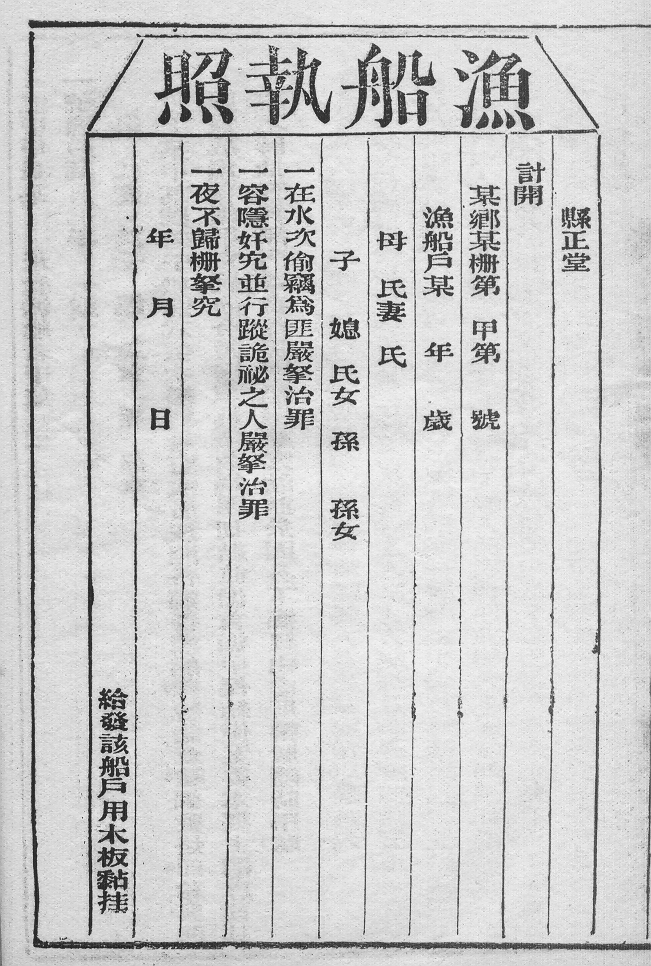
Chinese fishing license from the Qing-era, recorded in Baojiashu jiyao (保甲書輯要, 1838)

In 1765, the Chinese Qing dynasty government required all fishing boat operators to obtain a fishing license under the aojia system that regulated coastal populations. The Dan boat people of Guangdong had to acquire a fishing license as early as 1729. The wooden license issued by the government was to be displayed on the bow or stern of a boat. The information on the license consisted of the name and age of the boat's owner, the ship's status as either a fishing or commercial vessel, the home port of the boat, crew and family members on board, the date the license was issued, and the registration number of the license.

== Types by country ==
Depending on the jurisdiction, licenses or permits may be required by a government, a property owner, or both.

=== United Kingdom ===
The government requires a rod licence for anyone over the age of 12 who fishes in England, Wales or the Border Esk area in Scotland for salmon, trout, freshwater fish, smelt or eels. In addition, anyone who fishes in a non-estuarine stream, lake, or canal needs a permit from the owner of the fishing rights to the water body, which might be a local angling club, a landowner with riparian rights, or an organization such as the Canal & River Trust.

=== Ireland ===
In Ireland, rights to fish in non-tidal freshwater also are owned either by the government or by private entities such as angling club. The ownership of fishing rights in Ireland derives from the confiscation of lands by the British Crown in the 17th century; the boundaries of fishing rights areas typically follow the boundaries of estates granted by the Crown.

=== United States ===
The U.S. state of Oregon instituted a requirement for commercial fishing licenses in 1899, the same year that the state's sturgeon fishery had collapsed due to over-harvesting. Oregon began requiring recreational fishing licenses in 1901. Indiana began issuing hunting licenses in 1901 and added fishing privileges to its hunting license in 1913. The state of Pennsylvania first issued recreational fishing licenses in 1919. Licenses were required only for nonresidents, and only 50 licenses were issued that first year. In 1922, when the state first required licenses for state residents, over 2,700 nonresident licenses and over 200,000 resident licenses were sold.

In the modern system, recreational fishing licenses are issued by each state's fish and wildlife agency, and fees differ for residents and nonresidents. License revenue is a primary funding source for state fisheries management, supplemented by the federal Sport Fish Restoration program, which distributes fishing-tackle excise tax revenue to state agencies.

== License-free fishing ==
Some countries do not require a license for recreational sea fishing, provided that certain rules in regard to fish size, numbers, and total catch are followed.

=== Belgium ===
Recreational fishing in the sea does not require a license in certain spots in Belgium. Size limits need to be followed. Also need to have a freshwater permit when fishing on certain seadocks

=== Cyprus ===
Sea angling and spearfishing without diving equipment are allowed in Cyprus without needing a licence. Multiple species including seals, dolphins and turtles are however protected.

=== Estonia ===
Estonians have a life-long right to fish with one simple handline in waters owned by the state and local governments, provided that regulations about species, sizes and seasons are followed.

=== New Zealand ===
No licence is necessary for recreational sea fishing in New Zealand. There are many detailed regulations about fish species, size limits, fishing methods and prohibited areas. But when fishing inland in creeks, rivers or lakes a fishing licence is needed.

In New Zealand, freshwater anglers are generally required to hold two types of fishing licences. A licence from DOC is required for fishing in the Taupō catchment, while a separate licence from Fish & Game New Zealand covers most other freshwater locations across the country.

Certain rivers and lakes are designated waters requiring additional permits, known as Designated Water Licences, issued by regional Fish & Game councils. These may impose specific restrictions such as method, catch limits, or seasonal closures to protect fish populations.

=== Norway ===
Sea fishing from the coast and from the boat is free for both residents and visitors in Norway, although there are minimum fish rules and other regulations.

=== Sweden ===
For fishing in Swedish public coastal waters (Baltic Sea and the west coast), no license is necessary. Foreign citizens are also allowed to fish in these waters without a license, but only with handheld gear. License-free fishing is legal along the sea coast (in many cases also on private land along the coast) and in Sweden's five largest lakes – Vänern, Vättern, Hjälmaren, Mälaren and Storsjön. In the rest of the country, fishing without a license is not permitted and several thousand fishing areas exist, each with their individual fishing permits and local regulations. Fishing permits are available in most of Sweden's fresh waters, but not all.

=== United Kingdom ===
Fishing licence for sea fishing is not required in most of the places in the United Kingdom. For salmon and sea trout, game licence is required regardless of location. In places where saltwater and freshwater cross over the regulations are complicated and licence may be required.

=== Vietnam ===
In Vietnam, individuals engaged in small-scale recreational fishing, using no vessel or a vessel shorter than six meters in length, do not require a license. Fishing vessels of six meters or more, or operating in designated waters, require a license.

== See also ==
- Slot limit
- Hunting license
