= Slot limit =

Tool used by fisheries

A slot limit is a tool used by fisheries managers to regulate the size of fish that can legally be harvested from particular bodies of water. Usually set by state fish and game departments, the protected slot limit prohibits the harvest of fish where the lengths, measured from the snout to the end of the tail, fall within the protected interval. For example, on a body of water where there is a protected slot limit on largemouth bass between 12 and 16 inches (30 and 41 cm), largemouth between those lengths may not be harvested. In this example largemouth bass shorter than 12 inches (30 cm) and longer than 16 inches (41 cm) may be removed from the water and kept for personal use in accordance with local fishing regulations.

Slot limits are based on the principle that bass populations exhibit different habitat requirements during different phases of their lives. Slot limits focus on protecting one segment of the life history which can influence overall fishing success.

A minimum landing size is a similar regulation in commercial fishing.

"Slot" may also refer to a fish within the size limits one can keep. For example, a "slot Red Drum" measuring between 18"-27" may be kept, but anything below may not be harvested, and any fish over 27" may only be harvested with a red drum tag

== Purpose ==
Generally, the purpose behind the implementation of protected slot limits is to improve the angling opportunities in a particular body or bodies of water. Protected slot limits are most often used to regulate the harvest from waters where natural reproduction of the concerned fish species occurs. The protected slot limit is set in such a way that it protects the size of those fish deemed most important to the species spawning success in that fishery. With the size of the most sexually productive fish protected from harvest it is likely that an increased number will spawn during a given year and hence lead to more naturally produced individuals. The effort to increase the number of fish through natural reproduction mitigates the need for artificial stocking of a species to provide for a viable recreational fishery.

In addition to improving natural reproduction success the protected slot limit can also serve to improve the average catchable size of a protected species. This is of particular concern in recreational fisheries where the practice of catch and release is not prevalent. The slot limit protects those fish that evade harvest until their size exceeds that of the lower end of the protected slot. They are then protected from harvest until they exceed the maximum size within the protected slot. Fish within this size range are protected from harvest during the time when their size would make them desirable by anglers. In such a scenario the protection of large numbers of medium-sized fish translates into a higher success rate of those that exceed the slot limit. Hence, the protected slot limit increases the amount of fish that reach the large sizes sought by sport anglers. This model assumes that the lake or stream in question contains a forage base suitable to support fish of this size.

== Challenges ==
The issue of protected slot limits, in some cases, is marked in controversy. The protected slot limit and the angler's desire to harvest fish can be in conflict. The main challenge lies in the economic, ecological, and social factors that fisheries managers must consider when implementing harvest regulations such as protected slot limits. Take, for example, the situation involving Lake Mille Lacs in central Minnesota. Anglers spend millions of dollars and travel countless miles to fish for Lake Mille Lacs walleye (Sander vitreus) which is highly sought after for its table fare as well as its sporting qualities. In the case of Lake Mille Lacs there has long been a protected slot limit for walleye.

In 2002, the slot limit was from 20 to 28 inches (51 to 71 cm). At the time, state fishing regulations stated that on Lake Mille Lacs an angler could keep four walleyes with only one walleye over 28 inches (71 cm) allowed, and all walleyes within the protected slot limit of 20 to 28 inches (51 to 71 cm) must be immediately released. The protected slot limit worked so well, in a sense, that anglers soon found it difficult to catch harvestable sizes of walleye and they were catching an overabundance of slot-sized fish. Many anglers have become frustrated by the lack of "eater" sized walleye. The intense protection of this size class of fish caused a sharp decline in the natural available forage base for walleyes. The result was a large number of unhealthy and underweight slot-sized walleyes in the fishery. This case represents an exception to the outcomes common to the implementation of protected slot limits. However, it does illustrate the objectives fisheries managers must consider when devising protected slot limits. Managers must balance the health of the fishery, trophy fish potential, and desired angler harvest.

== Ways to protect fish populations ==
When an angler is fishing, he or she must measure the fish caught to make sure it meets the state's wildlife and fisheries requirements. Every state has their own limits for fish that are native to their ecosystems. If the fish meets the requirements then the angler is allowed to keep the fish, but can only keep a certain amount of fish of that species. Besides a slot limit there are other ways and limits that officials can use to protect a fish population.

1. Minimum size limits- important when higher levels of reproduction are required.
2. Creel limits- used to prevent the harvest of too many fish at once, allowing more fish to reach larger sizes. Guist Creek Lake is an example of a lake that has decided a creel limit was necessary for their native fish species.
3. Closed seasons- used to help protect fish during their spawning seasons. If a given area puts a closed season into action an angler is not allowed to fish this area during specified times of the year.

== Mode of action ==
As a largemouth bass grows they must reach a certain size to enter the reproductive stage. These fish reproduce with more frequency during a certain age and weight in their lifespan.

The desired slot limit for largemouth bass

Before a slot limit can be put into action, four things must be taken into consideration in order to make sure no harm is done to the ecosystem:

=== Growth rate ===
Growth rate can be defined as how long it takes for a fish to reach a given size. Even though growth rate differs from lake to lake, an average largemouth bass can grow up to three pounds (1.4 kg) in less than three years, which is considered rapid growth.

=== Recruitment ===
Recruitment is defined as the number of young fish that live to adulthood. Lakes with 20 to 40% coverage of aquatic plants usually have high bass recruitment, whereas lakes with little shoreline cover often have low to intermediate recruitment. If a lake has a high recruitment, this is a good situation for a state to use the slot limit because it will help control the number of small fish in a population. When the recruitment is low, this is where a state would use the minimum-size limit to control the fish population.

=== Mortality ===
Mortality rate is the percent of fish in a given lake that die. To find the true mortality rate of a lake, officials must divide the number of fish harvested plus fish killed from hooks, then divide that number by the number of fish that die each year.

=== Measurements ===
After the growth rate, recruitment rate, and mortality rate have been determined, if all three factors are met, the correct measurements must be chosen to insure that no harm is done to the surrounding ecosystem. If a slot limit is used correctly, not only will the a fish population benefit from this; but the surrounding ecosystem potentially could gain some benefits from a slot limit.

== Benefits ==
Slot limits can be very beneficial to fish species along with their ecosystem. One benefit from slot limits is that it reduces the amount of competitive pressure between fish the same size. Not only will it reduce competition, but it will also result in a healthier fish population since the slot limit does not allow anglers to keep fish that produce the most eggs during their spawning season. Since the fish are healthier and larger, this will bring more jobs and tourists to a town, which will cause the city's revenue to rise.

== Example of a slot limit ==
The Lake Fork Reservoir in Texas is known for its largemouth bass. A slot limit was introduced in the early 1900s in hopes of bettering the chances of catching a trophy bass. The regulations are:

1. Largemouth bass are subject to a 16-to-24-inch (41 to 61 cm) slot limit.
2. Bass 16 inches (41 cm) and shorter and 24 inches (61 cm) and longer can be harvested.
3. Daily bag limit of five fish
4. One fish can be 24 inches (61 cm) or longer.

== See also ==
- Minimum landing size
- Bag limits
- Fisheries-induced evolution
