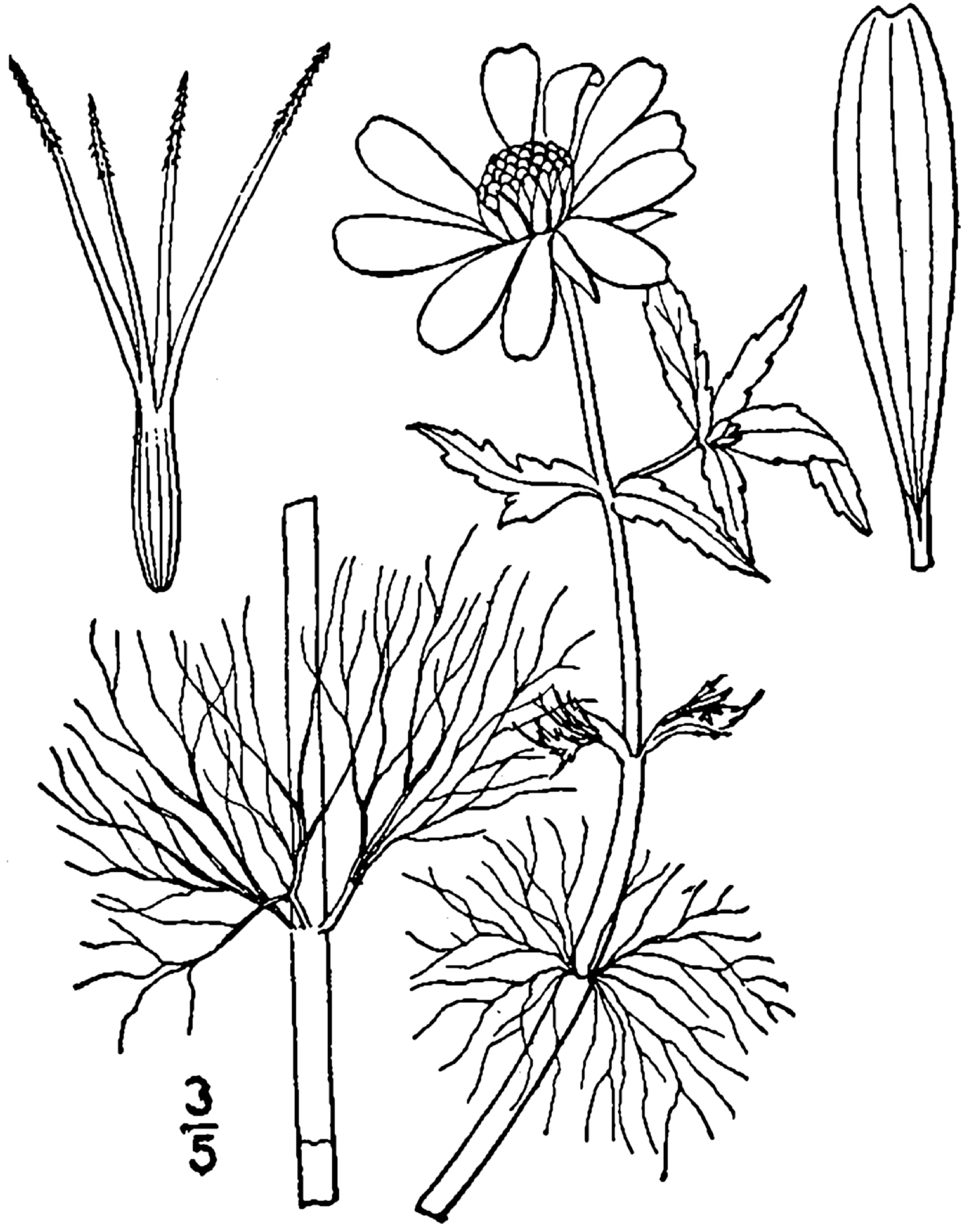
- 1913 illustration

Scientific classification
- Kingdom: Plantae
- Clade: Tracheophytes
- Clade: Angiosperms
- Clade: Eudicots
- Clade: Asterids
- Order: Asterales
- Family: Asteraceae
- Genus: Bidens
- Species: B. beckii

Binomial name
- Bidens beckii Torr. ex Spreng.
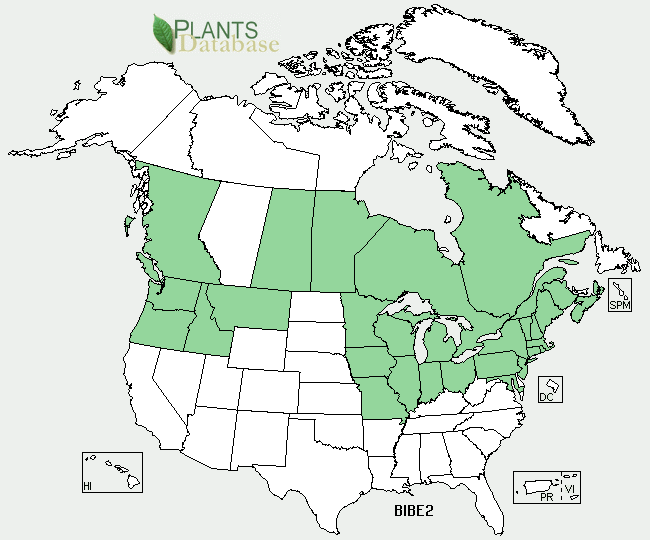
- Range within North America

Synonyms
- Megalodonta beckii (Torr. ex Spreng.) Greene

= Bidens beckii =

Species of plant

Bidens beckii, commonly called Beck's water-marigold or simply water marigold is a species of flowering plant in the family Asteraceae. It is native to Canada and the northern United States.

== Description ==
Bidens beckii is a perennial herb sometimes as much as to 200 cm (80 inches) tall; it grows emerging from stagnant or slow-moving water, the submerged leaves are finely filiform-dissected. The stem typically arises 15 cm above the water and its leaves are simple, oppositely arranged, lanceolate to ovate and serrated and borne directly from the stem with no petiole. It produces numerous yellow flower heads containing (10-30) disc florets and (8) ray florets in late summer. The flowers are solitary at the end of the stem and 2–2.5 cm in diameter. Below the flower there are 5-8 hairless bracts which are about half as long as the petals.

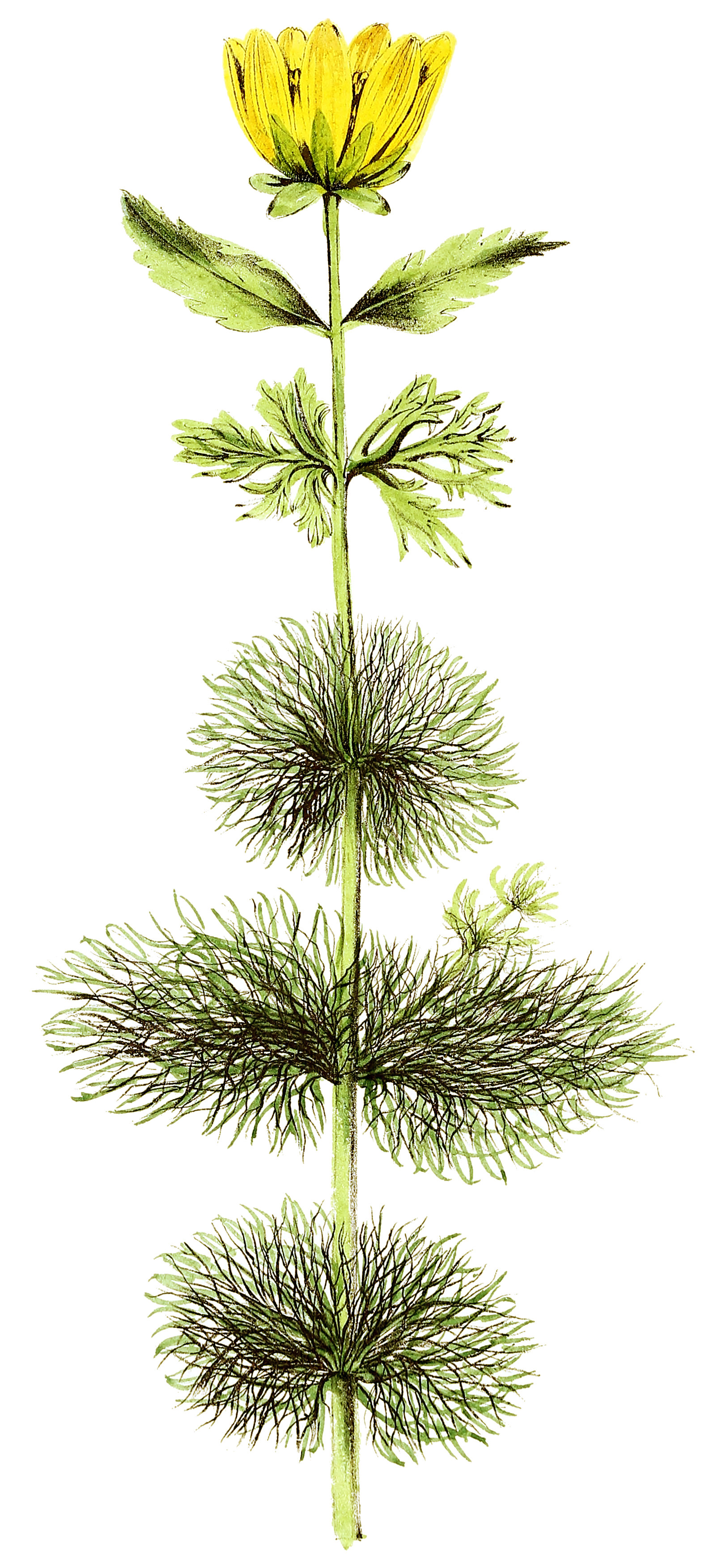
Rural Hours - Beck's Bidens
