= Bag limits =

Law restriction

A bag limit is a law imposed on hunters and fishermen restricting the number of animals within a specific species or group of species they may kill and keep. Size limits and hunting seasons sometimes accompany bag limits which place restrictions on the size of those animals and the time of year during which hunters may legally kill them. Those who violate these laws or other hunting laws are known as poachers.

In most cases, bag limits serve to keep a healthy population for the carrying capacity of the species' environment. This is done by utilizing hunters and fishermen, to harvest only a selected number of the mature game species. These bag limits are utilized by a multitude of Countries and Fish and Game enforcement agencies. Although like all law and regulation enforcement agencies, poorer regions of the world have limited ability to enforce these regulations.

== Examples ==
=== Florida bass fishing ===
In southern Florida, licensed fishermen may keep no more than five largemouth bass per day, per license and only one may be longer than 14 inches (36 cm). Also, licensed fishermen in any part of Florida may keep a maximum of two peacock bass per day, per license and only one may be longer than 17 inches (43 cm). There are no seasonal restrictions for either of these fish.

The penalty for first-time offenders is a fine of up to $500 and/or a maximum of 60 days imprisonment at the discretion of the court. Repeat offenders receive progressively harsher penalties.

=== Alligator hunting ===
Florida

American Alligator hunters with the proper permit may kill and keep two non-hatchling alligators per day, per permit, and each must be longer than 18 inches (46 cm). Also, all hunters must observe the legal alligator harvesting season which usually starts on September 1 in Florida. The length of the legal season can vary depending on state officials. The 2006 season lasted 11 weeks.

Louisiana

Alligator hunting seasons starts on the first Wednesday in September and lasts for 30 days. The amount of bagged alligators depends on the area hunted: the Louisiana Department of Wildlife and Fisheries issues harvest tags for property containing sufficient alligator habitat capable of sustaining an alligator harvest.

Texas

Alligator hunting season is from April 1 - June 30; one alligator per bag per tag per person (core counties) or one alligator per person per season (non-core counties).

== Countries with no bag limits ==
=== United Kingdom ===
There are no bag limits in the United Kingdom where some shooting estates offer bags of several hundred artificially reared and released birds per day. This is because, in the UK, game is deemed to belong to the landowner.

=== Japan ===
On the island of Hokkaido, due to the extermination of wolves and a ban on deer hunting in 1980, deer population exploded in recent years and is causing major damage to farms and environment. To counter this on Hokkaido, hunters have no bag limit.

== See also ==
- Slot limit
- Hunting license
- Wildlife management
