= Bhuva =

Bhuva (Gujarati: ભુવા) is a Gujarati surname. Notable people with the surname include:

- Chahhyaben Bhuva, Indian politician
- Mansukh Bhuva, Indian politician
