= Plague in Surat: Crisis in Urban Governance =

1996 book

- Author: Archana Ghosh and S. Sami Ahmad
- Publisher: Institute of Social Sciences
- Publication date: 1996
- Publication place: India

"Plague in Surat: Crisis in Urban Governance" is a book published in 1996, by Archana Ghosh and S. Sami Ahmad, based on a plague outbreak in 1994 after a flood in Surat, India.

== Publication ==
Plague in Surat: Crisis in Urban Governance was first published in 1996, by Institute of Social Sciences, New Delhi

== See also ==
- Surat
