= Surat Municipal Institute of Medical Education and Research =

Medical college in Surat, Gujarat

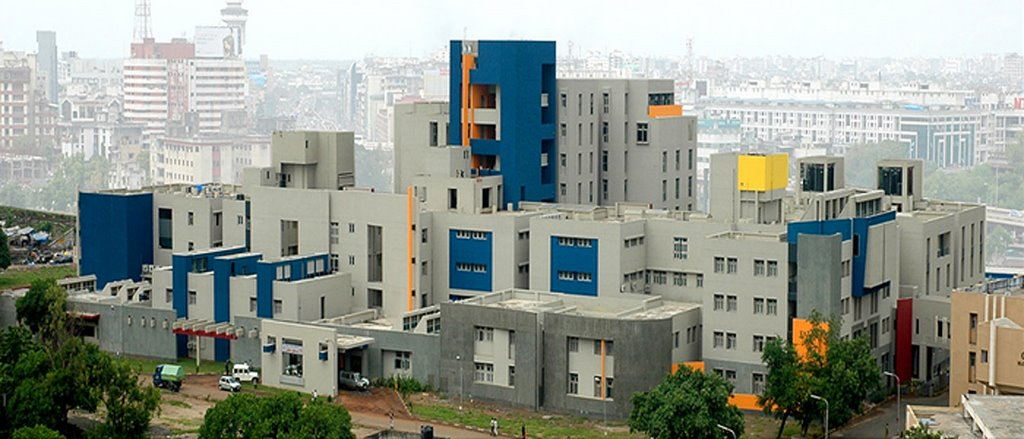
- Photographed in 2014
- Type: Municipal medical college
- Established: 2000; 26 years ago
- Parent institution: Veer Narmad South Gujarat University (VNSGU)
- Location: Surat, Gujarat, India
- Campus: Urban
- Website: smimer.suratmunicipal.gov.in
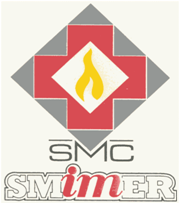

Surat Municipal Institute of Medical Education and Research (SMIMER) is a medical college and teaching hospital in Surat, Gujarat, India, which is the fourth-fastest-growing city in the world. It was established in 2000 and has been affiliated to the Veer Narmad South Gujarat University. The institute is spread over a floor area of 18,427 square metres (198,350 sq ft) for the medical college, and 75,217 square metres (809,630 sq ft) for the hospital section. It was developed with a total expenditure of Rs. 484.29 million by the Surat Municipal Corporation.

The college has its own hospital located next to the medical college complex with 500 beds, out of which 90% are free beds and 10% are paying beds in the special wards. Dr. Vandana Desai is the Administrative Medical Superintendent. The casualty department i.e. emergency medicine or trauma center is available 24 hours a day and an average of 100–125 patients are treated every day. The hospital is a non-profit organisation run by Surat Municipal Corporation.

== Rankings ==
In 2013, Surat Municipal Institute of Medical Education and Research (SMIMER) was ranked as the 8th-best emerging medical college in India in the annual survey – "India's Best Colleges" conducted by India Today and Nielsen Company.
