= Surat =

City in Gujarat, India

- Metropolis
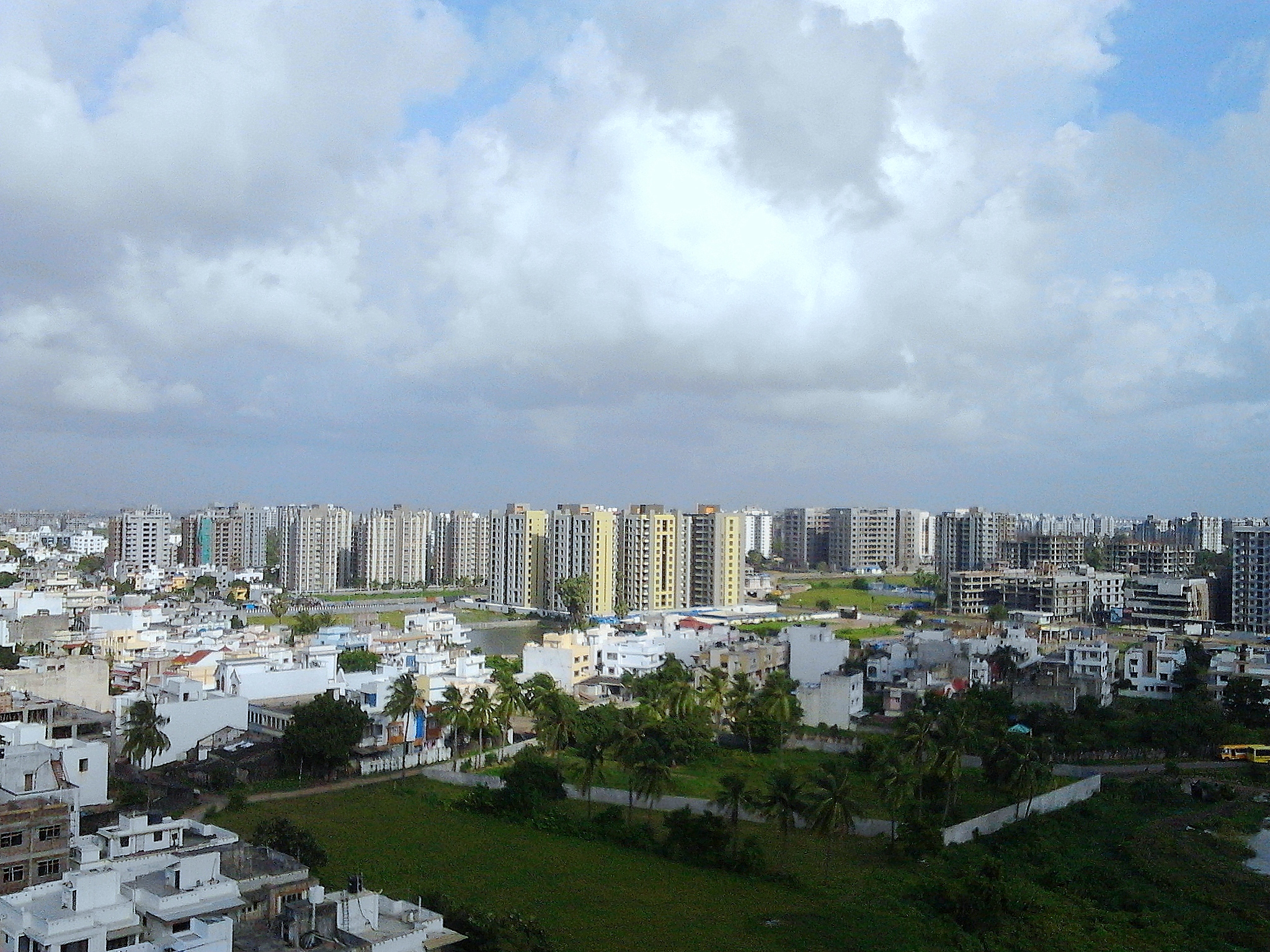
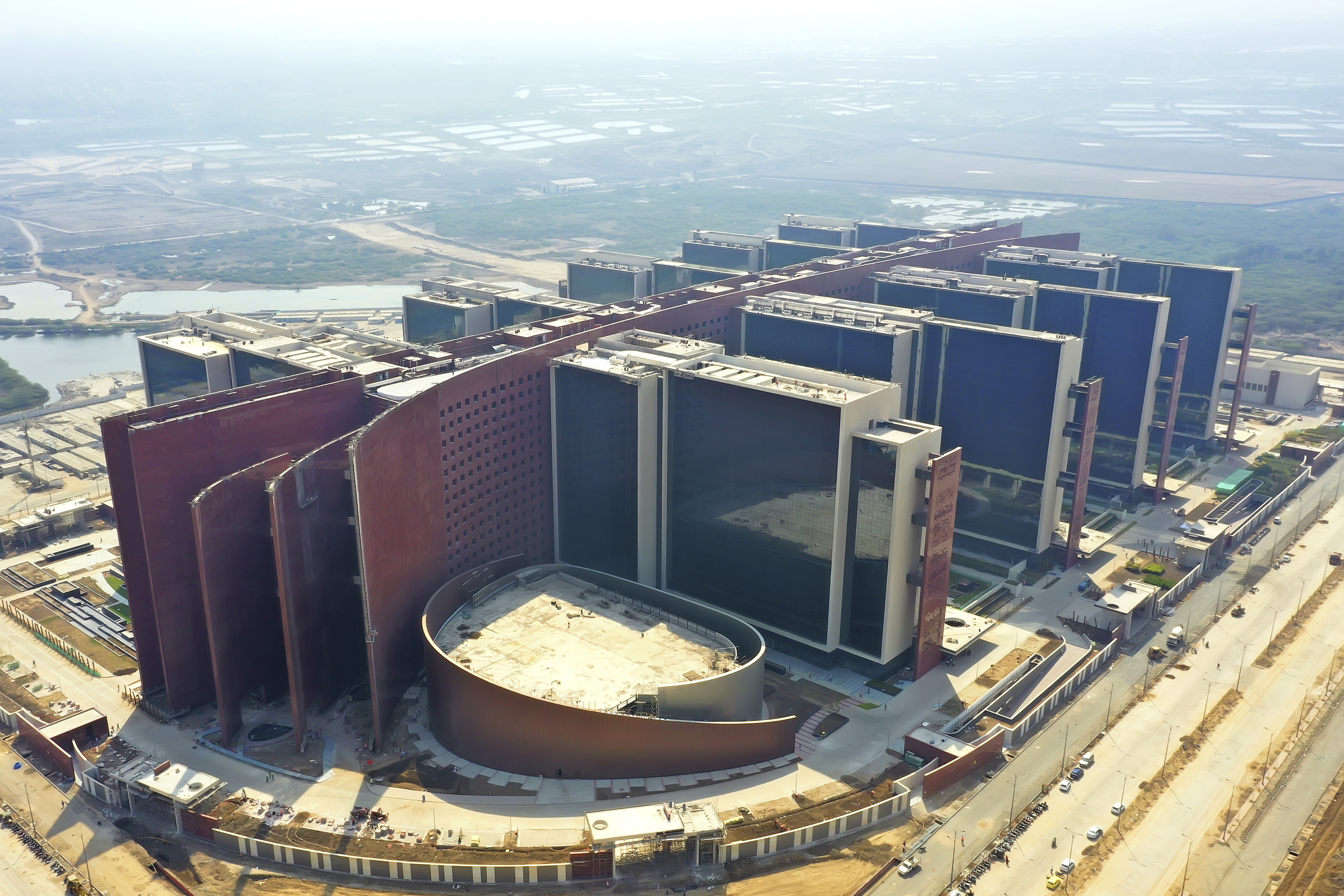
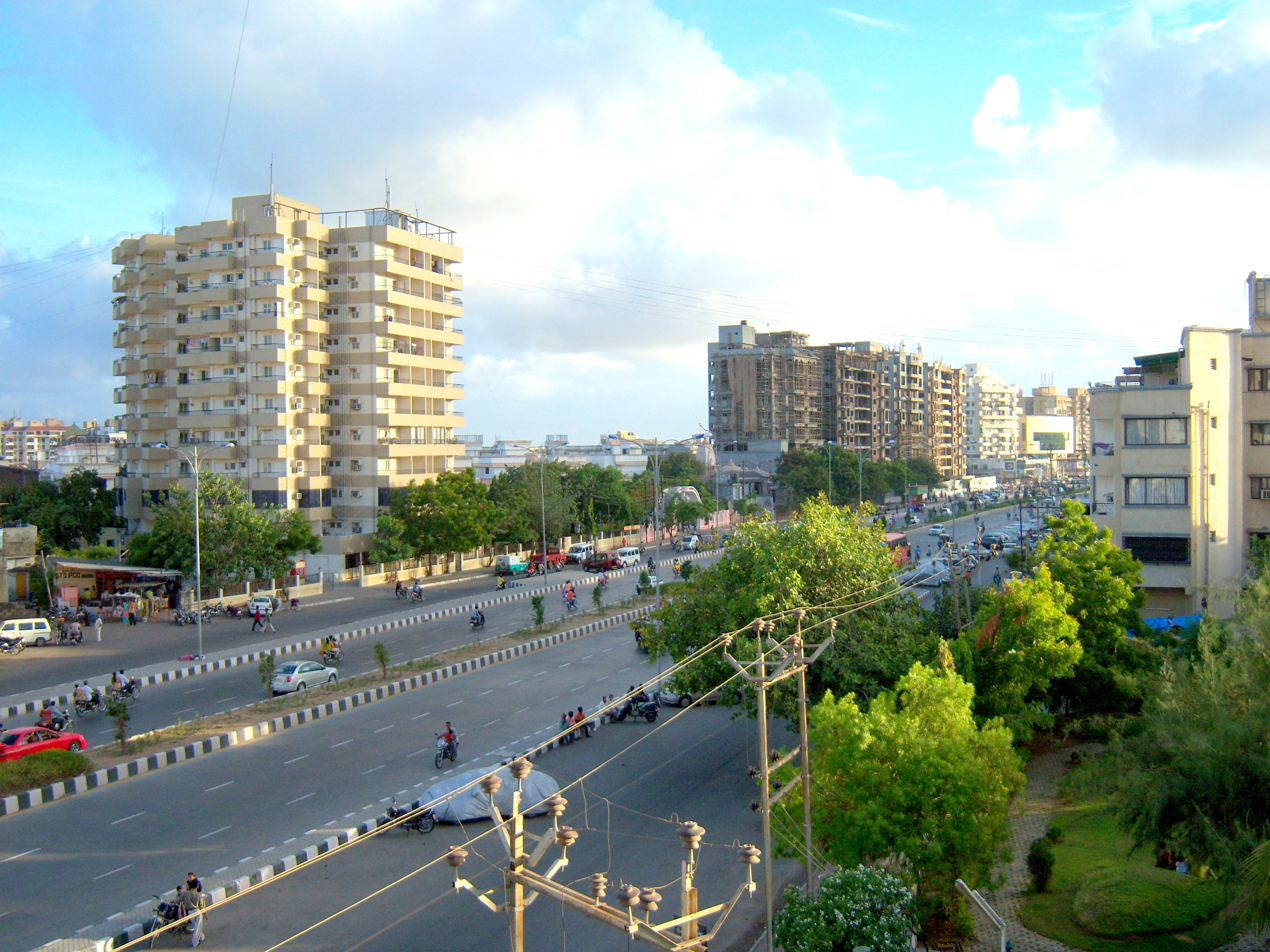
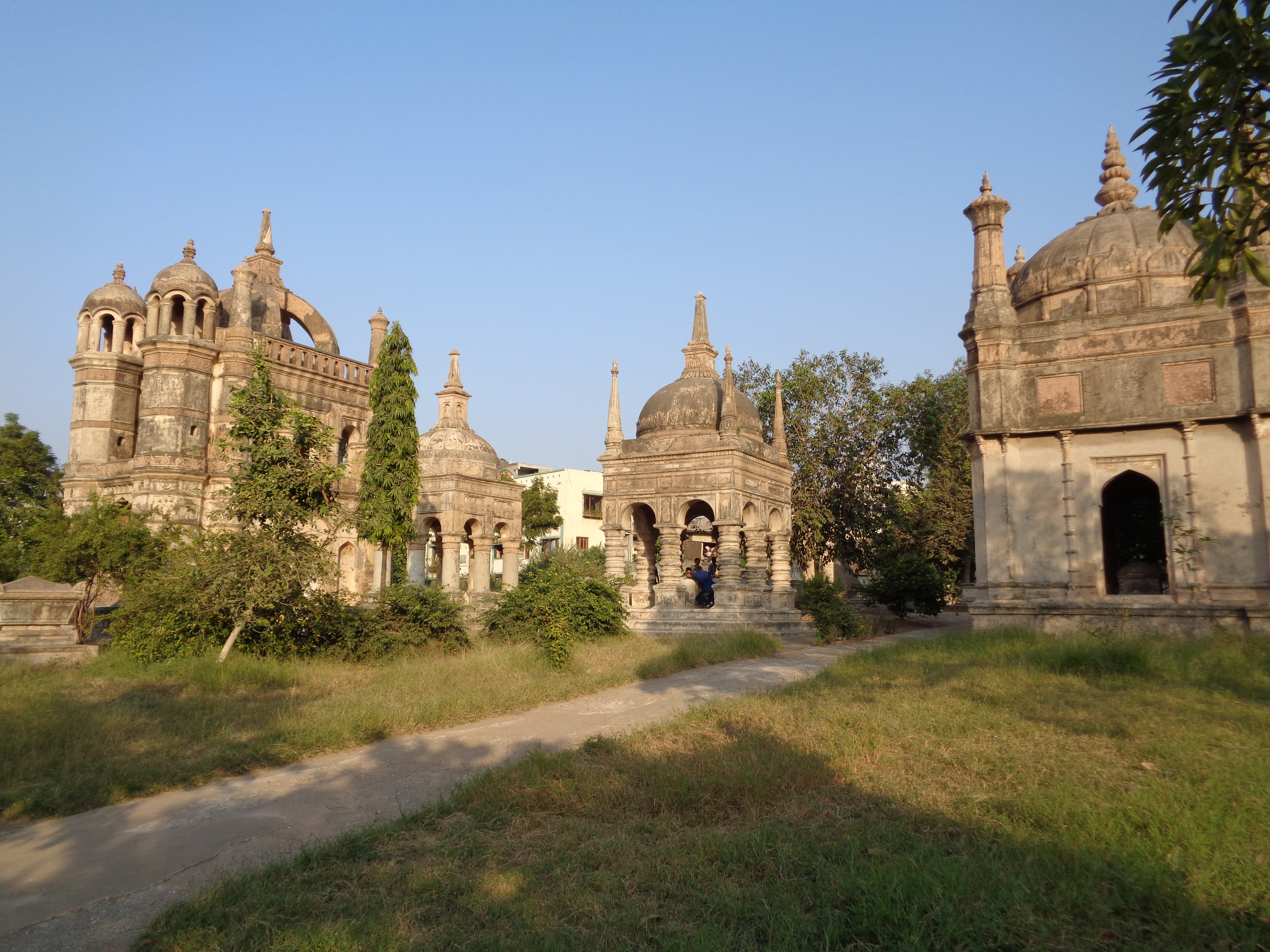
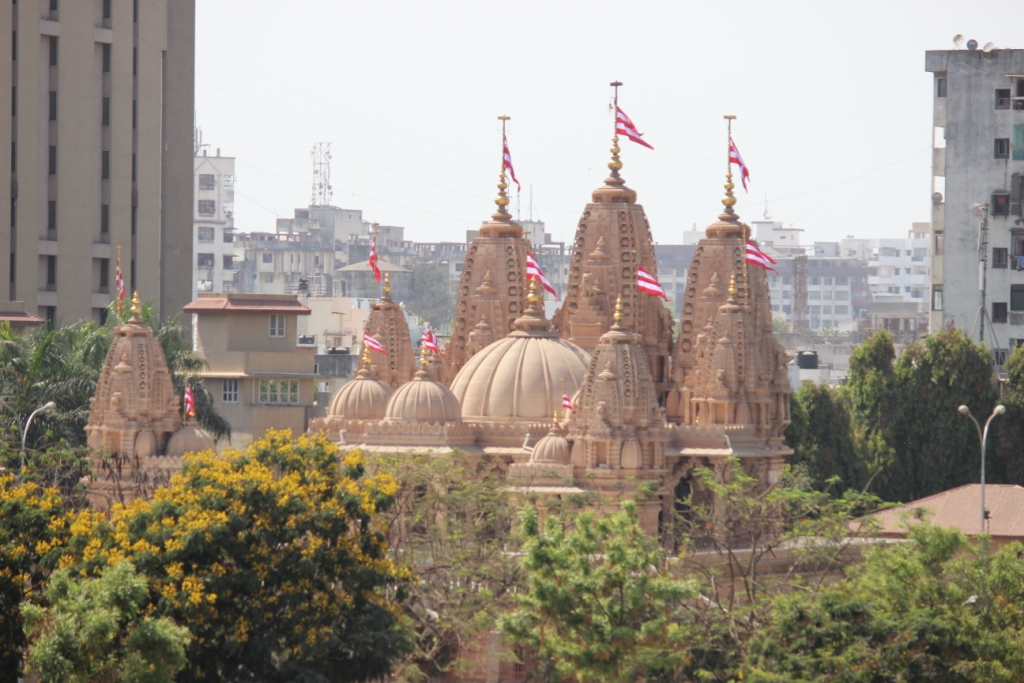
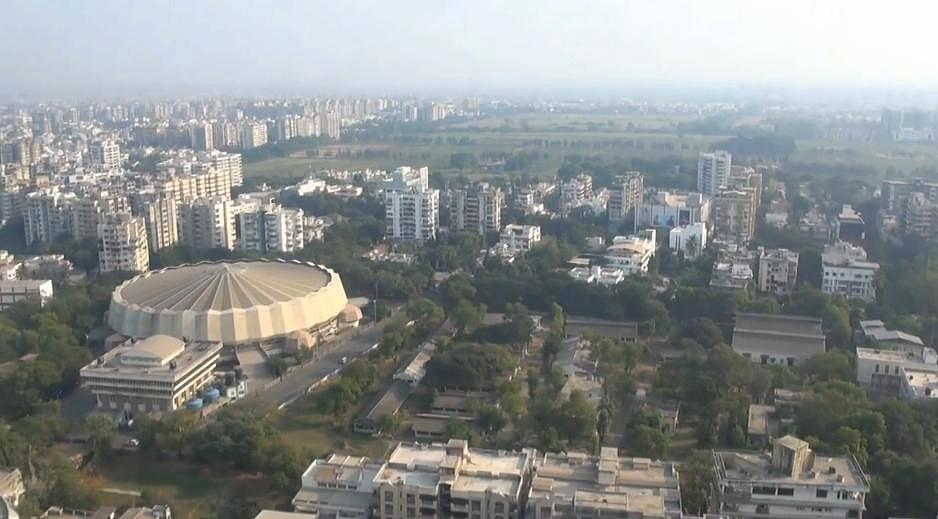
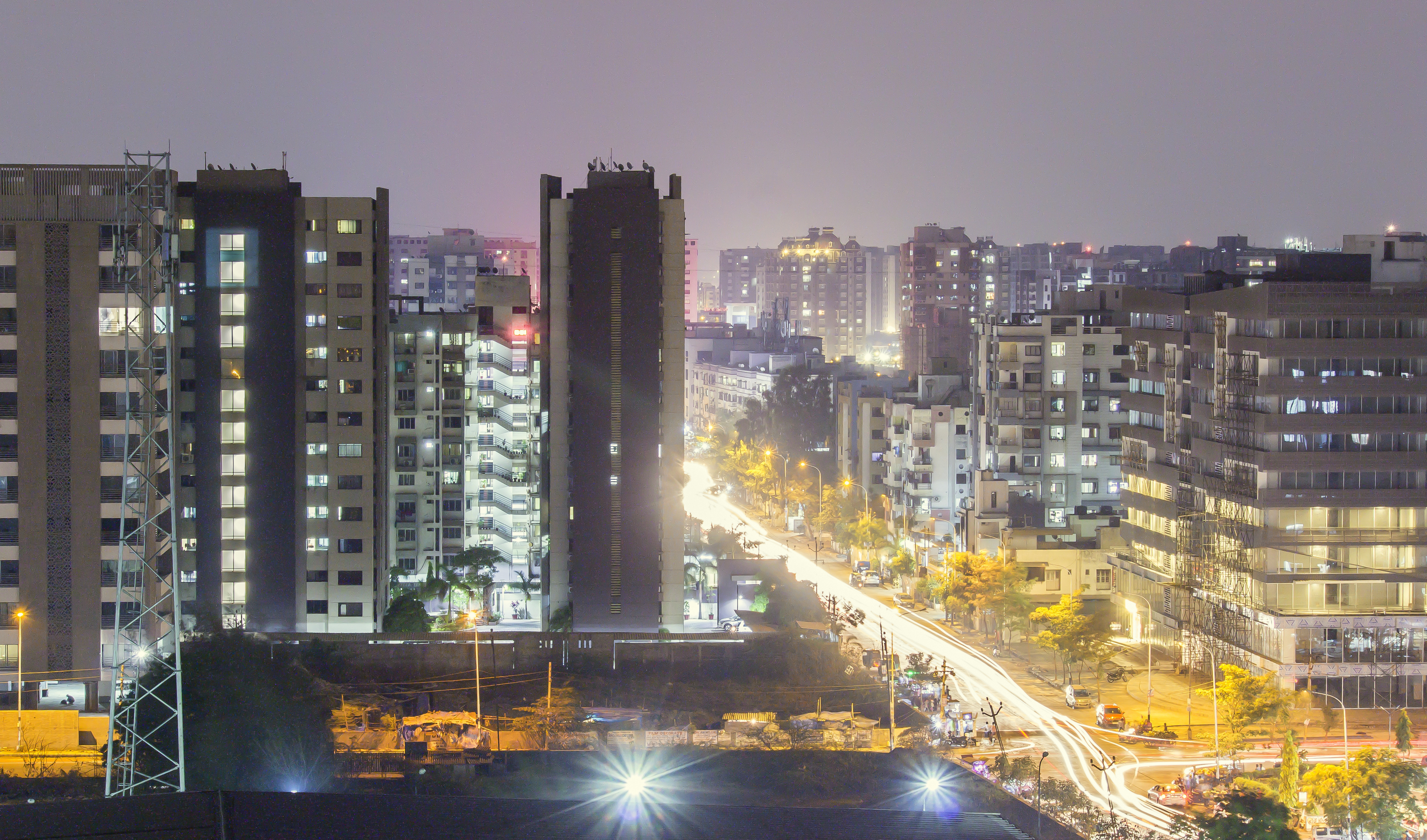
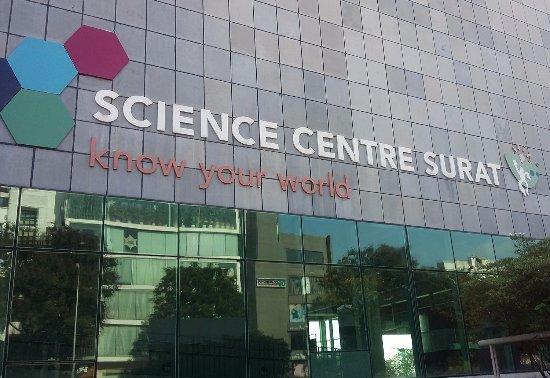
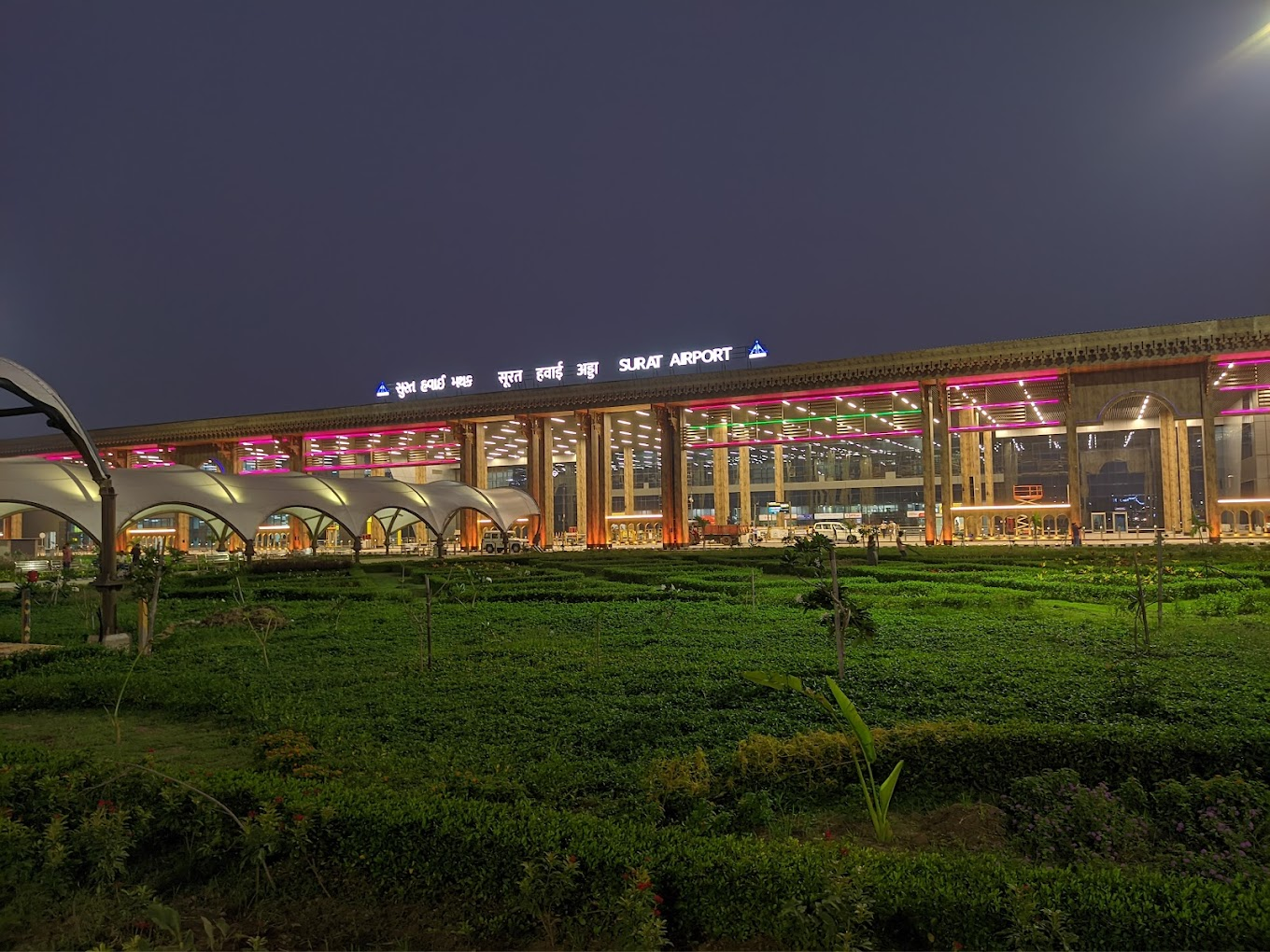
- From top: Skyline across the Tapi River, Surat Diamond Bourse, Gaurav Path, British Cemetery of Surat, Swaminarayan Mandir, Pandit Deendayal Upadhyay Indoor Stadium, Vesu Skyline, Surat Science Centre, Surat Airport

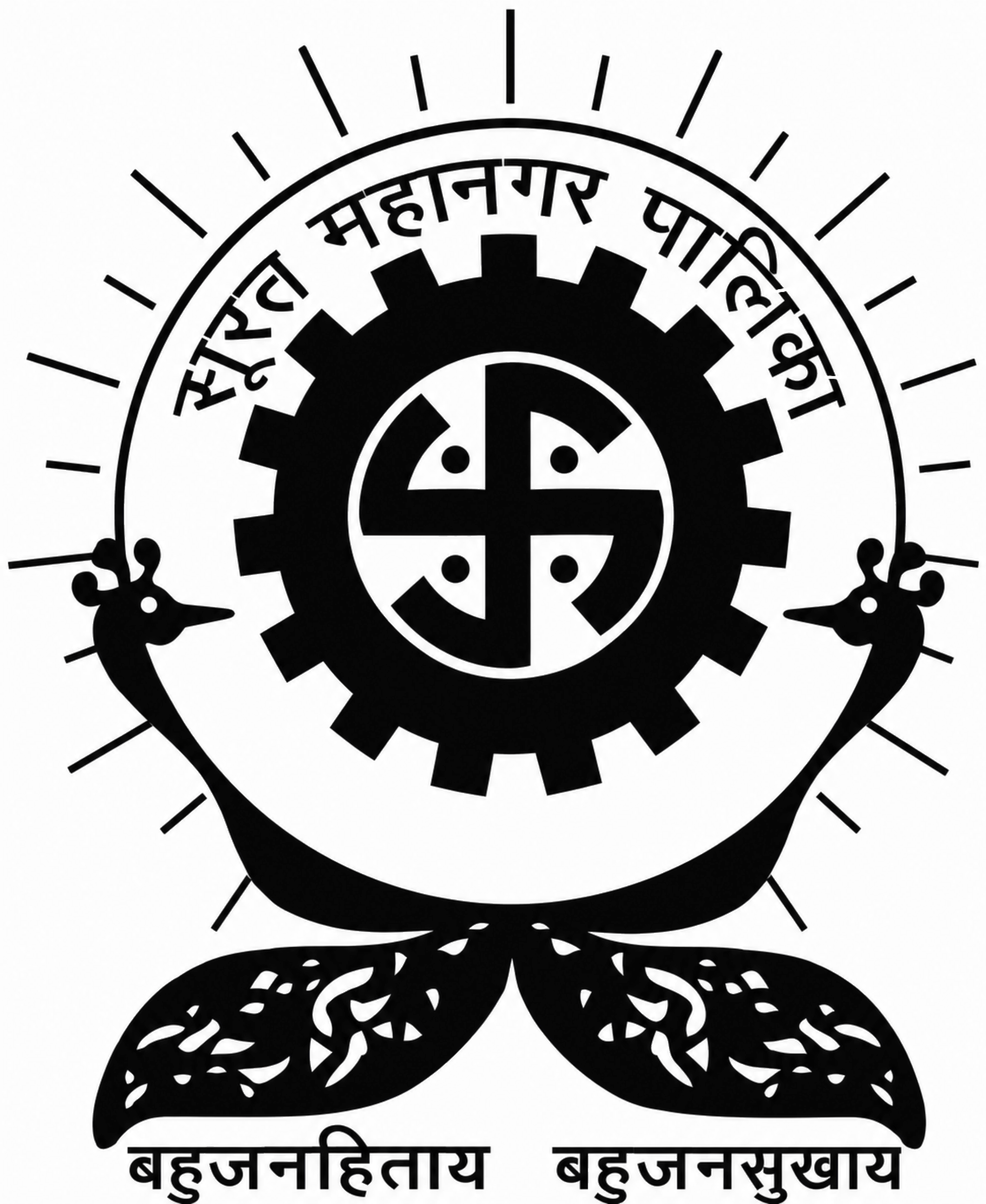
- Emblem
- Nickname: Diamond City of India
- Surat (Gujarat) Surat (India)
- Coordinates: 21°12′18″N 72°50′24″E
- Country: India
- State: Gujarat
- District: Surat
- Named for: Surya

Government
  - Type: Mayor–Council
  - Body: Surat Municipal Corporation
  - Mayor: Daxesh Mavani (BJP)

Area
  - Metropolis: 461.60 km^{2} (178.22 sq mi)
  - Metro: 722 km^{2} (279 sq mi)
- Elevation: 34.68 m (113.8 ft)

Population (2021)
  - Metropolis: 6,936,534
  - Rank: 2nd in Gujarat
  - Density: 15,027/km^{2} (38,920/sq mi)
  - Metro rank: 9th
  - Demonym: Surati
- Time zone: UTC+5:30 (IST)
- Pincode(s): 394xxx, 395xxx
- Area code: 0261
- Vehicle registration: GJ-05, GJ-19, GJ-28
- Sex ratio: 1.27 ♂/♀
- Urban planning Agency: SUDA
- Language: Gujarati
- Literacy rate: 86.65%
- Gross domestic product: $60 billion
- Website: suratmunicipal.gov.in

Surat (Gujarati: [suːɾət̪]) is a city in the western Indian state of Gujarat. The word Surat directly translates to countenance in Gujarati, Hindi and Urdu. Located on the banks of the river Tapti near its confluence with the Arabian Sea, it used to be a large seaport. It is now the commercial and economic centre of South Gujarat, and one of the largest urban areas of western India. It has well-established diamond and textile industry, and is a major supply centre for apparels and accessories. About 90% of the world's diamonds are cut and polished in Surat. It is the second largest city in Gujarat after Ahmedabad and the eighth largest city by population and ninth largest urban agglomeration in India. It is the administrative capital of the Surat district.

The city is located 284 km (176 mi) south of the state capital, Gandhinagar; 265 km (165 mi) south of Ahmedabad; and 289 km (180 mi) north of Mumbai. The city centre is located on the Tapti River (popularly known as Tapi), close to the Arabian Sea.

Surat will be the world's fastest-growing city from 2019 to 2035, according to a study conducted by The Economic Times. The city registered an annualised GDP growth rate of 11.5% over the seven fiscal years between 2001 and 2008. Surat was awarded "best city" by the Annual Survey of India's City-Systems (ASICS) in 2013. Surat has been selected as the first smart IT city in India which is being constituted by the Microsoft CityNext Initiative tied up with IT services majors Tata Consultancy Services and Wipro. The city has 2.97 million internet users, about 65% of total population. Surat was selected in 2015 for an IBM Smarter Cities Challenge grant. Surat has been selected as one of twenty Indian cities to be developed as a smart city under Prime Minister Narendra Modi's flagship Smart Cities Mission. Surat is also home to the world's largest office building by floor area, the Surat Diamond Bourse.

Surat is listed as the second cleanest city of India as of 21 August 2020 according to the Swachh Survekshan 2020 on 20 August. It suffered a major pipeline fire which caused some damage. In the 2021 edition of the same survey, it slipped to 12th place and further dropped to 25th in 2023. Despite these recent fluctuations, Surat continues to implement various cleanliness initiatives and shared the title of the cleanest city in India with Indore in the 2023 Swachh Survekshan Awards.

== History ==
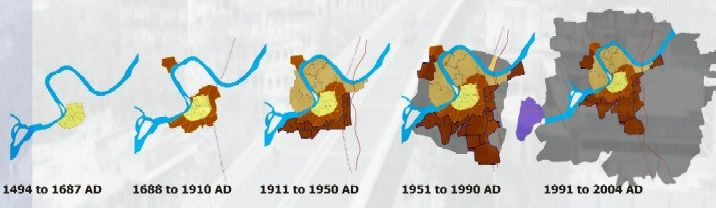
Surat growth map

=== Etymology ===
The traditional account is that Surat was built up by a wealthy Hindu merchant named Gopi around the year 1500. At first, the town had no name and was simply called "the new place". Gopi consulted with astrologers, who suggested the name "Suraj", or "Suryapur", or "city of the sun". Gopi sent a request to the unnamed king of Gujarat for this to be the new town's name. The Muslim king altered it to Surat after the word surah, which is the name of the chapters of the Qur'an. However, the names Suryapur and Surat are both mentioned in sources before 1500, so both the name and the town predate Gopi's time.

Duarte Barbosa described Surat as Suratt. Jacob Peeters referred to Surat as Sourratte which is a Dutch name. There are many other names of Surat in history. Surat is referred to as Surrat, Surate or Soorat in some literature.

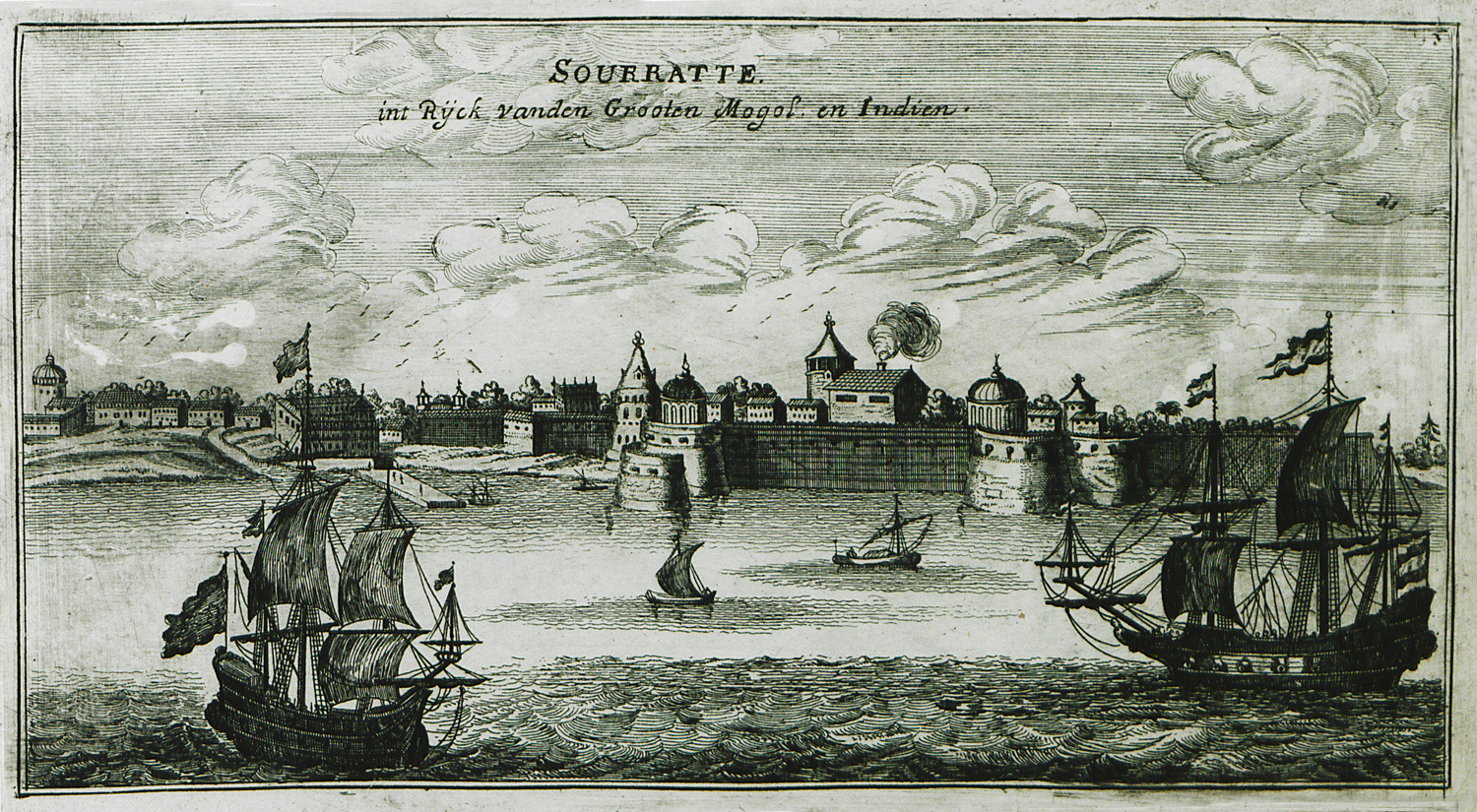
Surat in 1690

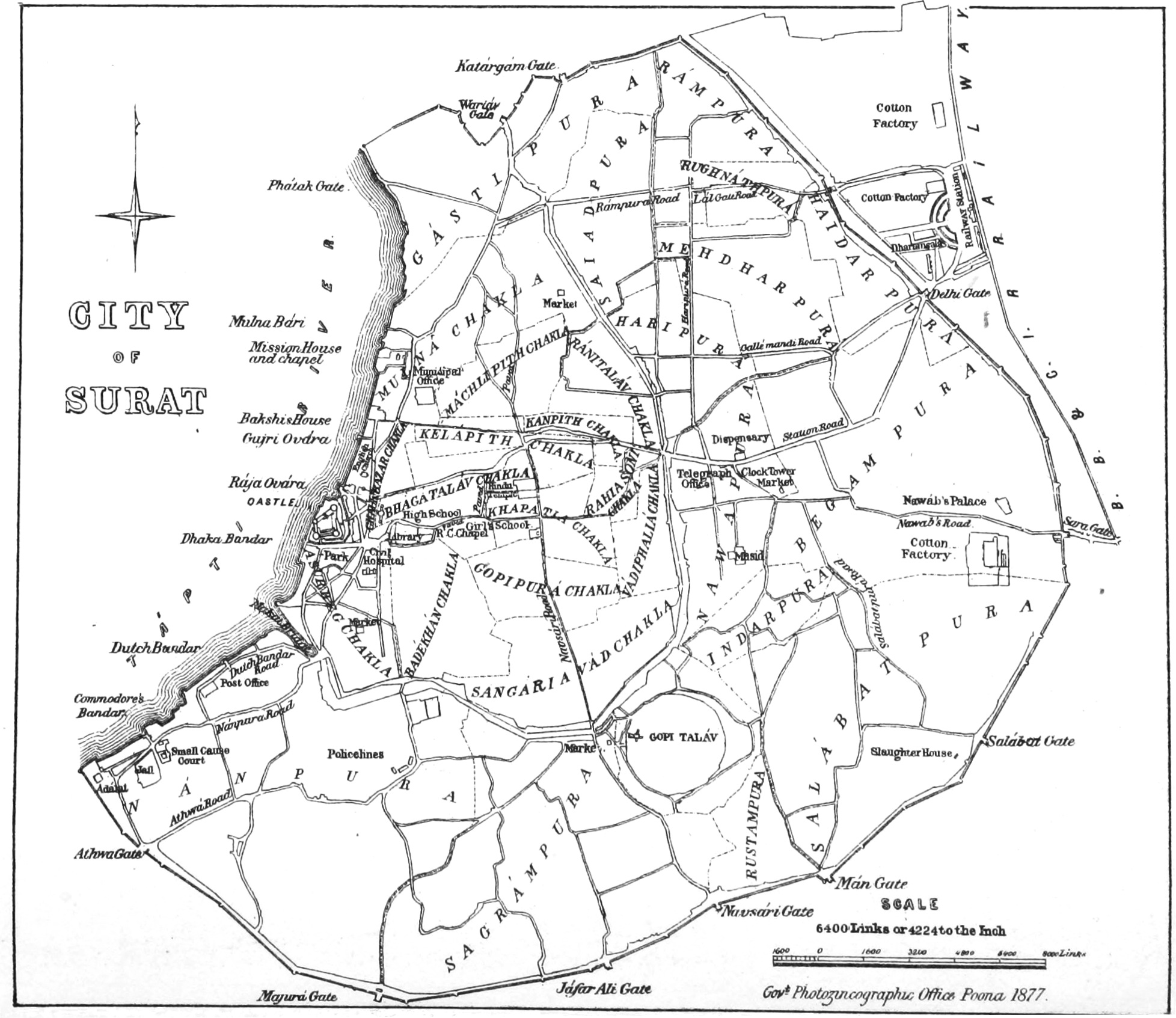
Surat in 1877

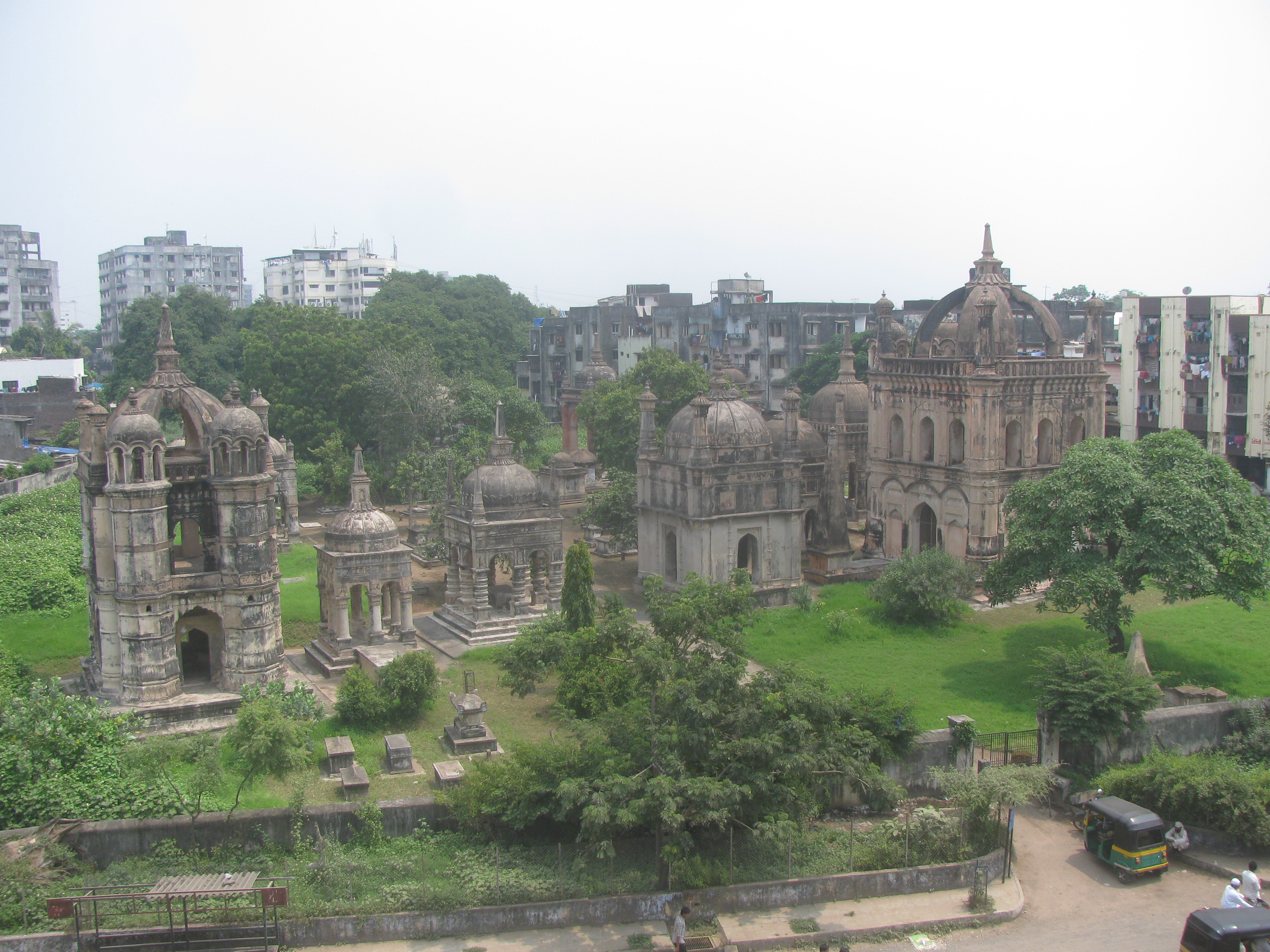
Dutch-Armenian Cemetery of Surat

=== Surat before the Mughal Empire ===
Before the rise of Surat in the 1500s, the nearby town of Rander was the main commercial centre in the area. Rander had a prominent Arab merchant community involved in overseas trade with regions such as Burma, China, Malaya, and Sumatra. In the 1500s, Rander declined due to Portuguese raids. Surat became an important port city around the same time, and some of Rander's merchant population likely moved to Surat for economic opportunity.

Early references to Surat appear by the 10th century, but they shed little light on what type of settlement it was. As Suryapur, it is mentioned along with Bharuch as a place where an army from Anhilwara passed through in 990 en route to attack the ruler of Lata. Suryapur may also be the port called "Surabaya" mentioned by the 10th-century Arabic geographer Istakhri as being four days south of Khambhat and five days north of Sanjan. Other Arabic authors spelled the name as "Subara" or "Sufara". The identification of this place with Surat, though, is uncertain, and in any case these early mentions of Suryapur or Surabaya do not indicate whether it was a sizeable town or just a small hamlet.

Another early mention of Surat is in the 1190s, after Qutb ud-Din Aibak, then a general of Muhammad Ghuri, defeated the Chaulukya king Bhima II in battle. According to the local histories of Bakshi Mian Walad Shah Ahmad and Munshi Ghulam Mohi ud-Din, Aibak went as far south as Rander and Surat. Surat was then ruled by a Hindu chief based at nearby Kamrej. This ruler initially tried to take refuge in a garden at Surat, but then decided that he had no chance of resisting Aibak's forces and offered his submission. Aibak, in turn, confirmed him as ruler of Kamrej.

From 1297, Gujarat was gradually conquered by Allauddin Khilji, the ruler of the principal state in north India at the time, the Delhi Sultanate. The Delhi Sultanate appointed Governors to control Gujarat, but this had to be forcefully imposed, notably in 1347, when Muhammad bin Tughluq sacked Surat, among other cities. Firoz Shah Tughlaq later built a fort at Surat in 1373. According to Bakshi Mian's account, when Zafar Khan was appointed governor of Gujarat in 1391, he appointed his son Masti Khan to govern Rander and Surat, but Bakshi Mian adds that Surat was not very populous at this point.

As control from the Delhi Sultanate waned at the end of the 14th century, pressure grew for an independent Gujarat, culminating in Zafar Khan declaring independence in 1407. Surat was controlled directly by the nobles of the Rajput kingdom of Baglana who fell either under the Gujarat Sultans or the Deccan sultanates. However, following the fall of the Gujarat Sultanate in 1538 it was controlled by more local nobles starting with Chengiz Khan who enjoyed absolute authority over Surat, Broach, Baroda and Champaner. However, in 1637, Aurangzeb fully annexed Baglana into the Mughal Empire.

In 1514, the Portuguese traveler Duarte Barbosa described Surat as an important seaport, frequented by many ships from Malabar and various parts of the world. By 1520, the name of the city had become Surat. It was burned by the Portuguese (1512 and 1530), conquered by the Mughals (1573) and was twice raided by the Maratha king Shivaji (17th century). Mughal Emperor Akbar placed major importance on Gujarat and successfully obtained numerous towns in Gujarat. The Mughals were able to conquer Surat due to his campaigns against Gujarat during his rule. In the 1570s, he launched two major campaigns against Gujarat—one of a much longer duration and one much shorter. The fall of Surat occurred during the former campaign and lasted one month and seventeen days. Akbar implemented large military power during these conquests, fighting many battles. Notably, the conquest of Surat was an important catalyst for overseas trade during the rule of the Mughal Empire as it became the most important port city of that reign and evolved into a bustling trading hub.

=== During the Mughal Empire ===
It was the most prosperous port in the Mughal empire. Despite being a rich city, Surat looked like a typical "grubby" trader's town with mud-and-bamboo tenements and crooked streets, although along the riverfront there were a few mansions and warehouses belonging to local merchant princes and the establishments of Turkish, Armenian, English, French and Dutch traders. There were also hospitals for cows, horses, flies and insects run by religious Jains, which puzzled travelers. Some streets were narrow while others were of sufficient width. In the evening, especially near the Bazaar (marketplace), the streets became crowded with people and merchants (including Banyan merchants) selling their goods. Surat was a populous city during the Mughal era but also had a large transient population: during the monsoon season, when ships could come and go from the ports without danger, the city's population would swell. In 1612, England established its first Indian trading factory in Surat. The city was looted twice by the Maratha king Shivaji, with the first sacking occurring in 1664. Shivaji's raids scared trade away and caused ruin to the city.

Later, Surat became the emporium of India, exporting gold and cloth. Its major industries were shipbuilding and textile manufacture. The coast of the Tapti River, from Athwalines to Dumas, was specially meant for shipbuilders, who were usually Rassis. The city continued to be prosperous until the rise of Bombay (present-day Mumbai). Afterward, Surat's shipbuilding industry declined and Surat itself gradually declined throughout the 18th century. During 1790–1791, an epidemic killed 100,000 Gujaratis in Surat. The British and Dutch both claimed control of the city, but in 1800, the British took control of Surat. A fire in 1837 resulted in more than 500 deaths and the destruction of much of the city.

By the middle of the 19th century, Surat had become a stagnant city with about 80,000 inhabitants. When India's railways opened, the city started becoming prosperous again. Silks, cotton, brocades, and objects of gold and silver from Surat became famous and the ancient art of manufacturing fine muslin was revived.

=== Surat under British Raj ===
Under British Raj, Surat saw a period of decline from its success under the Mughal Empire. Though it remained a pivotal city for textile-based products, it was less important to the British as a port city than it was for the Mughals. Nevertheless, Surat was very interconnected with Asia and Europe, involving trade with both Europeans and Armenian merchants.

Tactically, Surat involved itself in trade in fields that did not compete with existing European products, such as pearls and silver. The textile industry was also a large portion of Surat's shipping success. But despite being a primary port for textiles, Surat rarely manufactured these textiles locally. Bullion was also quite important to Surat's economy during this time. During his first-hand experience on a trip to Surat, English priest John Ovington recalls the great ores Surat possessed, such as gold and silver. He recollects the notable "abundance of Pearls" and other precious stones like diamonds that could "be purchas'd here [Surat] at very reasonable rates". As Ovington observed, this industry was imperative to Surat's prosperity under the British Raj and allowed it to maintain its relevance as a port city.

During the Quit India Movement of Mahatma Gandhi in 1942, 3,000 Koli cultivators from Matwad, Karadi, Machhad and Kothmadi in Surat District fought against the Indian Imperial Police at Matwad with lathis and dharias on 21 August 1942. In this fight, four persons including one policeman died. The kolis also snatched away four police rifles and two bayonets. Kolis smashed up the Jalalpore Railway Station, removed the Rails and burnt down the post office. After this, situation in the neighbouring towns of Borsad, Anand and Thasra taluqas became so tense that troops were marched through the villages between 22 and 24 August 1942 to restore order.

=== Armenians in Surat ===
The Armenian community in Surat, India, flourished from the 16th to the 17th centuries, leaving a lasting impact on the city's history. The Armenian gravestones in Surat, dating back to this period, are intricate and well-preserved, showcasing the community's presence and customs.

Armenians in Surat were renowned traders, dealing in jewelry, precious stones, cotton, and silk. They established trade routes to destinations such as Egypt, the Levant, Turkey, Venice, and Leghorn, often traveling with their families.

The British recognised the Armenians' business prowess, seeking their cooperation for trading privileges in the Mughal court. Today, these gravestones serve as a poignant reminder of the Armenian community's significant contributions to Surat's history and culture.

=== Modern period ===
==== Post Independence ====
After India gained independence on 15 August 1947, Surat became part of India. At that time it was a part of Bombay State. Later it became the part of Gujarat state. Along with Mumbai, Ahmedabad, Pune, Nagpur and Vadodara, Surat became one of the fast growing cities and major commercial and industrial centers of Western India. During the post-independence period, Surat has experienced considerable growth in industrial activities especially textiles and chemical along with trading activities.

==== 1994 plague ====
Surat faced a major health crisis in 1994. News of a plague outbreak in Surat occurred in September 1994, and when the possibility of quarantine for the city was mentioned, many residents of Surat fled the city.

About a quarter of Surat's population fled the city, including people who were in the incubation phase of the disease. This, in turn, partly contributed to the spread of the plague throughout India.

In the media, the cause of the plague was attributed to poor garbage disposal. However, the spread was instead brought about by rodents and fleas which were inadvertently caused by garbage in Surat. The disease ran more rampant through the slum population of Surat. In order to combat the spread of this disease, Surat closed its schools, universities, and public places for an indefinite period. They also ordered the shutdown of important industrial businesses, including diamond-cutting units. Eventually, antibiotics were given out and the plague was controlled. Prior to the major plague outbreak, Surat Municipal Corporation was suspended in 1993, leaving no major elected body in charge. During the plague, Suryadevara Ramachandra Rao was elected as the new administrator and launched extensive cleaning campaigns to combat the outbreak.

This was a major step towards sanitation and cleanliness in Surat. Rao's campaigns included launching hotel and shop inspections (to address their irresponsible garbage practices) for several months and calling for the broadening of roads. He enforced designated sweeping of the city as well as the regular collection of garbage. Rao also demolished many illegal constructions. However, slums would often fall subject to removal when streets were widened, but Rao ensured that the residents were given alternative residential sites with adequate facilities to accommodate them. Rao's urban and sanitary-related actions fostered the revival of Surat in its post-plague state.

Nevertheless, the plague had long-lasting implications for Surat. It brought attention to the lack of information and the spread of misinformation that occurred in India. Incorrect death tolls and false facts about the cause of the disease were spread, leaving lots of room for post-plague city revival both in terms of information control and cleanliness. Surat's actions pertaining to the latter eventually resulted in the Indian National Trust for Art and Cultural Heritage deeming Surat as the second cleanest city in India.

==== Present-day Surat ====
On 2 October 2007, Surat district was split into two by the creation of a new Tapi district, under the Surat District Re-organisation Act 2007.

== Geography ==
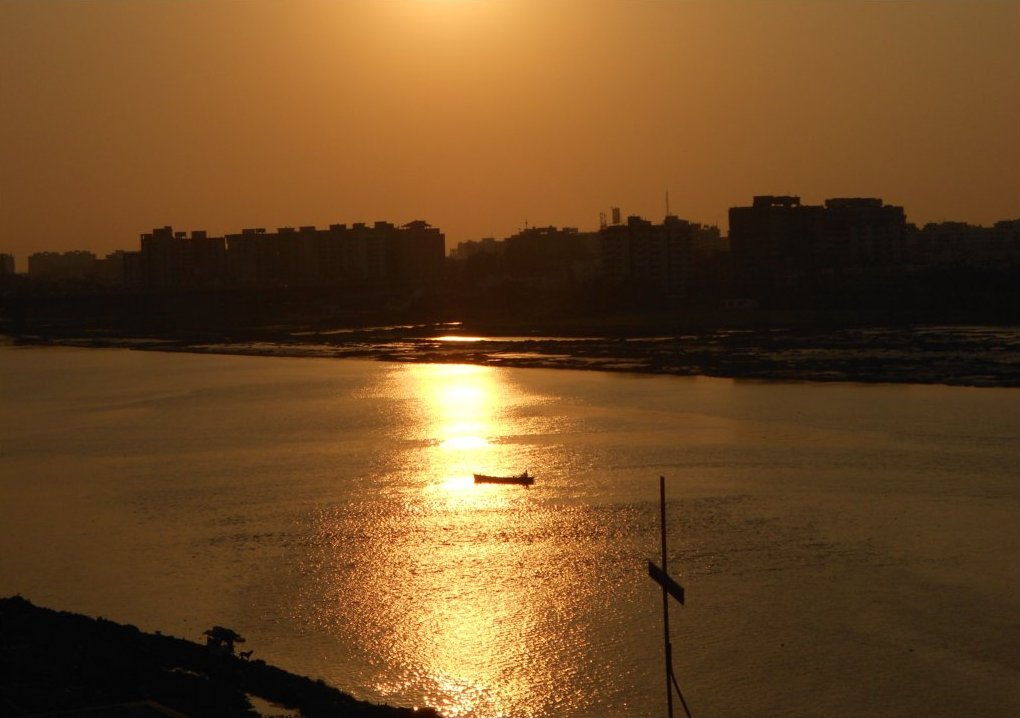
Tapi River

Surat is a port city situated on the banks of the Tapi river. After dams were built, water flow in Tapi deceased causing the original port facilities to close. The nearest port is now in the Magadalla and Hazira area of Surat Metropolitan Region. It has a famous beach called 'Dumas Beach' located in Dumas.The city is located at 21°12′18″N 72°50′24″E. It has an average elevation of 13 metres (43 ft). The Surat district is surrounded by the Bharuch, Narmada, Navsari and Tapi districts, and Gulf of Cambay to the west. The climate is tropical and monsoon rainfall is abundant. According to the Bureau of Indian Standards, the town falls under seismic zone-III, in a scale of I to V (in order of increasing vulnerability to earthquakes).

=== Climate ===
Surat has a tropical savanna climate (Köppen: Aw), moderated strongly by the Sea to the Gulf of Camboy. The summer begins in early March and lasts until June. April and May are the hottest months, the average maximum temperature being 37 °C (99 °F). Monsoon begins in late June and the city receives about 1,200 mm (47 in) of rain by the end of September, with the average maximum being 32 °C (90 °F) during those months. October and November see the retreat of the monsoon and a return of high temperatures until late November. Winter starts in December and ends in late February, with average mean temperatures of around 23 °C (73 °F), and negligible rain.

Since the 20th century, Surat has experienced some 20 floods. In 1968, most parts of the city were flooded and in 1994 a flood caused a country-wide plague outbreak, Surat being the epicenter. In 1998, 30 per cent of Surat had gone under water due to flooding in Tapti river following release of water from Ukai dam located 90 km from Surat and in Aug 2006 flood more than 95 per cent of the city was under Tapti river waters, killing more than 120 people, stranding tens of thousands in their homes without food or electricity and closing businesses and schools for weeks. The city is expected to experience more flooding and extreme weather as climate change becomes worse, so has invested in flood protection and climate resilience infrastructure.

Climate data for Surat (1991–2020, extremes 1877–2012)
Month	Jan	Feb	Mar	Apr	May	Jun	Jul	Aug	Sep	Oct	Nov	Dec	Year
Record high °C (°F)	38.3 (100.9)	41.7 (107.1)	44.0 (111.2)	45.6 (114.1)	45.6 (114.1)	45.6 (114.1)	38.9 (102.0)	37.2 (99.0)	41.1 (106.0)	41.4 (106.5)	39.4 (102.9)	38.9 (102.0)	45.6 (114.1)
Mean daily maximum °C (°F)	30.2 (86.4)	32.2 (90.0)	35.4 (95.7)	36.6 (97.9)	35.7 (96.3)	33.8 (92.8)	31.1 (88.0)	30.8 (87.4)	32.0 (89.6)	34.9 (94.8)	34.1 (93.4)	31.6 (88.9)	33.2 (91.8)
Daily mean °C (°F)	22.6 (72.7)	24.7 (76.5)	28.0 (82.4)	30.3 (86.5)	31.4 (88.5)	30.3 (86.5)	28.7 (83.7)	28.1 (82.6)	28.6 (83.5)	29.0 (84.2)	26.8 (80.2)	23.7 (74.7)	27.7 (81.8)
Mean daily minimum °C (°F)	15.2 (59.4)	17.2 (63.0)	20.9 (69.6)	24.4 (75.9)	27.4 (81.3)	27.3 (81.1)	26.2 (79.2)	25.9 (78.6)	25.6 (78.1)	23.5 (74.3)	19.9 (67.8)	16.6 (61.9)	22.5 (72.5)
Record low °C (°F)	4.4 (39.9)	5.6 (42.1)	8.9 (48.0)	15.0 (59.0)	19.4 (66.9)	20.2 (68.4)	19.9 (67.8)	20.2 (68.4)	20.6 (69.1)	14.4 (57.9)	10.6 (51.1)	6.7 (44.1)	4.4 (39.9)
Average rainfall mm (inches)	1.9 (0.07)	0.3 (0.01)	0.7 (0.03)	0.5 (0.02)	2.4 (0.09)	255.9 (10.07)	466.3 (18.36)	281.7 (11.09)	186.7 (7.35)	40.7 (1.60)	5.1 (0.20)	1.1 (0.04)	1,243.4 (48.95)
Average rainy days	0.2	0.1	0.1	0.1	0.2	8.0	15.0	12.3	8.1	2.0	0.5	0.1	46.5
Average relative humidity (%) (at 17:30 IST)	41	35	32	43	61	72	81	80	72	54	46	45	55
Average dew point °C (°F)	9 (48)	10 (50)	10 (50)	14 (57)	19 (66)	23 (73)	25 (77)	25 (77)	24 (75)	19 (66)	14 (57)	11 (52)	17 (62)
Average ultraviolet index	6	7	7	8	8	7	6	6	7	7	7	6	7
Source 1: India Meteorological Department Time and Date (dewpoints, 2005–2015)
Source 2: Tokyo Climate Center (mean temperatures 1991–2020); Weather Atlas

== Demographics ==
Languages of Surat (2011)
1. Gujarati (54.4%)
2. Hindi (22.4%)
3. Marathi (9.92%)
4. Urdu (3.24%)
5. Odia (3.11%)
6. Marwari (1.74%)
7. Bhojpuri (1.38%)
8. Others (3.80%)

Religion in Surat City (2011)
Hinduism	85.31%
Islam	11.63%
Jainism	2.31%
Others/not stated	0.76%

Historical population
Year	Pop.	±%
1810	73,000	—
1871	107,100	+46.7%
1881	109,800	+2.5%
1891	109,200	−0.5%
1901	119,300	+9.2%
1911	114,900	−3.7%
1921	117,400	+2.2%
1931	98,900	−15.8%
1941	171,400	+73.3%
1951	223,200	+30.2%
1961	288,000	+29.0%
1968	368,900	+28.1%
1971	492,700	+33.6%
1981	912,600	+85.2%
1991	1,519,000	+66.4%
2001	2,811,614	+85.1%
2011	4,591,246	+63.3%

A resident of Surat is called Surati. According to the 2011 India census, the population of Surat is 4,467,797. Surat has an average literacy rate of 89%, higher than the national average of 79.5%, male literacy is 93%, and female literacy is 84%. Males constitute 53% of the population and females 47%. In Surat, 13% of the population is under 6 years of age.

Hindus are the majority community. Muslims and Jains are the largest minorities, and there is a small Buddhist and Christian community.

At the time of the 2011 census, 54.42% of the population spoke Gujarati, 22.39% Hindi, 9.92% Marathi, 3.24% Urdu, 3.11% Odia, 1.74% Marwari and 1.38% Bhojpuri as their first language.

== Politics ==
Surat is a stronghold of the BJP, which has ruled Gujarat continuously for 30 years. Mukesh Dalal, of the BJP, is the MP from the Surat Lok Sabha constituency. He was elected unopposed to the Lok Sabha in 2024.

Govind Dholakia he was nominated by the Bharatiya Janata Party (BJP) to the Rajya Sabha, elected unopposed for the term spanning from 2024 to 2030.

The assembly constituencies of Surat district are:

District	No.	Constituency	Name	Party	Remarks
Surat	155	Olpad	Mukesh Patel	MoS	
Surat	156	Mangrol (Surat) (ST)	Ganpat Vasava		
Surat	157	Mandvi (Surat) (ST)	Kunvarji Halpati	MoS	
Surat	158	Kamrej	Prafulbhai Pansheriya	MoS	
Surat	159	Surat East	Arvind Rana		
Surat	160	Surat North	Kanti Balar		
Surat	161	Varachha Road	Kishor Kanani		
Surat	162	Karanj	Pravin Ghoghari		
Surat	163	Limbayat	Sangita Patil		
Surat	164	Udhana	Manu Patel		
Surat	165	Majura	Harsh Sanghavi	MoS(I/C)	
Surat	166	Katargam	Vinod Moradiya		
Surat	167	Surat West	Purnesh Modi		
Surat	168	Choryasi	Sandip Desai		
Surat	169	Bardoli (SC)	Ishwarbhai Parmar		
Surat	170	Mahuva (Surat) (ST)	Mohanbhai Dhodia		

== Civic institutions ==
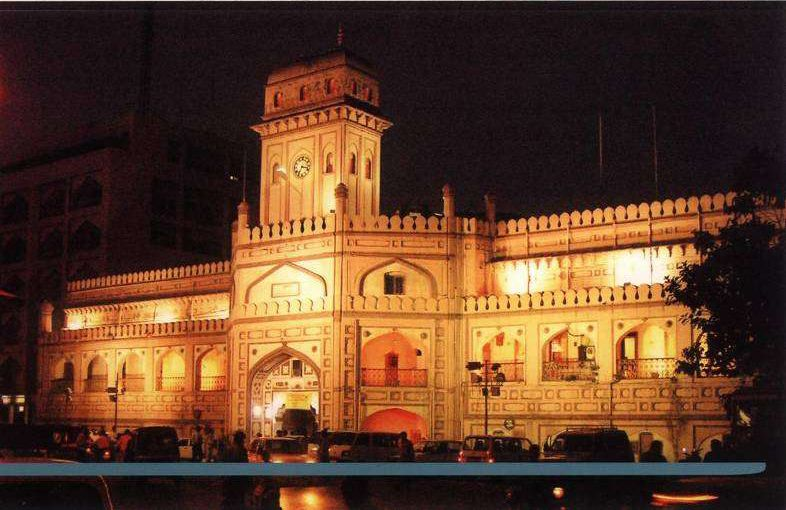
Muglisarai SMC Surat

The Surat Municipal Corporation is responsible for maintaining the city's civic infrastructure as well as carrying out associated administrative duties. At present, BJP is the ruling party with a majority. Under the Provisions of Bombay Provincial Municipal Corporations Act, 1949, Section – 4, the powers have been vested in three distinct statutory authorities: the General Board, the Standing Committee, and the Municipal Commissioner. It ranked 7 out of 21 cities for best administrative practices in India in 2014. It scored 3.5 on 10 compared to the national average of 3.3. It is the only city in India to disclose municipal budgets on a weekly basis.

=== Public safety ===
Surat began the 'Safe City Project' in 2011 aimed at keeping the city safe using surveillance cameras. The project was headed by Sanjay Srivastava (IPS) who was then the Joint-Commissioner of Surat Police. The 280-square-foot video wall claimed to be the largest surveillance screen in the country, is being installed in the control room of Police Commissioner Mr. Rakesh Asthana (IPS). This will help the police view the entire city live through 10,000 CCTV cameras across the city. Surat police have decided to install 5,000 CCTV cameras at sensitive points across the city. While 1,000 cameras will be night vision cameras, 4,000 others will be simple CCTV cameras. This has been installed on PPP base with the help of the city's businessmen, the city's social persons, Surat Municipal Corporation, and the Surat City Police.

=== Hospitals ===
- Government Medical College
- Surat Municipal Institute of Medical Education and Research
- Kiran Hospital

== Economy ==
Surat ranked ninth in India with a GDP of $40 billion in the fiscal year 2016. The GDP of Surat in 2020 will be around $57 billion estimated by The City Mayors Foundation, an international think tank on urban affairs. Surat is a major hub of diamond cutting and polishing. The first diamond workshops in Gujarat appeared in Surat and Navasari in the late 1950s. The major group working in this industry is people from the Saurashtra region of Gujarat. Because of demand in the American market from the early 1970s to the mid-1980s (with only a brief recession in 1979), Surat's diamond industry grew tremendously. Currently, most of the diamond polishing workshops are running in the Varachha area of Surat, mostly by the people of the Patel community. Around the world, 8 out of 10 diamonds on the market were cut and polished in Surat. A 2024 NITI Aayog report estimated that the Surat Economic Region processes around 90% of the world's natural diamonds and approximately 25% of global lab-grown diamonds. The report also identified around 6,000 diamond-cutting and polishing units in the region, approximately 70% of which are MSMEs. This industry earns India about US$10 billion in annual exports. That declined by about 18% in 2019 due to reduced demand for diamonds. The decline continued in 2020 when the industry closed for some months because of the COVID-19 pandemic in India. A legacy of old Dutch trade links, it began after a Surti entrepreneur returned from East Africa bringing diamond cutters. The rough diamonds are mined in South Africa and other regions of the African continent, and go from here as smooth gems to Antwerp, Belgium where the international diamond trade is run mainly by Hasidic Jews and Jains from Palanpur in North Gujarat. Surat's economy derives from a range of manufacturing and industry fields such as diamonds, textiles, petrochemicals, shipbuilding, automobile, and ports.

Since it is known for producing textiles, including silk, Surat is known as the textile hub of the nation or the Silk City of India. It is very famous for its cotton mills and Surat Zari Craft. Surat is the biggest center of MMF (man-made fiber) in India. It has a total of 381 dyeing and printing mills and 41,100 power loom units. There are over a hundred thousand units and mills in total. The overall annual turnover is around 5 billion rupees. There are over 800 cloth wholesalers in Surat. It is the largest manufacturer of clothes in India, and Surti dress material can be found in any state of India. Surat produces 9 million meters of fabric annually, which accounts for 60% of the total polyester cloth production in India. Now the city is focusing on increasing the exports of its textile.

There are many SME Domestic IT Companies present in Surat. MNC IT companies like IBM, HCL have satellite or virtual branches in Surat. On 14 February 2014, Government of Gujarat DST had handover STPI Surat at Bhestan-Jiav Road, Bhestan Near Udhana-Sachin BRTS Route. Surat city administration will demand for setting up of an information technology (IT) hub and an Indian Institute of Information Technology (IIIT) on the outskirts of the city. Microsoft CityNext initiative has tied up with IT services majors Tata Consultancy Services and Wipro to leverage technology for sustainable growth of cities in India. The first smart IT city in India is being constituted by the Microsoft CityNext Initiative in Surat, Gujarat. In 2011, Surat hosted India's first Microsoft DreamSpark Yatra (a tech event) with speakers from Microsoft Headquarters at Redmond, Washington. The event was organised by ex-Microsoft Student Partner Samarth Zankharia. In May 2015, Tech giant IBM chose Surat among 16 global locations for its smart cities program to help them address challenges like waste management, disaster management and citizen services. Under the program, IBM will send a team of experts to each of the chosen cities where they will spend three weeks working closely with city staff analysing data about critical issues faced by its local bodies; the co-operation continued into 2016.

Surat is a port city, and has become a major commercial and industrial hub in India. It is home for many companies such as Oil and Natural Gas Corporation, Reliance Industries (Hazira Manufacturing Division), Essar Steel, Larsen & Toubro, Krishak Bharati Cooperative, NTPC Limited, Bharat Petroleum, Indian Oil Corporation, UltraTech Cement, Shell, GAIL, GSEG, Gujarat State Petroleum Corporation, Hero MotoCorp etc. Hazira Port is located in Hazira, an industrial suburb where most of the industries are located while other region is Magdalla which is also developed as Port of Magdalla.

The government of Gujarat plans another project near Surat similar to Gujarat International Finance Tec-City (GIFT). The chief minister has suggested that the government wishes to develop DREAM to have a five-seven star hotel, bank, IT, corporate trading house, entertainment zone and other facilities while the Surat Diamond Bourse (SDB) will be based there. Allotment of Khajod land for the project is convenient for the state government because they have 2,000 acres (810 ha) of available land. The Trade Centre, located near Sarsana village, will have a 100,160 m^{2} (1,078,100 sq ft) pillar-less air-conditioned hall with a 90 by 35 m (295 by 115 ft) pillar-less dome.

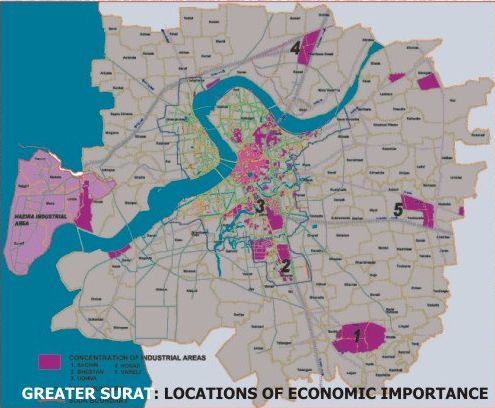
Metropolitan Surat economic centers and industries map

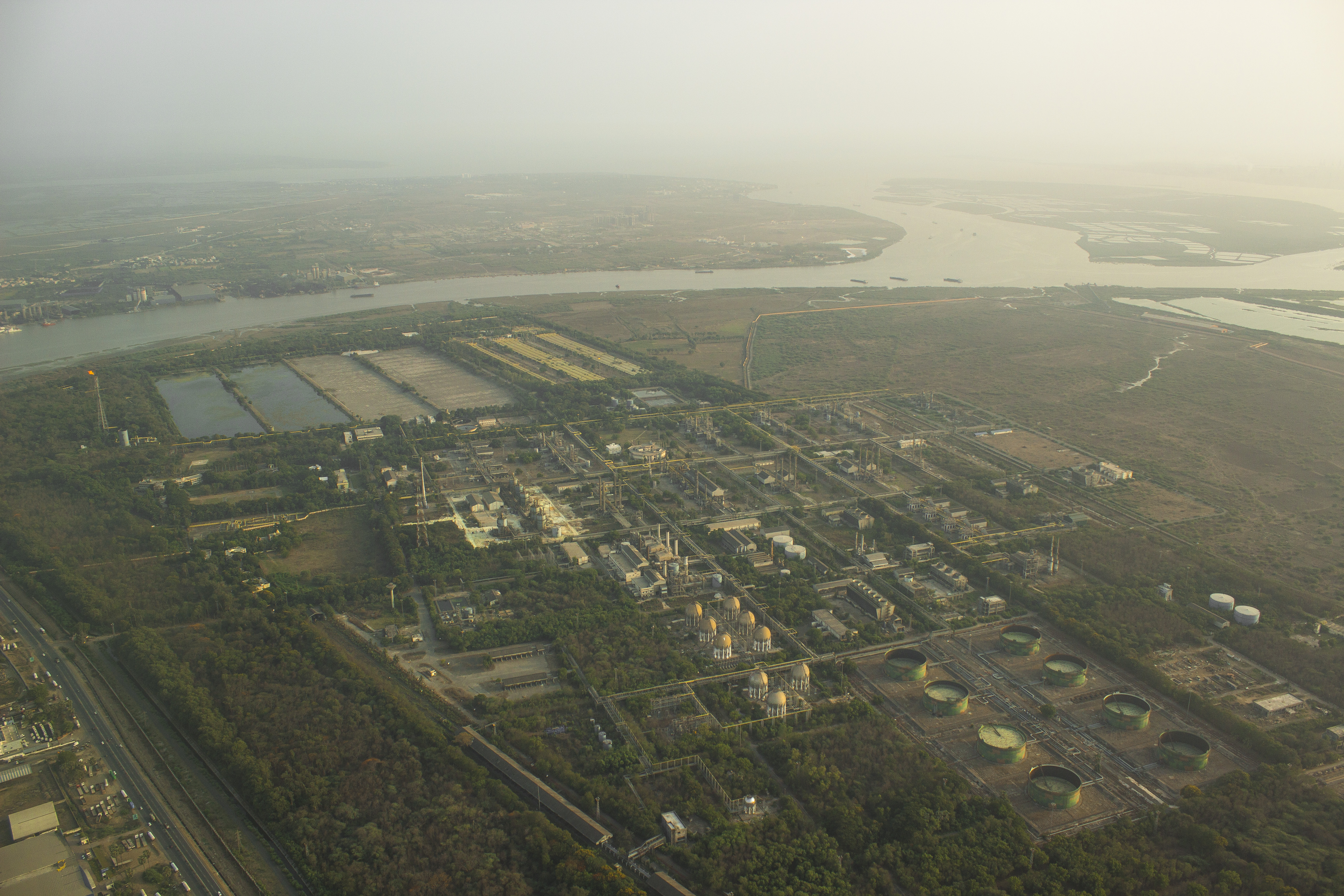
ONGC plant in Hazira

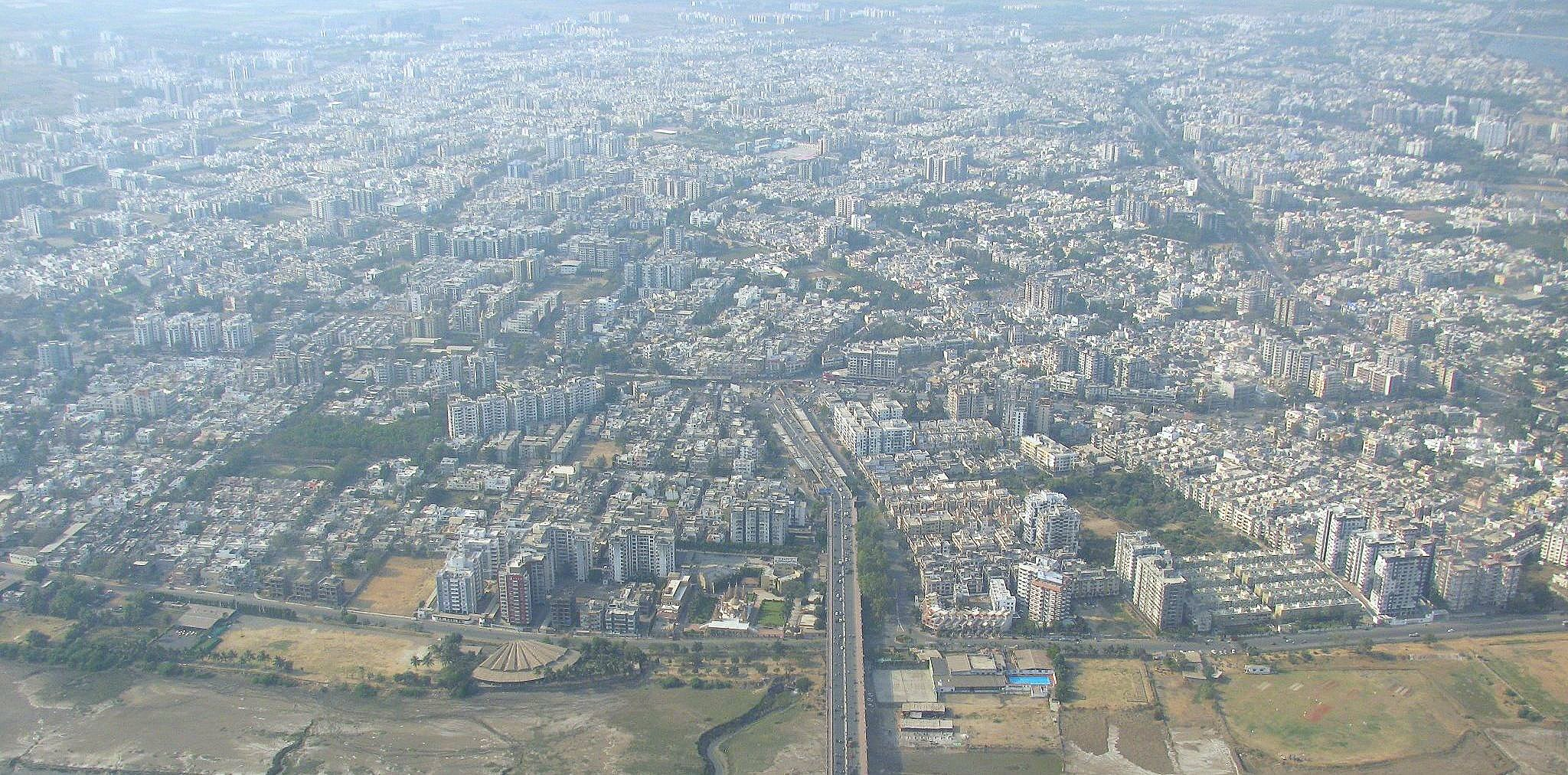
Aerial view of Surat, Adajan side. Sardar Patel bridge on Tapti river is visible in the middle.

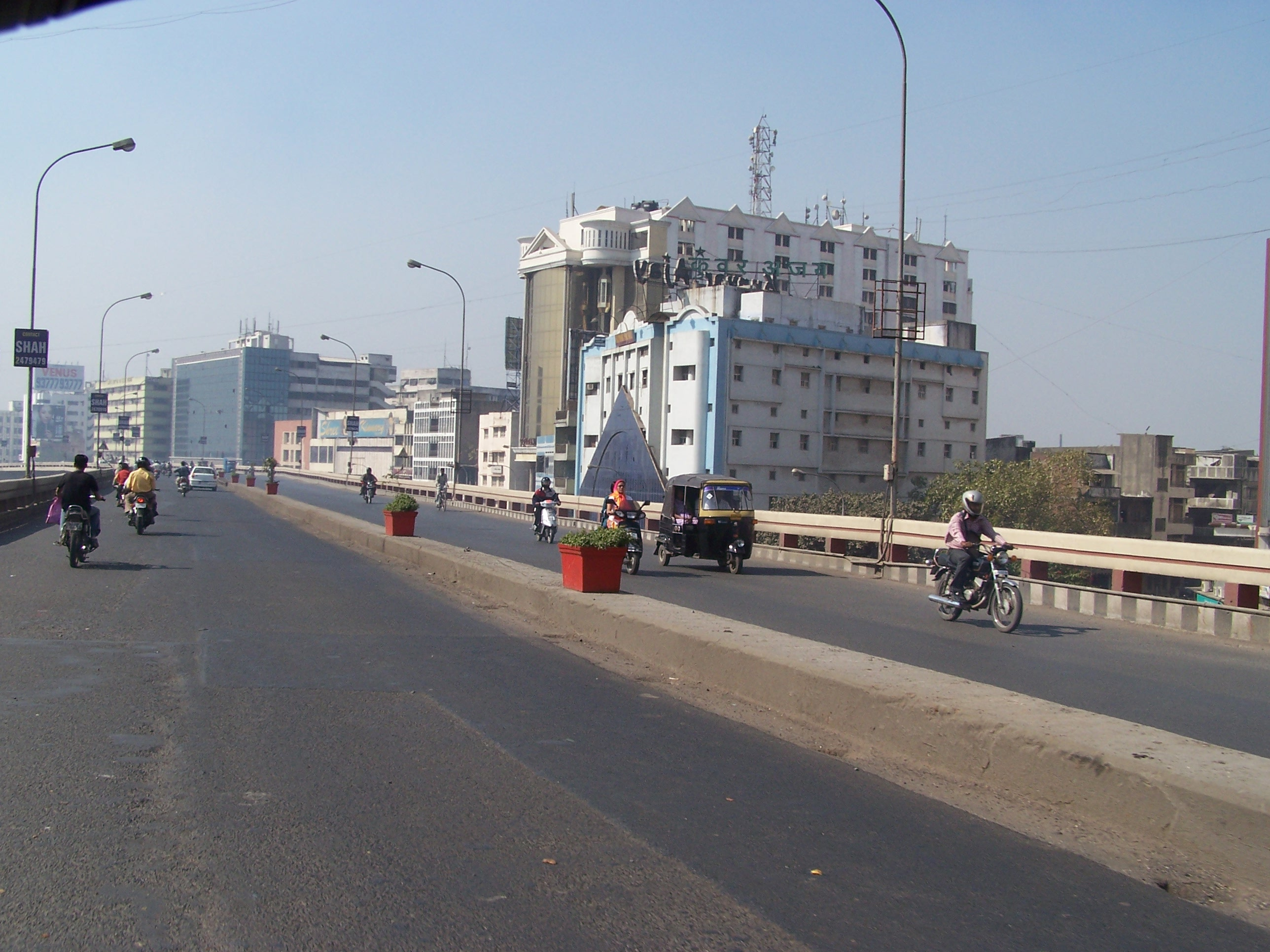
Surat's Textile District Ring Road in 2007

== Transport ==
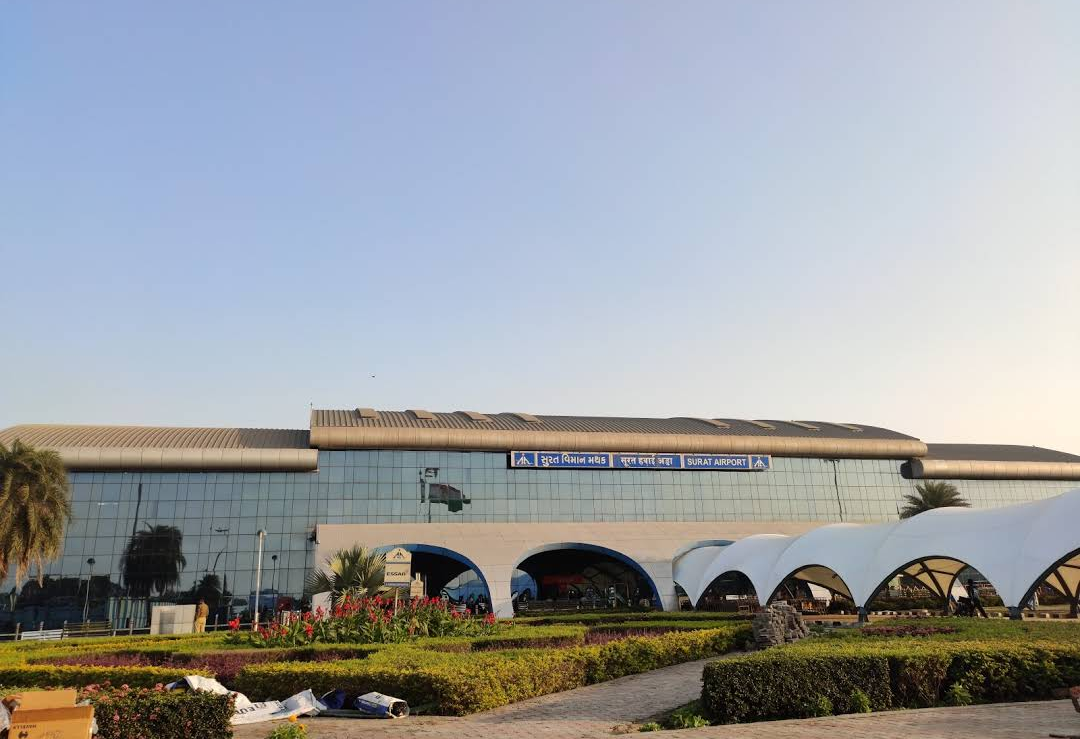
Surat International Airport

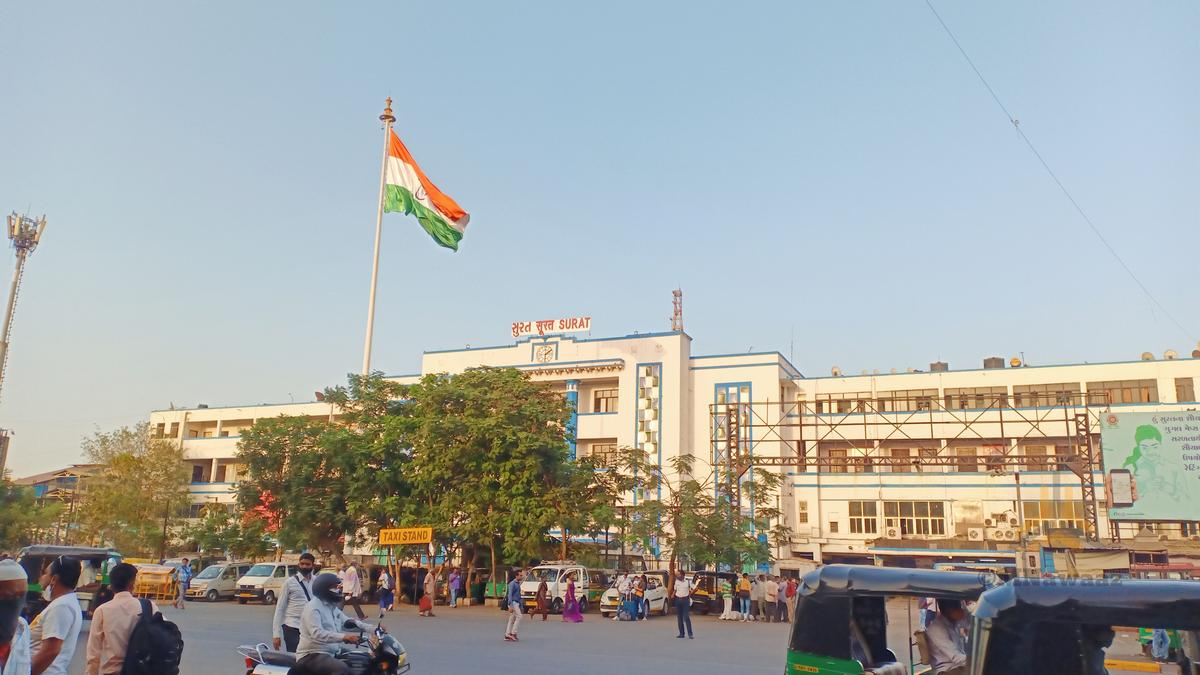
Surat railway station

Built in 1860, Surat railway station falls under the administrative control of Western Railway zone of the Indian Railways. In early 2016, the Indian Railway Catering and Tourism Corporation rated the facility the best large station in India based on cleanliness.

The Sitilink or Surat BRTS is a bus rapid transit system in the city. Initiated by Bharat Shah, additional city engineer of Surat Municipal Corporation. It is operated by Surat Municipal Corporation and as of now, It consists of 1136 buses and runs on 66 different routes, covering 85 per cent of urban area. More than 3.50 lakh passengers use public transport daily.

Surat International Airport located in Magdalla, 11 kilometres (7 mi) southwest of Surat. It is the second busiest airport in Gujarat in terms of both aircraft movements and passenger traffic. Currently, airlines such as Air India, Alliance Air, AirAsia India, SpiceJet, IndiGo Airlines, Air Odisha, and Ventura AirConnect provide flight services from the Surat to various major cities like New Delhi, Mumbai, Kolkata, Chennai, Bengaluru, Hyderabad, Goa, Jaipur, Visakhapatnam. There are also regular international flights on the Sharjah route of Air India Express. Apart from the main city, Surat Airport also caters to various localities of south Gujarat including Navsari, Bardoli, Valsad, Bharuch, Ankleshwar.

Surat Metro is an under construction rapid transit rail system for the city.

== Culture ==
=== Food ===
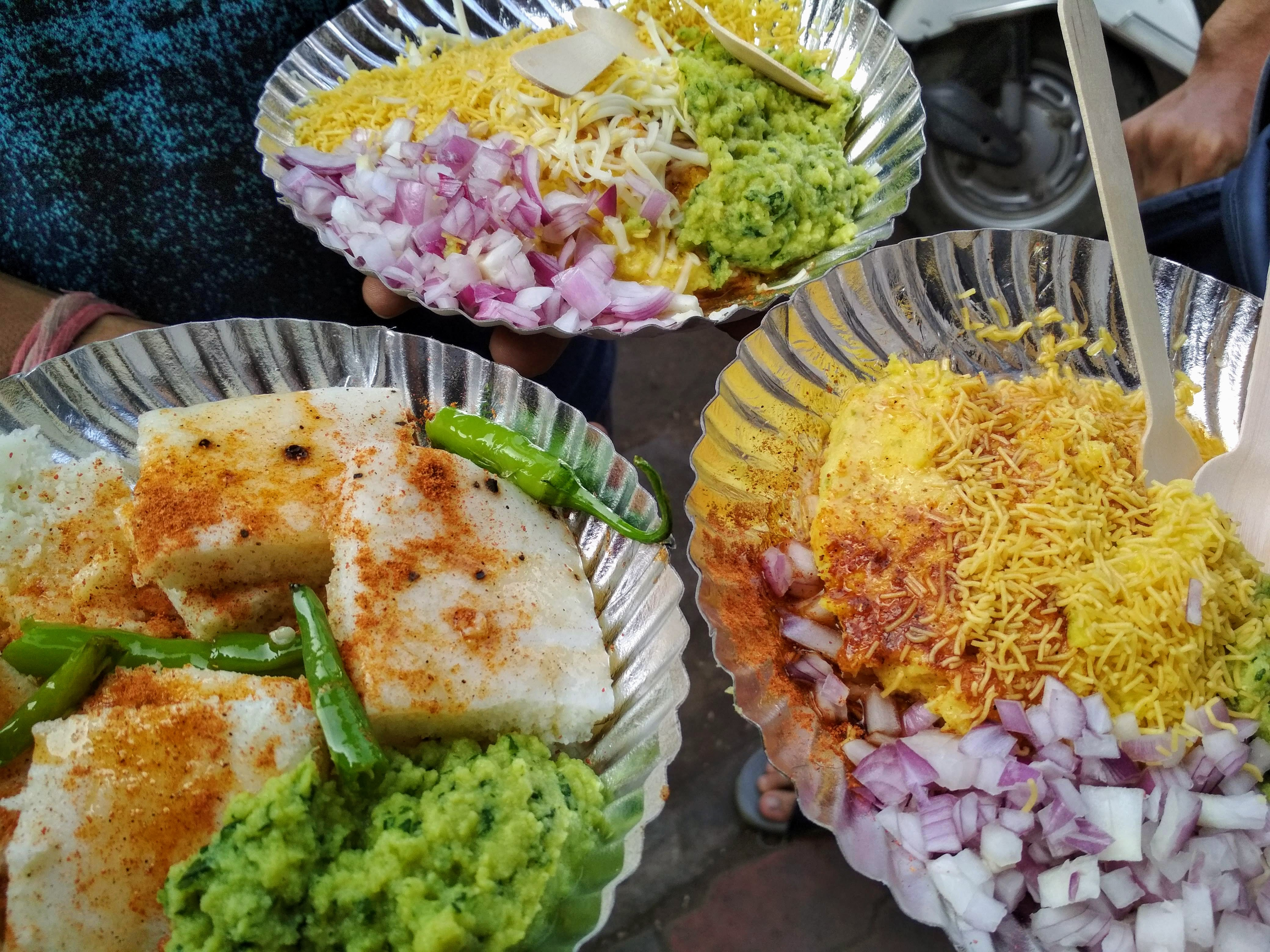
Locho and Idada

Surat is known for its food and has its own list of cherished street foods. There is a famous saying in Gujarati, "સુરતનું જમણ અને કાશીનું મરણ", meaning Eat in Surat and Die in Kashi for the ultimate experience of the soul.

The unique dishes of Surat include locho, ghari, surti bhusu, alupuri, kavsa, ponk, ulta vadapav, undhiyu, dhokla, khaman, rasaawala kaman, and sev khamani.

People's love for food in Surat is so great that there is a lane called "Khaudra Gali", which means "foodie's lane", which has all stalls of various types of dishes, the specialty being Mysore Dosa.

== Education ==
=== Universities ===
Sardar Vallabhbhai National Institute of Technology, Surat is one of 31 National Institutes of Technology that are recognised as Institutes of National Importance by the Government of India. Indian Institute of Information Technology, Surat started in 2017.

Most of the regional colleges are affiliated to Veer Narmad South Gujarat University (VNSGU, named after the poet Veer Narmad), which has headquarters in the Surat Metropolitan Region. Colleges are also affiliated to SNDT, Gujarat Technological University and other universities. Government Medical College, Surat is a more than 50 years old medical school of 250 yearly student admission capacity with attached tertiary care hospital, New Civil Hospital. Surat Municipal Institute of Medical Education and Research (SMIMER) is a Municipal Medical College affiliated with the Veer Narmad South Gujarat University. Auro University has also started to provide education in Surat.

=== Science Centre ===
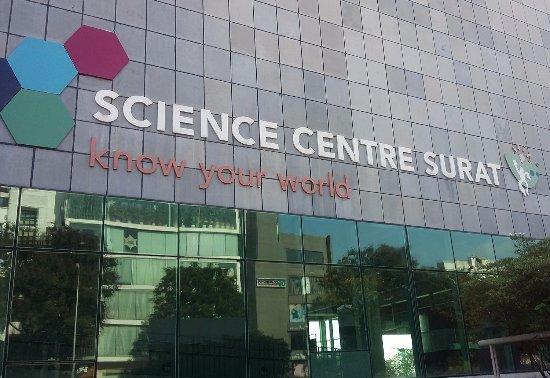
Science Center And Science Museum

Science Centre is a multi-facility complex built by the Surat Municipal Corporation in 2009, the first of its type in western India. The complex houses a science centre, museum, an art gallery, an auditorium, an amphitheater, and a planetarium.

== Sports ==
=== Pandit Dindayal Upadhyay Indoor Stadium ===
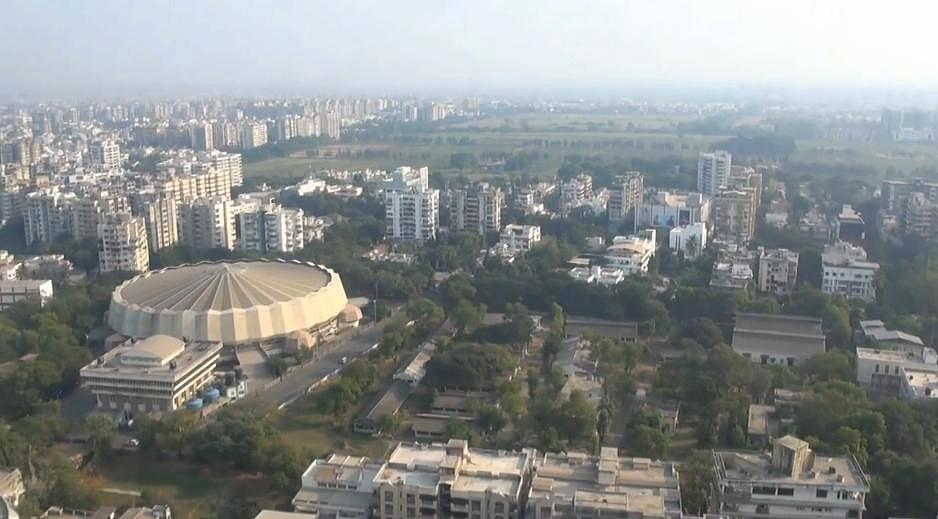
Pandit DinDayal Upadhyay Indoor Stadium, Surat

With a seating capacity of 6800, Pandit Dindayal Upadhyay Indoor Stadium is the first of its kind in the Western Region of India. The stadium frequently organises national and international indoor games such as volleyball, table tennis, gymnastics, handball, boxing, wrestling, badminton, basketball, and tennis. It has a central arena of size 63 m × 33 m, rooms for participants and team officials, and other essential facilities including snack bars. This is also a convenient venue for organising cultural programs, music concerts, drama, fashion shows, seminars, conferences, and many more. The Indoor Stadium also hosted TEDxSurat 2018 on 7 October 2018 which was the largest TEDx conference in Gujarat and one of the largest TEDx conferences in the world.

=== Lalbhai Contractor Cricket Stadium ===
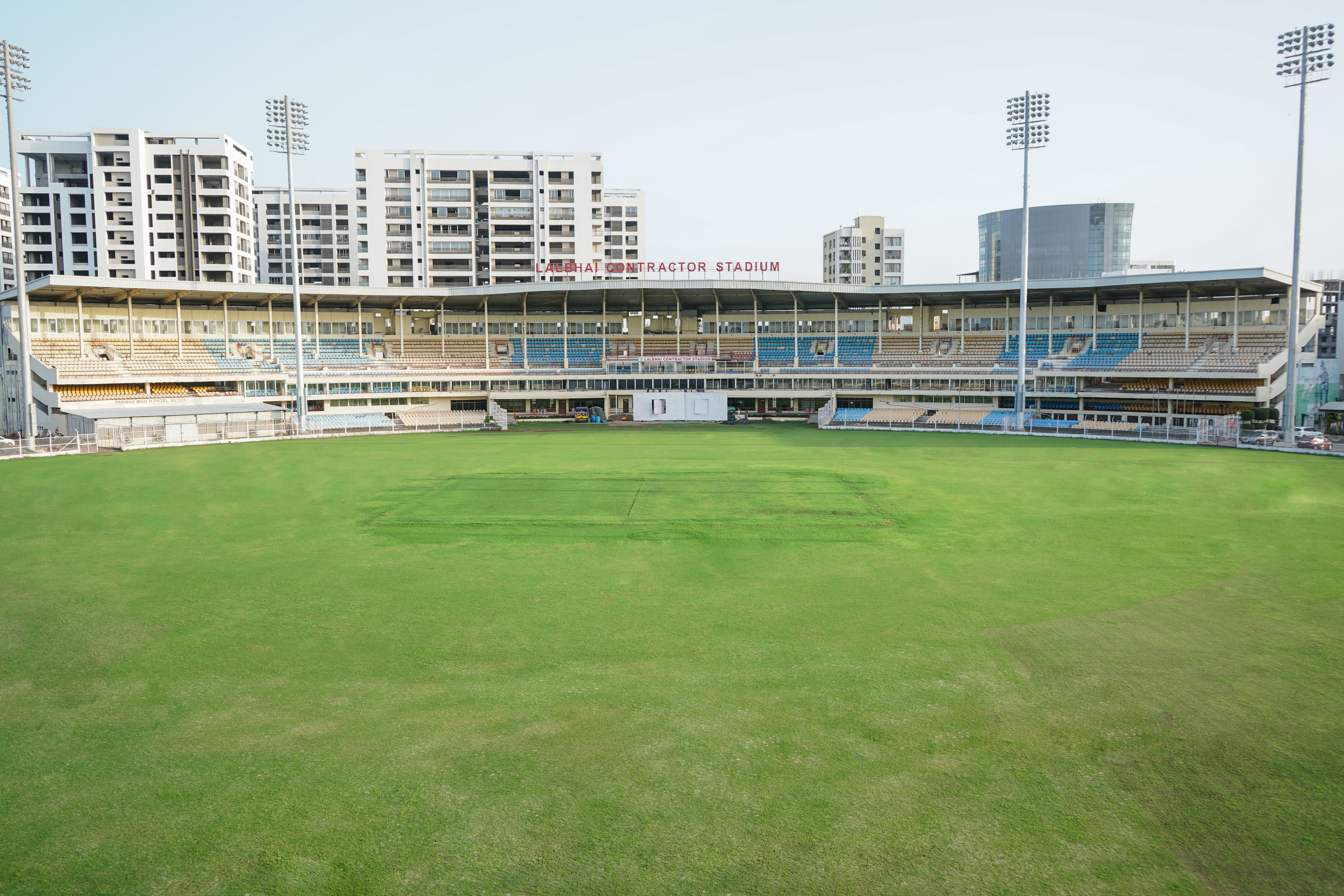
Lalbhai Contractor Stadium

Lalbhai Contractor Cricket Stadium has a capacity of more than 7,000 and has hosted several Ranji, Irani, and Duleep Trophy matches. The stadium is a primary destination for local cricketers and enthusiasts. The stadium has hosted several benefit matches for international cricketers.

== Surat in literature ==
- The Coffee-House of Surat – by Leo Tolstoy
- A Voyage to Surat in the Year 1689 – by John Ovington
- Gazetteer of the Bombay Presidency: Gujarát Surat and Broach
- The Land of Malabar – by Duarte Barbosa
- Plague in Surat: Crisis in Urban Governance – by Archana Ghosh and S. Sami Ahmad
- Surat, Broach and Other Old Cities of Goojerat – by Theodore Hope

== Neighborhoods and localities ==
- Bhimrad
- Kosamba
- Varachha
- Udhana
- Sachin
- Pandesara
- Athwalines

== Notable people ==
- Abbas–Mustan, Bollywood directors
- Hashim Amla, South African cricketer
- Henry Barnes-Lawrence (1815–1896), Anglican clergyman, founder of the Association for the Protection of Sea-Birds
- Chahhyaben Bhuva, politician
- Kiransinh Chauhan, Gujarati poet and scriptwriter
- Abdulgani Dahiwala, Gujarati poet
- Ismail Darbar, Bollywood composer
- Freddy Daruwala, Bollywood actor
- Harmeet Desai, table-tennis player
- Jayant Desai, director
- Prachi Desai, Bollywood actress
- Govind Dholakia, Indian businessman and member of Rajya Sabha
- Savji Dholakia, Indian businessman, founder and chairman of Hari Krishna Exports
- Pratik Gandhi, Bollywood actor
- Jashwant Gangani, writer, director, producer
- Uttamram Ghelabhai, textile merchant, philanthropist
- Yazdi Karanjia, theatre person - noted as one of the doyens of Parsi theatre
- Sanjeev Kumar (actual name Haribhai Jariwala), film actor
- Mareez, twentieth-century Gujarati poet, popular for his ghazals
- Mehtab, actress
- Babubhai Mistry, special effects - Bollywood trick scene photography
- Narmad, Gujarati poet, playwright, essayist, orator, lexicographer and reformer under the British Raj
- Hardik Pandya, Indian international cricketer
- Dhwanil Parekh, twentieth century Gujarati poet
- Mufaddal Saifuddin, religious leader of the Dawoodi Bohra
- Harsh Sanghavi, MLA - Majura constituency and minister of state
- Mathur Savani, businessman and social activist
- Gunvant Shah, educationist and columnist
- Bhagwatikumar Sharma, author and journalist
- Farooq Sheikh, actor and television presenter
- Sultana, actress
- Abid Surti, Indian cartoonist and writer
- Mehul Surti, Indian musician
- Mohammed Surti, Indian National Congress politician
- Rusi Surti, Indian cricketer
- Naval Tata, former chairman of the Tata Group
- Hendrik van Rheede (1636–1691), Dutch botanist and colonial administrator; died off the coast of Mumbai and was buried at the Dutch Cemetery in Surat
- Virji Vora, businessman known as "merchant prince" during Mughal era
- Zubeida, actress

== See also ==
- Dumas Beach
- List of colleges in Surat
- List of tourist attractions in Surat
- Surat BRTS
- Surat high-speed railway station
