= Locho =

Snack food from Gujarat, India

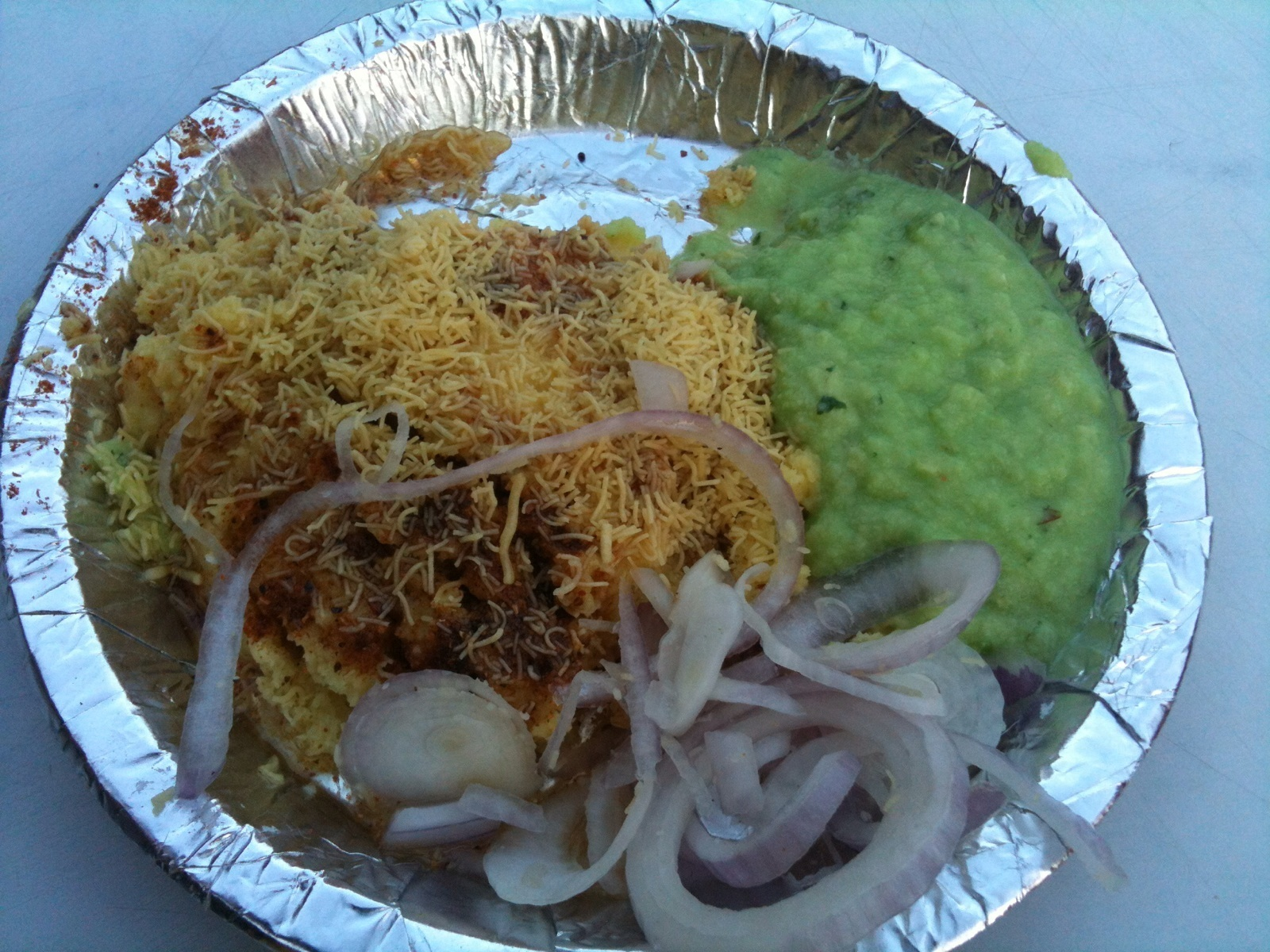
- Locho served with onion rings, chutney and seasoned with sev
- Alternative names: Surati Locho
- Type: Snack
- Place of origin: India
- Region or state: Surat, Gujarat
- Main ingredients: Gram flour, chana dal, salt, spices
- Food energy (per 100 g serving): 75 kcal (310 kJ)
- Similar dishes: Khaman

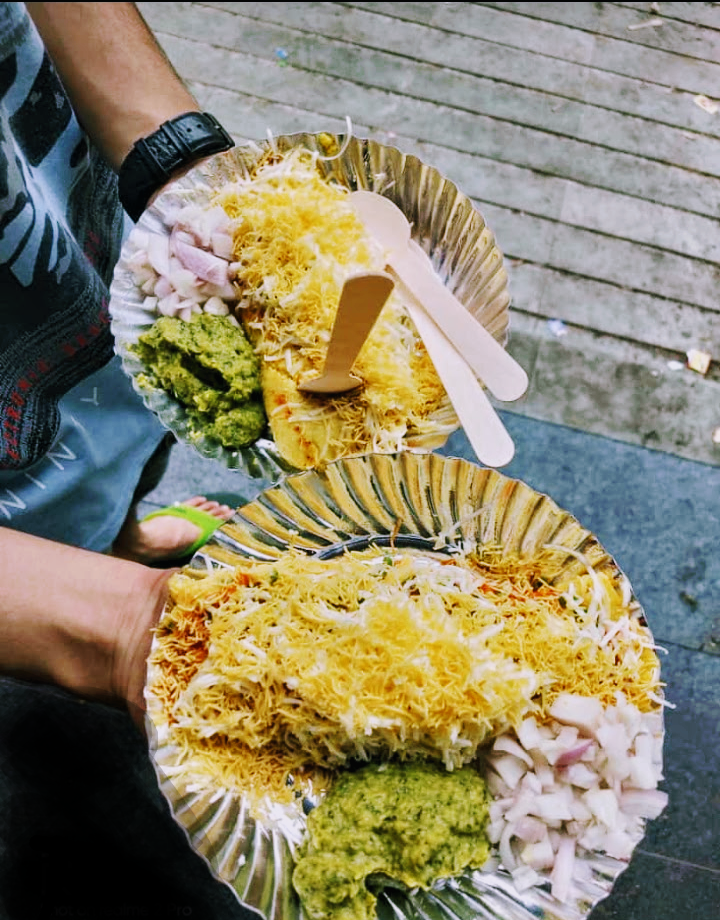
Surati Locho, an Indian dish

Locho is a steamed farsan (snack/side dish) that originated in Surat, Gujarat, India. It is made from gram flour. The dish derives its name from its loose consistency and irregular shape like dumplings. It is somewhat related to Khaman. Unlike Khaman it is not served in regular shaped cut pieces. It is often seasoned with oil, butter, sev, spices, coriander, onion etc.

Locho is widely eaten in Surat. This farsan is popular as Surti Locho. It is also very popular in Navsari and other regions in South Gujarat.
