= Port of Magdalla =

- Interactive map of Port of Magdalla
- Country: India
- State: Gujarat
- District: Surat

Languages
- Time zone: UTC+5:30 (IST)
- STD Code: 0261
- Website: www.surat.nic.in

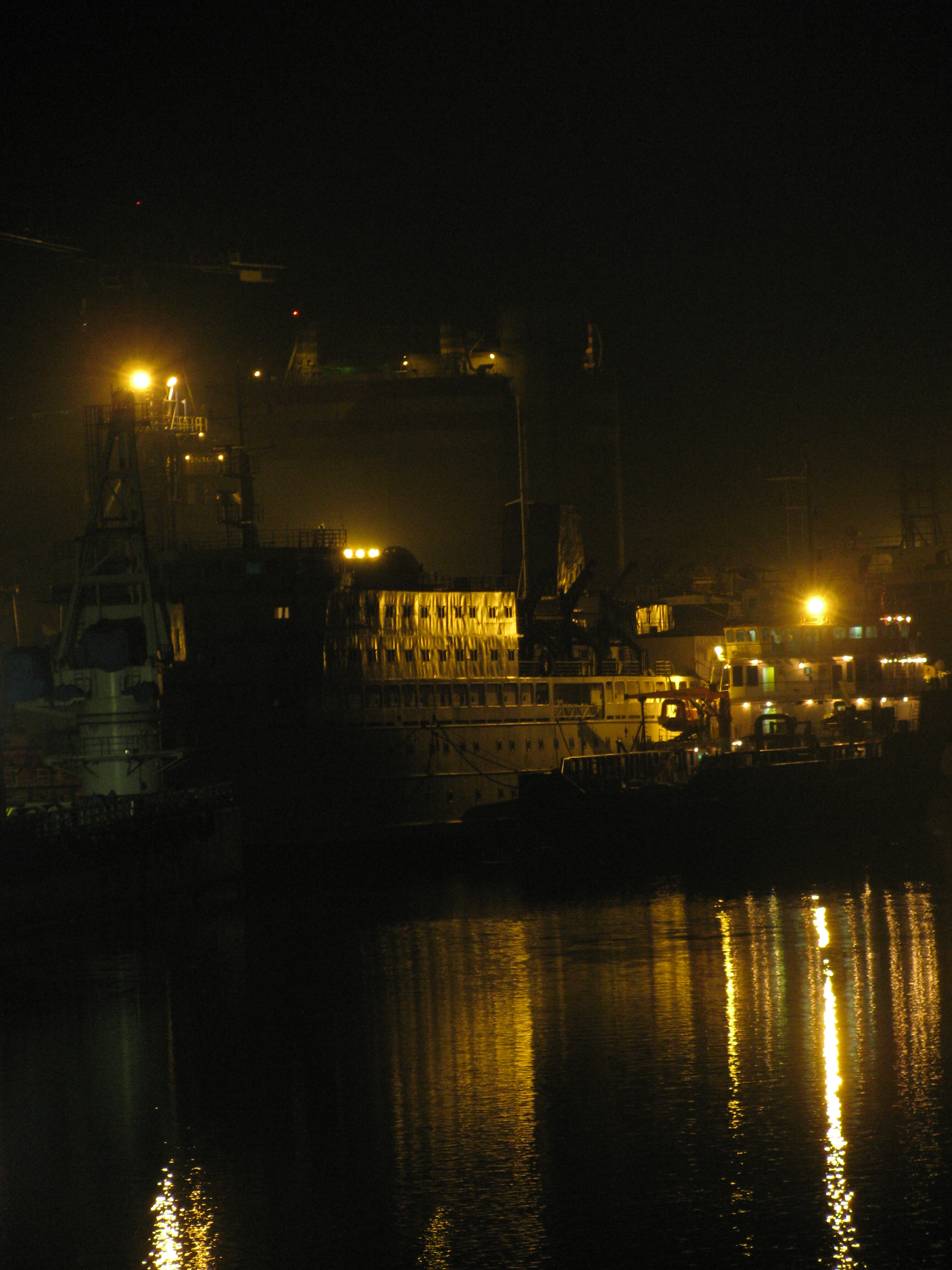
Magdalla Shipyard as seen from ONGC bridge

The Port of Magdalla is a port in western India, located on the southern bank of the Tapi River, around 10 km from Surat. It is operated by Gujarat Maritime Board.

== About the Port ==
It is a medium-sized port. There are various types of vessels regularly approaching Magdalla Port for General Cargo (57%), and Cement Carrier (23%). The maximum length of the vessel recorded to having entered this port is 294 meters. The maximum draught at the port is 4.2 meters. Maximum deadweight is 3872t.

== See also ==
- List of tourist attractions in Surat
- Surat Metropolitan Region
