= Government Medical College, Surat =

Medical college in Surat, Gujarat

- Type: Medical College and Hospital
- Established: 1964; 62 years ago
- Affiliations: National Medical Commission
- Academic affiliations: Veer Narmad South Gujarat University
- Dean: Dr. Jayesh M. Brahmbhatt
- Location: Surat, Gujarat, India
- Website: https://www.gmcsurat.edu.in/

Government Medical College, Surat is a full-fledged Government Medical college. It was established in the year 1964. The college imparts the degree Bachelor of Medicine and Surgery (MBBS). Nursing and para-medical courses are also offered. The college is affiliated to Veer Narmad South Gujarat University and is recognised by National Medical Commission. The hospital associated with the college is one of the largest hospitals in the Surat. The selection to the college is done on the basis of merit through National Eligibility and Entrance Test. Yearly undergraduate student intake is 250.

== Seats ==
=== UG Seats distribution ===
| NO | Course Name | Capacity Per Year | MCI Recognition Status |
|---|---|---|---|
| 1 | MBBS | 100 | Permitted |
| 2 | MBBS | 150 | Recognized |
| 3 | MBBS | 250 | MCI 150 To 250 LOP 1st Letter |
| 3 | MBBS | 250 | MCI 150 To 250 LOP 2nd Letter |
| 3 | MBBS | 250 | MCI 150 To 250 LOP 3rd Letter |

=== PG Seats distribution ===
| PG | Course Name | Capacity Per Year | | Year Of Recognition | MCI Recognition Status |
| PG | Course Name | Degree | Diploma | Year Of Recognition | MCI Recognition Status |
|---|---|---|---|---|---|
| 1 | MD Anatomy | 6 | - | 2013 | Yes |
| 2 | MD Physiology | 5 | - | 2017 | Yes |
| 3 | MD Biochemistry | 3 | - | 2013 | Yes |
| 4 | MD Pathology | 10 | 3 | 2013 | Yes(Degree) Yes(Diploma) |
| 5 | MD Microbiology | 3 | - | 2019 | Yes |
| 6 | MD Pharmacology | 5 | - | 2017 | Yes |
| 7 | MD Forensic Medicine | 2 | - | 2013 | Yes |
| 8 | MD Community Medicine | 7 | 1 | 2013 | Yes |
| 9 | MS Ophthalmology | 7 | - | 2013 | Yes |
| 10 | MS ENT | 5 | - | 2000 | Yes |
| 11 | MD Medicine | 18 | - | 2013 | Yes |
| 12 | MS Surgery | 15 | - | 1984 | Yes |
| 13 | MS Obstetrics and Gynecology | 13 | - | 2013 | Yes |
| 14 | MS Pediatrics | 12 | - | 2013 | Yes |
| 15 | MD Anesthesiology | 18 | - | 2013 | Yes |
| 16 | MD Radiology | 7 | - | 2017 | Yes |
| 17 | IHBT | 2 | - | 2016 | Yes |
| 18 | MD Pulmonary Medicine | 5 | - | 2018 | Yes |
| 19 | MD Dermatology | 4 | - | 2004 | Yes |
| 20 | Emergency Medicine | 2 | - | 2019 | Yes |
| 21 | MS Orthopaedics | 9 | - | 2019 | Yes |
| 22 | MD Psychiatry | 4 | - | 2013 | Yes |
