= Uttamram Ghelabhai =

Singaporean Indian textile merchant and philanthropist

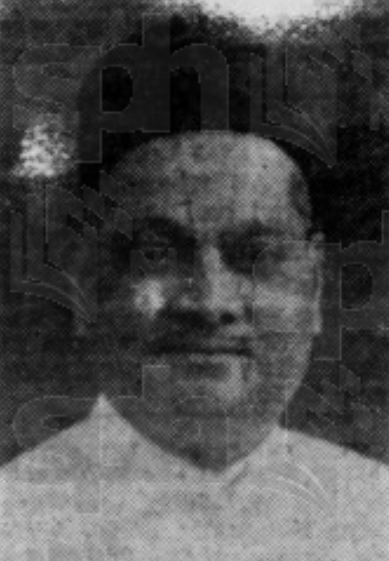
Uttamram in 1951

Uttamram Ghelabhai (1902 – 1981) was a prominent textile merchant and philanthropist in Singapore. A leader of the local Indian community, he served as the Deputy Chairman of the Singapore Indian Chamber of Commerce, the vice-chairman of the Ramakrishna Mission Singapore and as a member of the Hindu Advisory Board. He sat on the council of the Singapore Anti-Tuberculosis Association, to which he donated 6.5 acres of land, and was a member of the Singapore Harbour Board

== Early life ==
Uttamram, a member of the Khatri caste, was born in the city of Surat in Gujarat, British Raj (present-day India) in 1902. He came to Singapore in 1916 at the age of 14. After arriving, he began working at Maganlal Nagindas & Co., a textile firm located on North Bridge Road. In 1921, he became a partner in the business.

== Career ==
In 1931, Uttamram established his own textile firm, Uttamram & Co., which operated out of Arab Street. He imported textiles from India. As the business grew, he opened offices in Penang, Java, Hong Kong and Japan. It was later renamed Uttaram (Singapore) & Co. In February 1936, Uttamram was elected a committee member of the Singapore Indian Chamber of Commerce. In March 1937, he was elected the chamber's honorary auditor. He was elected the Deputy Chairman of the chamber later at an extraordinary general meeting in October. In November 1938, Uttamram was elected a member of the managing committee of the Singapore Indian Association. In November 1939, he acted as the Indian Chamber of Commerce's Chairman. Uttamram was elected a member of the chamber's managerial committee in May 1941 with Maganlal Gangaram being elected Deputy Chairman instead.

In May 1947, it was decided at a meeting of the Indian Chamber of Commerce that the formation of an India Club in Singapore was to begin immediately. Uttamram was elected a member of the club's five-man executive committee. On 15 May of the following year, he was elected a member of the Advisory Committee to the Ramakrishna Mission Singapore. In 1949, Uttamram was appointed to the council of the Singapore Anti-Tuberculosis Association. In November 1951, he was appointed to the newly-established Public Assistance Board, formed by the government to advise on public assistance, working in conjunction with the Social Welfare Department. By April 1953, Uttamram had become a member of the Far Eastern Relief Fund Committee, the Singapore branch of the British Red Cross Society and the St. John Council for Singapore, and a trustee of the Singapore Gujarati School. In June 1955, he was appointed a member of the Hindu Advisory Board for a three-year term, which was to end on 17 March 1958. He was re-appointed a member of the Singapore Rent Control Board on 20 October. In May 1956, he was appointed to the committee of the Singapore Hospital Board. By 1960, he had been elected the vice-chairman of the Singapore Anti-Tuberculosis Association. He was re-elected vice-chairman in May of that year.

In June 1961, the Singapore North Indian Hindu Association appointed Uttamram the chairman of a 21-man committee which was to oversee the construction of the Shree Lakshminarayan Temple on Chander Road. He had laid the temple's foundation stone in November of the previous year. He was re-appointed in October to the Hindu Advisory Board as a member for another three-year term. In November, he was elected a vice-president of the Advisory Committee to the Ramakrishna Mission Singapore, along with Vayloo Pakirisamy Pillai and P. Govindasamy Pillai. Uttamram continued to serve on the Singapore Harbour Board and the Hindu Advisory Board until 1963 and 1965 respectively. In July 1979, he was re-elected to the committee of the Singapore Anti-Tuberculosis Association as a member instead of vice-chairman.

== Personal life, philanthropy and death ==
Uttamram married before coming to Singapore. After he was employed at Maganlal Nagindas & Co., he returned to India and brought her to Singapore. They had five sons and two daughters. Though he only received a basic education, he was reportedly "extremely well-read and knowledgeable." A Hindu, Uttamram was "deeply religious". He lived in a shophouse on Arab Street.

A philanthropist, he presented a $25,000 cheque to Malcolm MacDonald, then chancellor of the University of Malaya, at a party celebrating the 20th anniversary of Uttaram (Singapore) & Co. in June 1951. The funds were to be used to establish an Indian arts and culture library at the university. At the same party, he presented a $20,000 cheque to Charles L. Edwards, then the chairman of the Singapore Anti-Tuberculosis Association, in support of the association. In April 1952, Uttamram reportedly promised to donate a statue of Mahatma Gandhi to the Mahatma Gandhi Memorial Hall, to be installed upon its completion. He was to select the statue on a trip to India. Uttamram donated $3,000 to the Ramakrishna Mission in June 1954 to fund the renovation of its boys' orphanage home on Bartley Road. He also donated to the Anglo-Chinese Junior College.

In August 1954, Uttamram announced at a dinner which he organised in honour of Vijaya Lakshmi Pandit on her trip to Malaya that he would be giving 6.3 acres of land in Siglap along Upper Changi Road, which was then occupied by an orchard and a coconut plantation, as a commemoration of Pandit's visit to the region. He claimed that when he had acquired the land in 1931, he made a "promise to God" that it would be donated to charity, and that he had been offered $148,000 for the land in 1951. He suggested that a branch clinic of the association be built on the land as he believed that the existing clinic at Shenton Way was "too far" for residents of Geylang and Siglap. However, the land was later found to be too large. Only around 0.6 hectares was used to build the clinic, named the SATA Uttamram Chest Clinic, while the rest of the land was returned to Uttamram. Eventually, the remaining land was acquired by the government.

Uttamram died in Singapore in 1981.
