= Surat zari =

Textile made from yarns of silk and cotton mixed with gold, silver or copper

- Geographical indication
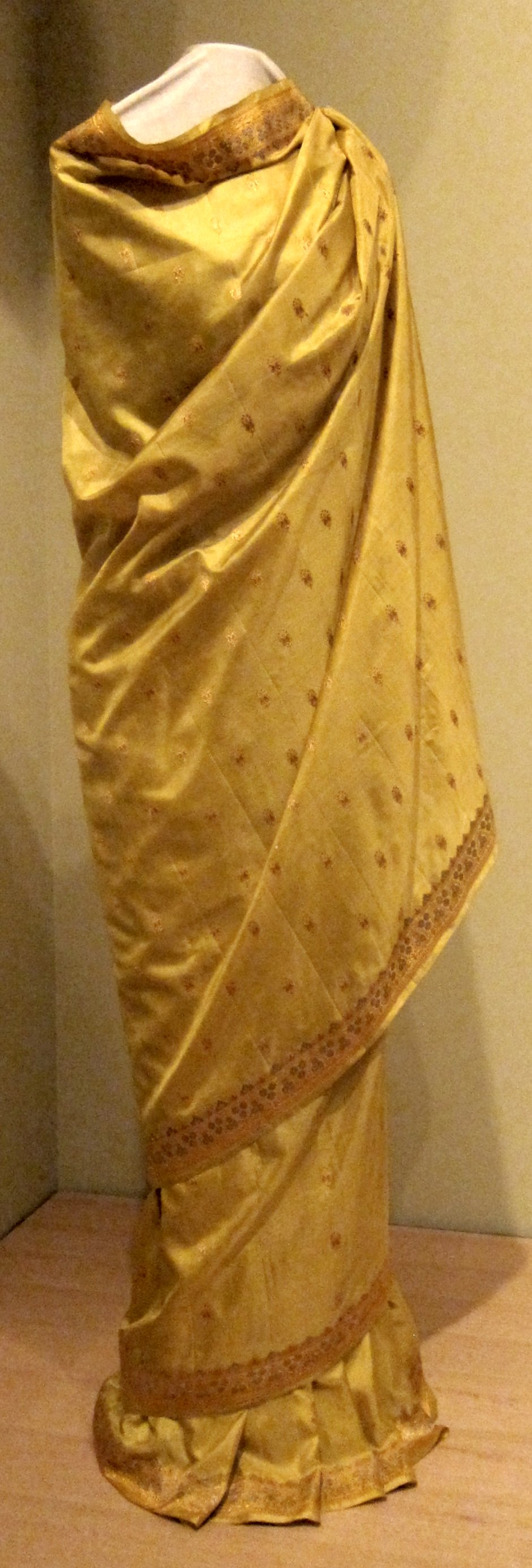
- Sari made with zari
- Description: Textile signature art tradition of Surat district
- Type: Textile art
- Area: Surat City
- Country: India
- Registered: 2010
- Material: Gold and silver threads on silk cloth

The Surat zari or Surat jari is a textile product of Surat district in Gujarat, India made from yarns of silk and cotton mixed with gold, silver or copper. The zari threads are used to make intricate designs by weaving into generally silk fabrics. Its use is extensive in textile industries and handicrafts. Surat zari is either woven on cloth or hand embroidered to form fabric borders or used as part on the body of the cloth. Zari is used in fabrics made in Varanasi and a few other places in Uttar Pradesh, Tamil Nadu, Karnataka and Andhra Pradesh. Banarasi saris made in Varanasi and Kanjivaram Saris of South India use Surat zari extensively.

The zari made in Surat are of two types - metallic zari made with gold and pure metals, and imitation zari woven with plastics.

== Location ==
The zari making centers are located in Surat district in Southern Gujarat, within the geographical limits of 20°47′00″N 72°21′00″E and 21°34′00″N 74°20′00″E. This district is delimited on the north by the Bharuch district, on the south by the Navsari district, on the east by the Tapi district of Gujarat and on the west by the Arabian Sea. However, 95% of the zari manufacturing units are located within the Surat city. Within the Surat city, the suburbs where craftsmen are involved with the production of zari are Gopipura, Mahidharpura, Navapura, Sagrampura, Saiyedpura, Rampura, Udhana, and Wadifalia.

== History ==
The origin of making zari in not exactly known. However, some of ancient Hindu literature such as Ramayana, Mahabharata, and Rigveda do mention about it. In ancient history of the third century BC related to Megasthenes, there is mention of a fabric made in gold. During Mughal rule the fabric became popular in Surat, with the city being named as "Zari City". During the Mughal period, zari brocades were popular among the pilgrims who stayed in Surat on their way to Mecca. Gold and silver threads and related products were exported from Surat to several countries. In the period of British rule zari manufacturing was promoted but was only second in ranking to France which produced it using textile machinery. However, domination of France industry reduced during World War I to the advantage of Surat's zari industry.

The zari made before 19th century used pure metals such as gold, silver, etc., which was called "true zari" locally called pasa. The process involved covering silver with a coating of gold and then drawing fine wires of different gauges, termed locally as “badla”, which was then hand woven over the base yarn of pure silk, called "asara", to make the zari. In Surat workers in these trades were often with the surnames of Jariwala and Asarawala. There were no innovations to this method in the 19th century. In the twentieth century modernization came into vogue with introduction of textile machinery to draw silver and use of Rubby dyes invented in India. However, subsequent to the Second World War imitation zari was also manufactured, in addition to real zari. The imitation zari was made with plastic as base metal in 1970.

According to a survey, Surat has about 500 manufacturing units, in addition to 3,000 small household units involved in manufacture of three types of zari - the real Zari, imitation Zari and plastic Zari.

== Product details ==
Zari industry produces both pure or real zari and imitation zari in several units. The process involves procurement of raw materials and different types of processing for the real zari and imitation zari. The materials procured are bars of copper, gold, silver, pure silk, art silk, polyester, viscous and cotton threads of different counts, and chemicals such as potassium cyanide, oxitol, cyclohexanone, and different types of colours. Real zari manufacture is a six-stage process. This process produces flat silver-wires known as "Badla", which is then woven over threads of art-silk or cotton or on other types of yarn as the base with the help of a winding machine which results in zari thread called the silver coloured “Ruperi Zari Thread”. This is then taken through a solution of gold in an electroplating plant to produce “Gold thread,” which is then marketed.

In the case of imitation zari the production process is of six stages but the metal used in copper wire of specified thickness. The product at the sixth stage is gilded imitation zari thread which is "wound on reel or on hand charkha for making small skeins of 5gms to 10gms". Locally made wire drawing machines are adopted for drawing wires, and then subject to a wire electroplating process in silver solution and then "Tania units of specified gauge are used to pull "through various ruby dies." The wire thus drawn is made flat and weaved through the art silk or cotton yarn to produce "Imitation or Half-fine zari threads".

Surat zari is considered unique in the world due to the geo-climatic conditions of the region, the silver electroplating process, materials used, type of indigenous machinery adopted and the skill of the artisans."

== Geographical Indication ==
Surat zari is protected under the Geographical Indications of Goods (Registration & Protection) Act (GI Act) 1999 of the Government of India. It was registered by the Controller General of Patents Designs and Trademarks under the title "Surat Zari Craft" and recorded at GI Application number 131 under Class 31 as a horticulture item. The GI tag was approved in 2010. According to the Federation of Indian Chambers of Commerce & Industry (FICCI) the GI status is stated to benefit 150,000 stakeholders involved with Surat's Zari craft.

== Quality control ==
The agenizes involved in quality control are the Department of Handicrafts, Government of Gujarat, and the Development Commissioner (Handicraft), Government of India.
