= Chahhyaben Bhuva =

Indian politician

Deputy Mayor of Surat Municipal Corporation
- In office 2010–2012

Personal details
- Born: Surat, India
- Party: Bhartiya Janata Party
- Profession: Politician

Chahhyaben Bhuva is a Bharatiya Janata Party politician. He was counsellor at Surat Municipal Corporation and between 2010 and 2012 Deputy Mayor of Surat, India.
