= Institute of Social Sciences, New Delhi =

Indian research institute

The Institute of Social Sciences studies social, political and economic issues of contemporary relevance. It provides inputs to the policy makers and civil society organisations.

The institute has established the Centre for Multilevel Federalism (CMF) for the study of federalism in India.
