= Browns Creek =

Browns Creek, Brown's Creek, or Brown Creek may refer to:

- Browns Creek (Huntsville Creek), in Luzerne County, Pennsylvania
- Browns Creek Township, Red Lake County, Minnesota
- Browns Canyon Wash, a tributary of the Los Angeles River
- Brown's Creek (St. Croix River) a tributary of the St. Croix River in Minnesota
- Browns Creek (Cape Fear River tributary), a stream in Bladen County, North Carolina
- Brown Creek, a stream in Pennsylvania
- Browns Creek (South Carolina)
- Browns Creek (Henderson County, Tennessee)
- Browns Creek (Utah), a stream in Utah
