= Toby Creek =

River in the United States of America

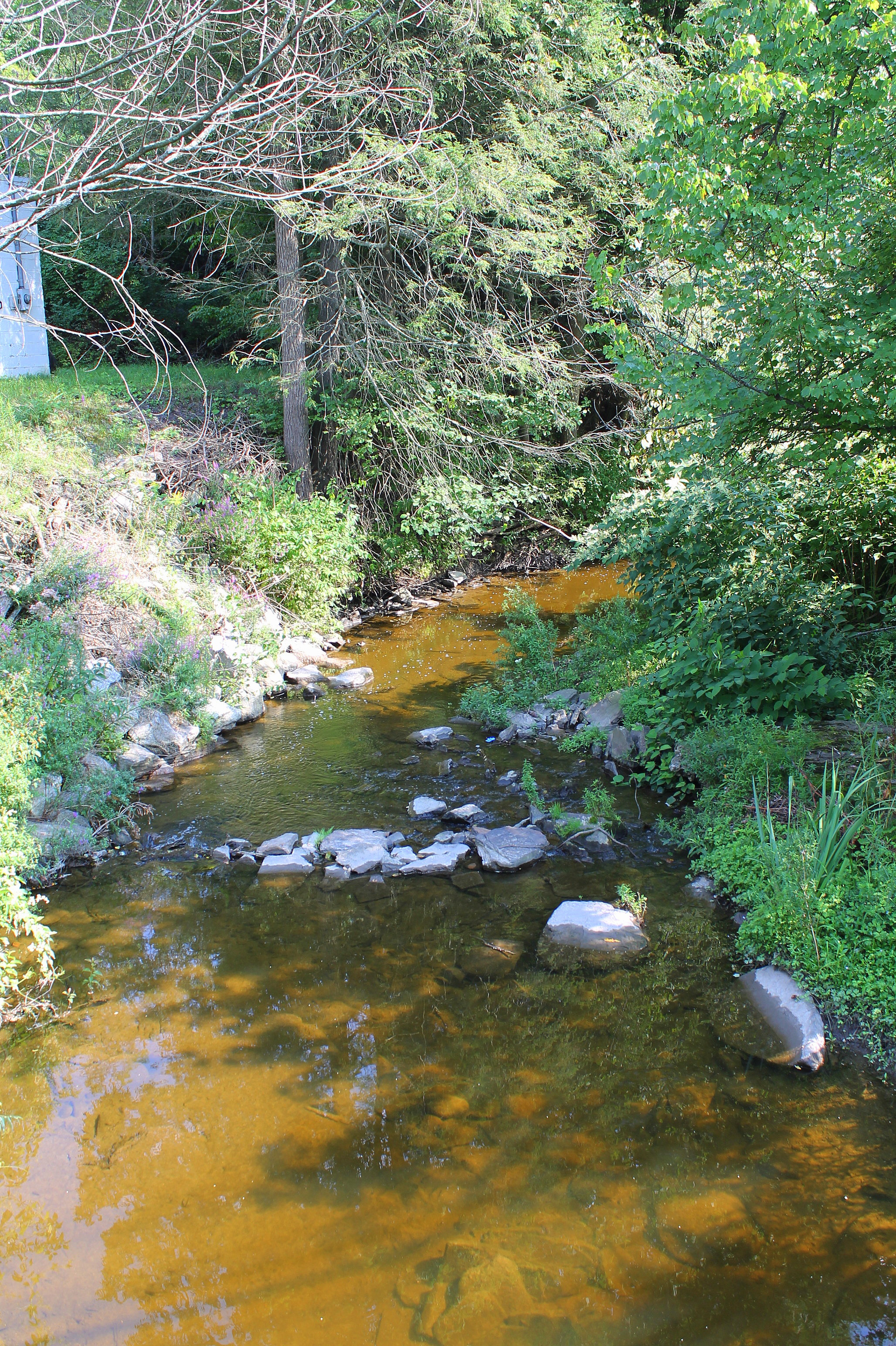
- Toby Creek looking upstream

Physical characteristics
- Source
  - location: Dallas Township, Luzerne County, Pennsylvania
  - elevation: between 1,220 and 1,240 feet (370 and 380 m)
- Mouth
  - location: Susquehanna River in Edwardsville, Luzerne County, Pennsylvania and Larksville, Luzerne County, Pennsylvania
  - coordinates: 41°15′05″N 75°54′42″W
  - elevation: 518 ft (158 m)
- Basin size: 36.5 sq mi (95 km^{2})
- Discharge
  - average: 41.2 cu ft/s (1.17 m^{3}/s)

Basin features
- Progression: Susquehanna River → Chesapeake Bay
- Tributaries
  - left: Trout Brook
  - right: Huntsville Creek

Toby Creek (also known as Toby's Creek) is a tributary of the Susquehanna River in Luzerne County, Pennsylvania, in the United States. It is approximately 10.5 miles (16.9 km) long and flows through Dallas Township, Dallas, Kingston Township, Courtdale, Luzerne, Pringle, Kingston, Edwardsville, and Larksville. The watershed of the creek has an area of 36.5 square miles (95 km^{2}). The entire drainage basin is designated as a Migratory Fishery and parts are designated as either a Coldwater Fishery, a Warmwater Fishery, or a Trout Stocking Fishery. The creek has two named tributaries: Huntsville Creek and Trout Brook. It is said to show "some degraded conditions", but does not experience severe pollution and is not considered to be impaired. The creek is piped underground in Pringle, but resurfaces in Edwardsville.

The watershed of Toby Creek occupies part or all of ten boroughs and four townships. The creek's watershed is mainly rural. Pennsylvania Route 309, Pennsylvania Route 118, and US Route 11 are partially within it. The two-billion-gallon Huntsville Reservoir is also in the creek's drainage basin. Several mills were built along the creek in the 1800s and many bridges have been constructed over it. The creek experienced significant floods in 1942 and 1972.

== Course ==
Toby Creek begins in Dallas Township. It flows south-southeast for a short distance before turning south and then southeast. The creek then flows east-southeast alongside Pennsylvania Route 415 for a few miles, passing through Dallas on the way. It then crosses Pennsylvania Route 309 and enters Dallas Township. At this point, it turns east for a few tenths of a mile and receives the tributary Trout Brook from the left. The creek then turns south and slightly east for a few miles, flowing not far from Pennsylvania Route 309 and entering Kingston Township. It then turns south-southeast, crossing Pennsylvania Route 309 and receiving the tributary Huntsville Creek from the right. At this point, the creek enters a water gap, flowing very close to Pennsylvania Route 309. After several tenths of a mile, it gradually turns northeast and then turns south-southeast, briefly passing through Courtdale and into Luzerne, where it exits the water gap. After several tenths of a mile, the creek turns south, crossing Pennsylvania Route 309 and entering Pringle, where it disappears from the surface. The creek reappears in Edwardsville and flows west for a few tenths of a mile before turning south and then south-southwest. Several tenths of a mile further downstream, it reaches its confluence with the Susquehanna River on the border between Edwardsville and Larksville.

Toby Creek joins the Susquehanna River 187.79 miles (302.22 km) upriver of its mouth.

=== Tributaries ===
Toby Creek has two named tributaries: Huntsville Creek and Trout Brook. Huntsville Creek joins Toby Creek 5.04 miles (8.11 km) upstream of its mouth. Its watershed has an area of 14.7 square miles (38 km^{2}). Trout Brook joins Toby Creek 7.60 miles (12.23 km) upstream of its mouth. Its watershed has an area of 4.20 square miles (10.9 km^{2}).

== Hydrology ==
The lower reaches of Toby Creek were polluted by coal mining waste in the early 1900s. However, in modern times, no part of the watershed of Toby Creek is considered to be impaired. It has been described as showing "some degraded conditions", but does not rank among the most polluted watersheds in the Middle Susquehanna Subbasin. However, the creek has high levels of nutrients and sodium. There is one combined sewer overflow in the watershed, near the mouth of the creek.

The discharge of Toby Creek in its lower reaches is lowest in August and September, when it averages 15 and 19 cubic feet per second. In July and October, the average discharge is also relatively low (22 and 21 cubic feet per second, respectively). The highest average discharges occur in April and March: 83 and 82 cubic feet per second, respectively. The highest average monthly discharge between 1941 and 1993 was 269.3 cubic feet per second, in April 1993. However, during severe floods, the discharge can top 3000 cubic feet per second. The lowest recorded average monthly discharge during that time, 3.00 cubic feet per second, occurred in September 1951. The average discharge of the creek between 1941 and 1993 was 41.2 cubic feet per second. The gage height of the creek between 1986 and 1993 ranged from 0.25 to 1.46 feet (0.076 to 0.445 m), but can be over 4 to 6 feet (1.2 to 1.8 m) during severe floods.

The turbidity of Toby Creek ranges from 1 to 150 JTU. The creek's specific conductance ranges from 70 to 210 micro-siemens per centimeter at 25 °C (77 °F). This value was historically somewhat higher. The creek is very slightly alkaline, with an average pH of 7.1. Its pH ranges from 6.4 to 7.7. The concentration of water hardness in the creek's waters ranges from 26 to 84 milligrams per liter (0.026 to 0.084 oz/cu ft).

The concentration of dissolved oxygen in the waters of Toby Creek ranges from 9.1 to 13.6 milligrams per liter (0.0091 to 0.0136 oz/cu ft) and is typically over 10 milligrams per liter (0.0100 oz/cu ft). The concentration of carbon dioxide in the waters of the creek ranges from 0.9 to 12 milligrams per liter (0.00090 to 0.01199 oz/cu ft) and the ammonia concentration ranges from 0.05 to 0.76 milligrams per liter (5.0×10^{−5} to 0.000759 oz/cu ft) per liter. The nitrite concentration ranges from 0.048 to 0.124 milligrams per liter (4.8×10^{−5} to 0.000124 oz/cu ft) and the nitrate concentration ranges from 0.94 to 1.60 milligrams per liter (0.00094 to 0.00160 oz/cu ft). The phosphorus concentration ranges between 0.06 and 0.62 milligrams per liter (6.0×10^{−5} and 0.000619 oz/cu ft). The concentration of chloride ranges from 7 to 25 milligrams per liter (0.0070 to 0.0250 oz/cu ft) and the sulfate concentration ranges from 2 to 24 milligrams per liter (0.0020 to 0.0240 oz/cu ft). The average concentration of total dissolved solids in the creek is 117 milligrams per liter (0.117 oz/cu ft), but this was historically slightly higher. A total of 10,200 tons of dissolved solids flow through the creek per day.

The calcium concentration in the waters of Toby Creek ranges from 8.8 to 152 micrograms per liter (8.8×10^{−6} to 0.0001518 oz/cu ft) and the magnesium concentration ranges from 1 to 13 micrograms per liter (1.00×10^{−6} to 1.299×10^{−5} oz/cu ft). The concentration of recoverable iron in the creek ranges from 20 to 21,000 micrograms per liter (2.0×10^{−5} to 0.020976 oz/cu ft) and the concentration of recoverable aluminum was once measured to be 12,000 milligrams per liter (12 oz/cu ft). The concentrations of chromium and copper were both once measured to be 20 micrograms per liter (2.0×10^{−5} oz/cu ft) and the arsenic concentration was measured to be 1 microgram per liter (1.00×10^{−6} oz/cu ft). The manganese and zinc concentrations were once measured to be 520 and 70 micrograms per liter (0.000519 and 7.0×10^{−5} oz/cu ft).

== Geography, geology, and climate ==
The elevation near the mouth of Toby Creek is 518 feet (158 m) above sea level. The elevation of the creek's source is between 1,220 and 1,240 feet (370 and 380 m) above sea level. Its gradient is relatively low. In its upper 8 miles (13 km), the creek's elevation decreases at a rate of 92.5 feet (28.2 m) per mile. In its lower 3 miles (4.8 km), its elevation decreases at a rate of 24 feet (7.3 m) per mile.

Toby Creek passes through a gorge between Trucksville and Luzerne. Downstream of Luzerne, it flows through broad bottom lands. The creek is surrounded by steep slopes in the borough of Courtdale. The topography of the creek's watershed is described as "rough and hilly" in a 1921 book. The watershed has been affected by glaciation.

The channel of Toby Creek is sinuous. Rock formations consisting of sandstone and shale occur in its vicinity. There are also coal deposits along the creek in its lower reaches. Rocks of the Chemung Formation occur in the vicinity of Toby Creek. The bedrock is 4.4 feet (1.3 m) underground in some areas of the watershed.

A large impounding basin diverts water away from Kingston and Pringle. The creek is then piped via gravity into a "massive" underground pipe for some distance. The creek resurfaces in Edwardsville. There is also a pressure conduit on the creek. A levee is situated on the creek in Edwardsville Township, as are flumes and conduits. It is protected by riprap in Dallas Township. The creek is channelized for much of its length and has been relocated in places.

In the uppermost 31.8 square miles (82 km^{2}) of the watershed of Toby Creek, the annual rate of precipitation ranges from 35 to 50.4 inches (89 to 128 cm), with an average of 40.6 inches (103 cm). The waters of the creek at one site have a velocity of 10.7 feet (3.3 m) per second. The water temperature was measured several times between January and August 1976. In January, February, and March, it ranged from 0.0 to 5.0 °C (32.0 to 41.0 °F).

== Watershed ==
The watershed of Toby Creek has an area of 36.5 square miles (95 km^{2}). The watershed is situated in north-central Luzerne County. The creek is entirely within the United States Geological Survey quadrangle of Kingston. The stream density of the uppermost 31.8 square miles (82 km^{2}) of the watershed is 1.6 miles (2.6 km) per 1 square mile (2.6 km^{2}). A total of 59.7 percent of this segment of the watershed is forested and 17.7 percent is urban.

Toby Creek's watershed is in part or all of 14 municipalities. It is in ten boroughs: Swoyersville, Pringle, Luzerne, Larksville, Kingston, Harveys Lake, Fort Fort, Edwardsville, Dallas, and Courtdale. It is also in four townships: Lehman Township, Kingston Township, Jackson Township, and Dallas Township. It is adjacent to watersheds such as those of Harveys Creek and Abrahams Creek. A 9-mile (15-kilometer) long stretch of land along the main stem of Toby Creek is highly urbanized. This stretch of land begins in Dallas, near the creek's headwaters, and passes through Shavertown, Luzerne, Kingston, and Edwardsville. Both the Back Mountain and Endless Mountain regions are associated with the creek's watershed and are adjacent to it.

The watershed of Toby Creek is predominantly rural. Most of it (61.3 percent) is forested land. Considerably less common are grassland (19.6 percent) and urban land (16.4 percent). A total of 2.1 percent of the creek's watershed consists of wetlands and 0.6 percent consists of mining lands. The mining land is confined to one area near the mouth of the creek.

The watershed of Toby Creek is very narrow in its lower reaches. However, it becomes much broader in its middle and upper reaches. The watershed is developed. The number of employees in the creek's drainage basin is expected to increase until 2030. Pennsylvania Route 309 runs through the watershed in a north–south direction. Pennsylvania Route 118 is in the watershed's northwestern portion and US Route 11 passes through its southernmost part.

A total of 4.03 million gallons of water per day are withdrawn from Toby Creek and its tributaries. 3.38 million gallons per day (84 percent) are removed by registered water suppliers and 0.51 million gallons per day (13 percent) are removed for commercial and industrial purposes. 0.10 million gallons per day (2 percent) are removed for mineral purposes and 0.04 million gallons per day (1 percent) are removed for residential purposes. A reservoir known as the Huntsville Reservoir is located in the watershed of Toby Creek. It has a capacity of approximately 1.915 billion gallons.

Toby Creek is the main source of flooding in Courtdale, Dallas, Luzerne, Pringle, and Kingston Township. It is also one of the main sources of flooding in the borough of Kingston. However, the creek's floods cause little damage in Courtdale, since its floodplain is relatively undeveloped in that borough. The creek has an Act 167 Stormwater Management Plan.

There are numerous swamps, lakes, and ponds in the watershed of Toby Creek.

== History ==
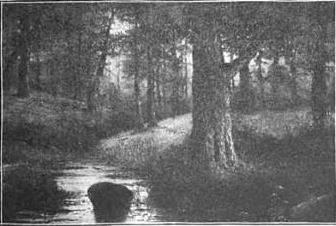
Toby Creek in the late 1800s or early 1900s

Toby Creek was entered into the Geographic Names Information System on August 2, 1979. Its identifier in the Geographic Names Information System is 1189612.

An ancient fortification is located on a plain near Toby Creek in Kingston Township. The fort is elliptical and measures 337 by 272 feet (103 by 83 m). It is 150 feet (46 m) from the creek and 0.5 miles (0.80 km) from the Susquehanna River.

In the beginning of the 1800s, there were no roads going through the valley of Toby Creek. However, one was built by the late 1800s or early 1900s. Peter Grubb operated a gristmill and sawmill on Toby Creek in the late 1700s and/or early 1800s. They were the only gristmill and sawmill that were ever built in Kingston up to 1893. The later came to be owned by Thomas Borbidge, who tore them down in 1826. In 1812, a Mr. Buckingham, a Mr. Carbon, a Mr. Tuttle, and a Mr. Parker constructed a paper mill on Toby Creek. Later, in 1836, George W. Little built a small charcoal furnace on the creek at the site of the paper mill. Jude Baldwin constructed a mill on the creek in 1813. In 1847, Miner Fuller built another mill approximately 0.5 miles (0.80 km) further upstream. Both were torn down in the late 1800s since they were no longer needed. In the early 1900s, the main industries in the watershed were agriculture and coal mining. The creek was also used as water power for several mills. Around this time, the Lehigh Valley Railroad crossed the watershed, following the creek for its entire length. The Delaware, Lackawanna, and Western Railroad followed also traversed the watershed and followed the creek in its lower reaches.

The two most severe floods in the watershed of Toby Creek occurred on December 30, 1942, and June 22, 1972. During these floods there were peak discharges of 3,010 and 3,390 cubic feet per second (85 and 96 m^{3}/s), respectively. The gage heights reached 4.8 and 6.1 feet (1.5 and 1.9 m).

Numerous bridges have been built over Toby Creek. One was built in 1920 and repaired in 1989. Another was built in 1928 and repaired in 1963 and a third was built in 1939. Six bridges were built over the creek in 1941, all of them in Kingston Township or Dallas Township. Another bridge was built over Toby Creek in 1955 and four more were built in 1963, one of which was repaired in 1988. One was built in 1970 and repaired in 1980 and another was built in 1976 and repaired in 1997. Two more bridges were built across the creek in 1980, one more in 1984, and one in 1989.

The streambank of Toby Creek underwent a stabilization project after 2005.

== Biology ==
The drainage basin of Toby Creek upstream of the tributary Huntsville Creek is designated as a Coldwater Fishery and a Migratory Fishery. From below Huntsville Creek downstream to Pringle, where Toby Creek disappears from the surface, Toby Creek and its drainage basin are designated as a Trout Stocking Fishery and a Migratory Fishery. From that point downstream to the creek's mouth, the drainage basin is designated as a Warmwater Fishery. (Note: See § 93.3 of Chapter 25 of the Pennsylvania Code for definitions.) Wild trout naturally reproduce in the creek from its headwaters downstream to its mouth.

The concentration of fecal coliform bacteria in the waters of Toby Creek was once measured to be 1000 colonies per 100 millilitres (3.5 imp fl oz; 3.4 US fl oz).

Out of a number of stream segments studied by the Susquehanna River Basin Commission, a section of Toby Creek was found to be the poorest habitat. Specific problems faced by the creek at this site include embeddedness, a lack of riffles, poor epifaunal substrate, low instream cover, low-quality streambanks, and sediment deposition. The borough of Dallas has plans to construct a greenway along the creek.

== See also ==
- Brown Creek, next tributary on the west side of the Susquehanna River going downriver (Note: Shupps Creek is a tributary between Toby Creek and Brown Creek.)
- Mill Creek (Susquehanna River), next tributary of the Susquehanna River going upriver
- List of rivers of Pennsylvania
