= Browns Creek (Huntsville Creek tributary) =

Physical characteristics
- Source
  - location: valley in Lehman Township, Luzerne County, Pennsylvania
  - elevation: between 1,120 and 1,140 feet (340 and 350 m)
- Mouth
  - location: Huntsville Creek in Jackson Township, Luzerne County, Pennsylvania
  - coordinates: 41°17′40″N 75°56′49″W
  - elevation: 919 ft (280 m)
- Length: 3.6 mi (5.8 km)
- Basin size: 3.86 mi^{2} (10.0 km^{2})

Basin features
- Progression: Huntsville Creek → Toby Creek → Susquehanna River → Chesapeake Bay
- Tributaries
  - left: one unnamed tributary

Browns Creek (also known as Brown's Creek) is a tributary of Huntsville Creek in Luzerne County, Pennsylvania, in the United States. It is approximately 3.6 miles (5.8 km) long and flows through Lehman Township and Jackson Township. The watershed of the creek has an area of 3.86 square miles (10.0 km^{2}). The watershed is less developed than that of Toby Creek, but is beginning to urbanize. Wisconsinan Till, Wisconsinan Ice-Contact Stratified Drift, alluvium, sandstone and shale pits, and bedrock consisting of sandstone and shale all occur in the watershed.

== Course ==
Browns Creek begins in a valley in Lehman Township, to the southwest of the Huntsville Reservoir. It flows south-southeast for more than a mile, entering Jackson Township, and its valley becomes slightly deeper. At the border of Chase, the creek turns east-northeast and begins flowing along the border. After several tenths of a mile, it receives an unnamed tributary from the left. A short distance further downstream, the creek turns east-southeast. It then turns east-northeast. After several tenths of a mile, it reaches its confluence with Huntsville Creek.

Browns Creek joins Huntsville Creek 1.20 miles (1.93 km) upstream of its mouth.

== Hydrology ==
Browns Creek is not considered to be impaired.

The peak annual discharge of Browns Creek has a 10 percent chance of reaching 500 cubic feet per second. It has a 2 percent chance of reaching 850 cubic feet per second and a 1 percent chance of reaching 1030 cubic feet per second. The peak annual discharge has a 0.2 percent chance of reaching 1520 cubic feet per second.

== Geography and geology ==
The elevation near the mouth of Browns Creek is 919 feet (280 m) above sea level. The elevation of the creek's source is between 1,120 and 1,140 feet (340 and 350 m) above sea level.

The surficial geology in the vicinity of Browns Creek mostly features a glacial or resedimented till known as the Wisconsinan Till and bedrock consisting of sandstone and shale. However, a large patch of Wisconsinan Ice-Contact Stratified Drift is situated near the creek's middle reaches. A few other small patches of it are located near the creek. Alluvium occurs along the creek in some places and there is a patch of sandstone and shale pits.

A feature identified by the Federal Emergency Management Agency as an obstruction occurs on Browns Creek in Jackson Township, near a private road.

== Watershed ==
The watershed of Browns Creek has an area of 3.86 square miles (10.0 km^{2}). The creek is entirely within the United States Geological Survey quadrangle of Kingston.

The watershed of Browns Creek is less developed than the areas in the vicinity of the main stem of Toby Creek. However, the Browns Creek watershed is beginning to urbanize. There are several wetlands along the creek. A pond known as Beckers Pond is also in the watershed.

== History ==
Browns Creek was entered into the Geographic Names Information System on August 2, 1979. Its identifier in the Geographic Names Information System is 1170385.

In 2000, as many as 5500 gallons of gasoline escaped from a ruptured pipeline in the vicinity of the watershed of Browns Creek. A total of three streams were affected by the gasoline leak: Browns Creek, a tributary of Browns Creek, and Huntsville Creek. Of these, Browns Creek was the second-most impacted stream. The most affected stream was the tributary of Browns Creek, where dead fish and aquatic wildlife were observed after the spill.

== See also ==
- List of rivers of Pennsylvania
