= WVW =

WVW, wvw, wVw. WvW or variant may refer to:

- Wyoming Valley West School District
- West Virginia Wesleyan College
- WvW (world versus world), a game mode in Guild Wars 2
- Westdeutsche Verlags- und Werbegesellschaft
