= Huntsville Creek =

River in Pennsylvania, US

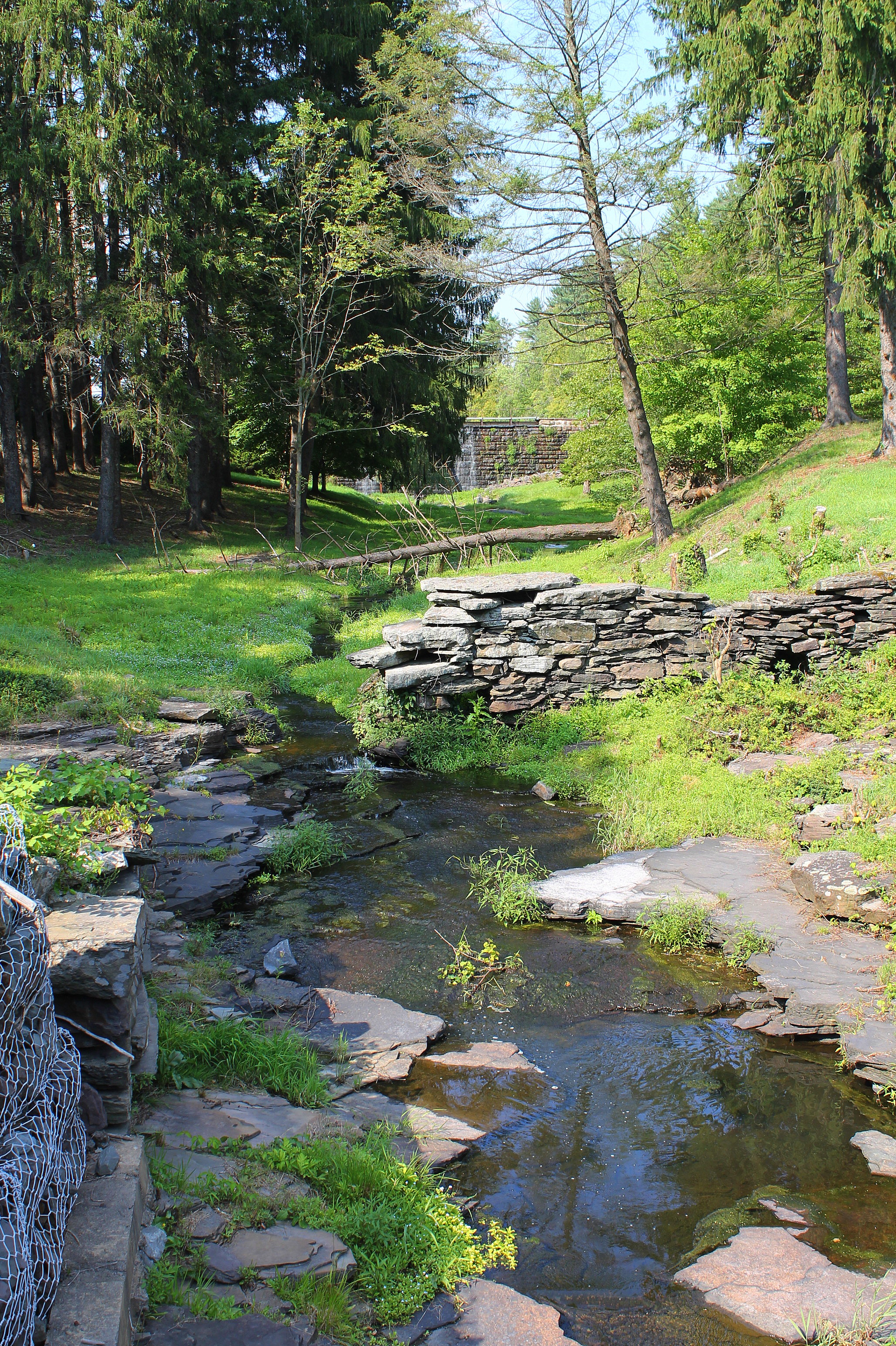
- Huntsville Creek looking upstream

Physical characteristics
- Source
  - location: base of a hill in Dallas Township, Luzerne County, Pennsylvania
  - elevation: between 1,280 and 1,300 feet (390 and 400 m)
- Mouth
  - location: Toby Creek in Kingston Township, Luzerne County, Pennsylvania
  - coordinates: 41°17′56″N 75°55′36″W
  - elevation: 804 ft (245 m)
- Length: 7.5 mi (12.1 km)
- Basin size: 14.7 mi^{2} (38 km^{2})

Basin features
- Progression: Toby Creek → Susquehanna River → Chesapeake Bay
- Tributaries
  - right: Browns Creek

Huntsville Creek is a tributary of Toby Creek in Luzerne County, Pennsylvania, in the United States. It is approximately 7.5 miles (12.1 km) long and flows through Dallas Township, Dallas, Lehman Township, Jackson Township, and Kingston Township. The watershed of the creek has an area of 14.7 square miles (38 km^{2}). It is designated as a Coldwater Fishery and a Migratory Fishery. Wisconsinan Till, Wisconsinan Ice-Contact Stratified Drift, alluvium, sandstone and shale pits, and bedrock consisting of sandstone and shale all occur in the watershed. A 2-billion gallon reservoir known as the Huntsville Reservoir is situated on the creek. The reservoir supplies water to 30,000 people. The creek has one named tributary, which is known as Browns Creek.

== Course ==
Huntsville Creek in a small pond at the base of a hill in Dallas Township. It flows south for a short distance before turning south-southwest and passing through a larger pond. The creek then turns south again for several tenths of a mile, entering Dallas, then reentering Dallas Township, then reentering Dallas. It then turns south-southwest for several tenths of a mile before turning south-southeast near the border between Dallas and Lehman Township. After a few tenths of a mile, it enters an arm of the Huntsville Reservoir and turns east. After a short distance, the arm gradually turns southwest and enters the main body of the reservoir. The creek then turns south and exits the reservoir after slightly more than a mile. It continues flowing south and enters Jackson Township. In this township, the creek flows south for a few tenths of a mile before turning east-southeast for a few miles. It then receives Browns Creek, its only named tributary, from the right. At this point, the creek turns east-northeast and flows alongside Larksville Mountain for several tenths of a mile. It then flows east-southeast for a few tenths of a mile until it reaches its confluence with Toby Creek.

Huntsville Creek joins Toby Creek 5.04 miles (8.11 km) upstream of its mouth.

=== Tributaries ===
Huntsville Creek has one named tributary, which is known as Browns Creek. Browns Creek joins Huntsville Creek 1.20 miles (1.93 km) upstream of its mouth. Its watershed has an area of 3.86 square miles (10.0 km^{2}).

== Hydrology ==
At the border between Jackson Township and Kingston Township, the peak annual discharge of Huntsville Creek has a 10 percent chance of reaching 1050 cubic feet per second. It has a 2 percent chance of reaching 1850 cubic feet per second and a 1 percent chance of reaching 2300 cubic feet per second. The peak annual discharge has a 0.2 percent chance of reaching 3850 cubic feet per second.

At the confluence of the tributary Browns Creek, the peak annual discharge of Huntsville Creek has a 10 percent chance of reaching 475 cubic feet per second. It has a 2 percent chance of reaching 850 cubic feet per second and a 1 percent chance of reaching 1100 cubic feet per second. The peak annual discharge has a 0.2 percent chance of reaching 1800 cubic feet per second.

In 1974, the water quality of Huntsville Creek was described as "depressed" from the Huntsville Filter Plant downstream to its mouth. However, it is not considered to be impaired.

== Geography and geology ==
The elevation near the mouth of Huntsville Creek is 804 feet (245 m) above sea level. The elevation of the creek's source is between 1,280 and 1,300 feet (390 and 400 m) above sea level.

Huntsville Creek is dammed by the Huntsville Dam. In the late 1970s, it was owned by the Pennsylvania Gas and Water Company. A 1978 inspection judged the dam to be in good condition.

Most of the surficial geology in the vicinity of Huntsville Creek features a glacial or resedimented till known as Wisconsinan Till and bedrock consisting of sandstone and shale. However, Wisconsinan Ice-Contact Stratified Drift occurs in some parts of the watershed, especially in its lower reaches. Alluvium is also found in some areas and there is one patch of sandstone and shale pits.

== Watershed ==
The watershed of Huntsville Creek has an area of 14.7 square miles (38 km^{2}). The creek is in the United States Geological Survey quadrangle of Kingston. Upstream of the tributary Browns Creek, the watershed of Huntsville Creek has an area of 10.21 square miles (26.4 km^{2}).

Huntsville Creek is the main source of flooding in Jackson Township. There are several patches of wetland and a number of lakes in the watershed.

The Pennsylvania American Water Company owns property along Huntsville Creek. A reservoir known as the Huntsville Reservoir is situated in the watershed of Huntsville Creek. It has a capacity of 1.9 billion gallons and supplies water to 30,000 people in Dallas, Kingston Township, Swoyersville, West Wyoming, and Wyoming.

The watershed of Huntsville Creek is considerably less developed than areas along the main stem of Toby Creek. However, the watershed is beginning to urbanize.

A planned natural gas well site is located in the vicinity of Huntsville Creek.

== History ==
Huntsville Creek was entered into the Geographic Names Information System on August 2, 1979. Its identifier in the Geographic Names Information System 1177637.

A concrete slab bridge was built over Huntsville Creek in 1927. It is 55.1 feet (16.8 m) long and carries CR 16/Hillside Road. A prestressed box beam bridge was constructed over the creek in 1975. It is 34.1 feet (10.4 m) long and carries T615/Gross Road. A bridge carrying Chase Road over the creek in Jackson Township was slated for replacement in 2013. The bridge was 90 or more years old.

The largest flood in Jackson Township occurred in 1972. At the eastern border of the township, the discharge of Huntsville Creek was 1650 cubic feet per second. Floodwaters were 1 foot (0.30 m) deep on Chase Road upstream of the tributary Browns Creek. Huntsville Creek also overflowed its banks on February 15, 2013. It was one of the few creeks in Luzerne County to do so during that flooding event.

In 2000, as many as 5500 gallons of gasoline escaped from a ruptured pipeline in the vicinity of the watershed of Huntsville Creek. Three streams were contaminated by the gasoline leak the tributary Browns Creek, a tributary of Browns Creek, and Huntsville Creek itself. Of these, Huntsville Creek was the least impacted stream.

== Biology ==
The entire drainage basin of Huntsville Creek is designated as a Coldwater Fishery and a Migratory Fishery.

Japanese Knotweed, an invasive species, has been observed on the banks of Huntsville Creek. This plant was at one point contributing to streambank erosion on the creek. However, in 2010 the Pennsylvania Environmental Council received a grant to remove the Japanese Knotweed and replace it with a riparian buffer consisting of native trees and shrubs.

== See also ==
- Trout Brook (Toby Creek), next tributary of Toby Creek going upstream
- List of rivers of Pennsylvania
