= Steve Poleskie =

American artist and educator (1938–2019)

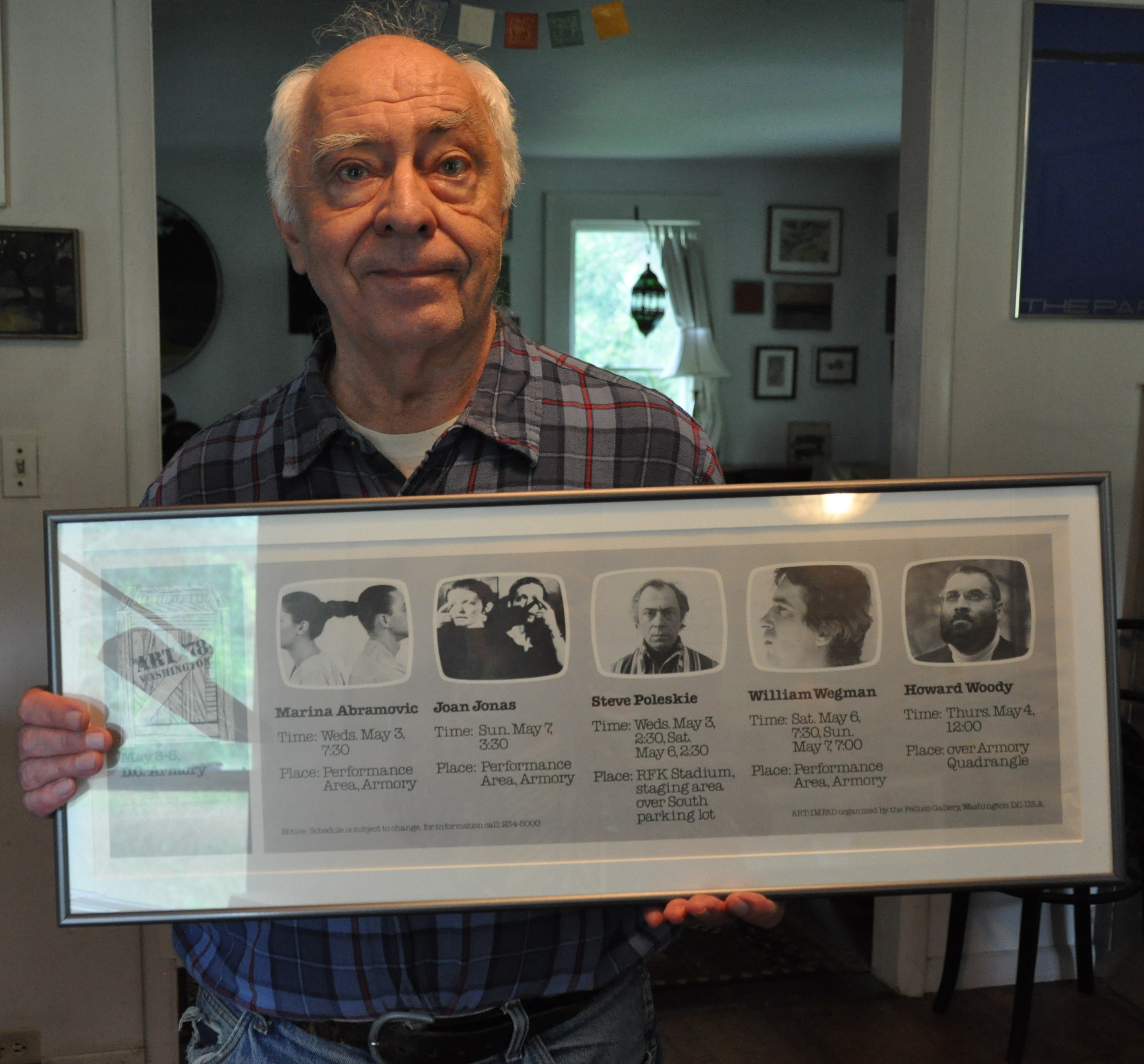
- Poleskie holding a poster for "Art Washington 1987", 2015
- Born: Stephen Francis Poleskie; June 3, 1938; Pringle, Pennsylvania, U.S.
- Died: December 21, 2019 (aged 81); Ithaca, New York, U.S.
- Occupations: Artist, printmaker, aerobatic pilot, performance artist, writer
- Known for: Chiron Press; Aerial Theater sky drawings; fine-art screen printing
- Movement: Performance art; postwar American printmaking
- Website: www.stephenpoleskie.com

Steve Poleskie (born Stephen Francis Poleskie; June 3, 1938 – December 21, 2019) was an American artist, printmaker, aerobatic pilot, performance artist, and writer. He founded Chiron Press, described as one of the first fine-art screen-printing studios in New York City, and produced prints for artists including Robert Rauschenberg, Roy Lichtenstein, Andy Warhol, James Rosenquist, Alex Katz, Robert Motherwell, and Helen Frankenthaler.

Poleskie later taught at Cornell University in Ithaca, New York, where he developed what he called "Aerial Theater": large-scale, time-based drawings made in the sky by flying an aerobatic biplane and releasing smoke in choreographed patterns. Contemporary critics, including the Italian curator and art historian Enrico Crispolti and the French critic Pierre Restany, described this work as a continuation of Italian Futurism and as a form of "planetary art", placing it in dialogue with late-20th-century performance, environmental, and land art practices.

His work as a printer, performer, and educator has been cited in histories of American Pop art, postwar printmaking, and experimental performance art. Poleskie also wrote fiction and nonfiction, including a biographical novel about American Civil War balloonist Thaddeus S. C. Lowe.

== Early life and education ==
Poleskie was born in Pringle, Pennsylvania, on June 3, 1938. He graduated from Wilkes University in 1959 with a degree in economics. A self-taught artist, he had his first solo exhibition at the Everhart Museum in Scranton, Pennsylvania, in 1958, while still in college.

== New York City and Chiron Press ==
In 1962 Poleskie took a studio on East 10th Street in New York City, a center of postwar avant-garde activity associated with the New York School and the downtown artist-run cooperative scene. In 1963 he opened a screen-printing studio that became Chiron Press, described as one of the first fine-art screen-printing shops in New York City.

During the five years he ran Chiron Press, he produced prints for artists including Robert Rauschenberg, Roy Lichtenstein, Andy Warhol, James Rosenquist, Alex Katz, Robert Motherwell, and Helen Frankenthaler. Chiron Press has been cited in studies of American Pop art and postwar printmaking as an important site where painters associated with Pop, post-Abstract Expressionism, and Color Field painting experimented with commercial screen-printing processes in a fine-art context.

One of the printers at Chiron Press was Brice Marden, then an emerging artist. During this period Poleskie was active in the downtown New York art community and associated with artists and critics including Elaine de Kooning, Willem de Kooning, Frank O'Hara, and Louise Nevelson. His own screen prints from the 1960s, often minimal or landscape-based compositions, were acquired by museums including the Metropolitan Museum of Art, the Museum of Modern Art, and the Whitney Museum of American Art in New York, as well as by the Smithsonian American Art Museum in Washington, D.C.

== Aerial Theater and performance art ==
In 1968 Poleskie sold Chiron Press and accepted a teaching position at Cornell University. While at Cornell he learned to fly, earned an aerobatic rating, and developed what he called "Aerial Theater": large-scale, time-based drawings made in the sky by flying an aerobatic biplane and releasing smoke in choreographed patterns.

Crispolti compared this work to a continuation of Italian Futurism, particularly its embrace of speed, technology, and skywriting as a visual language. Pierre Restany described it as "planetary art" on a scale comparable to monumental land works and other late-20th-century interventions into landscape, atmosphere, and public space. Poleskie performed Aerial Theater in the United States and Europe from the late 1960s through the 1980s and 1990s, sometimes collaborating with dancers, musicians, and parachutists.

Scholars have treated Aerial Theater as both an aeronautical practice and a form of performance art situated in contested or symbolically charged airspace. In 2024, Maria Anna Rogucka of the Jagiellonian University examined Poleskie's aerobatic sky works over Warsaw in 1979 as an example of how alternative or state-adjacent cultural spaces in late Cold War Eastern Europe could function as "oppositional or non-conformist expression", using public airspace as a temporary exhibition site.

In 1998 Poleskie retired from aerobatic performance and sold his aircraft. Works on paper from his Aerial Theater period entered public collections including the Victoria and Albert Museum and Tate in London; a Kunstverein in Kassel, Germany; the Museo di Castelvecchio in Verona, Italy; and Muzeum Sztuki in Łódź, Poland.

== Writing ==
After retiring from aerobatic performance, Poleskie devoted increasing time to fiction and nonfiction writing. His publications include The Balloonist: The Story of T. S. C. Lowe—Inventor, Scientist, Magician, and Father of the U.S. Air Force (2007), a biographical novel based on the life of Civil War aeronaut and military balloonist Thaddeus S. C. Lowe. He later published additional novels, including The Third Candidate (2008) and Grater Life (2009).

== Later work ==
In 2000 Poleskie destroyed a significant portion of his early artworks and withdrew most of his remaining early work from circulation. He began working in digital photography in 2004 and exhibited this work in Ithaca in 2006.

== Personal life ==
Poleskie was married to author Jeanne Mackin; the couple lived in Ithaca, New York.

== Death ==
Poleskie died on December 21, 2019, at the age of 81.

== Legacy ==
Chiron Press and Poleskie's printmaking activity have been cited in histories of American Pop art and postwar printmaking, including work by Mary Lee Corlett and by Swann Galleries specialist Meagan Gandolfo. Scholars have noted that Chiron Press served as a link between commercial silkscreen processes and high-art print editions at a moment when Pop artists and their contemporaries were expanding the role of collaborative print workshops in the United States.

The Fall 2020 Contemporary Art Sale at Swann Galleries featured more than thirty works from Poleskie's personal collection, including a pencil portrait of Poleskie by Elaine de Kooning, an oil-on-wood landscape by Alex Katz, and a preparatory sketch for Robert Indiana's LOVE poster. An accompanying essay, "Chiron Press—The First of Its Kind", was released by Gandolfo.

Poleskie's Chiron-era archives, including Chiron Press records, were placed in the Archives of American Art of the Smithsonian Institution. His post-Chiron archives were deposited in the Division of Rare and Manuscript Collections of the Cornell University Library. His work has been acquired posthumously by Wilkes University, the National Gallery of Denmark, and the Kosciuszko Foundation, among other public institutions worldwide.

In 2023, an untitled work by Poleskie was included in the exhibition Land Use[d] at a Marywood University art gallery, alongside works by Andy Warhol, Robert Smithson, and Bernd and Hilla Becher.

In 2024, and continuing into 2025, several of Poleskie's Chiron-era silkscreens and collaborations were shown at New York's Terrain Gallery in the exhibition Surface to Begin With—Silkscreens of the 1960s. A review in Whitehot Magazine stated that there was "an exhilaration to the choice of works as each seems to beckon one's attention over another".

A solo exhibition, Tracing the Sky: Steve Poleskie's Aerial Theater on Paper, opened at the Maslow Study Gallery for Contemporary Art at Marywood University in October 2025. The exhibition, curated by Ryan Ward (curator of the Maslow Collection) and Evan D. Williams, presented prints, collages, and drawings related to the artist's sky performances and was accompanied by an illustrated catalog produced in collaboration with Marywood's Aviation and Graphic Design students.

In 2025, the publisher OM Books announced a planned monograph on Poleskie's Aerial Theater work above and around New York City.

== Bibliography ==
- Poleskie, Stephen (2007). The Balloonist: The Story of T. S. C. Lowe—Inventor, Scientist, Magician, and Father of the U.S. Air Force. Frederic C. Beil, Savannah, Georgia. ISBN 978-1-929490-27-1.
- Poleskie, Stephen (2008). The Third Candidate. Wasteland Press, Shelbyville, Kentucky. ISBN 978-1-60047-209-1.
- Poleskie, Stephen (2009). Grater Life. Wasteland Press, Shelbyville, Kentucky. ISBN 978-1-60047-291-6.
