= Trout Brook (Toby Creek tributary) =

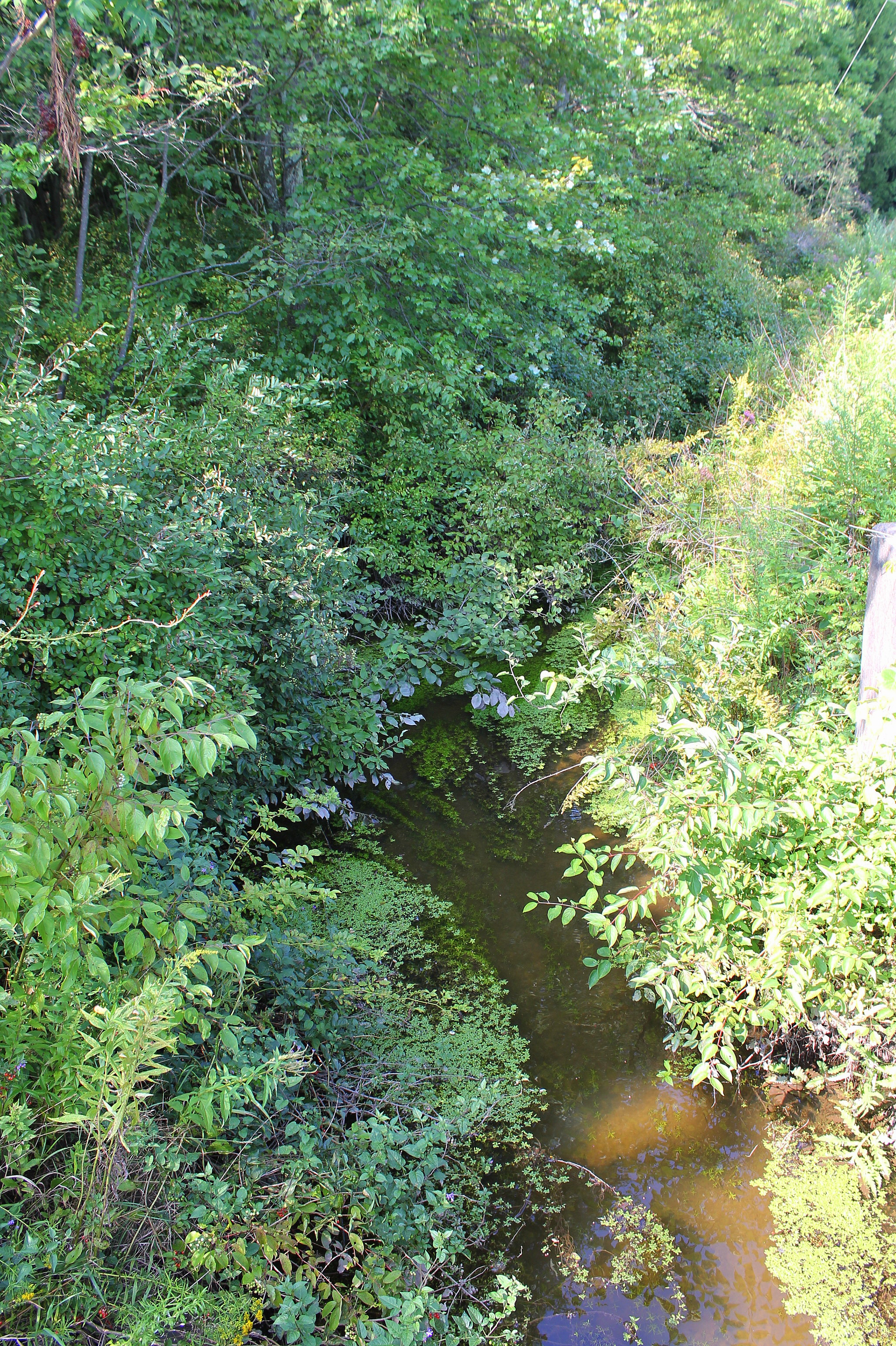
- Trout Brook

Physical characteristics
- Source
  - location: pond near Lower Demunds Road in Dallas Township, Luzerne County, Pennsylvania
  - elevation: 1,200 ft (370 m)
- Mouth
  - location: Toby Creek in Dallas Township, Luzerne County, Pennsylvania
  - coordinates: 41°19′50″N 75°56′36″W
  - elevation: 1,020 ft (310 m)
- Length: 3.4 mi (5.5 km)
- Basin size: 4.20 sq mi (10.9 km^{2})

Basin features
- Progression: Toby Creek → Susquehanna River → Chesapeake Bay

Trout Brook is a tributary of Toby Creek in Luzerne County, Pennsylvania, in the United States. It is approximately 3.4 miles (5.5 km) long and flows through Dallas Township. Its watershed has an area of 4.20 square miles (10.9 km^{2}). It is designated as a Coldwater Fishery and a Migratory Fishery. The stream is affected by sediment deposits and debris such as fallen trees. Wisconsinan Till, alluvium, wetlands, and bedrock consisting of shale and sandstone occur in the stream's vicinity.

== Course ==
Trout Brook begins in a pond near Lower Demunds Road in Dallas Township. It flows south-southeast alongside the road for nearly a mile before turning south. Over the next mile or so, it continues flowing alongside Lower Deumunds Road, crossing it several times. The stream then turns south-southwest and enters a valley as it continues to flow alongside the road. After several tenths of a mile, it turns south and passes through Maplewood Heights before turning south-southwest. Several tenths of a mile further downstream, it reaches its confluence with Toby Creek just north of Shavertown.

Trout Brook joins Toby Creek 7.60 miles (12.23 km) upstream of its mouth.

== Geography and geology ==
The elevation near the mouth of Trout Brook is 1,020 feet (310 m) above sea level. The elevation of the stream's source is just over 1,200 feet (370 m) above sea level.

Logs and other types of debris commonly wash into Trout Brook. The stream has also been affected by sediment accumulating in it. This has lowered the depth of the streambed to a few feet in locations where it was considerably deeper at times during the 20th century. Chief Gathering, LLC has an erosion and sediment control permit involving the stream.

The surficial geology in the vast majority of areas near Trout Brook features a glacial or resedimented till known as Wisconsinan Till and bedrock consisting of sandstone and shale. However, there is also an area of alluvium near its mouth.

== Watershed ==
The watershed of Trout Brook has an area of 4.20 square miles (10.9 km^{2}). The creek is entirely within the United States Geological Survey quadrangle of Kingston.

The watershed of Trout Brook is relatively undeveloped compared to the land near the main stem of Toby Creek. However, the watershed is beginning to urbanize. This could potentially lead to an increase in high stream flows.

Runoff from a development in the vicinity of Trout Brook occasionally overflows its detention pond and flows into the stream. As of 2005, another proposed development may also send water into the stream. Due to its shallow streambed, this poses a flooding risk. A patch of wetland is located along the lower reaches of the stream.

== History ==
Trout Brook was entered into the Geographic Names Information System on October 1, 1992. Its identifier in the Geographic Names Information System is 1214669.

Trout Brook was affected by Tropical Storm Lee and Tropical Storm Irene. These tropical storms caused the stream to be clogged with large amounts of debris. State and federal funds were used to clear away the debris.

== Biology ==
Trout Brook is designated as a Coldwater Fishery and a Migratory Fishery.

== See also ==
- Huntsville Creek, next tributary of Toby Creek going downstream
- List of rivers of Pennsylvania
