= Kunkle, Pennsylvania =

Unincorporated community in Pennsylvania, US

- Unincorporated community
- Location within Pennsylvania Location within the United States
- Coordinates: 41°22′42″N 75°58′57″W
- Country: United States
- State: Pennsylvania
- County: Luzerne
- Township: Dallas
- Elevation: 1,076 ft (328 m)
- Time zone: UTC-5 (Eastern (EST))
  - Summer (DST): UTC-4 (EDT)
- Area code: 570
- GNIS feature ID: 1198984

Kunkle is an unincorporated community in Dallas Township, Luzerne County, Pennsylvania, United States.
