= Luzerne, Pennsylvania =

Borough in Pennsylvania, US

- Borough
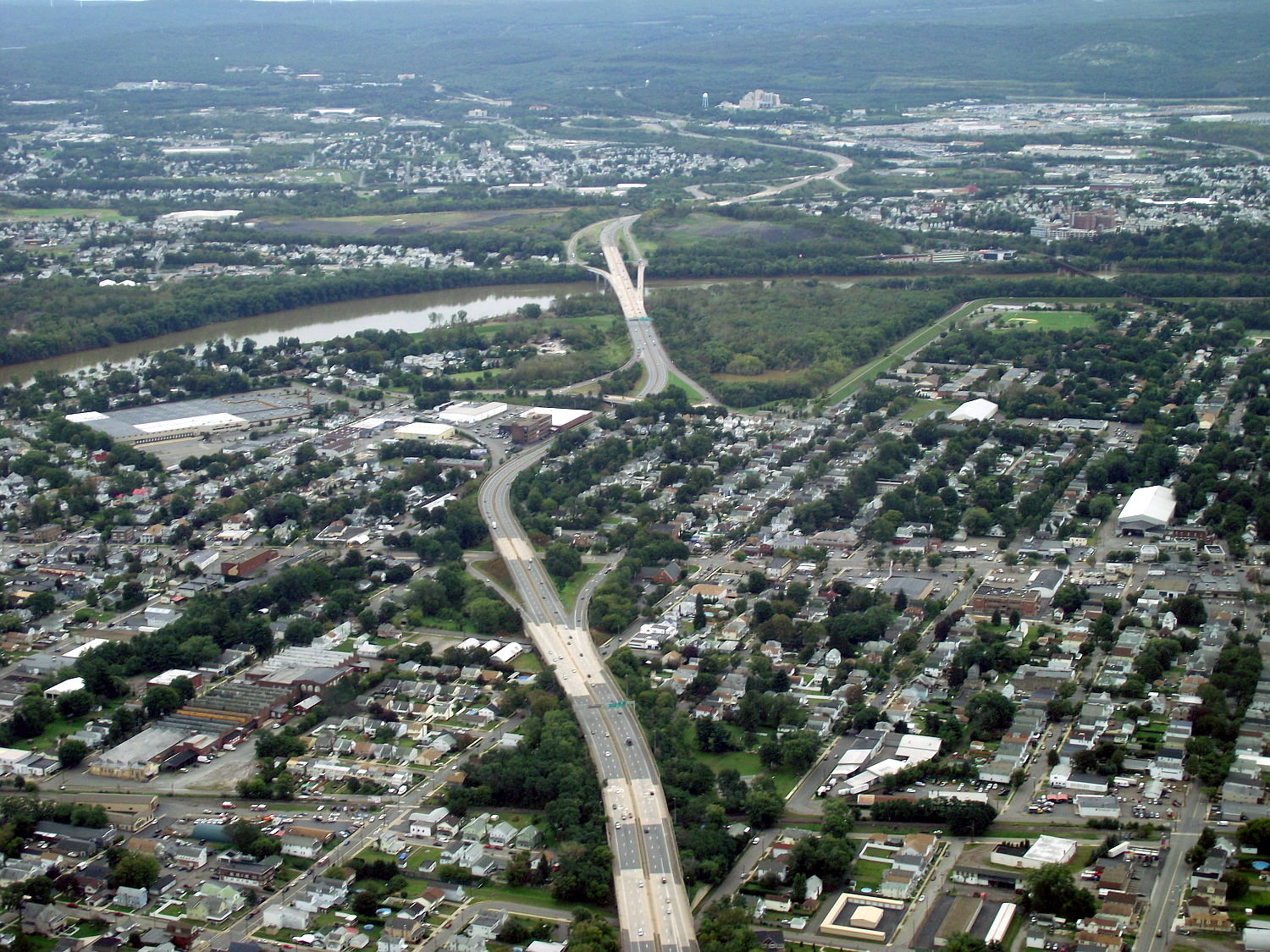
- A picture of PA 309 as it travels through Luzerne and the surrounding communities. Luzerne is pictured in the foreground.

- Location of Luzerne in Luzerne County, Pennsylvania

- Location within Pennsylvania Location within the United States
- Coordinates: 41°17′02″N 75°53′34″W
- Country: United States
- State: Pennsylvania
- County: Luzerne
- Settled: 1807
- Incorporated: 1882

Government
  - Type: Borough Council

Area
  - Total: 0.71 sq mi (1.83 km^{2})
  - Land: 0.71 sq mi (1.83 km^{2})
  - Water: 0 sq mi (0.00 km^{2})

Population (2020)
  - Total: 2,711
  - Density: 3,834.8/sq mi (1,480.62/km^{2})
- Time zone: UTC-5 (Eastern (EST))
  - Summer (DST): UTC-4 (EDT)
- Zip code: 18709
- Area code: 570
- FIPS code: 42-45568
- Website: luzerneborough.org

Luzerne is a borough located 5 miles (8 km) north of Wilkes Barre in Luzerne County, Pennsylvania, United States.

The population was 2,703 at the time of the 2020 census.

== History ==
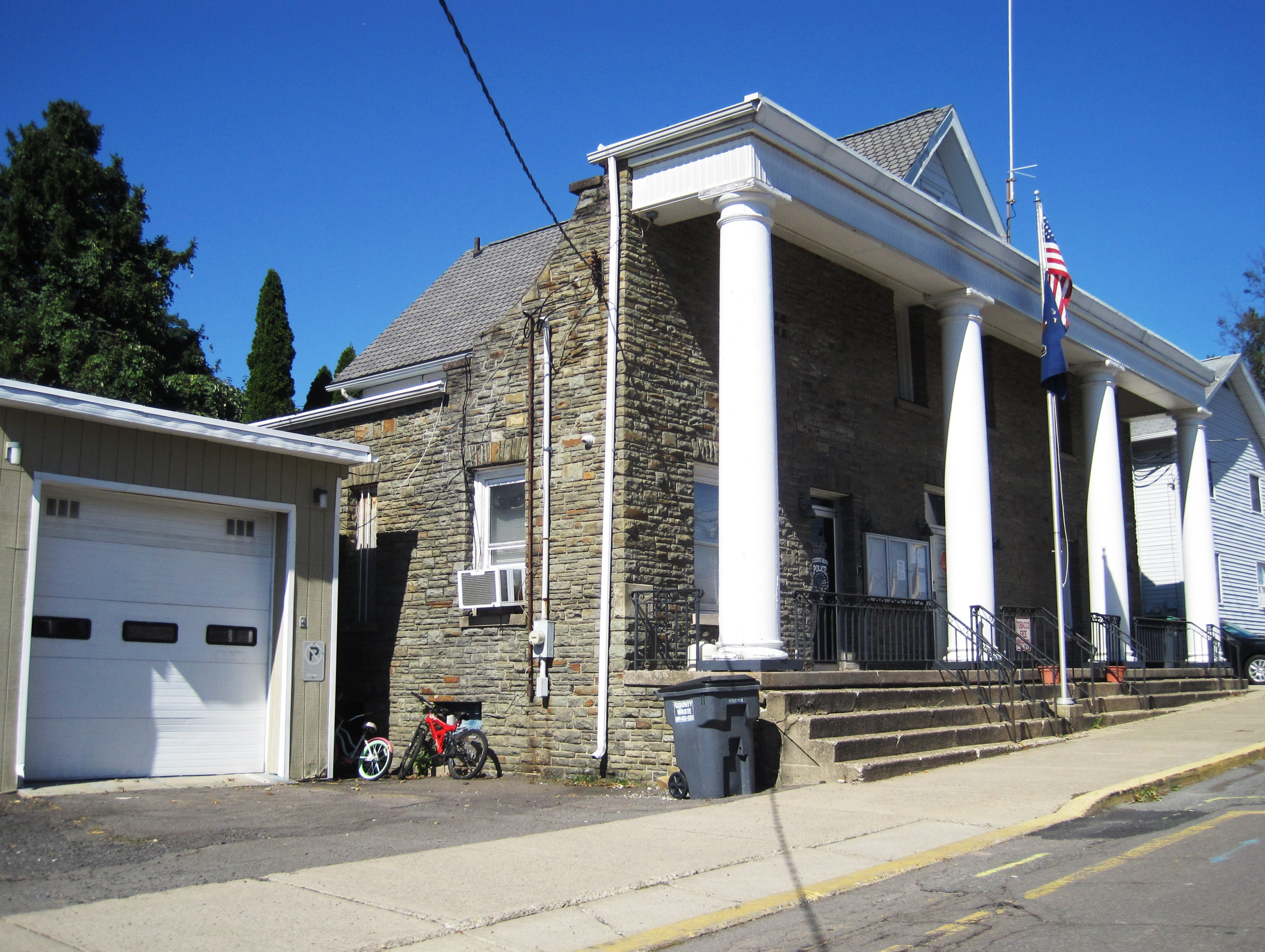
Luzerne Borough Municipal Building

The community was first settled in 1807. Luzerne Borough was originally known as "Hartseph Hollow" (or Hartseph) in the late 18th century, named after early settler Zachariah Hartseph. The area developed rapidly around Toby Creek, where safely utilizing water power allowed early pioneers to establish essential gristmills and sawmills. Formally incorporated as a borough in 1882, the municipality changed its name to Luzerne to align with the county, which had been named in honor of the Chevalier de la Luzerne, a French minister to the United States during the Revolutionary War.

The borough’s trajectory shifted dramatically in the 19th and early 20th centuries with the boom of the anthracite coal mining industry. Luzerne became a bustling commercial hub for miners and their families, hosting thriving downtown businesses along Main Street, rail lines, and nearby collieries like the Harry E. Enterprise. The local economy was heavily anchored by coal production until the industry’s decline in the mid-20th century, accelerated by regional disasters like the Knox Mine Disaster of 1959.

In the modern era, Luzerne successfully transitioned from an industrial coal town into a residential community. The borough famously weathered severe regional flooding from Hurricane Agnes in 1972, rebuilding its infrastructure and preserving its historic architecture. Today, Luzerne is known for its walkable downtown shopping district and antique stores.

== Geography ==
Luzerne is located at 41°17′2″N 75°53′34″W (41.283780, -75.892890).

According to the United States Census Bureau, the borough has a total area of 0.69 square miles (1.8 km^{2}), all of it land.

== Demographics ==
Historical population
Census	Pop.	Note	%±
1890	2,398		—
1900	3,817		59.2%
1910	5,426		42.2%
1920	5,998		10.5%
1930	6,950		15.9%
1940	7,082		1.9%
1950	6,176		−12.8%
1960	5,118		−17.1%
1970	4,504		−12.0%
1980	3,703		−17.8%
1990	3,206		−13.4%
2000	2,952		−7.9%
2010	2,845		−3.6%
2020	2,711		−4.7%
2021 (est.)	2,710	▼	0.0%

As of the census of 2000, there were 2,952 people, 1,410 households, and 767 families living in the borough.

The population density was 4,299.3 inhabitants per square mile (1,660.0/km^{2}). There were 1,520 housing units at an average density of 2,213.7 per square mile (854.7/km^{2}).

The racial makeup of the borough was 98.92% White, 0.34% African American, 0.07% Asian, 0.20% from other races, and 0.47% from two or more races. Hispanic or Latino of any race were 0.44% of the population.

There were 1,410 households, out of which 20.2% had children under the age of eighteen living with them; 38.7% were married couples living together, 11.0% had a female householder with no husband present, and 45.6% were non-families. 40.9% of all households were made up of individuals, and 21.0% had someone living alone who was sixty-five years of age or older.

The average household size was 2.09 and the average family size was 2.87.

In the borough the population was spread out, with 17.6% under the age of eighteen, 7.3% from eighteen to twenty-four, 28.7% from twenty-five to forty-four, 22.5% from forty-five to sixty-four, and 23.9% who were sixty-five years of age or older. The median age was forty-three years.

For every one hundred females there were 88.7 males. For every one hundred females aged eighteen and over, there were 86.6 males.

The median income for a household in the borough was $27,614, and the median income for a family was $37,730. Males had a median income of $27,054 compared with that of $21,250 for females.

The per capita income for the borough was $16,217.

Roughly 6.8% of families and 11.4% of the population were living below the poverty line, including 14.5% of those who were under the age of eighteen and 10.9% of those who were aged sixty-five or over.

== Education ==
It is in the Wyoming Valley West School District.

== See also ==
- List of towns and boroughs in Pennsylvania
