= West Side Career and Technology Center =

Coordinates: 41.2784°N 75.902°W

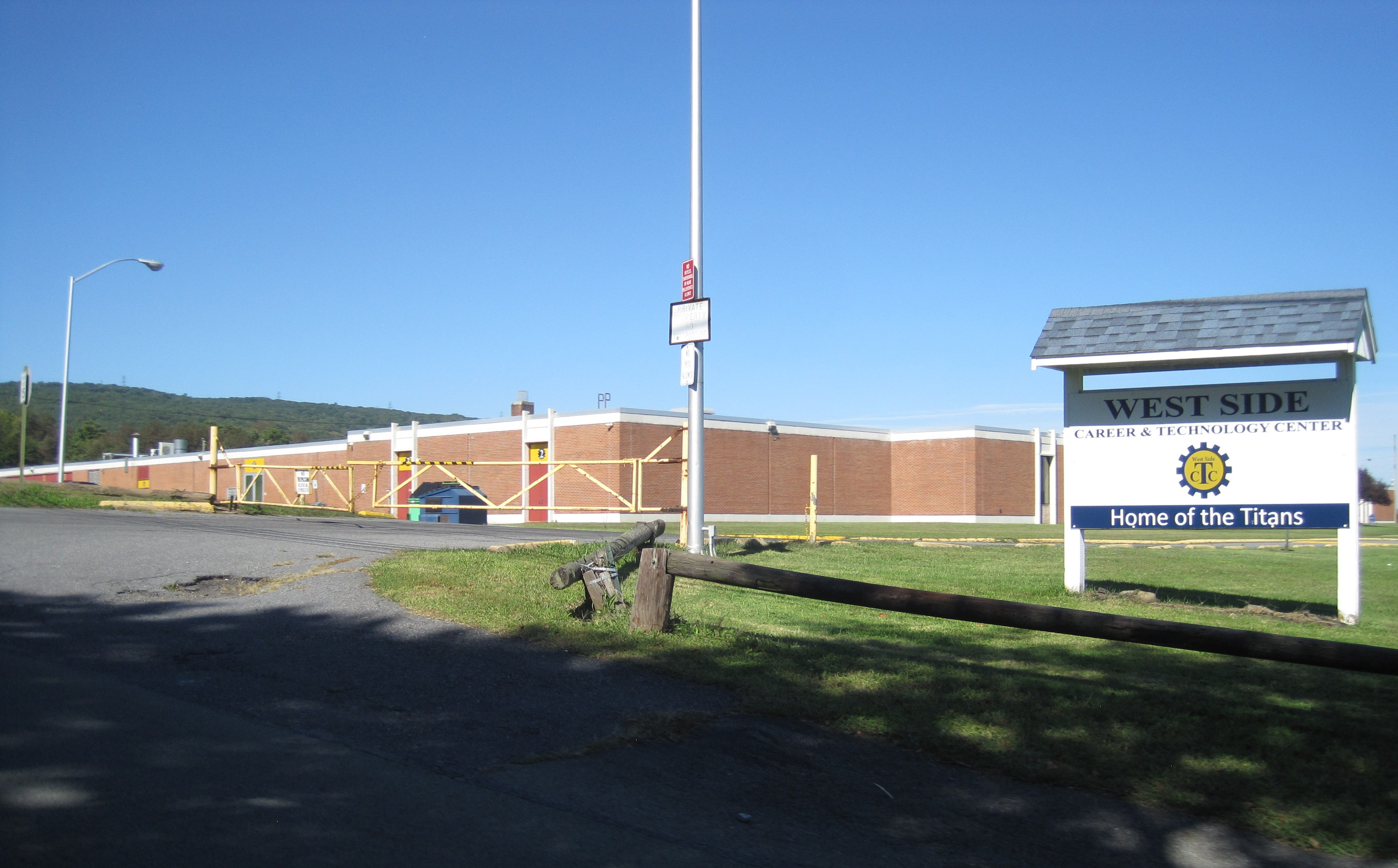

Location
- 75 Evans St. Pringle; Pennsylvania; United States

Information
- Former name: West Side Area Vocational Technical School
- Type: Career and Technology Center
- School district: Wyoming Valley West
- Principal: Richard "Rick" Rava
- Grades: 9-12
- Enrollment: 566
- Colors: Blue and gold
- Athletics conference: Wyoming Valley Conference
- Mascot: Titans
- Website: www.wsctc.net

West Side Career and Technology Center (formerly West Side Area Vocational-Technical School) is a full-time Career and Technology Center located in Luzerne County at 75 Evans Street, Pringle, Pennsylvania. The school is home to students of Wyoming Valley West, Dallas, Northwest, Wyoming Area, and Lake-Lehman school districts in the 2008-2009 school year. The current principal is Rick Rava. The administrative director is Thomas Duffy from Dallas School District, who replaced the retired Thomas Viviano. Viviano replaced Nancy Tkatch, who resigned during the 2013–2014 school year amid an investigation into fraudulent uses of the school credit cards.

== School ==
In order to graduate, students must take at least three years of a shop class in addition to their core classes. Students can select from a wide variety of shops such as cosmetology, automotive technology, criminal enforcement, and computer technology.

Students must also complete a WSCTC Experience Project, with career and technical related job topics presented like a portfolio.

== WSCTC Programs ==
West Side Career & Technology Center offers a wide selection of fully accredited academic courses. These courses will meet all requirements for high school graduation. In addition, the school also has advanced academic courses to meet the requirement for those students who are moving on to post secondary education.

West Side CTC also has fifteen Career & Technology programs to choose from. These programs represent business and technology; skilled trades and courses that offer an advanced start to post secondary training.

The Co-operative education program offers students an opportunity to gain real world work experience while still in high school. Many local employers hire the students because of the highly skilled and highly trained employees. In some situations, the high school co-op jobs lead to well paying, full-time jobs, upon high school graduation.

=== Computer Technologies ===
- Maintenance & Network Security
- C.I.T. (Computer Information Technology)

=== Automotive Technologies ===
- Auto-Mechanics
- Auto-Body/Collision Repair

=== Other Technologies ===
- Marketing (Distributive Education)
- Auto Body
- Auto Mechanic
- Machine Technology
- Carpentry
- HVAC
- Early Childhood Education
- Electrical Technology
- Criminal/Law Enforcement
- Health Related Technology
- Cosmetology
- Audio/Visual Communications
- Culinary Arts

== Sports ==
The sports programs at West Side CTC were cut due to a budget shortfall.

== Controversy ==
In the past, The Wyoming Valley West School district adopted a dress code, and soon after WSCTC also adopted a similar dress code. Not long after, the two representatives from Wyoming Valley West wanted more control over the WSCTC school board, as most of the students and funding comes from the WVW school district. It was said that if they did not get the control they wanted, they would pull out of WSCTC's partnership and discontinue sending their students, as well as discontinuing funding. This caused an uproar from the students and parents, because they were concerned their children would not receive the education they are entitled to by U.S. Law. A protest of students, parents, and alumni was held at a school board meeting, and soon after things did not work out in WVW's favor.

Wyoming Valley West has since decided to rejoin the JOC due to the extreme overpayment to the tech center.

== Website ==
- Official website
