= Jeanne Mackin =

American author

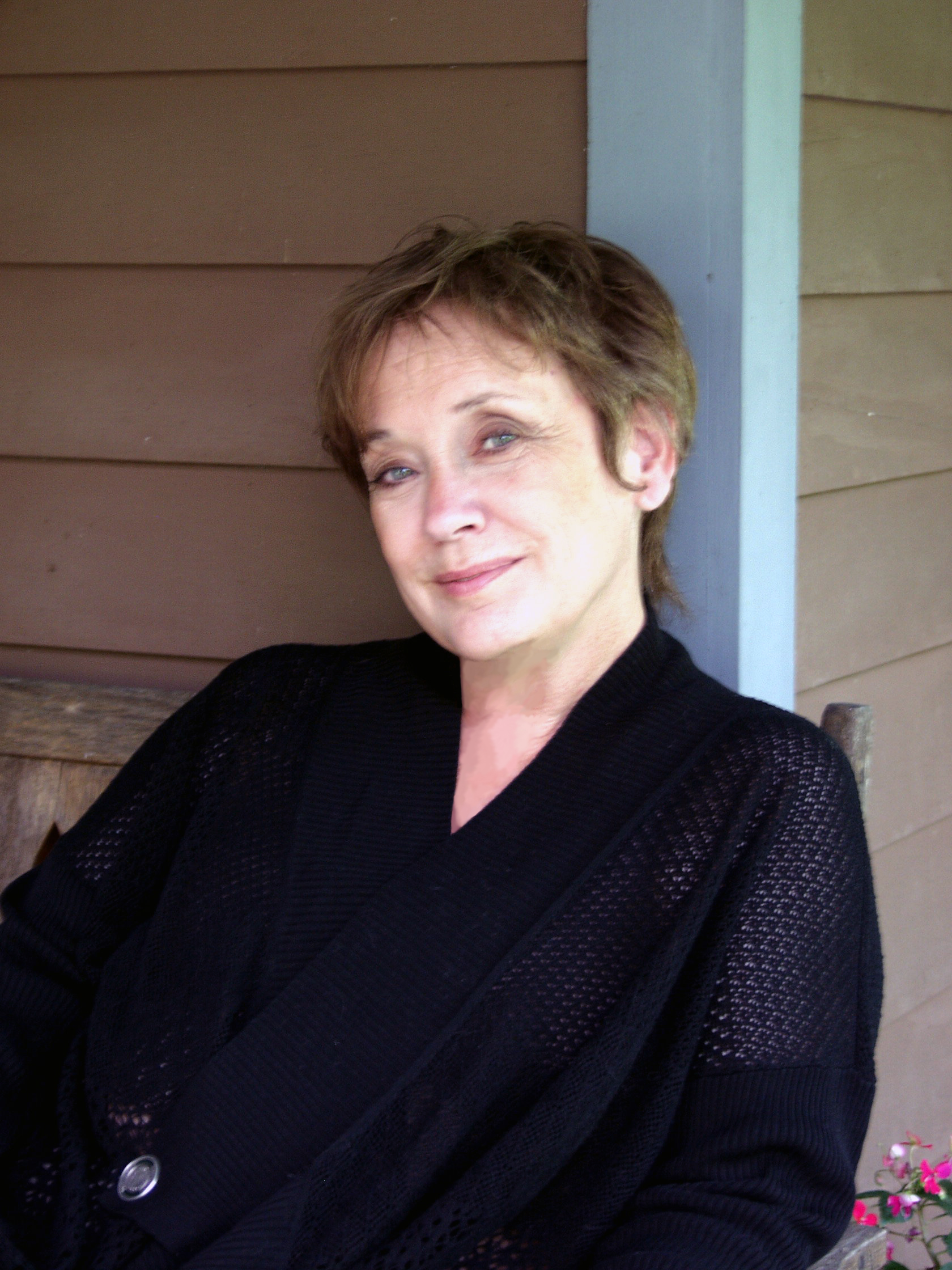
- Mackin at her home in Ithaca, New York
- Occupations: Novelist; journalist; writing instructor
- Writing career
- Genres: Literary fiction, non-fiction
- Website: www.jeannemackin.com

Jeanne Mackin is an American author and a fellow of the American Antiquarian Society. Her published novels include A Lady of Good Family, The Beautiful American, The Sweet By and By, Dreams of Empire, The Queen's War and The Frenchwoman. She published a trilogy of mysteries with New American Library, writing as Anna Maclean. The mysteries were also translated and published in Japan. She has authored several non-fiction books and written creative nonfiction and feature articles for The New York Times, Americana, Fiberarts and other national publications. Working with Finger Lakes Productions, she helped develop, write and edit scripts for nationally broadcast radio programs including Nature Watch and the Ocean Report with Sylvia Earle.

== Biography ==
Mackin received her BA in English from Ithaca College, and her MFA in creative writing from Bennington College. Earlier in her career, she worked as a program developer and script editor for Ocean Report, a popular science program on the planet's oceans produced for national and international radio. She was also a staff writer for Cornell University Media Services and a writer for The Ithaca Journal and Ithaca Times.

Mackin's extensive experience as a writing instructor began in 1990 at Ithaca College, where she served as an instructor and academic consultant for the Ithaca Opportunity Program and Higher Education Opportunity Program of New York State, working with minority students and students from non-traditional backgrounds. From 1997 until 2004, Mackin taught writing at Ithaca College, and in the Masters of Fine Arts Program at Goddard College. She was married artist and writer Steve Poleskie until his death in 2019. She lives in upstate New York.

== Awards and honors ==
- Creative Writing Fellowship from American Antiquarian Society
- Excellence in Teaching Award from Ithaca College
- Wesleyan University Scholarship in Creative Writing Summer Program
- Excellence in News Writing, The State Council of New York for University Affairs and Development
- Exceptional Achievement in News Writing, Council for Advancement and Support of Education, Washington, D.C.
- Excellence in News Writing Citation Award, Council for Advancement and Support of Education, Washington, D.C.

== Bibliography ==
=== Novels ===
- Picasso's Lovers (2024)
- The Last Collection: A Novel of Elsa Schiaparelli and Coco Chanel (2019)
- A Lady of Good Family, New American Library (2015)
- The Beautiful American, New American Library (2014)
- Louisa and the Crystal Gazer, writing as Anna Maclean (2006)
- Louisa and the Country Bachelor, writing as Anna Maclean (2005)
- Louisa and the Missing Heiress, writing as Anna Maclean (2004)
- The Sweet By and By (2001)
- Dreams of Empire (1996)
- The Queen's War (1991)
- The Frenchwoman (1989)

=== Nonfiction ===
- The Book of Love, co-editor with Diane Ackerman
- The Cornell Book of Herbs and Edible Flowers

Her works have been published in 6 languages.

== Reviews ==
Mackin's historical romance, Dreams of Empire (1996) was favourably received, with Publishers Weekly saying "Plenty of romance and intrigue, vital characters and exquisite details of both period and place ensure a vigorous and satisfying read." Kirkus described it as "A richly intelligent and charming spellbinder."

Her novel The Sweet By and By (2001) was described by Kirkus as "a deft combination of historical fiction and ghost story, as well as a compelling meditation on the power of the past to alter the present". The Baltimore Sun criticised it for veering off and "producing far more than one too many modern-day coincidences, going a little heavy on all that pining for the lost beloved", while concluding the story was "great fun for a stormy evening".

Mackin's novels have been written about by Pulitzer Prize winner Alison Lurie in The New York Review of Books, in which she described the mysteries written under the pen name of Anna Maclean as "historically accurate and entertaining".
