= Wyoming Valley West School District =

School district in Pennsylvania

Coordinates: 41.26819°N 75.89200°W

Wyoming Valley West School District (WVWSD)
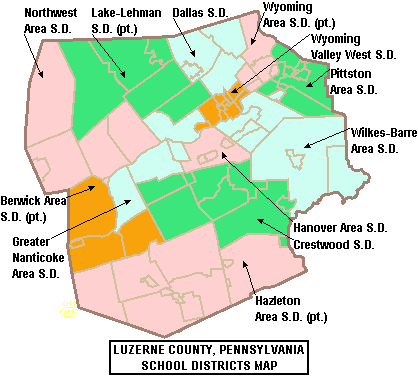
- Location of Wyoming Valley West School District in Luzerne County, Pennsylvania

Address
- 450 North Maple Ave. Kingston, Pennsylvania, 18704; United States

District information
- Type: Public
- Motto: Towards Excellence
- Grades: K-12

Students and staff
- District mascot: A Spartan
- Colors: Burgundy and Gold

Other information
- Website: http://www.wvwsd.org/

Wyoming Valley West School District is a large, suburban public school district in Luzerne County, Pennsylvania. Students from nine boroughs attend Wyoming Valley West: Courtdale, Edwardsville, Forty Fort, Larksville, Luzerne, Plymouth, Pringle, Kingston, and Swoyersville. Wyoming Valley West School District encompasses approximately 14 square miles. According to 2000 federal census data, it serves a resident population of 44,510. In 2009, the residents' per capita income was $17,532 while the median family income was $40,398. The median income of a home owner was $38,252 per year.

The district operates six schools, including Wyoming Valley West High School, the Wyoming Valley West Middle School and four elementary schools: Chester Street Elementary School, Dana Street Elementary Center, State Street Elementary Center, and Third Avenue Elementary School. The District Administration (2009–2010)

Students within the school district may elect to attend the West Side Career and Technology Center (formerly West Side Area Vocational Technical School). The Career Center, located in Pringle, offers 18 unique technical programs that not only prepare students for future employment but also prepare those among them who would like to go on to college.
