= Browns Creek (South Carolina) =

Stream in Union County, South Carolina, U.S.

Coordinates: 34°43′22″N 81°28′43″W

Browns Creek is a stream in Union County, South Carolina, in the United States.

Browns Creek was named for Gabriel Brown, a pioneer who settled near its mouth.

== See also ==
- List of rivers of South Carolina
