= Browns Creek (Henderson County, Tennessee) =

Stream in Tennessee, U.S.

Coordinates: 35.621459°N 88.255318°W

Browns Creek is a stream in the U.S. state of Tennessee. It is a principal tributary to the Beech River.

Browns Creek has the name of a pioneer settler.
