= Courtdale, Pennsylvania =

Borough in Pennsylvania, US

- Borough
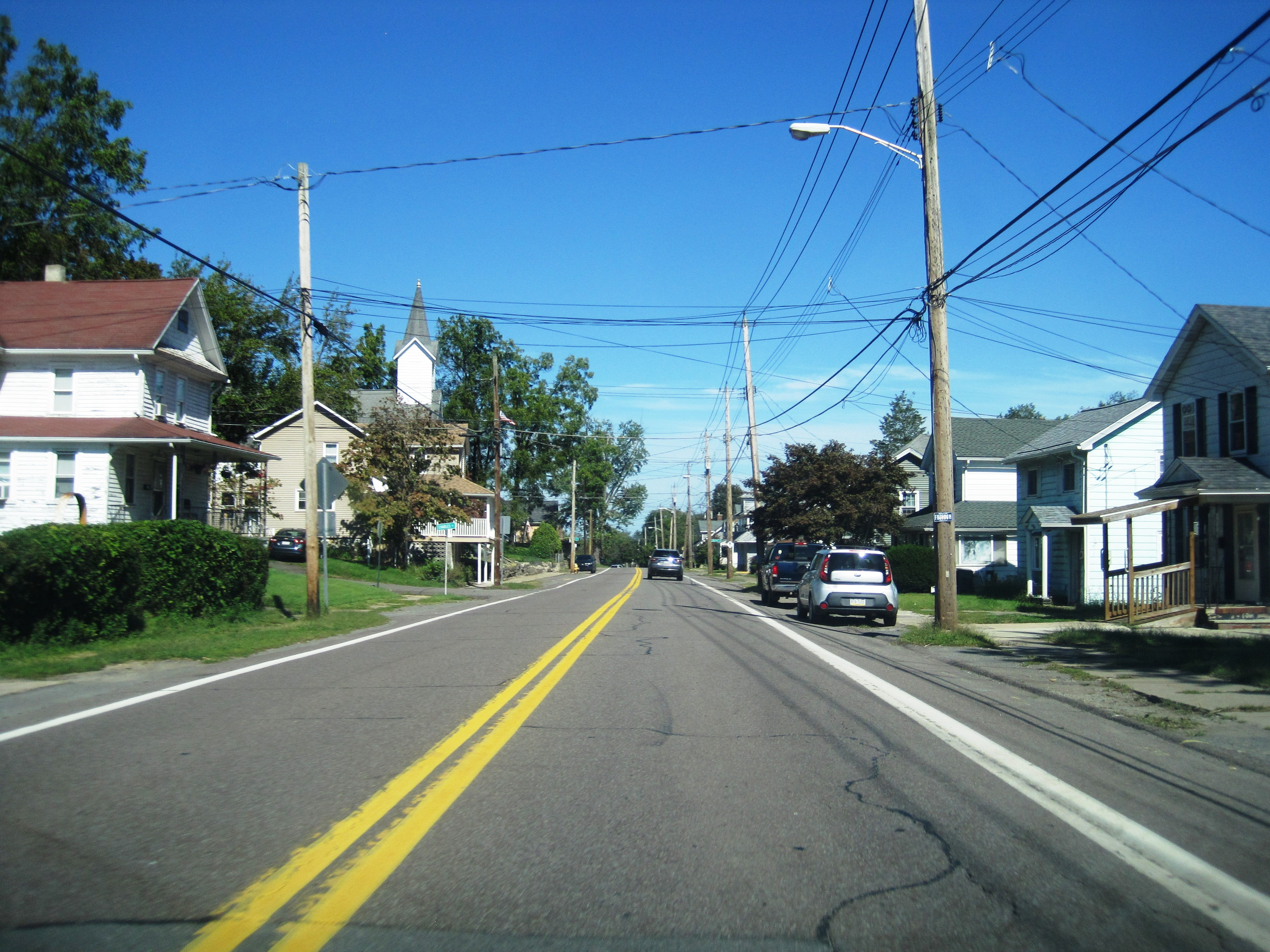
- Courtdale Avenue eastbound in Courtdale

- Location of Courtdale in Luzerne County, Pennsylvania.

- Location within Pennsylvania Location within the United States
- Coordinates: 41°17′05″N 75°54′17″W
- Country: United States
- State: Pennsylvania
- County: Luzerne
- Incorporated: 1897

Government
  - Type: Borough Council
  - Mayor: Jacki Reilly Degnan

Area
  - Total: 1.02 sq mi (2.65 km^{2})
  - Land: 1.02 sq mi (2.65 km^{2})
  - Water: 0 sq mi (0.00 km^{2})
- Elevation: 640 ft (200 m)

Population (2020)
  - Total: 689
  - Density: 674.0/sq mi (260.24/km^{2})
- Time zone: UTC-5 (Eastern (EST))
  - Summer (DST): UTC-4 (EDT)
- Zip code: 18704
- Area code: 570
- FIPS code: 42-16568
- Website: https://courtdaleborough.org/

Courtdale is a borough in Luzerne County, Pennsylvania, United States. The population was 689 at the 2020 census.

== History ==
Courtdale was incorporated as a borough in 1897. During the 19th and 20th centuries, coal mining and manufacturing were the major industries in the area.

== Geography ==
According to the United States Census Bureau, the borough has a total area of 1.0 square mile (2.6 km^{2}), all land. It is part of the Wyoming Valley West School District.

Most of the homes and businesses are concentrated in the southern half of the municipality, while the northern portion is mostly made up of thick forests.

== Demographics ==
Historical population
Census	Pop.	Note	%±
1900	420		—
1910	548		30.5%
1920	600		9.5%
1930	1,007		67.8%
1940	1,039		3.2%
1950	982		−5.5%
1960	845		−14.0%
1970	1,027		21.5%
1980	844		−17.8%
1990	784		−7.1%
2000	791		0.9%
2010	732		−7.5%
2020	689		−5.9%
2021 (est.)	690	▲	0.1%

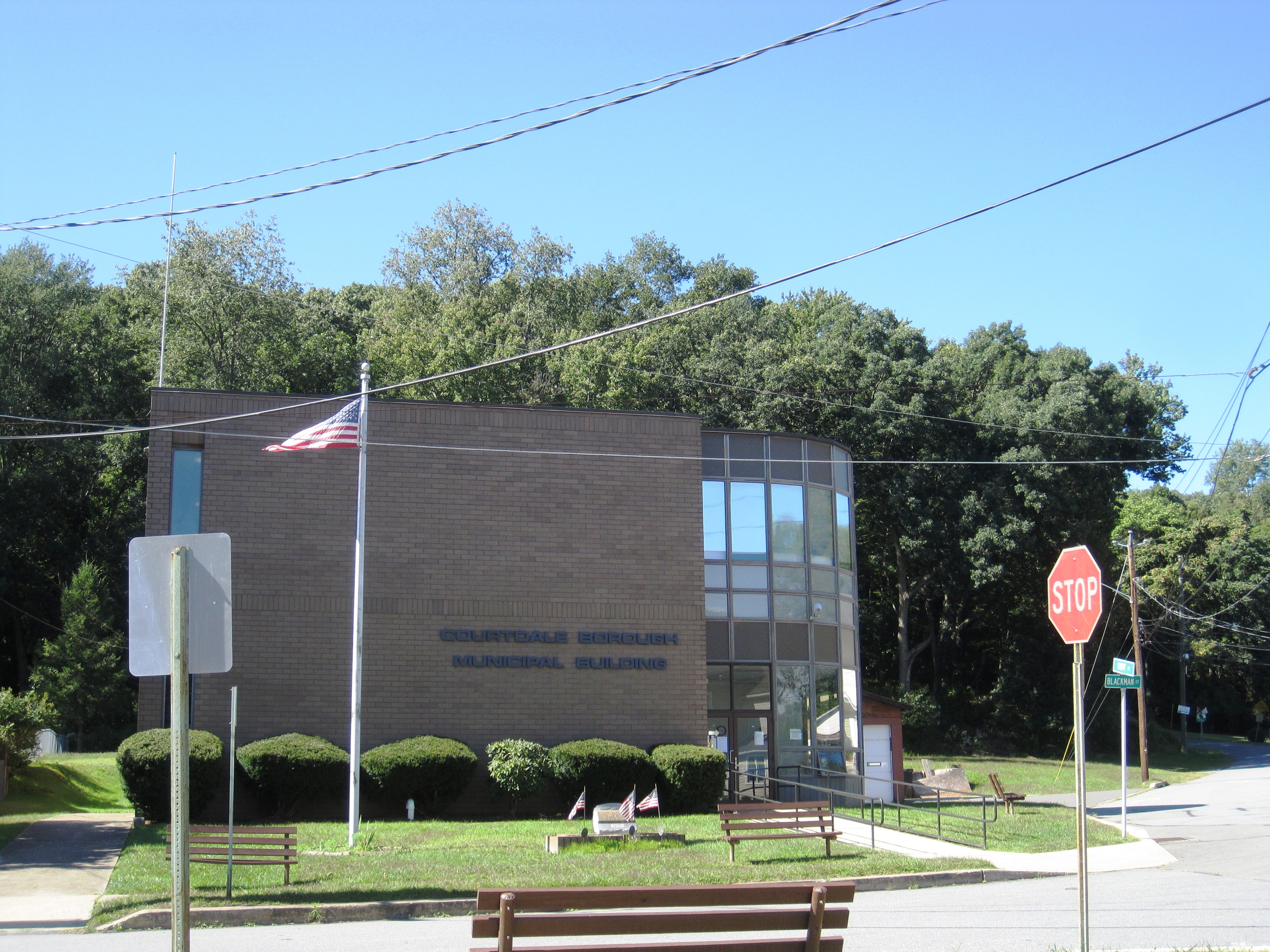
Courtdale Municipal Building

As of the census of 2000, there were 791 people, 315 households, and 230 families residing in the borough. The population density was 771.5 inhabitants per square mile (297.9/km^{2}). There were 328 housing units at an average density of 319.9 units per square mile (123.5 units/km^{2}). The racial makeup of the borough was 99.75% White and 0.25% Asian.

There were 315 households, out of which 27.0% had children under the age of 18 living with them, 58.7% were married couples living together, 9.2% had a female householder with no husband present, and 26.7% were non-families. 24.4% of all households were made up of individuals, and 12.7% had someone living alone who was 65 years of age or older. The average household size was 2.51 and the average family size was 2.97.

In the borough the population was spread out, with 20.9% under the age of 18, 6.3% from 18 to 24, 25.7% from 25 to 44, 28.1% from 45 to 64, and 19.1% who were 65 years of age or older. The median age was 43 years. For every 100 females there were 92.9 males. For every 100 females age 18 and over, there were 92.0 males.

The median income for a household in the borough was $38,150, and the median income for a family was $44,500. Males had a median income of $34,219 versus $25,234 for females. The per capita income for the borough was $17,765. About 7.5% of families and 8.7% of the population were below the poverty line, including 12.0% of those under age 18 and 19.2% of those age 65 or over.

== Education ==
It is in the Wyoming Valley West School District.
