= Chase, Pennsylvania =

Unincorporated community in Pennsylvania, US

- Census-designated place
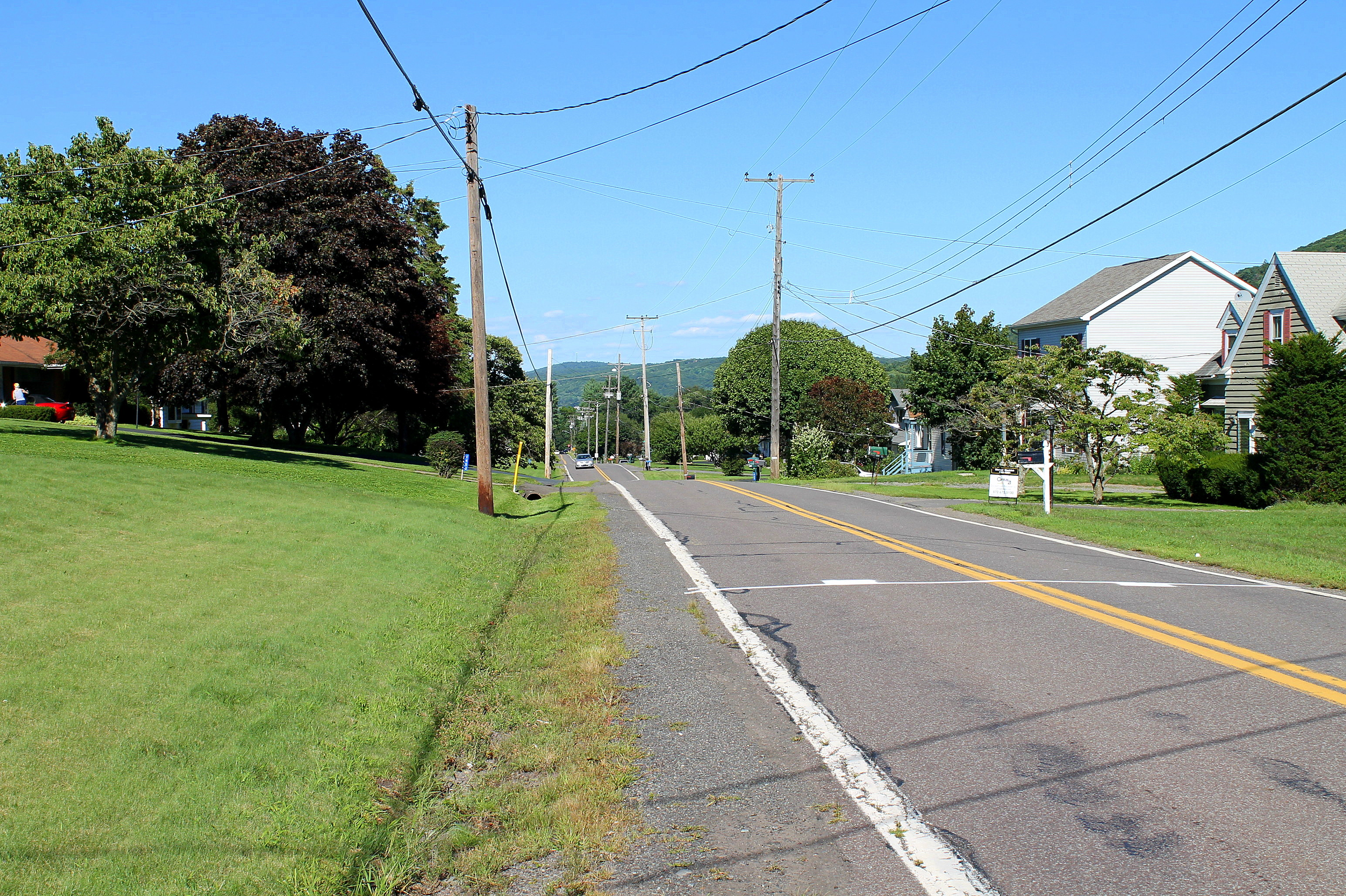
- Street in Chase

- Location in Pennsylvania Location in the United States
- Coordinates: 41°17′5″N 75°57′46″W
- Country: United States
- State: Pennsylvania
- County: Luzerne
- Township: Jackson

Area
  - Total: 2.29 sq mi (5.94 km^{2})
  - Land: 2.29 sq mi (5.93 km^{2})
  - Water: 0.0039 sq mi (0.01 km^{2})

Population (2020)
  - Total: 928
  - Density: 405.3/sq mi (156.48/km^{2})
- Time zone: UTC-5 (Eastern (EST))
  - Summer (DST): UTC-4 (EDT)
- ZIP code: 18708
- Area code: 570
- FIPS code: 42-12864

Chase is a census-designated place (CDP) in Jackson Township, Luzerne County, Pennsylvania, United States. The CDP population was 978 at the 2010 census.

== Geography ==
Chase is located at 41°17′5″N 75°57′46″W.

According to the United States Census Bureau, the CDP has a total area of 2.3 square miles (5.9 km^{2}), all land. Chase is centered on the intersection of Huntsville Road and Chase Road (in a valley to the north of Larksville Mountain). Larksville Borough is 3 miles (5 km) to the south (on the opposite side of the mountain). PA 309 and the village of Trucksville are 2 miles (3 km) to the northeast.

== Demographics ==
Historical population
Census	Pop.	Note	%±
2020	928		—
U.S. Decennial Census

The 2020 United States census gave the population as 928 people.

== Education ==
The school district is Lake-Lehman School District.
