= Dallas Township, Pennsylvania =

Township in Pennsylvania, US

Coordinates: 41°22′36″N 75°58′59″W

- Township
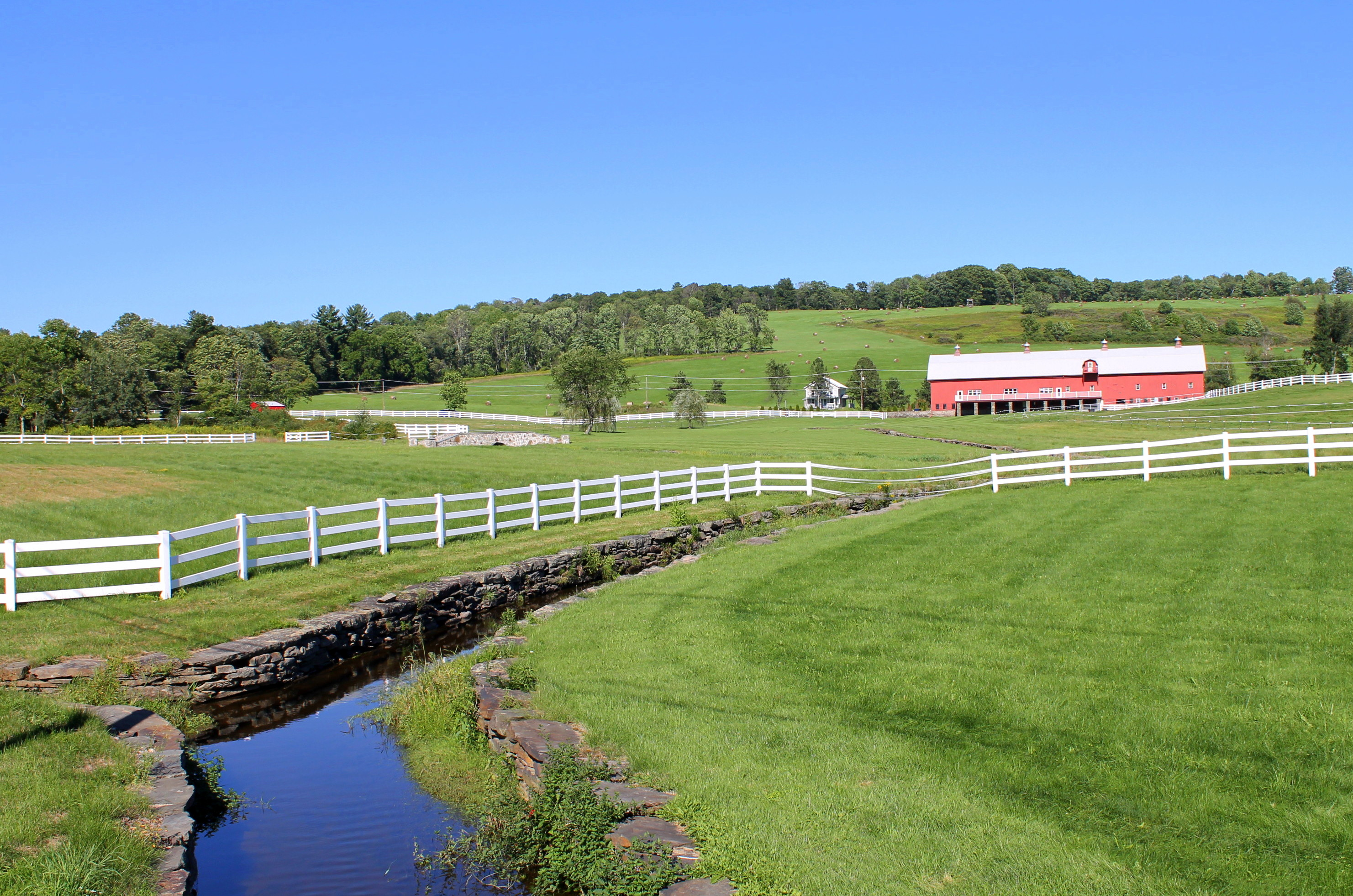
- Scenery of Dallas Township from Lower Demunds Road

- Seal

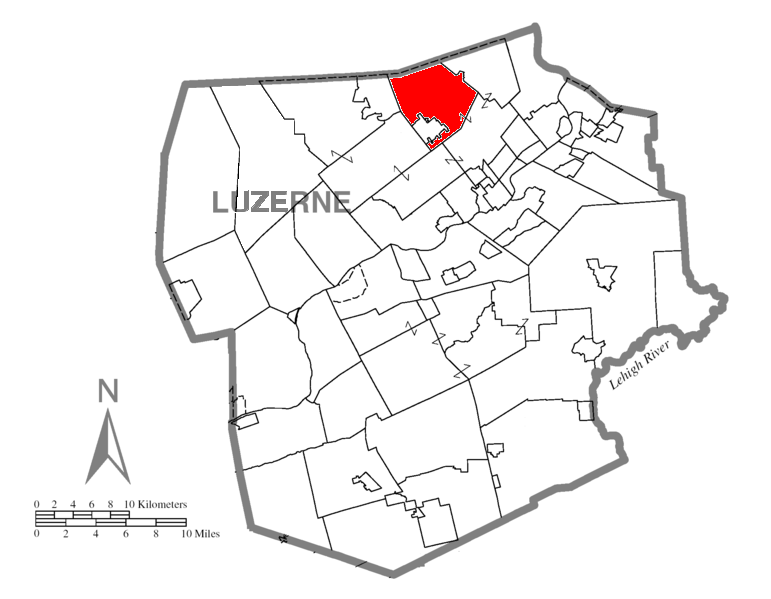
- Map of Luzerne County highlighting Dallas Township

- Map of Pennsylvania highlighting Luzerne County
- Country: United States
- State: Pennsylvania
- County: Luzerne

Area
  - Total: 19.02 sq mi (49.26 km^{2})
  - Land: 18.82 sq mi (48.74 km^{2})
  - Water: 0.20 sq mi (0.53 km^{2})

Population (2020)
  - Total: 9,099
  - Estimate (2025): 9,554 ▲
  - Density: 484/sq mi (186.7/km^{2})
- Time zone: UTC-5 (Eastern (EST))
  - Summer (DST): UTC-4 (EDT)
- Postal code: 18612
- Area code: 570
- FIPS code: 42-079-18056
- Website: www.dallastwp.org

Dallas Township is a township in Luzerne County, Pennsylvania, United States. It is part of the Back Mountain, a 118 square mile (306 km^{2}) region in northern Luzerne County. The population was 9,099 at the 2020 census.

== History ==
In 1797, Ephraim McCoy, a Revolutionary War soldier, was one of the first known white settlers to construct a log cabin near modern-day Dallas. Additional settlers followed in McCoy's footsteps. Sawmills were constructed along Toby Creek in the early 19th century. Sections of the township were converted into farmland following the clearing of trees.

The township was formed in 1817 from territory taken from Kingston Township, and it was named for Alexander J. Dallas, who was the 6th United States Secretary of the Treasury and also the father of George M. Dallas, the vice president of James K. Polk.

== Geography ==
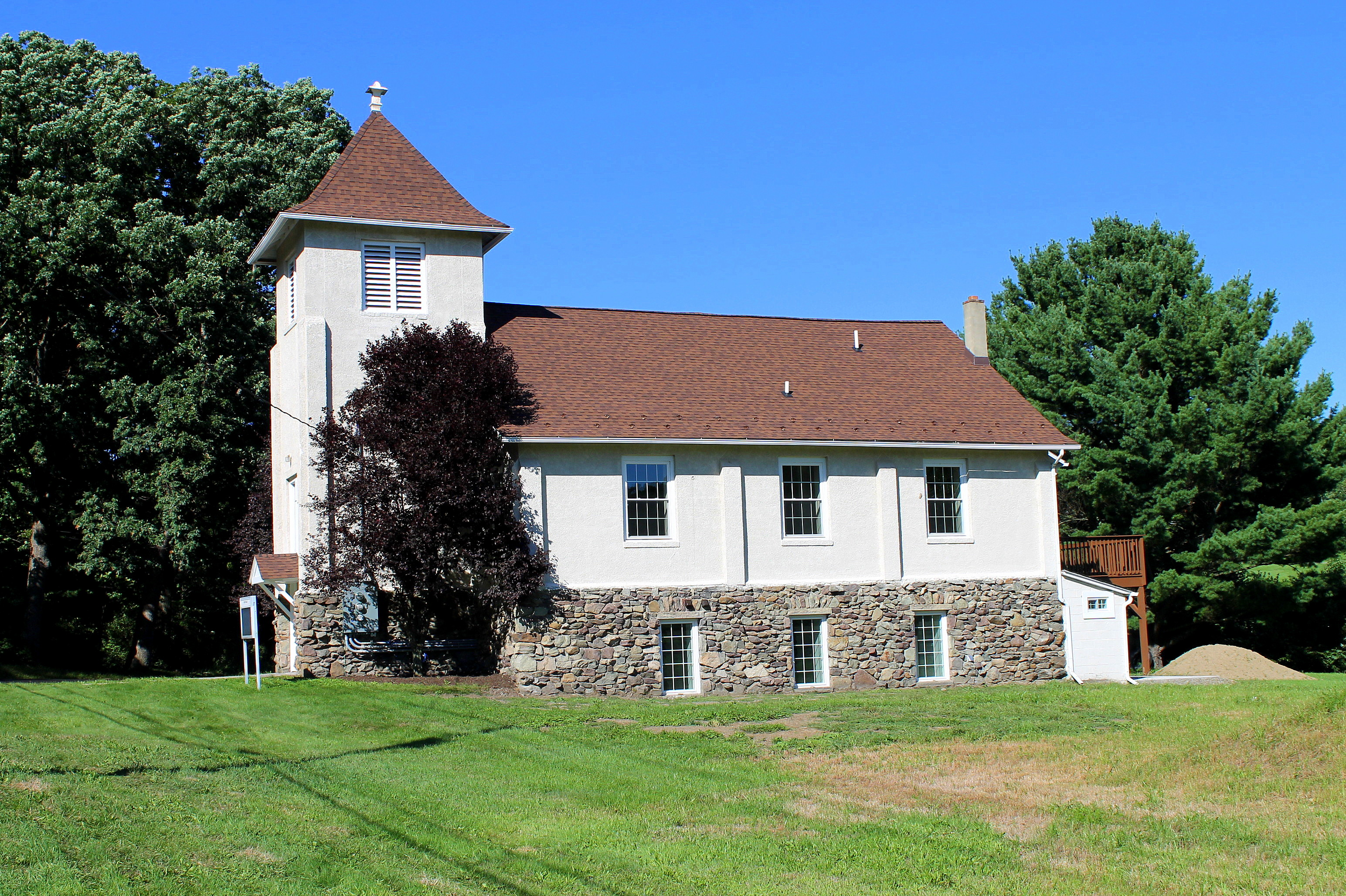
Church in Dallas Township

According to the United States Census Bureau, the township has a total area of 19.0 square miles (49.3 km^{2}), of which 18.8 square miles (48.7 km^{2}) is land and 0.19 square miles (0.5 km^{2}), or 1.07%, is water.

The southern portion of the township is densely populated. The rest of Dallas Township consists of farmland and forests. Kunkle is a small village in the northern half of Dallas Township. There are also several lakes and creeks (e.g., Toby Creek, Huntsville Creek, and Leonard Creek) scattered throughout the community.

PA 309 is the main highway in the township; it runs north to south through the community. Other numbered routes include PA 118 and PA 415.

== Demographics ==
Historical population
Census	Pop.	Note	%±
2000	8,179		—
2010	8,994		10.0%
2020	9,099		1.2%
2025 (est.)	9,554		5.0%

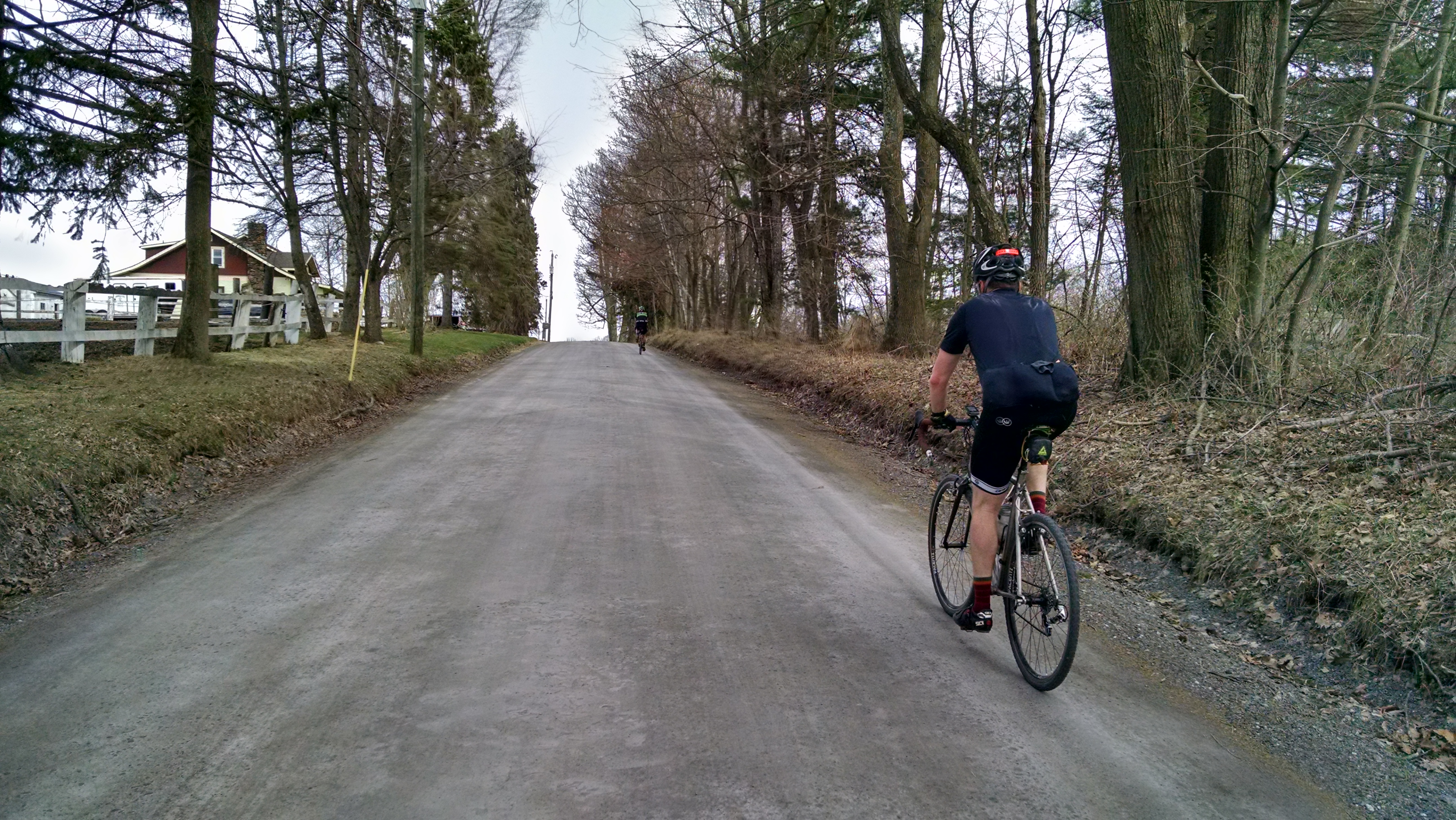
Road in Dallas Township

As of the 2020 census, there were 9,099 people and 3,314 households living in the township, with an average 2.45 persons per household. The racial makeup of the township was 96.4% White, 1.2% African American, 0.07% Native American, 0.8% Asian, 0.0% Pacific Islander, and 0.6% from two or more races. Hispanic or Latino of any race were 1.2% of the population. 3.1% of the population spoke a language other than English at home, and 1.4% were foreign born.

The population distribution of the township was 19.0% below the age of 18, 57% between 19 and 64, and 24.0% over the age of 65. 95.2% of the population had a high school degree or higher, while 40% had a bachelor's degree or higher.

The median income for a household in the township was $70,250. The per capita income for the township was $36,291. About 10.6% of the population were below the poverty line.

As of the census of 2000, there were 8,179 people, 2,917 households, and 2,047 families living in the township. The population density was 436.7 inhabitants per square mile (168.6/km^{2}). There were 3,125 housing units at an average density of 166.9 per square mile (64.4/km^{2}). The racial makeup of the township was 98.45% White, 0.21% African American, 0.06% Native American, 0.72% Asian, 0.01% Pacific Islander, 0.13% from other races, and 0.42% from two or more races. Hispanic or Latino of any race were 0.56% of the population.

There were 2,917 households, out of which 30.8% had children under the age of 18 living with them, 59.5% were married couples living together, 7.5% had a female householder with no husband present, and 29.8% were non-families. 26.3% of all households were made up of individuals, and 14.6% had someone living alone who was 65 years of age or older. The average household size was 2.49 and the average family size was 3.01.

In the township the population was spread out, with 21.1% under the age of 18, 12.1% from 18 to 24, 23.5% from 25 to 44, 23.2% from 45 to 64, and 20.2% who were 65 years of age or older. The median age was 41 years. For every 100 females, there were 82.0 males. For every 100 females age 18 and over, there were 74.8 males.

In January 2025, Dallas Township enacted Ordinance No. 1 of 2025, establishing regulations for student housing within the township. Under the ordinance, a "student home" — defined as a single-family dwelling housing up to four students — requires a special exception permit and must contain a minimum of 1,500 square feet of living area, excluding basements, garages, and accessory buildings. To limit the concentration of student rentals, no student home may be located within 1,000 feet of another student home's property line, and owners are required to obtain an annual license from the township and register the names and contact information of all student residents.

== Education ==
Dallas Township is part of Dallas School District.

The majority of the Misericordia University property, and all of the census-designated place, are located within the township.

== Notable person ==
- Rob Bresnahan – U.S. representative
