= Browns Creek (Utah) =

Stream in Garfield County, Utah, U.S.

Coordinates: 37.9463761°N 110.7304284°W

Browns Creek is a stream in Garfield County, Utah, United States.

Browns Creek was named for Captain Brown, a "renegade" who camped nearby.

== See also ==
- List of rivers of Utah
