= Pringle, Pennsylvania =

Borough in Pennsylvania, US

- Borough
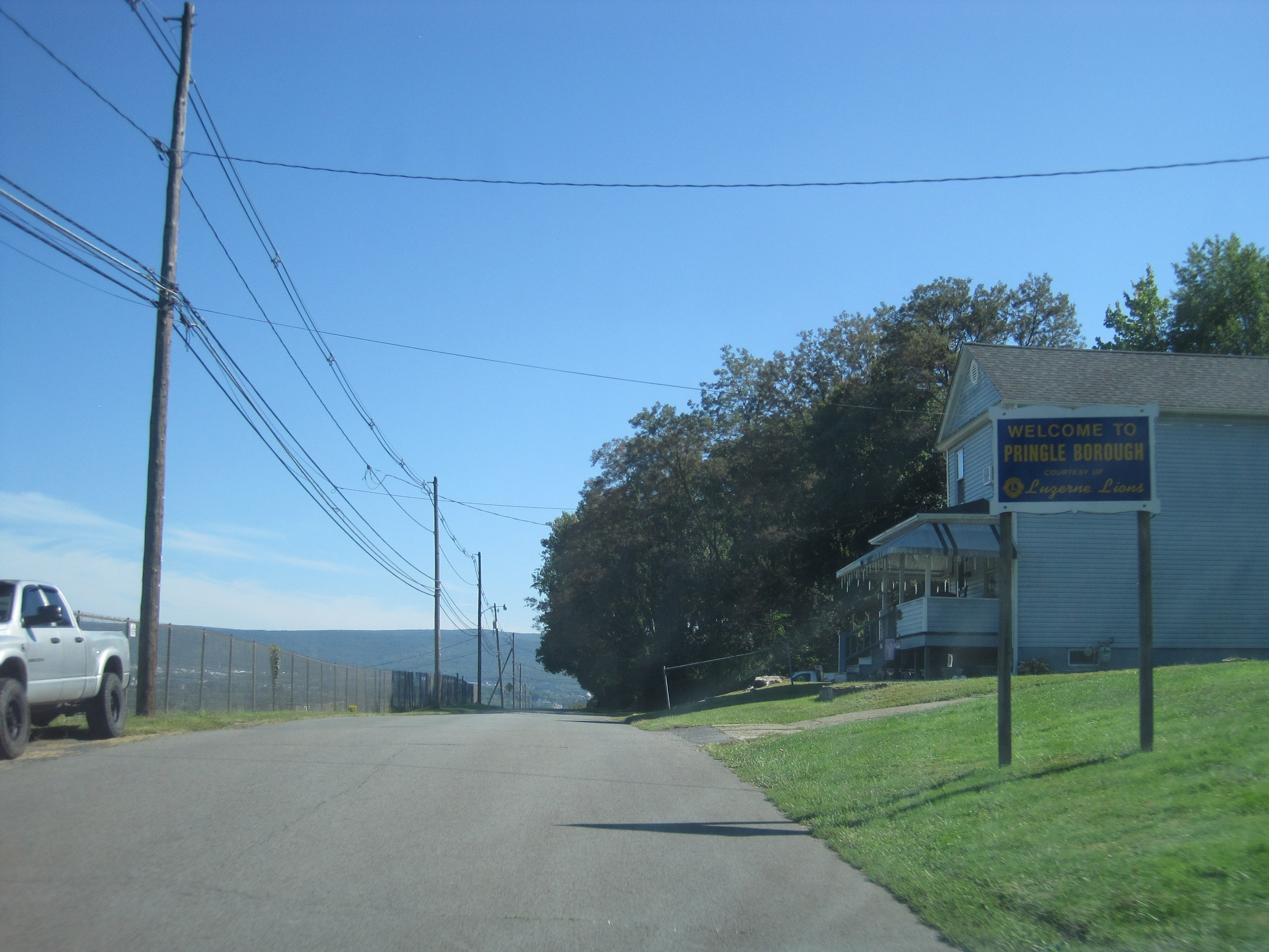
- Entering Pringle along Courtright Street

- Location of Pringle in Luzerne County, Pennsylvania

- Location within Pennsylvania Location within the United States
- Coordinates: 41°16′34″N 75°53′58″W
- Country: United States
- State: Pennsylvania
- County: Luzerne
- Incorporated: 1914

Government
  - Type: Borough Council

Area
  - Total: 0.46 sq mi (1.19 km^{2})
  - Land: 0.46 sq mi (1.19 km^{2})
  - Water: 0 sq mi (0.00 km^{2})

Population (2020)
  - Total: 893
  - Density: 1,942.1/sq mi (749.85/km^{2})
- Time zone: UTC-5 (Eastern (EST))
  - Summer (DST): UTC-4 (EDT)
- Area code: 570
- FIPS code: 42-62712

Pringle is a borough in Luzerne County, Pennsylvania, United States. As of the 2020 census, Pringle had a population of 893.

== History ==
Pringle was incorporated as a borough on January 17, 1914; it was named in honor of Thomas Pringle.

== Geography ==
According to the United States Census Bureau, the borough has a total area of 0.46 square miles (1.2 km^{2}), all land.

== Demographics ==
Historical population
Census	Pop.	Note	%±
1910	1,875		—
1920	1,960		4.5%
1930	2,372		21.0%
1940	2,000		−15.7%
1950	1,727		−13.6%
1960	1,418		−17.9%
1970	1,155		−18.5%
1980	1,221		5.7%
1990	1,161		−4.9%
2000	991		−14.6%
2010	979		−1.2%
2020	893		−8.8%
2021 (est.)	892	▼	−0.1%

At the 2000 census there were nine hundred and ninety-one people, four hundred and thirty-two households, and two hundred eighty families in the borough.

The population density was 2,130.5 inhabitants per square mile (822.6/km^{2}). There were four hundred and fifty-nine housing units at an average density of 986.8 per square mile (381.0/km^{2}).

The racial makeup of the borough was 99.90% White, and 0.10% from two or more races. Hispanic or Latino of any race were 1.01%.

There were four hundred and thirty-two households; 23.8% had children under the age of eighteen living with them, 46.8% were married couples living together, 13.2% had a female householder with no husband present, and 35.0% were non-families. 32.2% of households were made up of individuals, and 17.1% were one-person households with residents aged sixty-five or older.

The average household size was 2.29 and the average family size was 2.89.

The age distribution was 19.7% under the age of eighteen, 6.7% from eighteen to twenty-four, 25.9% from twenty-five to forty-four, 26.8% from forty-five to sixty-four, and 20.9% who were aged sixty-five or older. The median age was forty-four years.

For every one hundred females there were 93.9 males. For every one hundred females aged eighteen and over, there were 91.3 males.

The median household income was $31,793 and the median family income was $43,750. Males had a median income of $26,801 versus $23,500 for females.

The per capita income for the borough was $19,108.

Roughly 8.0% of families and 9.2% of the population were below the poverty line, including 14.8% of those under age eighteen and 10.8% of those aged sixty-five or over.

== Education ==
Pringle is part of the Wyoming Valley West School District. The borough is home to the West Side Career and Technology Center.

== Gallery ==
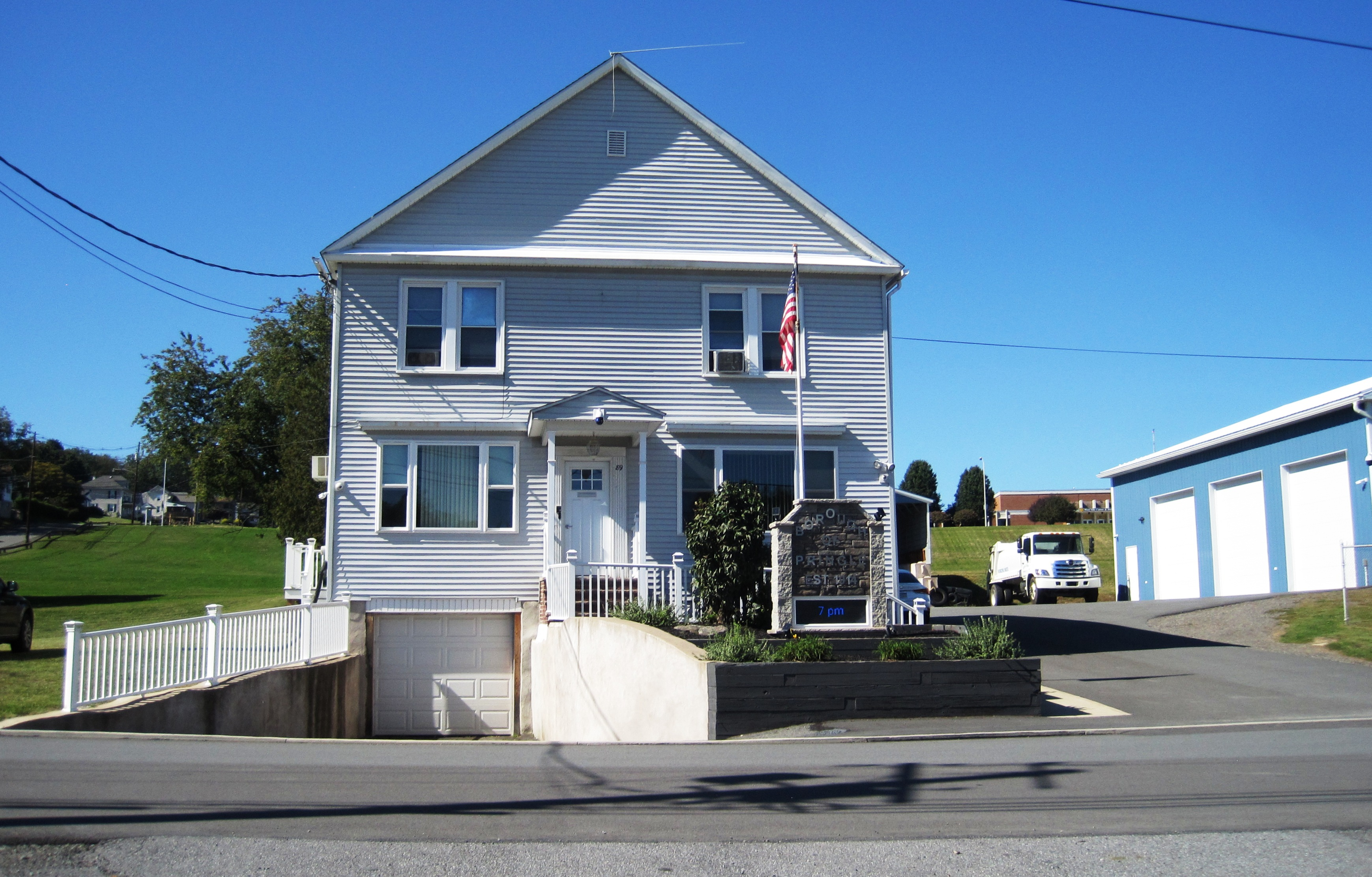
Pringle municipal building

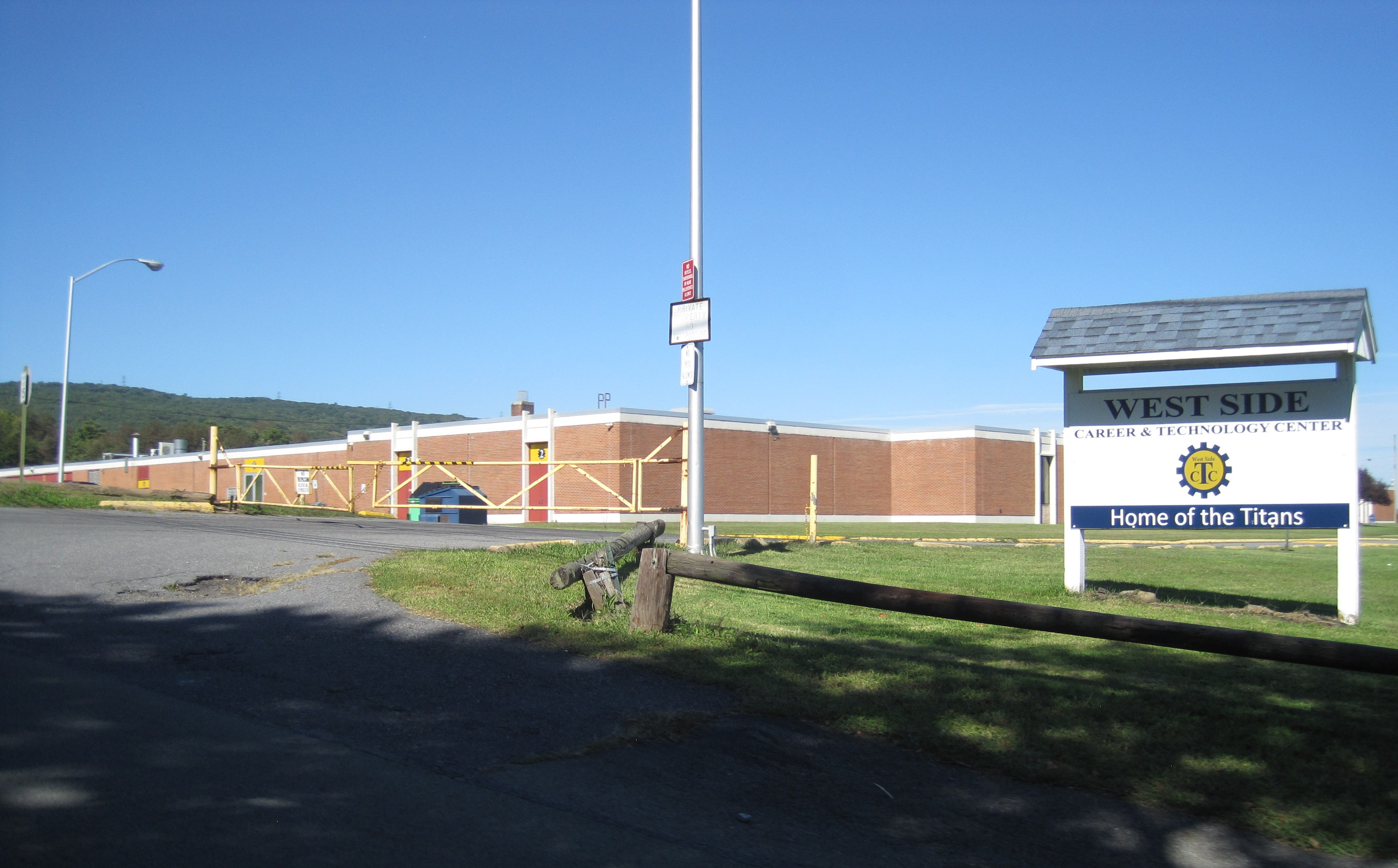
West Side Career and Technology Center in Pringle
