= Jackson Township, Luzerne County, Pennsylvania =

Township in Pennsylvania, US

Coordinates: 41°16′48″N 75°59′00″W

- Township
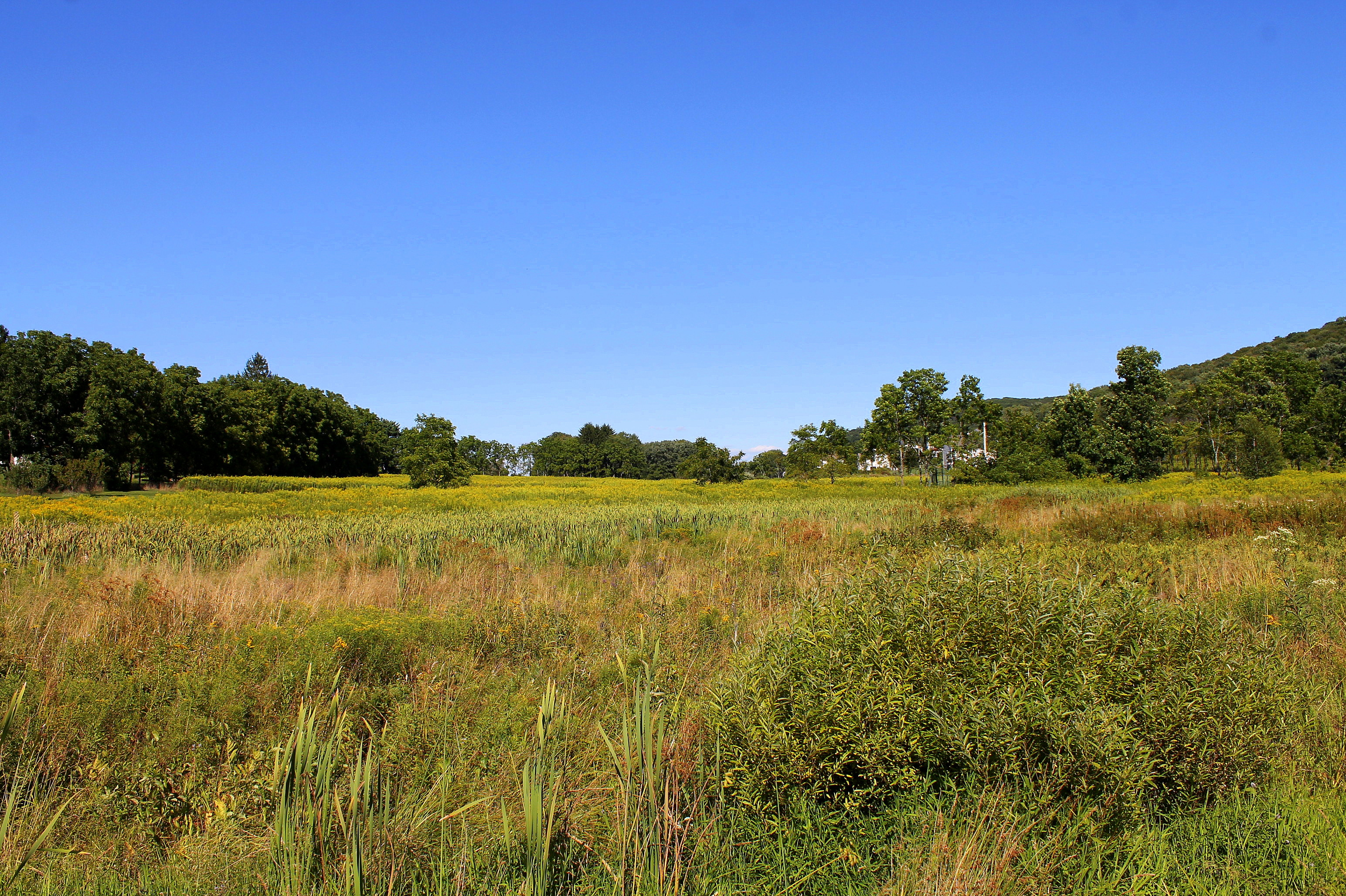
- Jackson Township looking eastward near Chase

- Seal

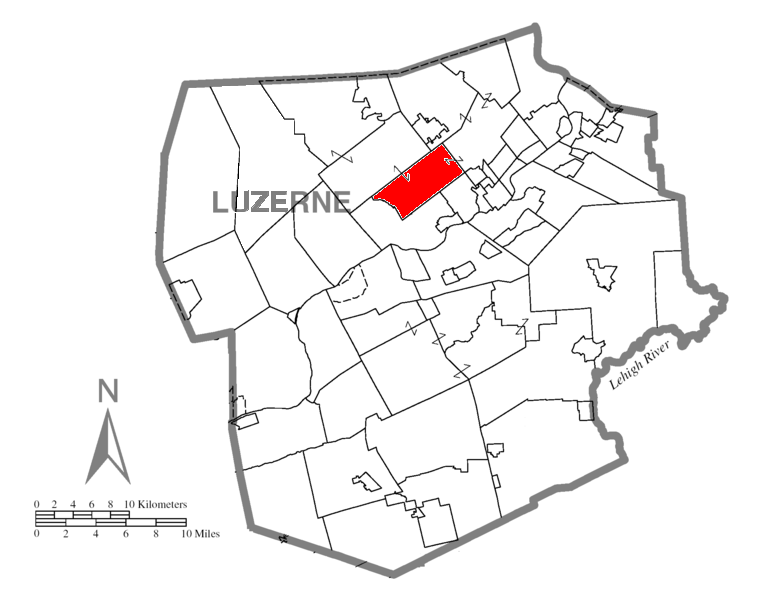
- Map of Luzerne County highlighting Jackson Township

- Map of Pennsylvania highlighting Luzerne County
- Country: United States
- State: Pennsylvania
- County: Luzerne
- Incorporated: 1844

Area
  - Total: 13.38 sq mi (34.65 km^{2})
  - Land: 13.29 sq mi (34.43 km^{2})
  - Water: 0.085 sq mi (0.22 km^{2})

Population (2020)
  - Total: 4,761 ▲
  - Estimate (2021): 4,789
  - Density: 348.6/sq mi (134.58/km^{2})
- Time zone: UTC-5 (Eastern (EST))
  - Summer (DST): UTC-4 (EDT)
- FIPS code: 42-079-37400
- Website: jacksonluzpa.com

Jackson Township is a township in Luzerne County, Pennsylvania, United States. It is part of the Back Mountain, a 118 square mile region in northern Luzerne County. The population was 4,761 as of the 2020 census.

== History ==
=== Settlement ===
In 1795, the first white settler constructed a permanent home in modern-day Jackson Township; his name was George Palmer Ransom. He was followed by additional settlers (including Thomas Lamoreaux, John Lamoreaux, and Jesse Brown). Jackson Township was formed in 1844 from a portion of Plymouth Township. It originally covered an area of fifteen square miles. The township was named in honor of Andrew Jackson (the seventh President of the United States). Due to its thick forests, the lumber industry was one of the first major employers in the area. In the township's early days, there were roughly nine sawmills and three gristmills. By 1850, the population of Jackson increased to nearly six hundred. Over time, farming replaced logging as the primary industry in the township.

=== Contemporary history ===
==== Vice presidential visit ====
In October 2005, U.S. Vice President Dick Cheney visited the home of Ron and Rhea Simms in Jackson Township. The couple hosted Cheney at a private political fundraiser for Republican Senator Rick Santorum, who was up for re-election in 2006. Two hundred area residents attended the fundraiser ($1,000 per person). The senator raised a total of $300,000. Santorum ultimately lost the election to Bob Casey.

== Geography ==
According to the United States Census Bureau, the township has a total area of 13.4 square miles (34.6 km^{2}), of which 13.3 square miles (34.4 km^{2}) is land and 0.077 square miles (0.2 km^{2}), or 0.64%, is water. There are two noteworthy communities in Jackson Township: Chase and Huntsville (both are located in the eastern half of Jackson). Larksville Mountain defines the southeastern border of the municipality. The territory's interior is made up of creeks and rolling hills (which contains forests and farmland). PA 29 runs through the western half of the township.

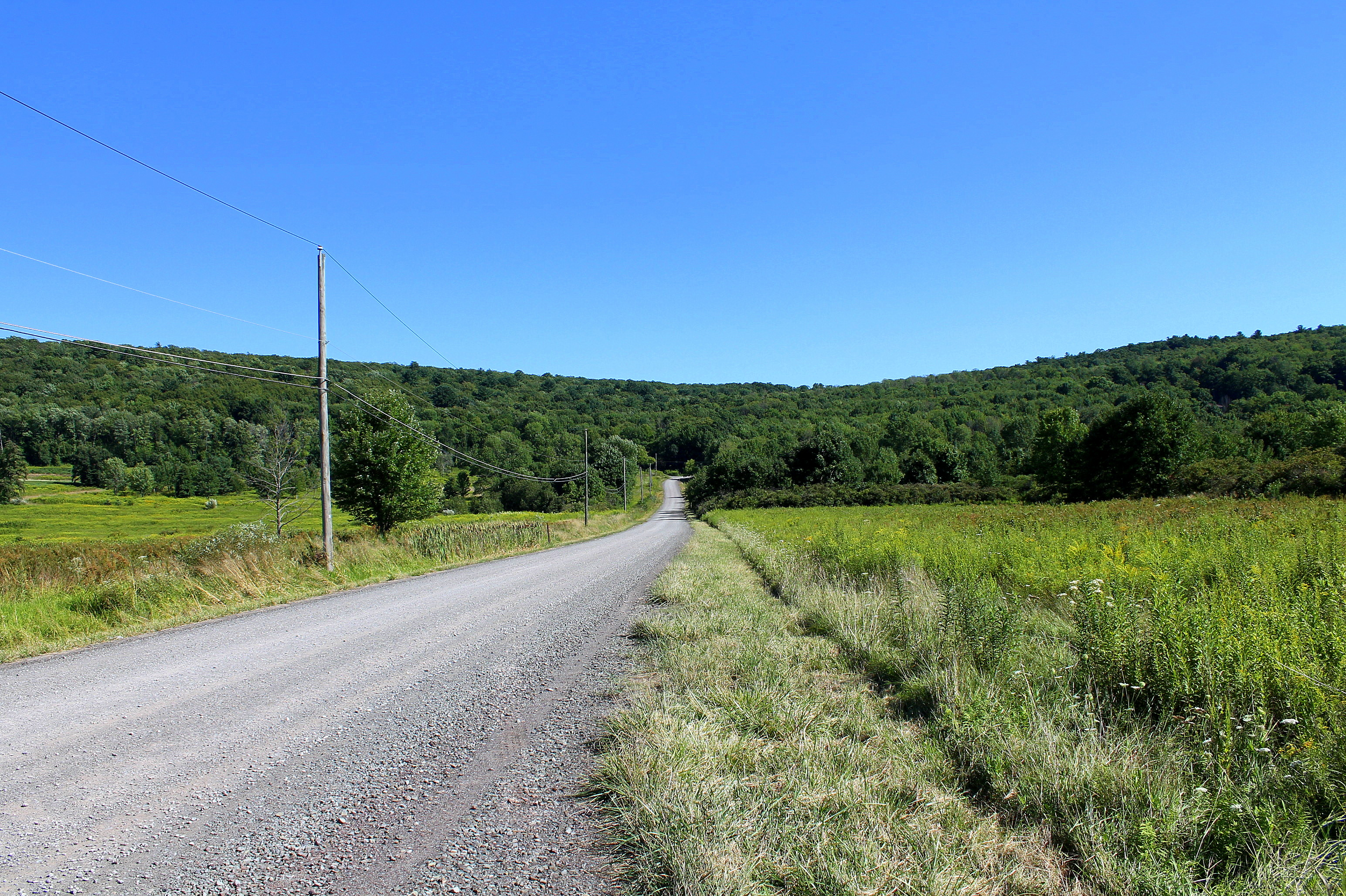
Scenery of Jackson Township looking south near Chase

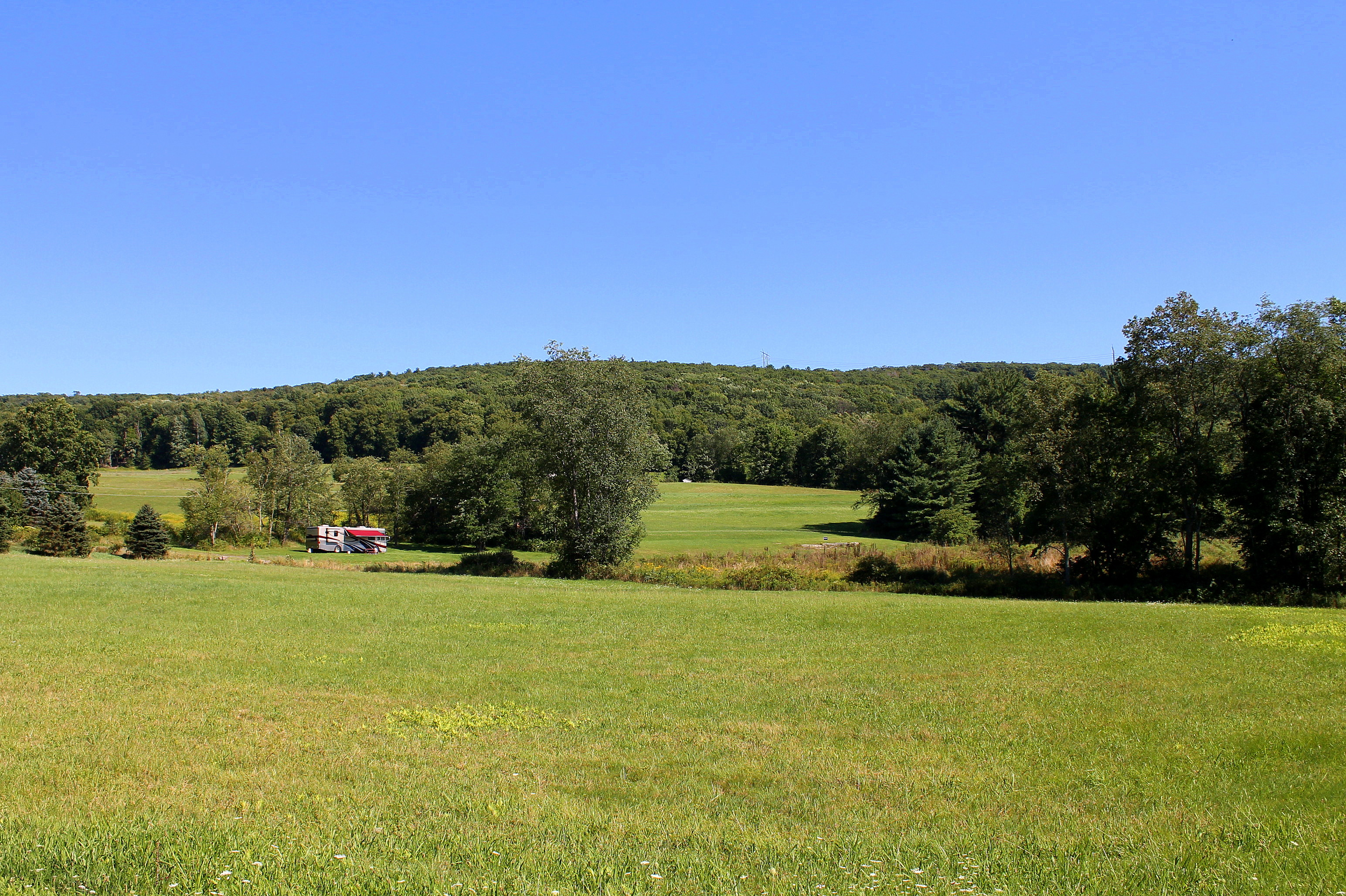
Scenery of Jackson Township west of Chase

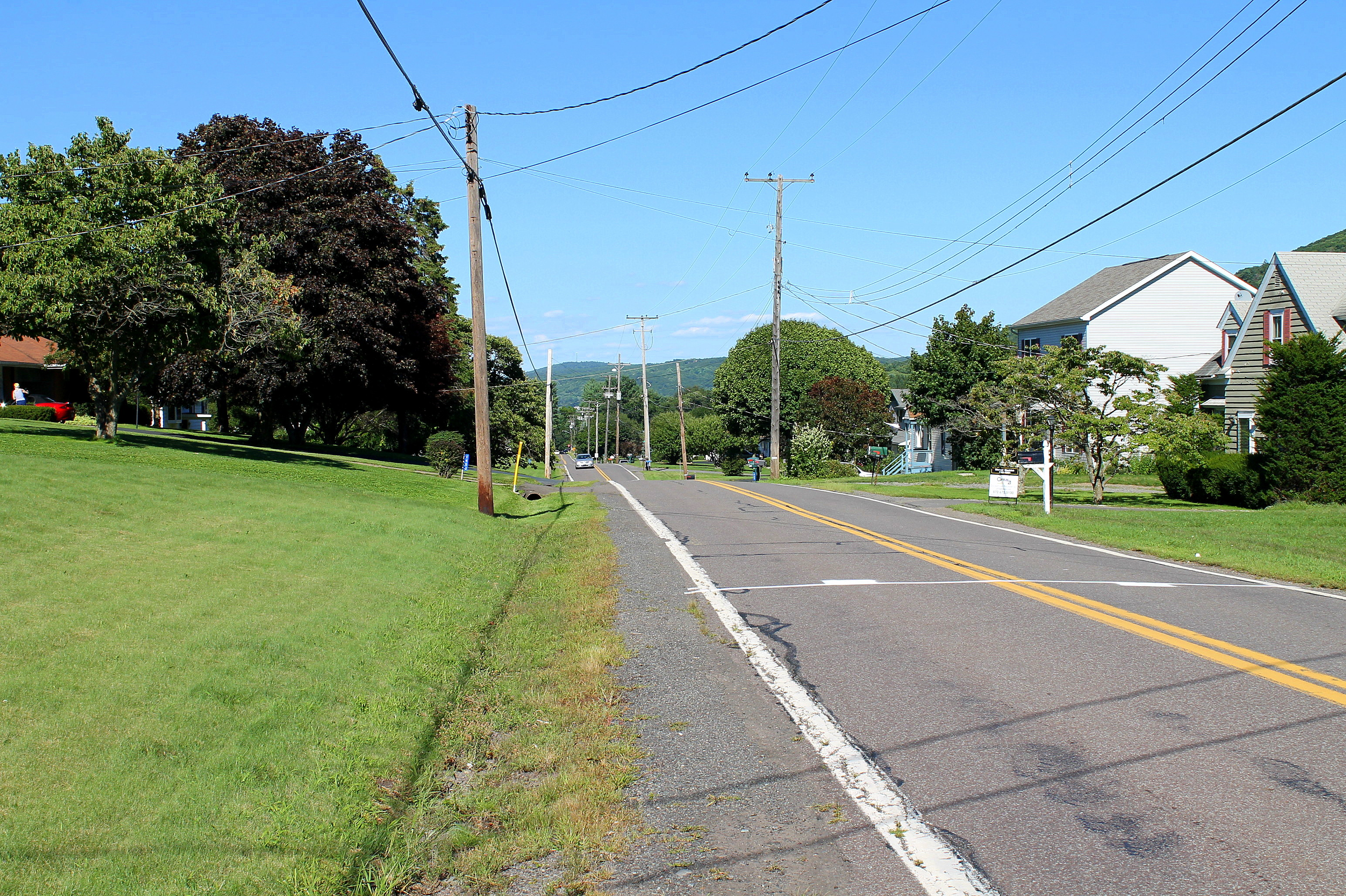
Street in Chase

== Demographics ==
Historical population
Census	Pop.	Note	%±
2000	4,453		—
2010	4,646		4.3%
2020	4,761		2.5%
2021 (est.)	4,789		0.6%
U.S. Decennial Census

As of the census of 2000, there were 4,453 people, 952 households, and 767 families residing in the township. The population density was 335.4 inhabitants per square mile (129.5/km^{2}). There were 1,004 housing units at an average density of 75.6 per square mile (29.2/km^{2}). The racial makeup of the township was 73.01% White, 24.66% African American, 0.11% Native American, 0.90% Asian, 0.02% Pacific Islander, 0.58% from other races, and 0.72% from two or more races. Hispanic or Latino of any race were 4.15% of the population.

There were 952 households, out of which 34.2% had children under the age of 18 living with them, 70.3% were married couples living together, 6.9% had a female householder with no husband present, and 19.4% were non-families. 16.5% of all households were made up of individuals, and 8.4% had someone living alone who was 65 years of age or older. The average household size was 2.71 and the average family size was 3.04.

In the township the population was spread out, with 14.2% under the age of 18, 7.6% from 18 to 24, 40.4% from 25 to 44, 29.5% from 45 to 64, and 8.3% who were 65 years of age or older. The median age was 40 years. For every 100 females, there were 242.8 males. For every 100 females age 18 and over, there were 286.2 males.

The median income for a household in the township was $56,464, and the median income for a family was $62,162. Males had a median income of $33,274 versus $29,643 for females. The per capita income for the township was $25,127. About 4.3% of families and 4.9% of the population were below the poverty line, including 6.3% of those under age 18 and 4.9% of those age 65 or over.
