= Back Mountain =

Region in Pennsylvania

- Region
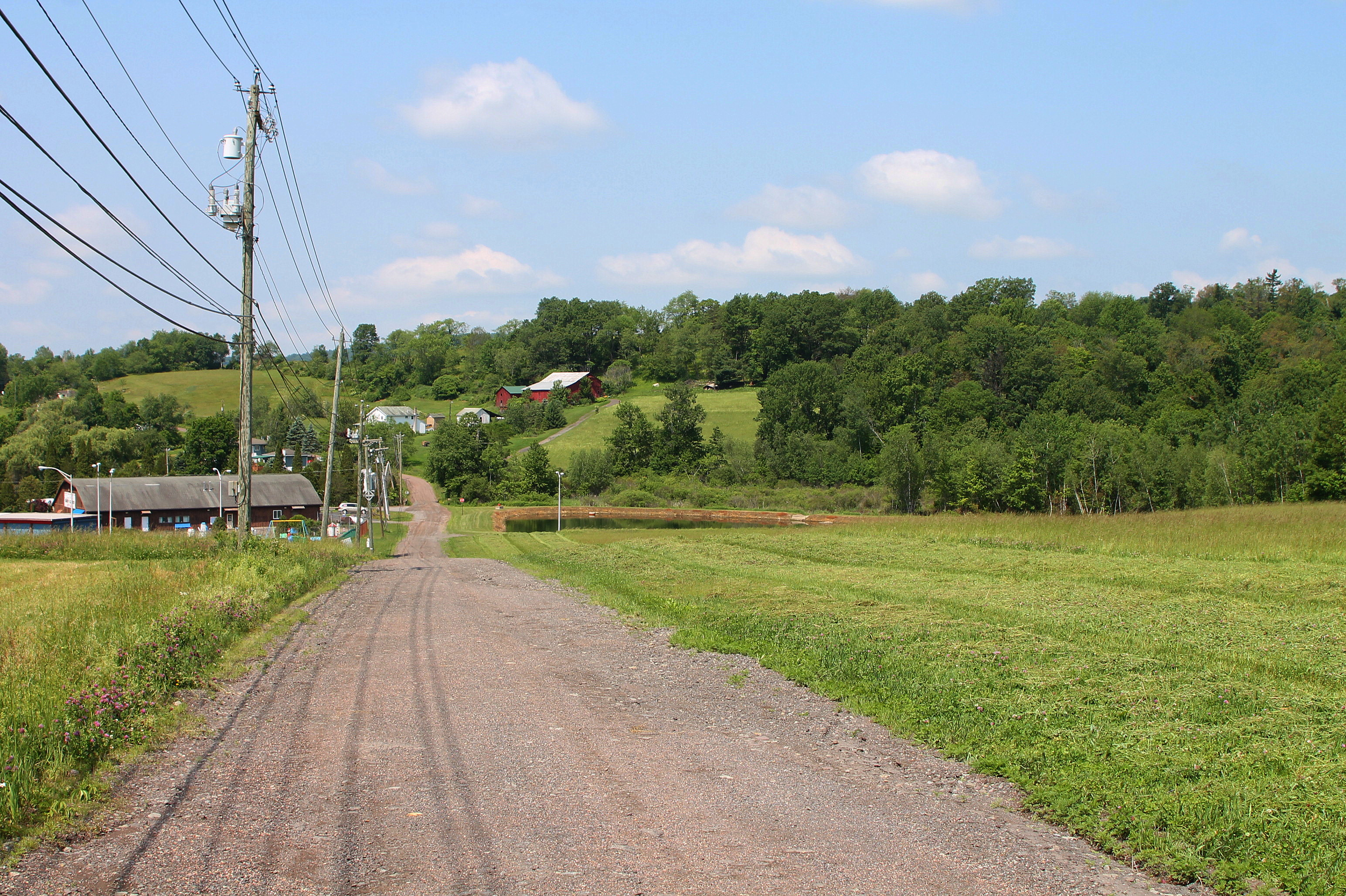
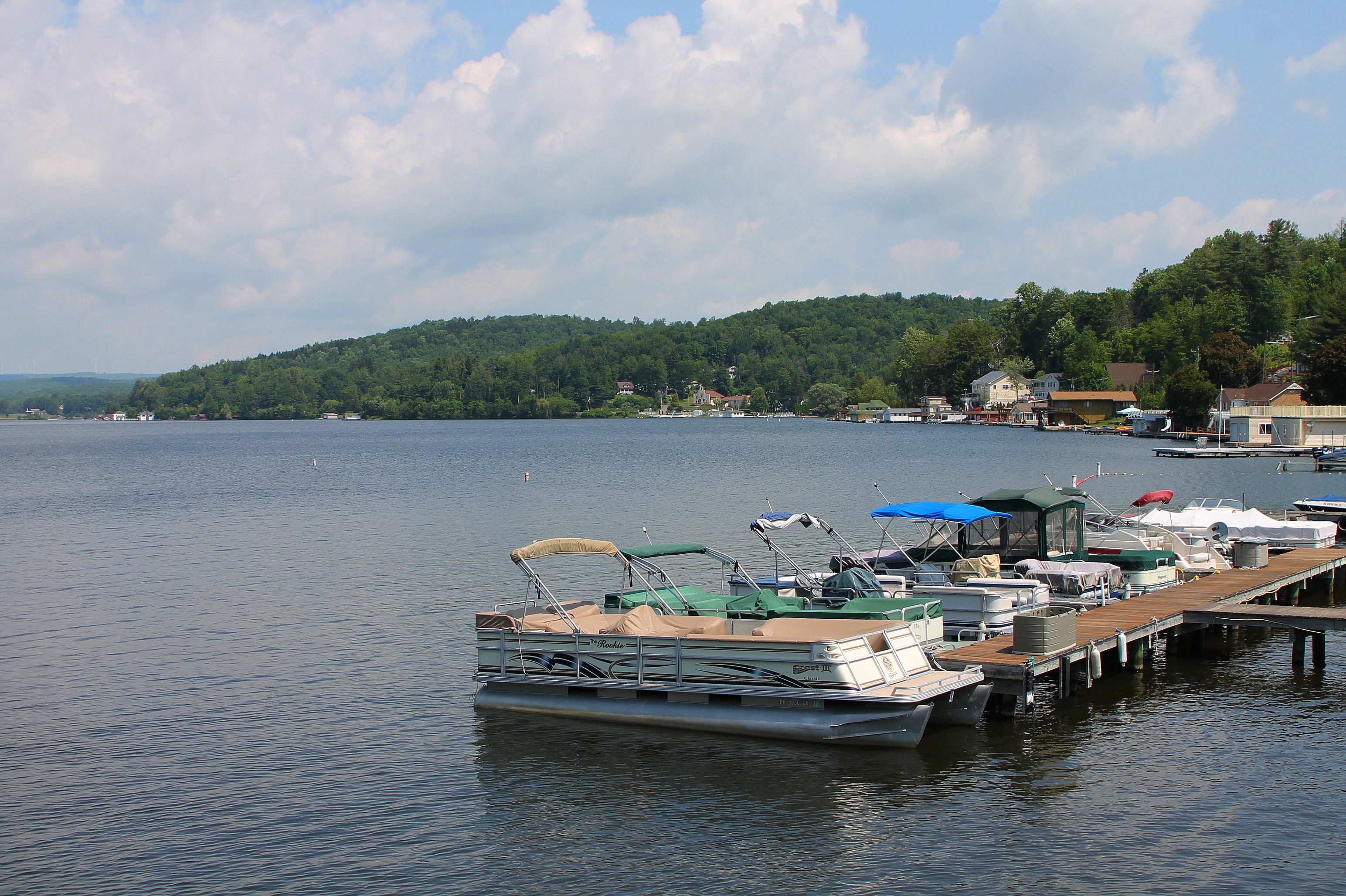
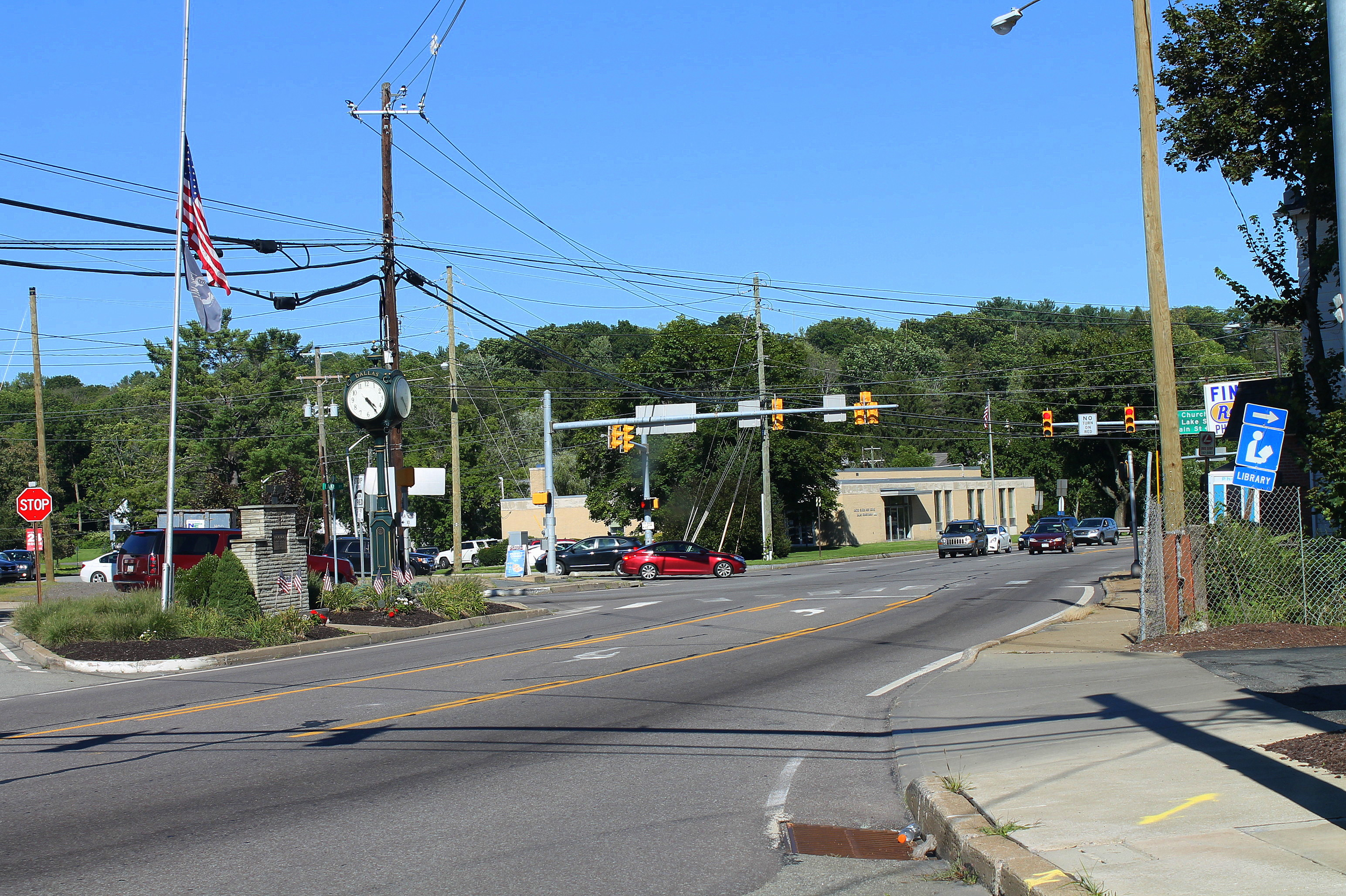
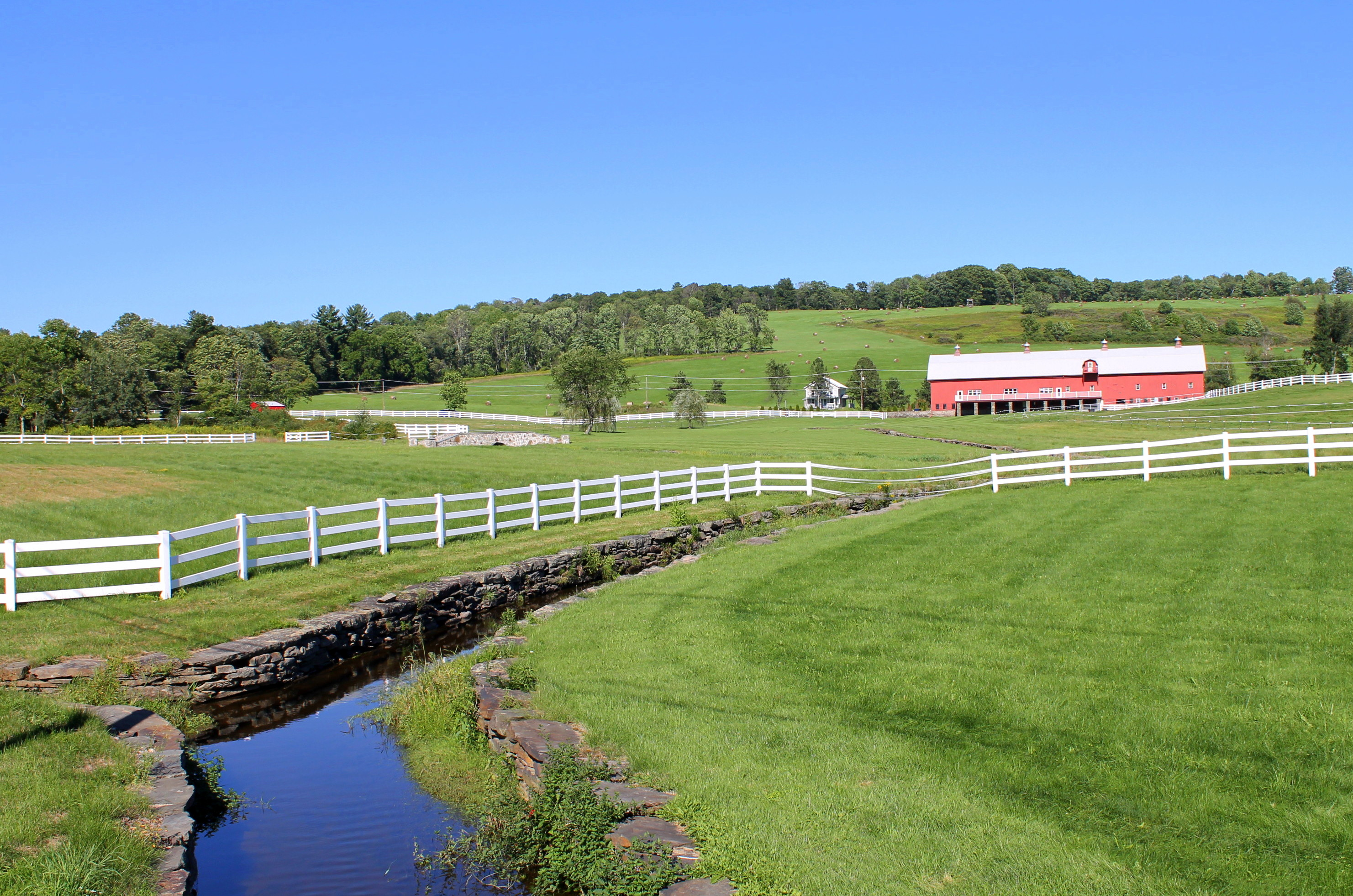
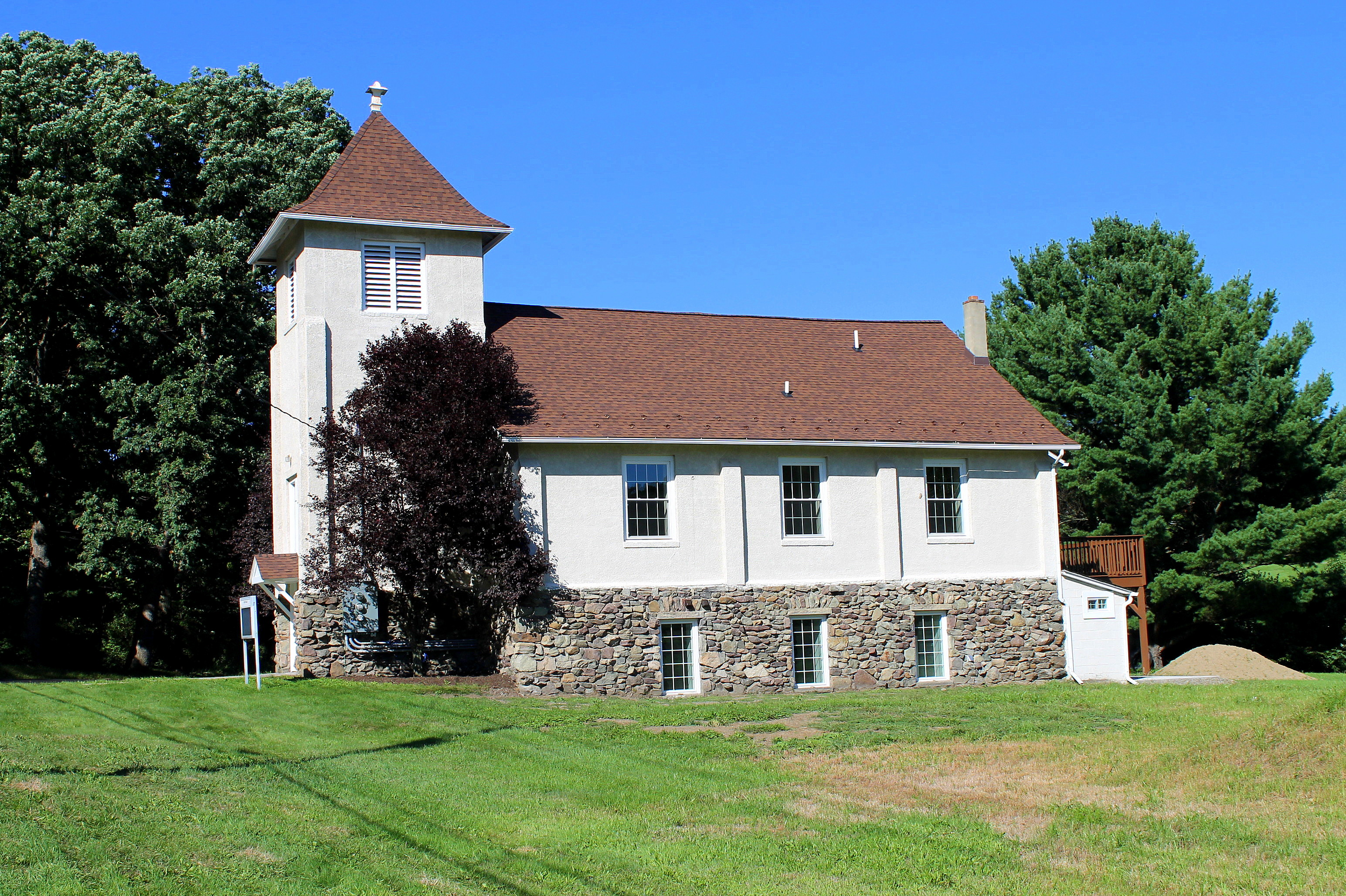
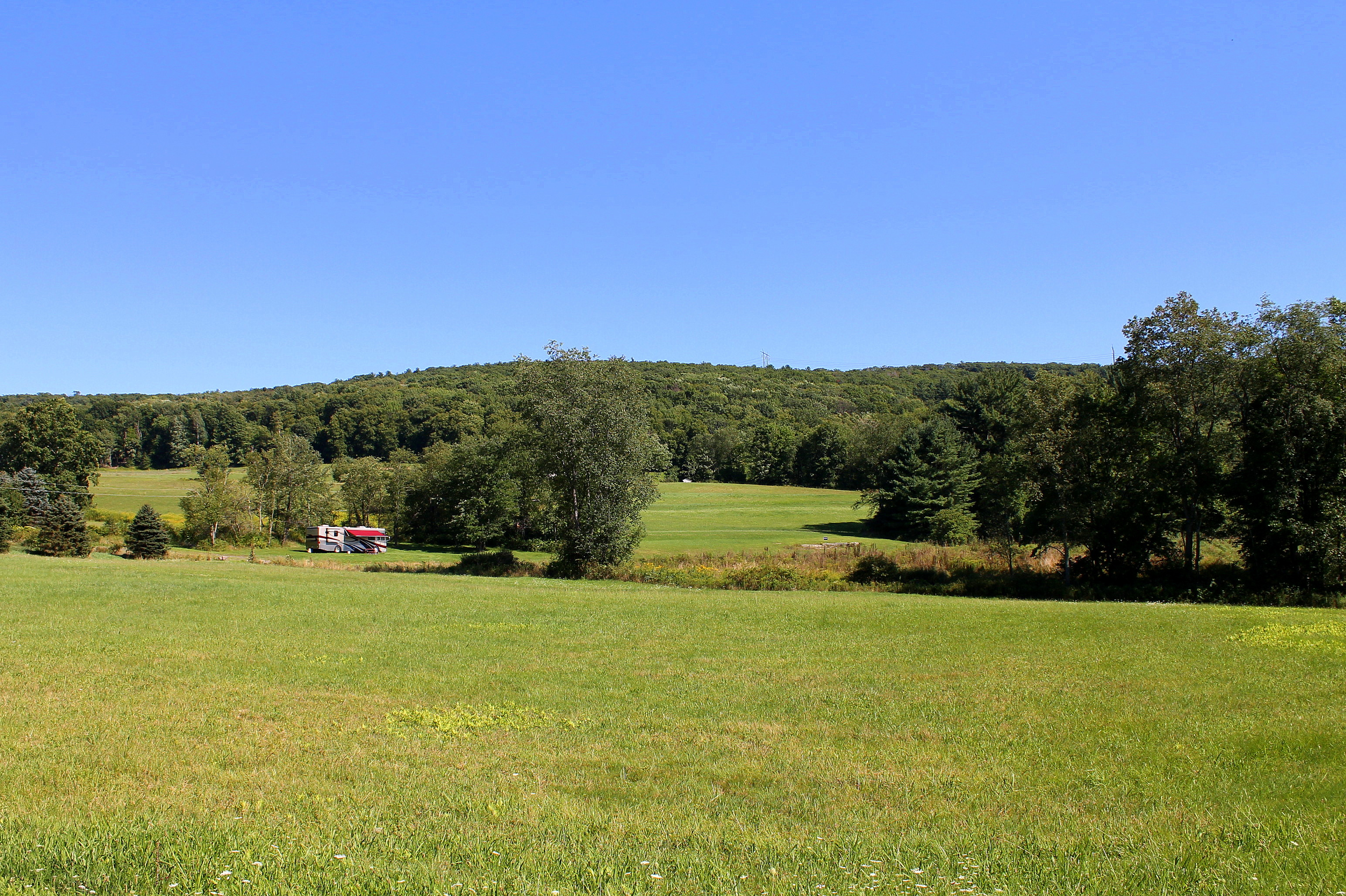
- From top, left to right: Cornell Road in Lehman Township, boats on Harveys Lake, Pennsylvania Route 415 in Dallas, scenery of the Dallas area, a church in the Dallas area, scenery of the Back Mountain Region

- Location of Back Mountain in Pennsylvania Back Mountain (the United States)
- Coordinates: 41°19′13″N 75°58′22″W
- Country: United States
- State: Pennsylvania
- County: Luzerne

Area
  - Total: 117.59 sq mi (304.6 km^{2})

Population (2016)
  - Total: 33,551
  - Density: 285.32/sq mi (110.16/km^{2})
- Time zone: UTC-5 (EST)
  - Summer (DST): UTC-4 (EDT)
- Area code: 570

The Back Mountain is a region and former census-designated place (CDP) in Luzerne County, Pennsylvania, United States. It is near the cities of Scranton and Wilkes-Barre. The population was 33,551 as of 2016. The region has a total area of 117.59 square miles (304.6 km^{2}). The area was not delineated as a CDP for the 2010 census. The name "Back Mountain" refers to the area's location behind the mountain ridge forming the northwest side of the Wyoming Valley. The area includes the townships of Dallas, Franklin, Jackson, Kingston, Lake, and Lehman. The region also includes the boroughs of Dallas and Harveys Lake. Each township and borough is independently governed.

== History ==
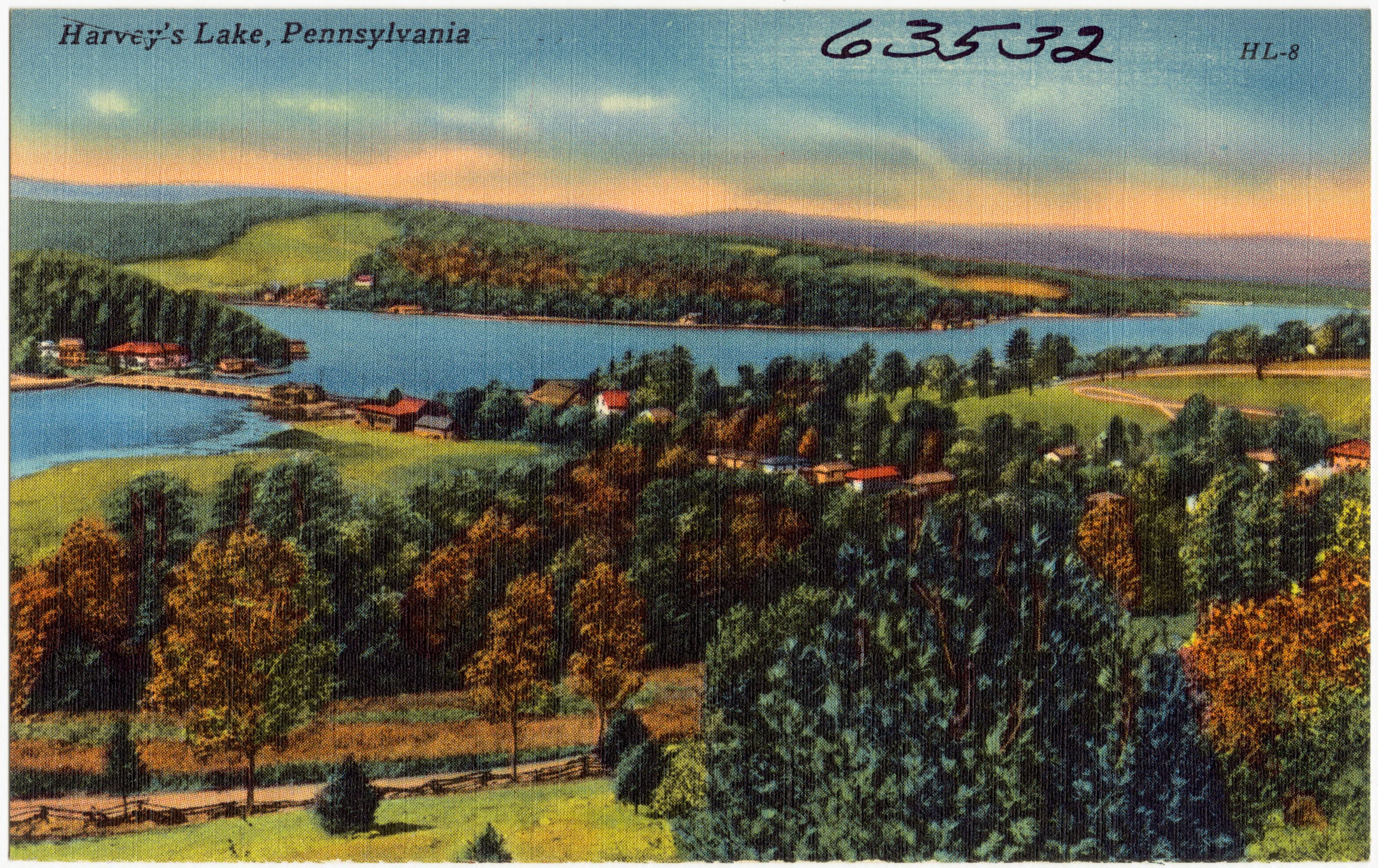
Postcard of Harveys Lake and the Back Mountain (early 20th century)

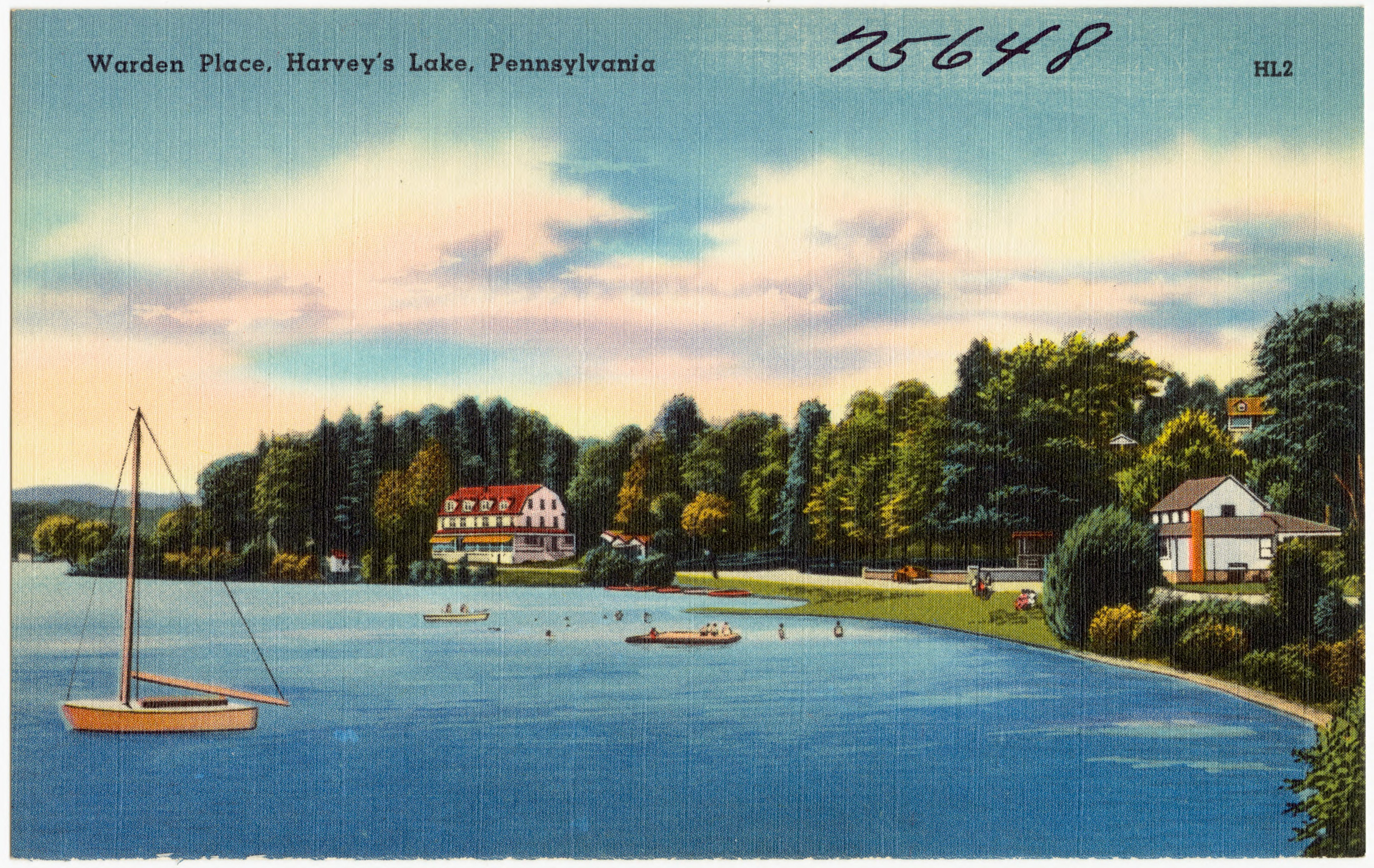
Postcard of Harveys Lake (early 20th century)

The townships of Dallas, Franklin, Jackson, Kingston, Lake, and Lehman were formed in the 1800s. The area now known as Dallas was first settled in 1797. It was incorporated as a borough on April 21, 1879, from a section of Dallas Township. The township, formed in 1817, and was named for Alexander J. Dallas, the 6th United States Secretary of the Treasury and the father of George M. Dallas the vice president of James Polk. The Borough of Dallas is known as the “Pride” of the Back Mountain.

The second borough in the Back Mountain region is Harveys Lake. The lake was named after Benjamin Harvey, who discovered the lake in 1781. He was a member of the Sons of Liberty, an eminent colonial-era group opposed to Great Britain's Stamp Act and a driving force behind the American Revolution. The first resident in the vicinity of the lake, Matthew Scouten, arrived in the early 1790s, others settlers, the Worthingtons, arrived in 1806.

Historically the area offered many forms of recreation and entertainment attracting tourists from all over the Northeast. Harveys Lake became a major resort destination in the early 20th century. Hotels, boathouses, a casino, and an amusement park were constructed around Harveys Lake. Grand Hotel Oneonta was especially prominent in the early 1900s, and former United States President Theodore Roosevelt visited the hotel in August 1912. Harveys Lake was incorporated as a borough in 1968.

Frances Slocum State Park is the only state park in the Back Mountain. In 1968, the lake, which is the centerpiece of the park, was built to control flooding in the North Branch Susquehanna River. In 1972, the park became a temporary home to 280 families who were displaced by the Agnes floods. The park was closed temporarily to the public and reopened in 1974 after all the families were relocated.

== Population and geography ==
As of 2016, 33,551 people lived in the Back Mountain. It consists of six townships and two boroughs. The Back Mountain is located at 41°19′13″N 75°58′22″W (41.320230, -75.972645). The region has a total area of 117.59 square miles (304.6 km^{2}). It is home to Frances Slocum State Park, Lake Louise, and Harveys Lake.

Name of community	Population as of 2016	Total area
Dallas Borough	2,768	2.42 sq mi (6.25 km^{2})
Dallas Township	9,216	18.7 sq mi (48.5 km^{2})
Franklin Township	1,745	13.1 sq mi (33.8 km^{2})
Harveys Lake Borough	2,773	6.17 sq mi (15.99 km^{2})
Jackson Township	4,633	13.4 sq mi (34.6 km^{2})
Kingston Township	6,935	13.9 sq mi (36.0 km^{2})
Lake Township	2,025	26.7 sq mi (69.1 km^{2})
Lehman Township	3,456	23.2 sq mi (60.1 km^{2})
Total	33,551	117.59 sq mi (304.34 km^{2})

== Demographics when it was a CDP ==
As of the census of 2000, there were 26,690 people, 9,267 households, and 6,894 families residing in the census-designated place (CDP). The population density was 249.5 people per square mile (96.3/km^{2}). There were 9,997 housing units at an average density of 93.5/sq mi (36.1/km^{2}). The racial makeup of the CDP was 94.45% White, 4.30% African American, 0.10% Native American, 0.52% Asian, 0.02% Pacific Islander, 0.18% from other races, and 0.43% from two or more races. Hispanic or Latino of any race were 1.05% of the population.

There were 9,267 households, out of which 32.5% had children under the age of 18 living with them, 63.1% were married couples living together, 8.0% had a female householder with no husband present, and 25.6% were non-families. 21.9% of all households were made up of individuals, and 10.8% had someone living alone who was 65 years of age or older. The average household size was 2.57 and the average family size was 3.01.

In the CDP the population was spread out, with 21.5% under the age of 18, 8.4% from 18 to 24, 29.1% from 25 to 44, 26.5% from 45 to 64, and 14.5% who were 65 years of age or older. The median age was 40 years. For every 100 females, there were 107.2 males. For every 100 females age 18 and over, there were 105.7 males.

The median income for a household in the CDP was $49,298, and the median income for a family was $57,342. Males had a median income of $39,566 versus $27,202 for females. The per capita income for the CDP was $23,105. About 4.8% of families and 6.5% of the population were below the poverty line, including 6.6% of those under age 18 and 8.2% of those age 65 or over.

== Education ==
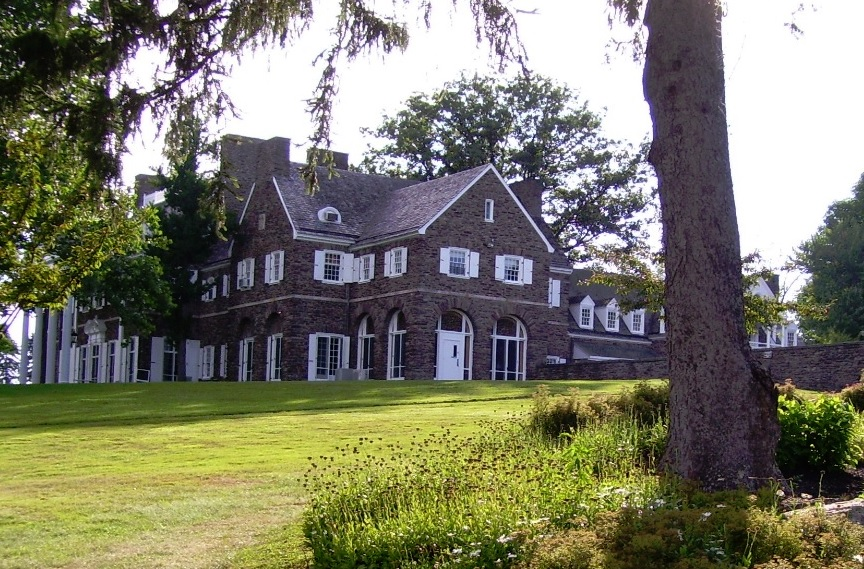
Penn State Wilkes-Barre in Lehman Township, Luzerne County

=== Public school districts ===
- Dallas School District
- Lake-Lehman School District

=== Colleges and universities ===
- Misericordia University in Dallas
- Penn State Wilkes-Barre in Lehman

=== Libraries ===
- Back Mountain Memorial Library

== Transportation ==
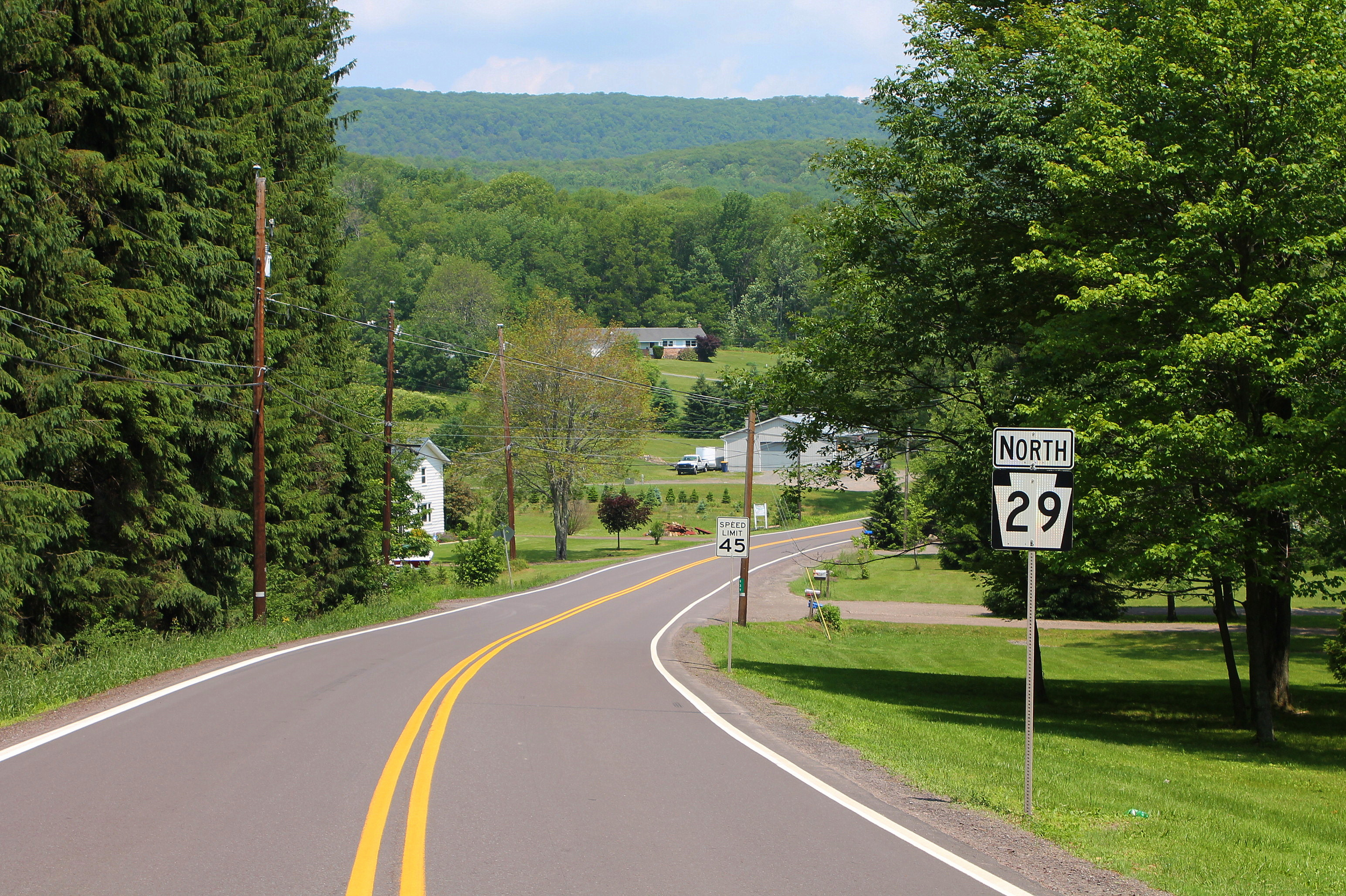
Pennsylvania Route 29 in Lake Township, Luzerne County

=== Highways ===
- PA 29
- PA 118
- PA 309
- PA 415

=== Nearby airports ===
- Wilkes-Barre/Scranton International Airport
- Wilkes-Barre Wyoming Valley Airport

== Notable people ==
- Lisa Baker, State Senator from Pennsylvania
- Fletcher C. Booker Jr., US Army major general
- Rob Bresnahan, U.S. Congressman
- Raye Hollitt, an American actress, female bodybuilder, and one of the original cast members of American Gladiators
- Mitchell Jenkins, a former Republican U.S. Congressman from Pennsylvania; he lived in Shavertown toward the end of his life
- Greg Manusky, NFL football player and coach.
- Francis T. McAndrew, Social Psychologist, Professor, & Author
- Jay McCarroll, the winning designer of Season 1 of Project Runway; he grew up in Lehman and attended Lake Lehman High School
- Connor McGovern (American football, born 1997), NFL Offensive Lineman
- Dan Meuser, U.S. Representative
- Paige Selenski, field hockey player for the US Olympic Team
- Greg Skrepenak, former NFL player, Luzerne County Commissioner, and convicted felon
- Randy Stair, Eaton Township Weis Market Shooter
- Stacey Williams, Fashion Model
- T. Newell Wood, Pennsylvania State Senator

== Gallery ==
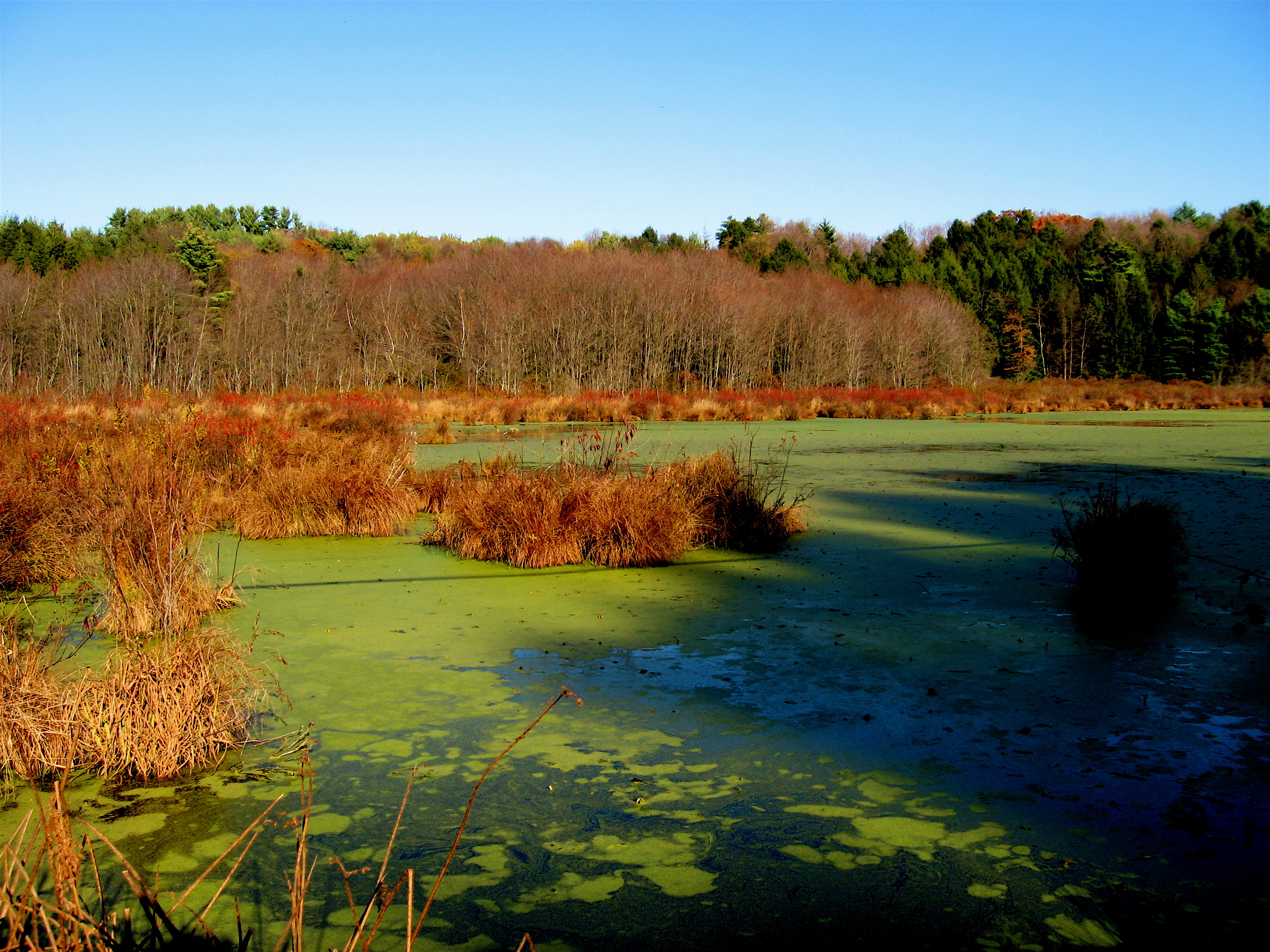
Swampland in Frances Slocum State Park

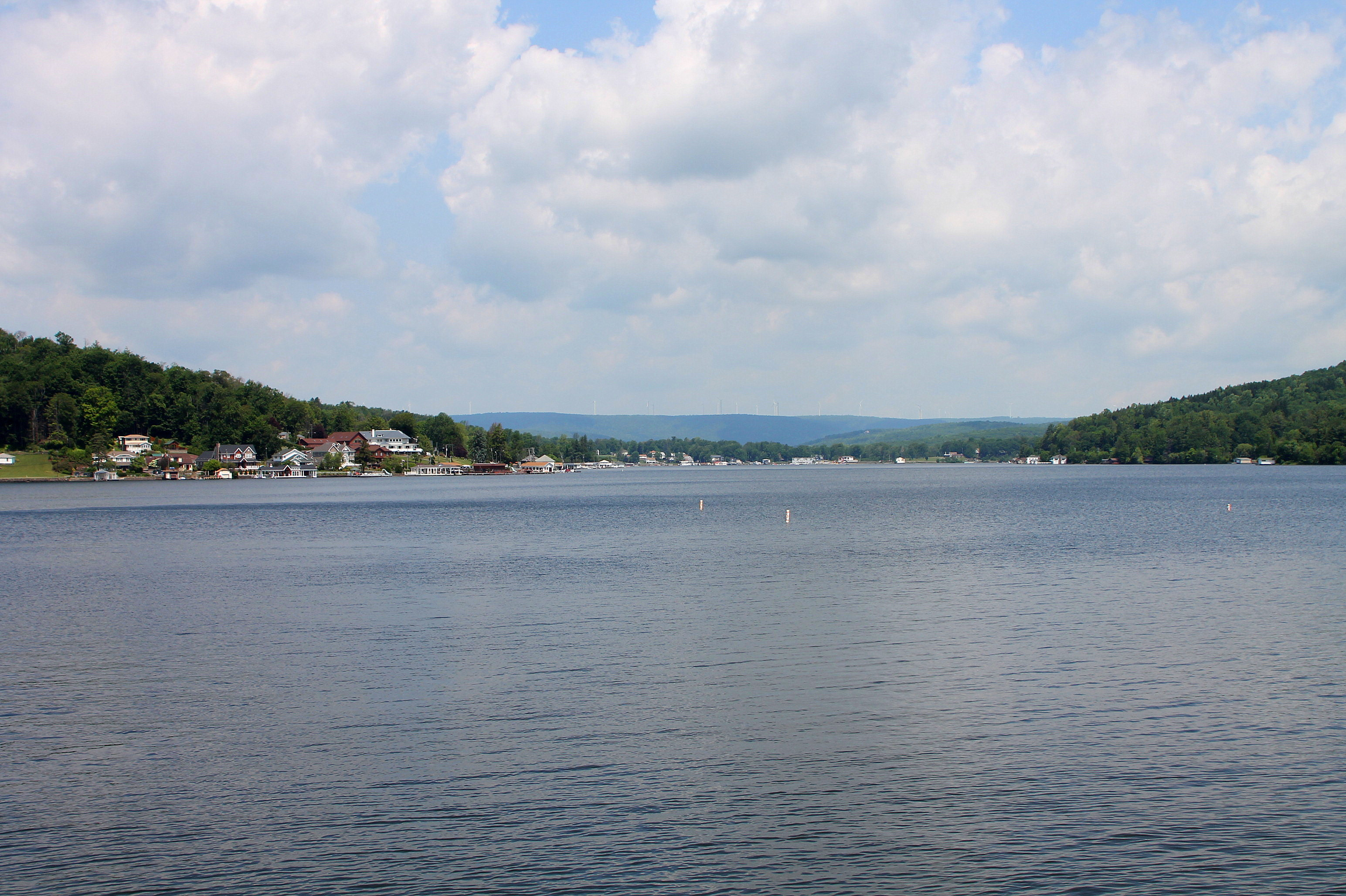
Harveys Lake

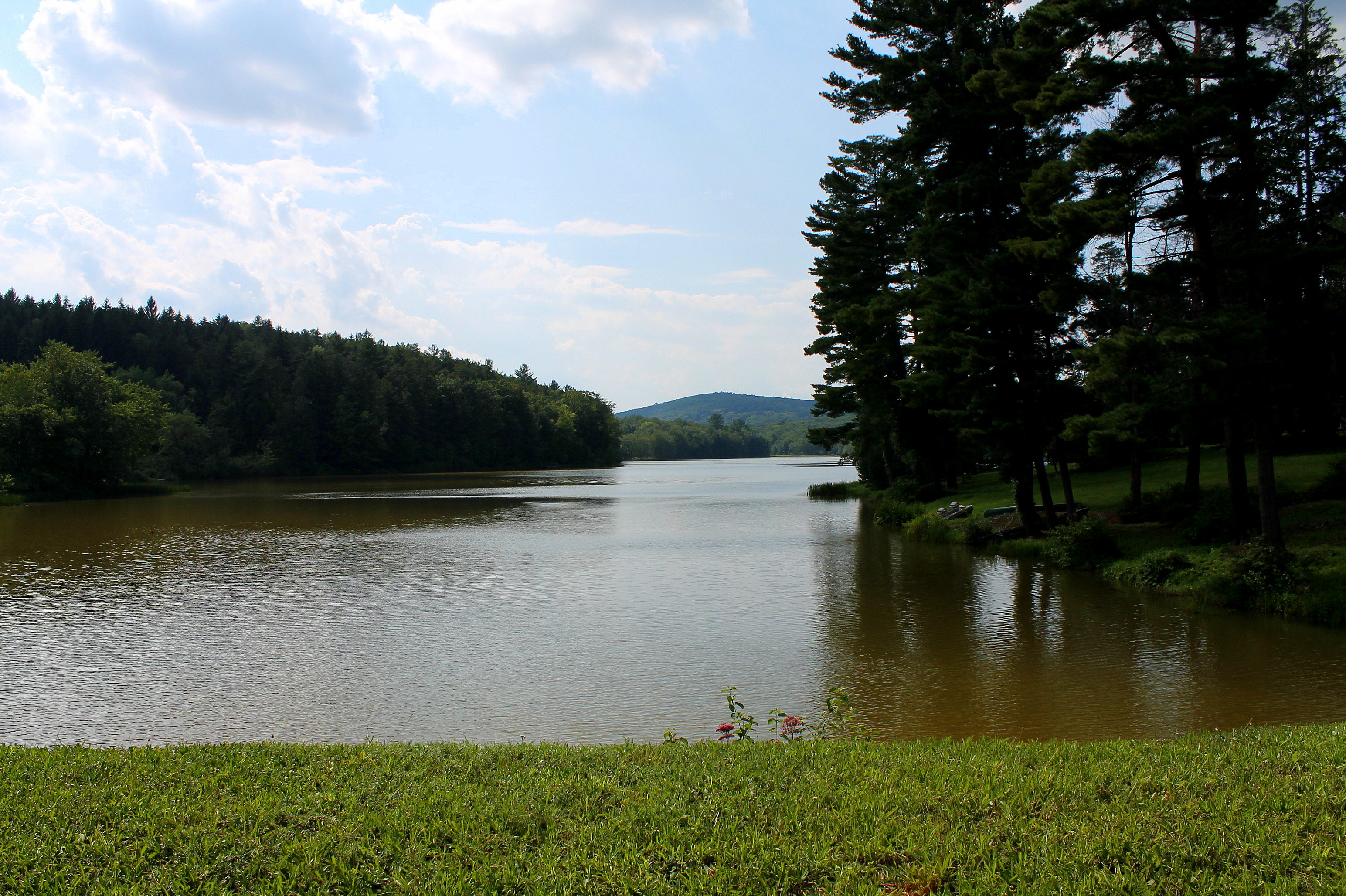
Lake Louise

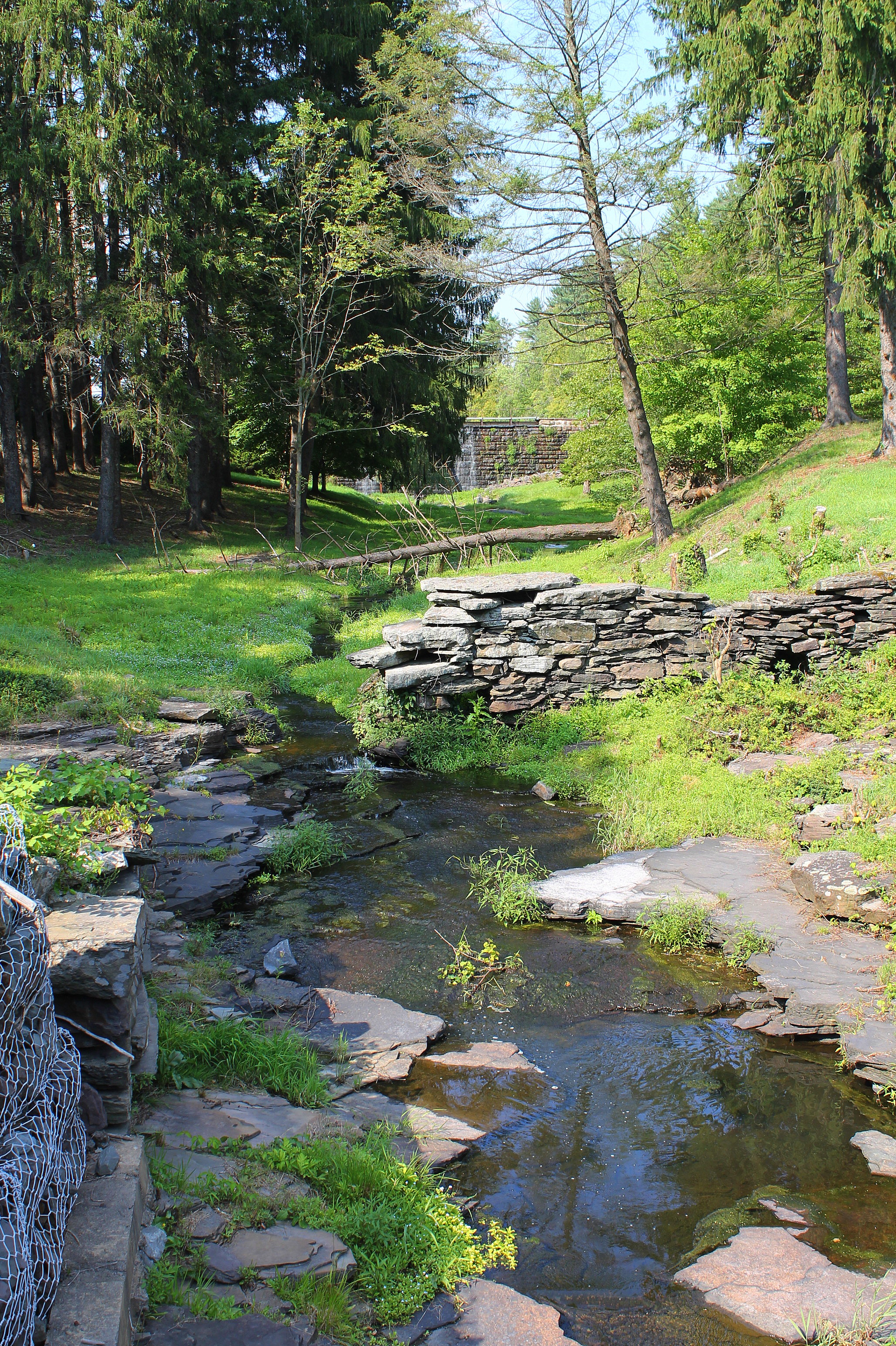
Huntsville Creek

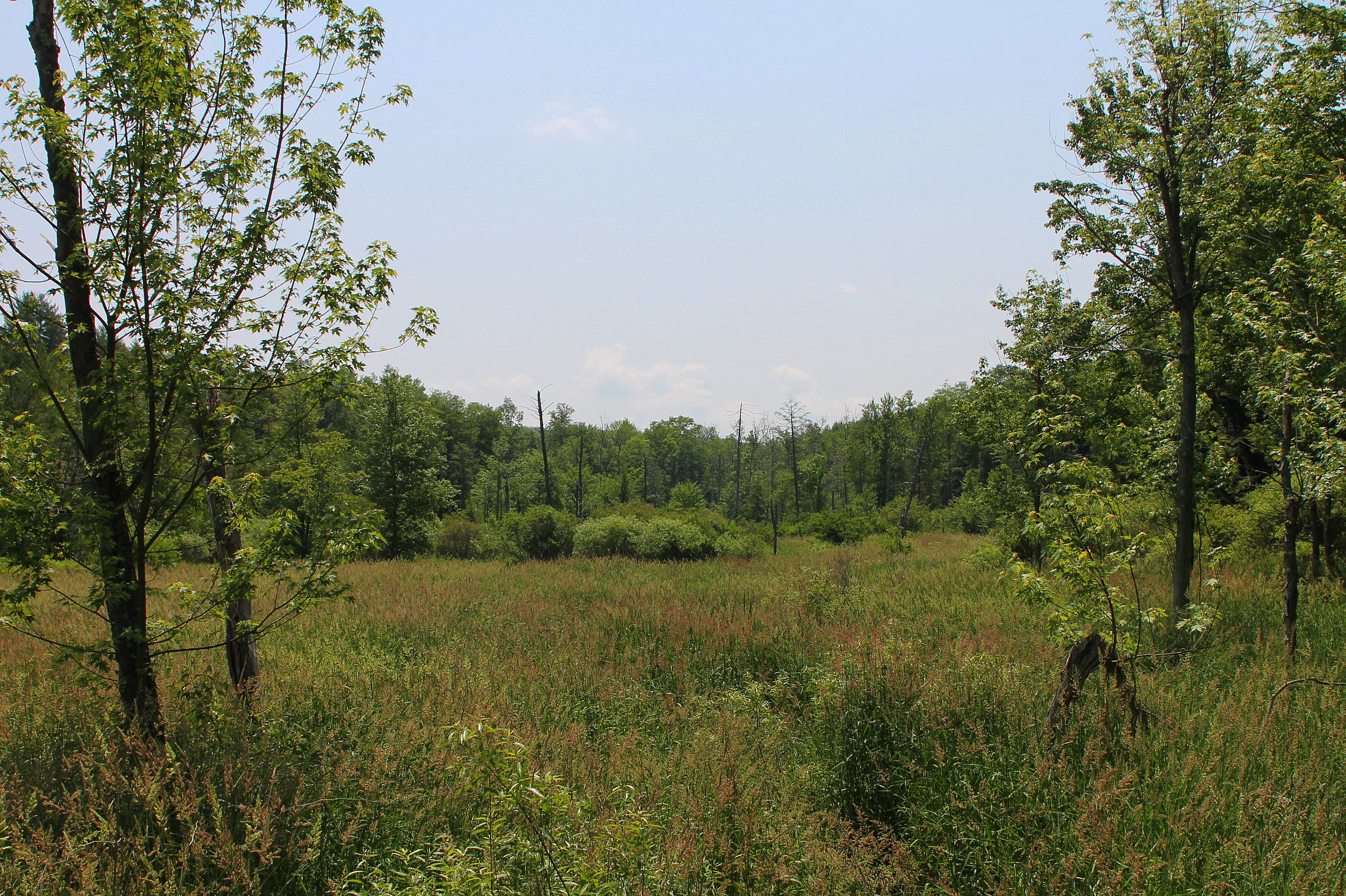
Undeveloped land in Lake Township

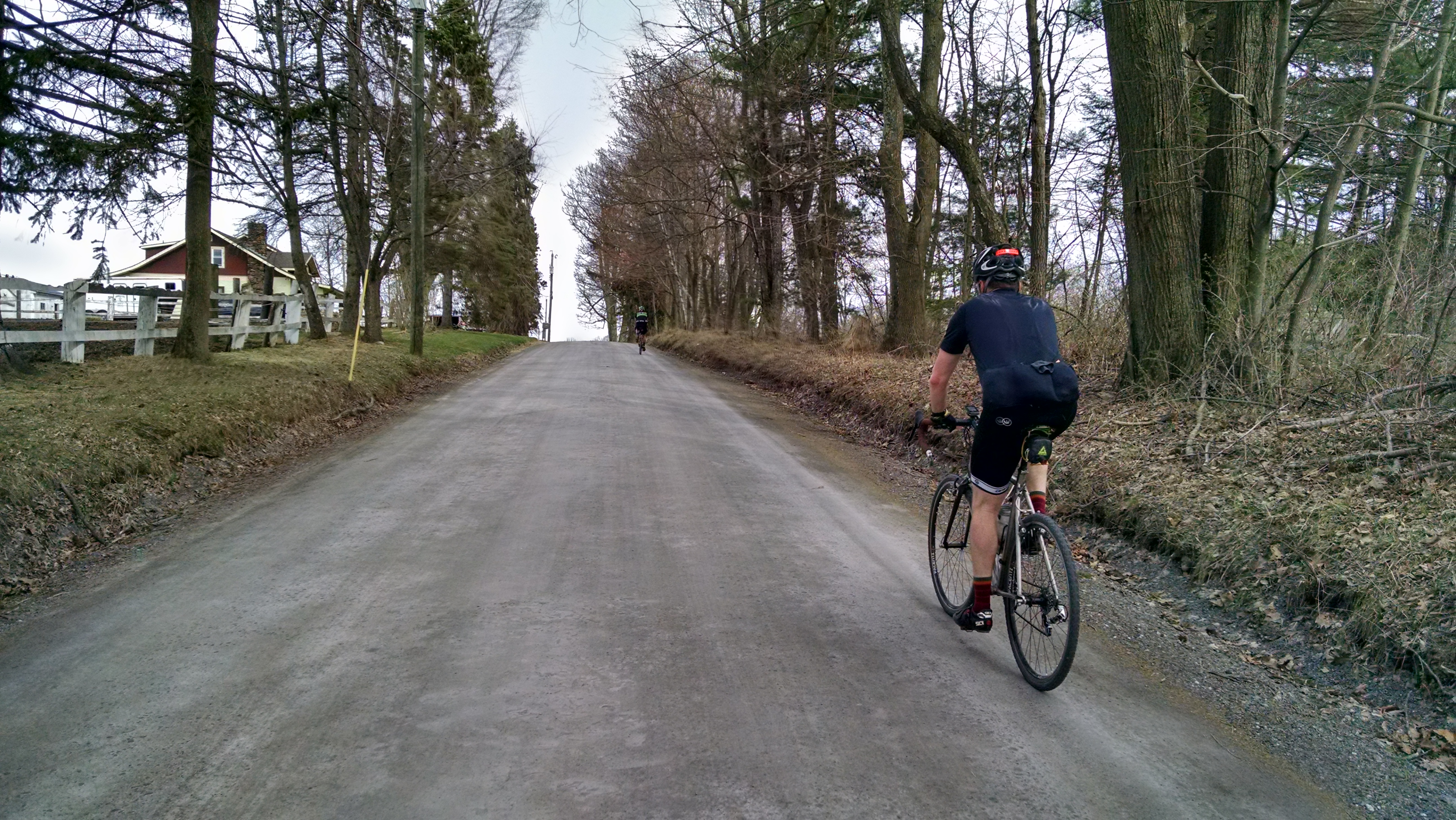
A bicyclist in Dallas Township
