= Shavertown, Pennsylvania =

Unincorporated community in Pennsylvania, US

- Census-designated place
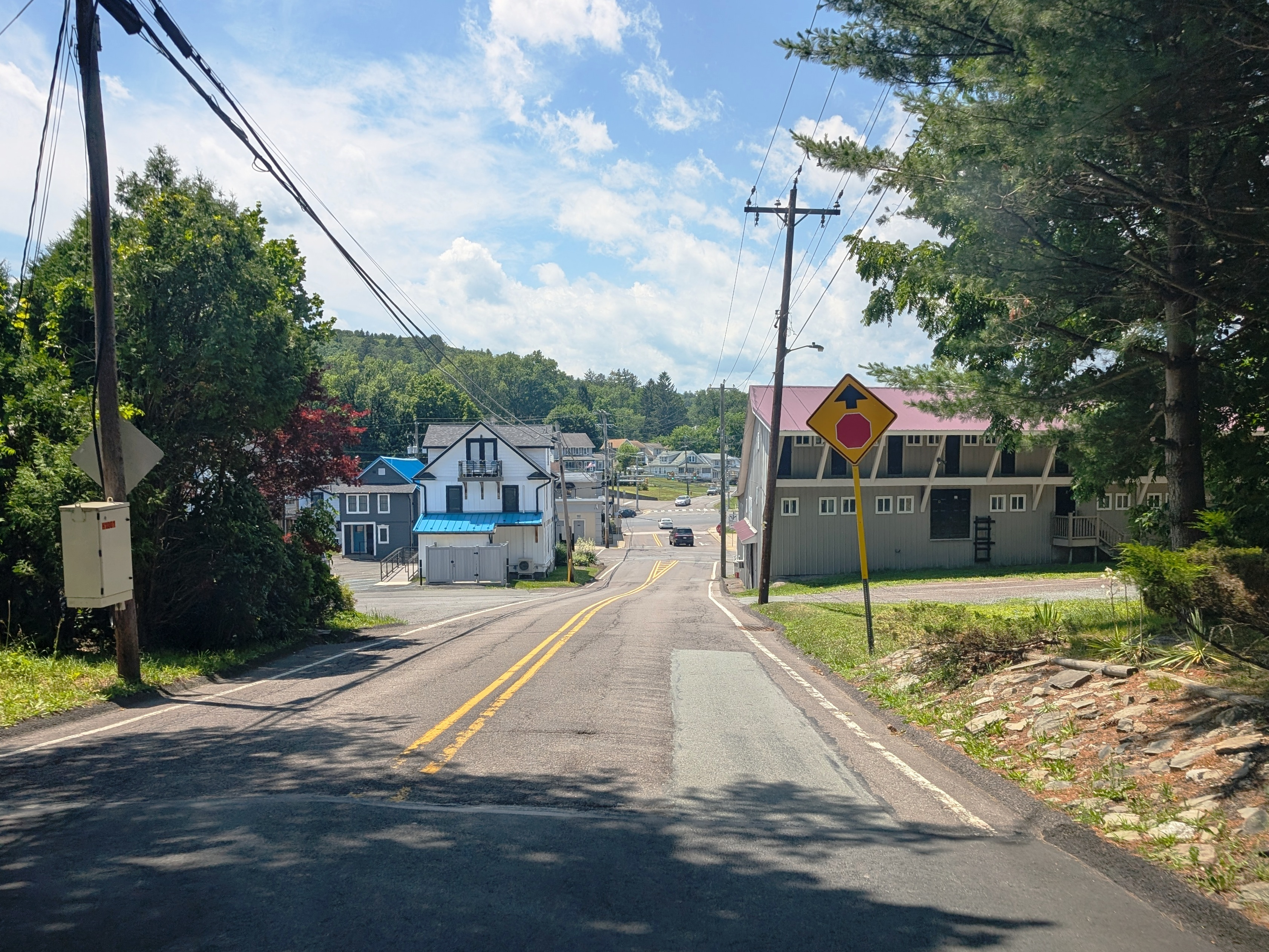
- Along East Center Street

- Location in Pennsylvania Location in the United States
- Coordinates: 41°19′11″N 75°56′16″W
- Country: United States
- State: Pennsylvania
- County: Luzerne
- Township: Kingston

Area
  - Total: 1.2 sq mi (3.2 km^{2})
  - Land: 1.2 sq mi (3.2 km^{2})
  - Water: 0 sq mi (0 km^{2})

Population (2020)
  - Total: 1,968
  - Density: 1,600/sq mi (620/km^{2})
- Time zone: UTC-5 (Eastern (EST))
  - Summer (DST): UTC-4 (EDT)
- ZIP code: 18708
- Area code: 570

Shavertown is a census-designated place (CDP) in Kingston Township, Luzerne County, Pennsylvania, United States. It lies approximately 7 miles (11 km) northwest of the city of Wilkes-Barre and 24 miles (39 km) southwest of Scranton. The population of the CDP was 1,968 at the 2020 census.

== History ==
=== Early history ===
Shavertown is named for an early settler, Philip Shaver. In 1813, Philip purchased the land that would later become Shavertown from William Trucks, the namesake of Trucksville. That same year, Philip sold the northwest portion of his land to John McClellon. This land would be known as McClellonsville, a small village which was later named Dallas. By 1818, Philip still owned nearly one thousand acres of land in the Back Mountain region.

Philip Shaver was born in 1762 along the Danube River Valley in Vienna, Austria. He migrated to the United States between 1765 and 1769 with his parents and brothers. Philip Shaver married Mary Ann Wickizer at St. James Lutheran Church (in Greenwich, Warren County, New Jersey, on December 12, 1786). They had 7 children: John Philip, Peter, William G., Elizabeth, James Henry, George, and Asa W. Shaver. Around 1804, Philip and his family arrived in Forty Fort, where they resided until 1810. Philip came to the “Back of the Mountain” in search of a gigantic species of legendary evergreen trees. He was forced to carve out a path from a rugged foot trail and among heavily forested lands, now Route 309, known to locals as the "Rock Cut." Philip and his sons constructed a sawmill in 1815. This first mill was on the north branch of Toby Creek and located near the Prince of Peace Church on Main Street in Dallas. Philip cut the wood for the first Market Street Bridge in Wilkes-Barre (in 1820).

It is said that after years of watching children labor on farms, Philip wished that the farm girls and boys should learn to read and write. In 1816, he donated the land for the first school in the Back Mountain. The school was a one-room log cabin on the site of the current Back Mountain Memorial Library on Huntsville Road. Philip also set aside lands for a public burying ground “on the hill near the pine grove just south of Dallas Village, on the road to Huntsville.” Philip also designated a plot of land for his family's graves, visible from Overbrook Road. In November 1826, Philip died after an accident. His left hand was crushed in the cider press that he and his sons were operating. Philip was forced to amputate his own hand and died of blood poisoning a few days later on November 7, 1826. A relative, Bayard Taylor Shaver of Lake Minnetonka, Minnesota, told of finding that same cider press on a visit to the Shaver farm in 1876. Philip's headstone rests at the end of the Shaver Cemetery. Inscribed upon his footstone reads a testament to Philip's vast travels: “Here lies my weary feet.”

Academy Award nominated actor Lee Tracy is buried in Shavertown.

=== Vice-presidential visit ===
Shavertown came to national attention in October 2005 when U.S. Vice President Dick Cheney visited the village at the home of Ron and Rhea Simms for a fundraiser for the reelection campaign of Pennsylvania Republican U.S. Senator Rick Santorum, who was later defeated in the 2006 U.S. congressional elections by Scranton native and pro-life Democrat Bob Casey, Jr., the state's former treasurer. The fundraiser raised $300,000 for the Santorum campaign.

== Geography ==
Shavertown is located in the western corner of Kingston Township at 41°19′11″N 75°56′16″W, along Pennsylvania Route 309. It is directly north of the CDP of Trucksville and directly south of the unincorporated area of Fern Brook (in the neighboring Dallas Township). The borough of Dallas is 1 mile (2 km) north along Route 309.

According to the United States Census Bureau, the CDP has a total area of 1.2 square miles (3.2 km^{2}), all land.

== Education ==
The school district is the Dallas School District.
