= Dallas High School (Dallas, Pennsylvania) =

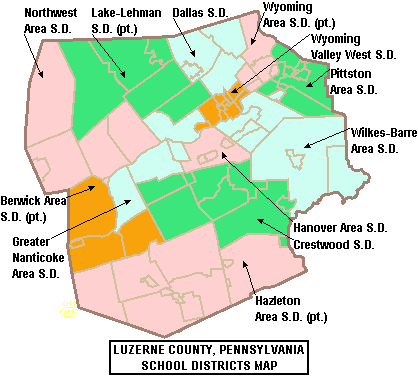
- Map of school districts in Luzerne County, Pennsylvania

Location
- 2000 Conyngham Avenue; Dallas, Luzerne County, Pennsylvania 18612; United States; 41°20′27″N 75°57′05″W

Information
- Type: Public
- Established: 1961
- School district: Dallas School District
- Principal: Greg Riley (2019)
- Faculty: 58 teachers (2015)
- Teaching staff: 54.50 (FTE)
- Grades: 9 to 12
- Enrollment: 765 (2023–2024)
- Student to teacher ratio: 14.04
- Colors: Blue and White
- Athletics conference: PIAA District 2 Wyoming Valley Conference
- Nickname: Mountaineers
- Website: Official website

Dallas High School is a public high school located in Dallas, Pennsylvania, United States. In 2016, enrollment was reported as 888 pupils in 9th through 12th grades. The school employed 58 teachers. Dallas High School is the sole high school operated by the Dallas School District.

Dallas High School students may choose to attend the West Side Area Vocational Technical School for training in the construction and mechanical trades. The Luzerne Intermediate Unit IU18 provides Dallas High School with a wide variety of services like: specialized education for disabled students; state mandated training on recognizing and reporting child abuse; speech and visual disability services; criminal background check processing for prospective employees and professional development for staff and faculty.

== Extracurriculars ==
The Dallas School District offers a wide variety of clubs, activities and an extensive, publicly funded sports program.

=== Athletics ===
The district funds:

Varsity

Boys

- Baseball - AAAA
- Basketball- AAAAA
- Cross country - AA
- Football - AAAA
- Golf - AAA
- Indoor track and field - AAAA
- Lacrosse - AA
- Soccer - AAA
- Swimming and diving - AAA
- Tennis - AA
- Track and field - AAA
- Volleyball - AA
- Wrestling - AAA

Girls

- Basketball - AAAA
- Cheerleading - AAAAA
- Cross country - AA
- Field hockey - AA
- Golf - AA
- Lacrosse - AA
- Soccer (Fall) - AAA
- Softball - AAAA
- Swimming and diving - AA
- Tennis - AA
- Track and field - AAA
- Volleyball - AAA

According to PIAA directory July 2016

Dallas High School has won PIAA State Championships in football (1993), girls' cross country (2003, 2005, 2014), boys cross country (2015, 2016), girls' soccer (2007), and men's diving (2005, 2006).

== Notable alumni ==
- Greg Manusky, former American football player and current defensive coordinator for the Indianapolis Colts of the National Football League
- Lisa Baker, Pennsylvania State Senator (R-Luzerne).
