= Frances Slocum State Park =

State park in Pennsylvania, United States

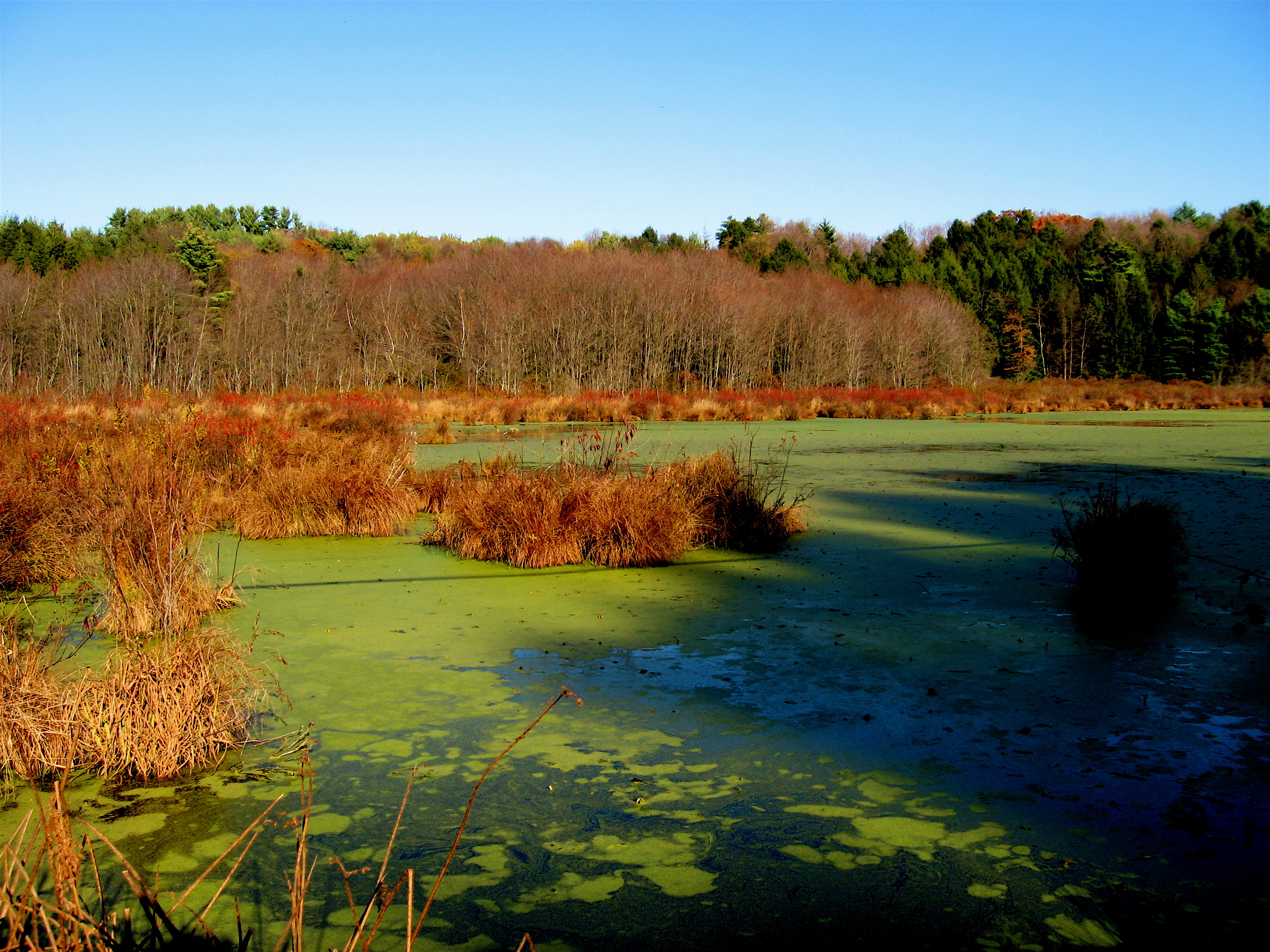
- Swampland in the park in autumn

- Location within Pennsylvania Location within the United States
- Interactive map of Frances Slocum State Park
- Location: Luzerne County, Pennsylvania, United States
- Coordinates: 41°20′40″N 75°53′31″W
- Area: 1,035 acres (419 ha)
- Elevation: 1,148 feet (350 m)
- Established: 1968
- Administrator: Pennsylvania Department of Conservation and Natural Resources
- Website: Official website
- Pennsylvania State Parks

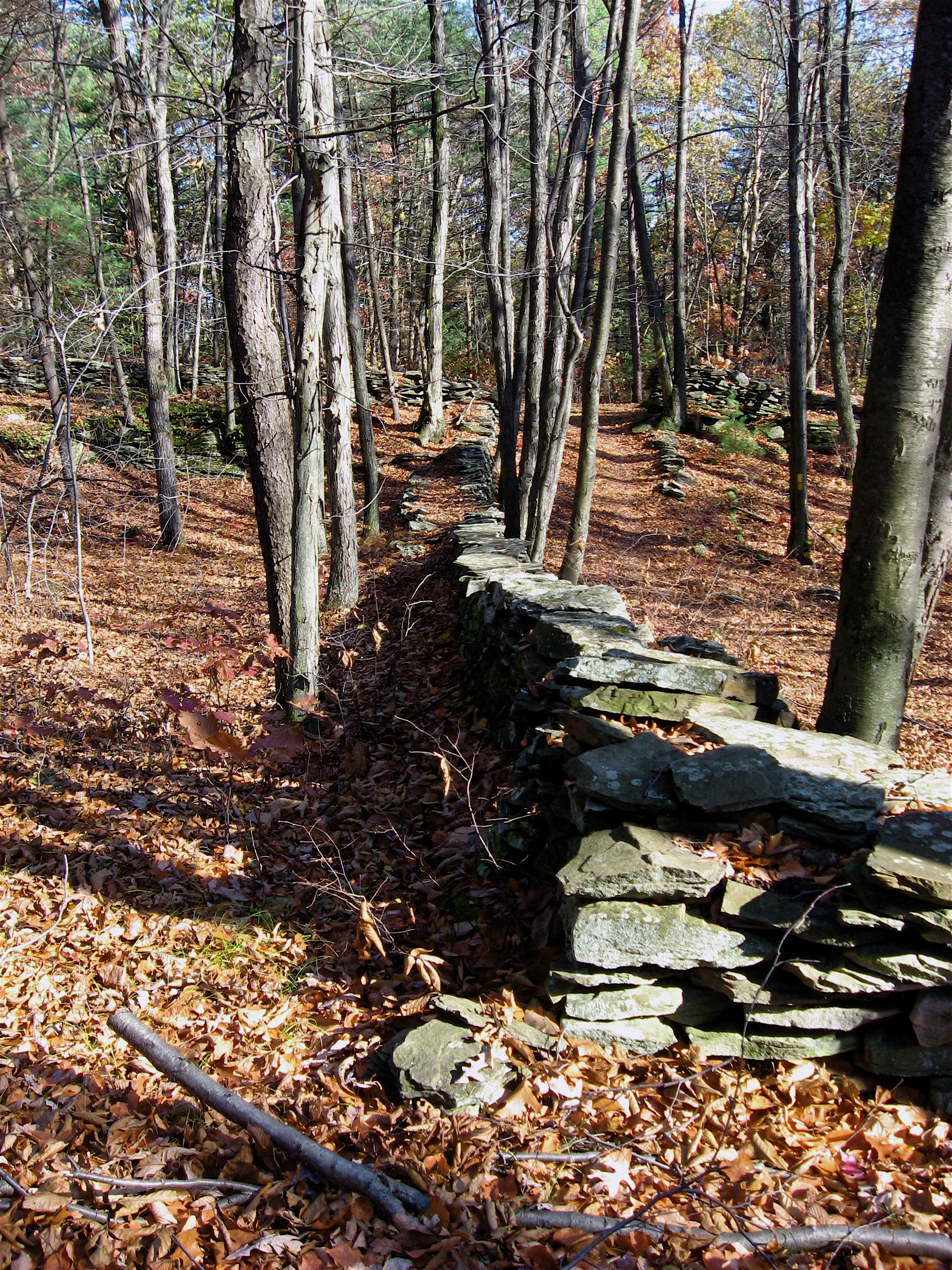
Woodland in Frances Slocum State Park

Frances Slocum State Park is a 1,035-acre (419 ha) Pennsylvania state park in Kingston Township, Luzerne County, Pennsylvania, in the United States. Frances Slocum Lake is a 165-acre (67 ha) man-made, horseshoe-shaped lake that is a popular fishing and boating destination. The park is 5 miles (8.0 km) from Dallas and 10 miles (16 km) from Wilkes-Barre.

== Namesake ==
The park is named for Frances Slocum, who was taken captive by a group of Lenape on November 2, 1778, when she was just five years old. Her family had been among the first whites to settle in the Wyoming Valley of Pennsylvania. It is believed that she escaped captivity that first night; she was soon recaptured. Frances was held for the night under a rock ledge along Abraham Creek in what is now part of the state park. She spent the rest of her life with the Native Americans. Her brothers found her 59 years later living on an Indian Reservation near Peru, Indiana. Despite the pleadings of her brothers, Frances refused to leave her family. She had been married twice and was the mother of four children. Frances, now called "Mocanaquah" (meaning "Young Bear"), lived for the rest of her life in Indiana. She died in 1847 at the age of 74. Her name lives on in Indiana, where the Frances Slocum State Recreational Area and Lost Sister Trail (in the Mississinewa Reservoir and State Forest) are named in her honor. Her final resting place is marked with a monument along the banks of the Mississinewa River in Indiana.

== History ==
Frances Slocum Lake was built to help control flooding in the North Branch Susquehanna River basin in 1968. Frances Slocum State Park was built around the dam and lake. The park became home to 280 families that were displaced by the flood created by Hurricane Agnes in 1972. The park was closed to the public and was not reopened until 1974 (when all the families had moved out of their temporary homes).

== Recreation ==
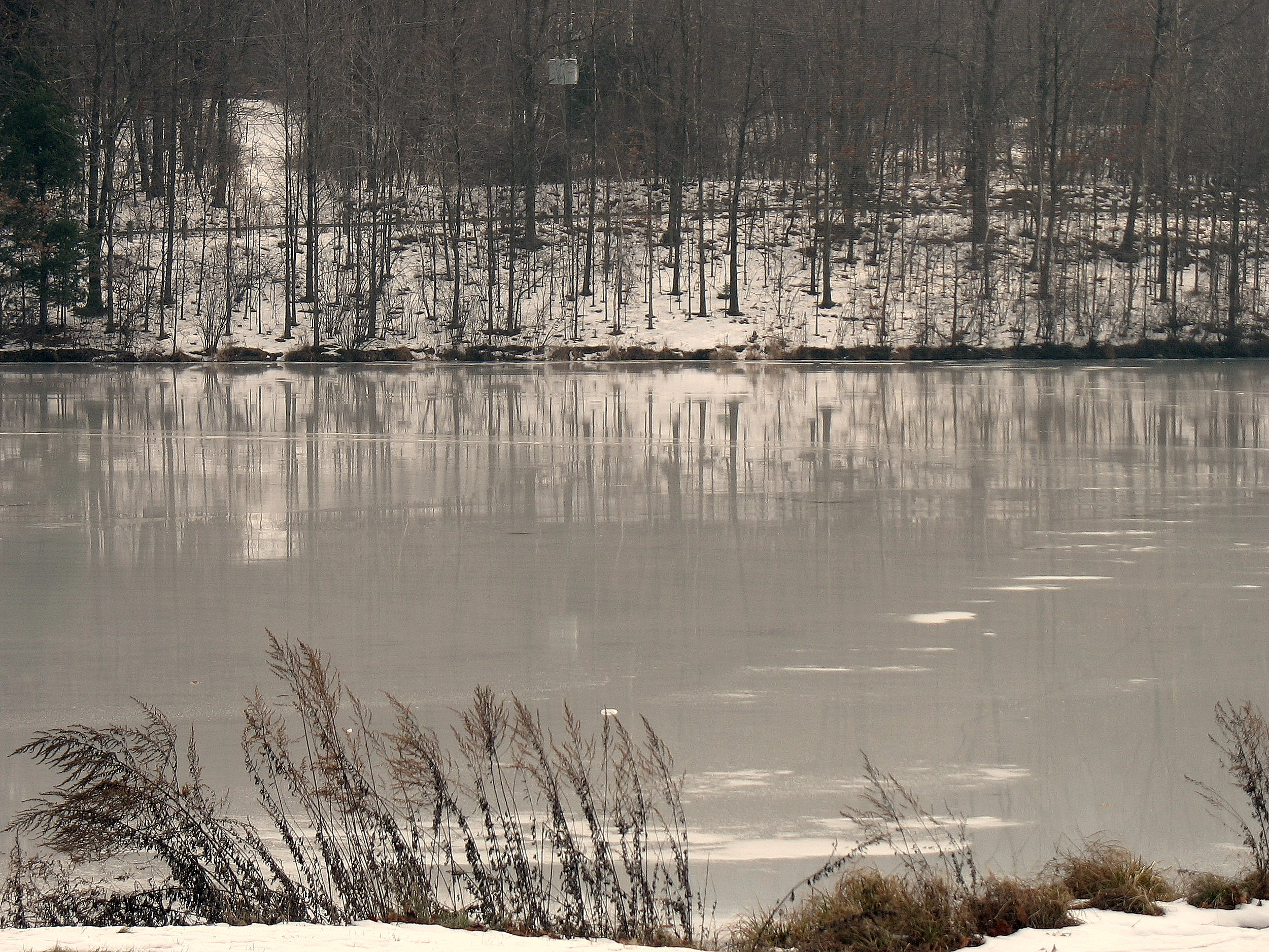
A frozen Frances Slocum Lake

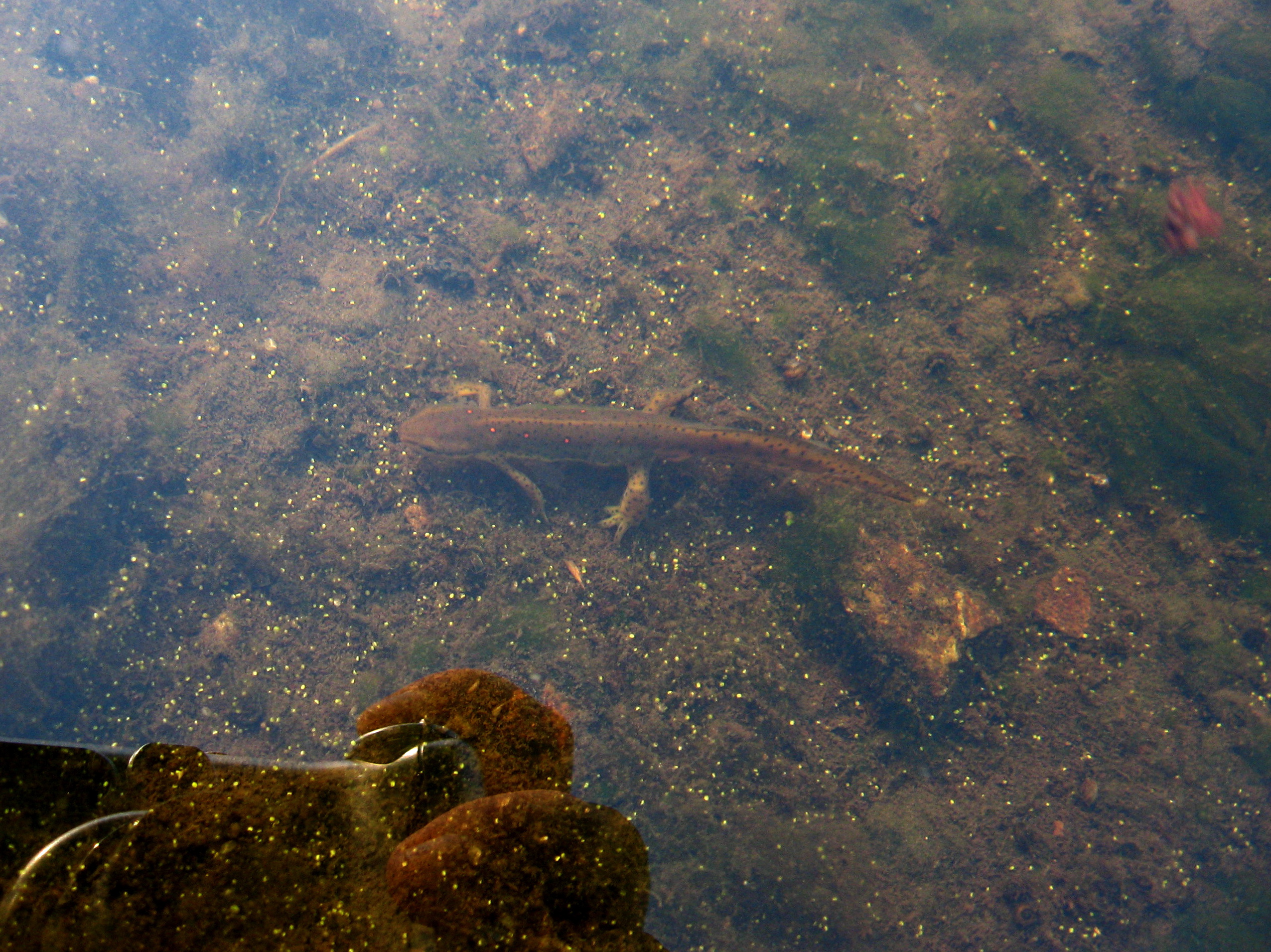
Salamanders are a common sight along Lakeshore Trail

=== Hunting and fishing ===
About 700 acres (280 ha) of Frances Slocum State Park are open to hunting. Hunters are expected to follow the rules and regulations of the Pennsylvania Game Commission. The common game species are squirrels, rabbits and white-tailed deer. The hunting of groundhogs is prohibited.

Frances Slocum Lake is a warm-water fishery. Fisherman can catch crappie, bluegill, walleye, muskellunge, pickerel, and smallmouth and largemouth bass from the shore, fishing pier and from electric or non-powered boats. Gasoline-powered boats are prohibited at Frances Slocum State Park.

=== Camping and picnicking ===
There are 100 campsites at Frances Slocum State Park. 15 are walk-in tent sites and 85 sites can accommodate tents or trailers. The larger sites have electric hook-ups. Each site has a fire ring and picnic table. There is a modern bathhouse with showers, flush toilets and drinking water. There is a large group tenting area that has a 40 tent capacity. It is within walking distance of the main camping area and its bathhouse.

The Park made some changes to its registration process in 2008 to accommodate a new camp store for campers. Previously, camper registration was performed at the Contact Station along the road to the campsites. That building is no longer used, and camper registration is performed at the Main Office near the entrance to the Park.

Frances Slocum State Park has several picnic areas. There are three pavilions available to rent. The picnic areas have tables, grills and charcoal disposal pits. They also have restrooms, drinking water, and garbage and recycling bins.

=== Swimming ===
The swimming pool is open daily from 11:00 A.M. to 7:00 P.M, from Memorial Day weekend to Labor Day, unless posted otherwise. A fee is charged for pool use. A seasonal snack bar has fast food and beverages. This activity or structure is ADA accessible.

=== Trails ===
Frances Slocum State Park has 9 miles (14 km) of hiking trails.

- Frances Slocum Trail is 0.7 miles (1.1 km) in length. It is marked with blue blazes. It begins and ends at the boat rental parking lot and passes the rock ledge where Frances Slocum was held for the first night of her captivity.
- Campground Trail is 1 mile (1.6 km) in length. It is marked with white blazes. It runs from the Stony Point parking lot to the group tenting area.
- Deer Trail is 3.8 miles (6.1 km) in length at its greatest. It is marked with yellow blazes. Deer Trail has three loops. It passes the lakeshore, a thicket, a hemlock stand, a marsh and mixed and hardwood forests. This trail is used by hunters during hunting season.
- Lakeshore Trail is 1.4 miles (2.3 km) in length. It is marked with red blazes and provides access to the lakeshore for hikers and fishermen.
- Larch Tree Trail is 2 miles (3.2 km) in length. It is marked with orange blazes. It loops through a stand of larch trees.

=== Winter activities ===
Frances Slocum State Park is open during the winter months for ice fishing, ice skating, sledding, tobogganing, and snowmobiling.
