= Trucksville, Pennsylvania =

Unincorporated community in Pennsylvania, US

- Census-designated place
- Location in Pennsylvania Location in the United States
- Coordinates: 41°18′14″N 75°55′55″W
- Country: United States
- State: Pennsylvania
- County: Luzerne
- Township: Kingston

Area
  - Total: 1.7 sq mi (4.5 km^{2})
  - Land: 1.7 sq mi (4.5 km^{2})
  - Water: 0 sq mi (0 km^{2})

Population (2010)
  - Total: 2,152
  - Density: 1,200/sq mi (480/km^{2})
- Time zone: UTC-5 (Eastern (EST))
  - Summer (DST): UTC-4 (EDT)
- ZIP code: 18708
- Area code: 570

Trucksville is a census-designated place (CDP) in Kingston Township, Luzerne County, Pennsylvania, United States. The population was 2,152 at the 2010 census.

== Geography ==
Trucksville is located at 41°18′14″N 75°55′55″W, along Pennsylvania Route 309 in the western part of Kingston Township. It is located directly south of the CDP of Shavertown and 3 miles (5 km) north of the borough of Kingston. Trucksville is served by the Shavertown post office, with the zip code of 18708.

According to the United States Census Bureau, the CDP has a total area of 1.7 square miles (4.5 km^{2}), all land.

The town has a volunteer fire department and a Methodist church, among other amenities. Trucksville is named for the town's founder, William Trucks (Trux), who operated a sawmill in the 19th century.

== Education ==
The school district is the Dallas School District.
