= Kingston Township, Pennsylvania =

Township in Pennsylvania, US

Coordinates: 41°21′00″N 75°52′28″W

- Township
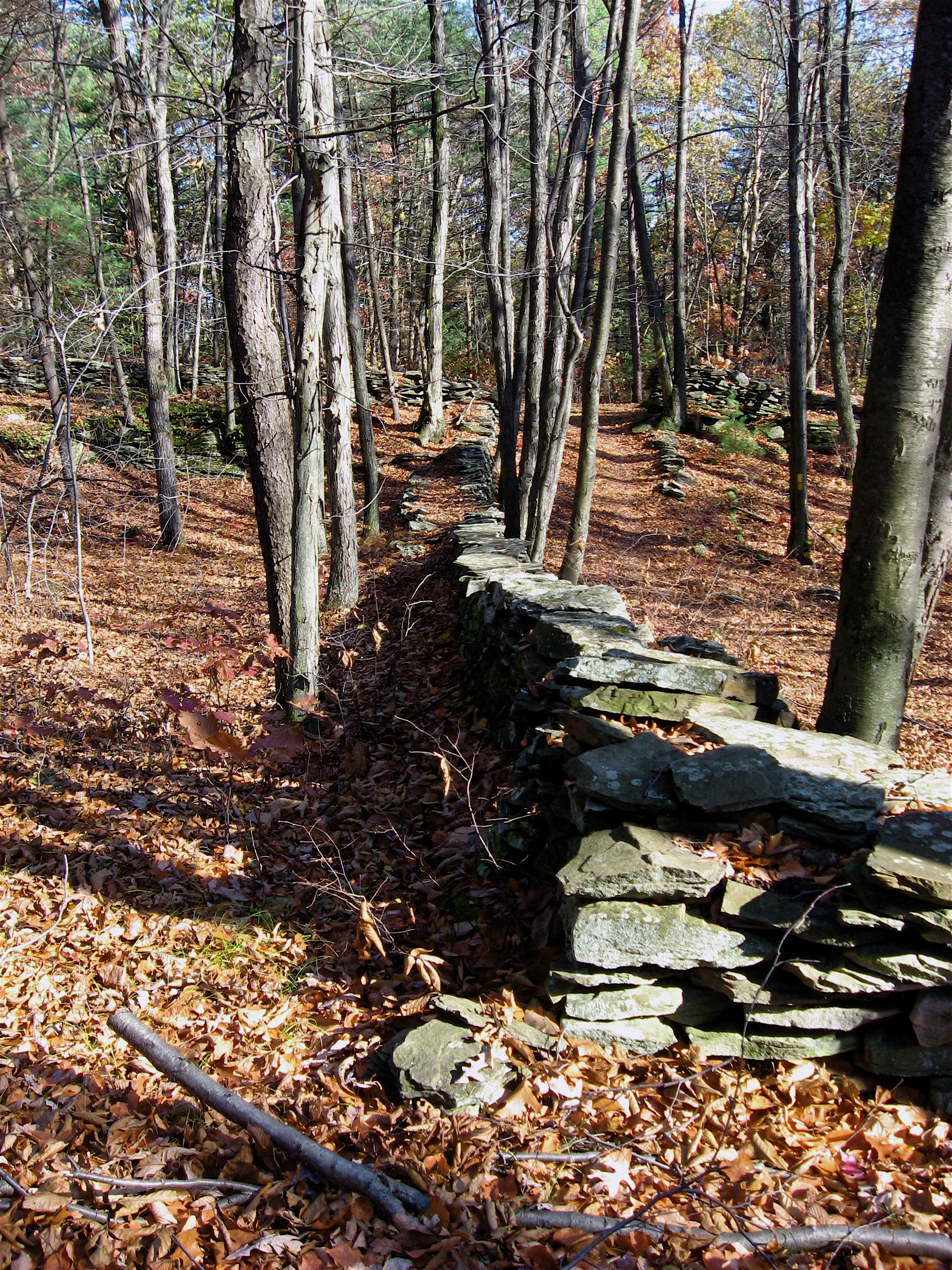
- Frances Slocum State Park

- Flag Seal Logo

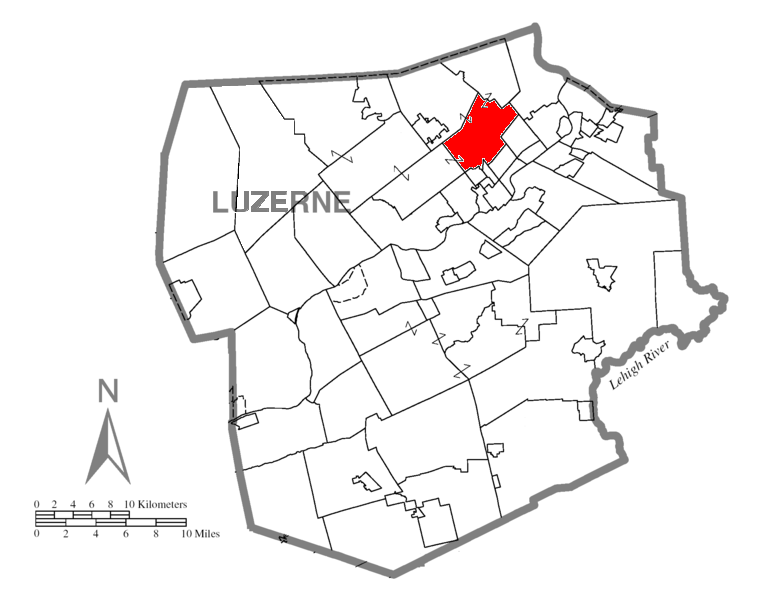
- Map of Luzerne County highlighting Kingston Township

- Map of Pennsylvania highlighting Luzerne County
- Country: United States
- State: Pennsylvania
- County: Luzerne

Area
  - Total: 13.92 sq mi (36.04 km^{2})
  - Land: 13.65 sq mi (35.36 km^{2})
  - Water: 0.26 sq mi (0.67 km^{2})

Population (2020)
  - Total: 7,096 ▲
  - Estimate (2021): 7,096
  - Density: 507.9/sq mi (196.11/km^{2})
- Time zone: UTC-5 (Eastern (EST))
  - Summer (DST): UTC-4 (EDT)
- FIPS code: 42-079-39792
- Website: kingstontownship.com

Kingston Township is a township in Luzerne County, Pennsylvania, United States. The population was 7,096 at the 2020 census. The villages of Trucksville and Shavertown are located within the township. It is home to Frances Slocum State Park. The township is described as "the gateway to the Back Mountain" (a 118 square mile region in northern Luzerne County). The area includes the townships of Dallas, Franklin, Jackson, Kingston, Lake, and Lehman. The region also includes the boroughs of Dallas and Harveys Lake.

== History ==
An old map of Kingston Township

=== Establishment ===
Kingston Township was one of the original townships formed by the Susquehanna Land Company of Connecticut in 1790. The township is named after Kingston, Rhode Island, and was originally called “Kingstown.” The township was later downsized when whole regions were stripped away to form new municipalities (i.e., townships and boroughs).

=== Shavertown and Trucksville ===
Shavertown is named for an early settler — Philip Shaver. In 1813, Philip purchased the land that would later become Shavertown from William Trucks, the namesake of Trucksville. That same year, Philip sold the northwest portion of his land to John McClellon. This land would be known as McClellonsville, a small village which was later named Dallas. By 1818, Philip still owned nearly one thousand acres of land in the Back Mountain region.

Philip Shaver was born in 1762 along the Danube River Valley in Vienna, Austria. He migrated to the United States between 1765 and 1769 with his parents and brothers. Philip Shaver married Mary Ann Wickizer at St. James Lutheran Church (in Greenwich, Warren County, New Jersey, on December 12, 1786). They had 7 children: John Philip, Peter, William G., Elizabeth, James Henry, George, and Asa W. Shaver. Around 1804, Philip and his family arrived in Forty Fort, where they resided until 1810. Philip came to the “Back of the Mountain” in search of a gigantic species of legendary evergreen trees. He was forced to carve out a path from a rugged foot trail and among heavily forested lands, now PA 309. Philip and his sons constructed a sawmill in 1815. This first mill was on the north branch of Toby Creek and located near the Prince of Peace Church on Main Street in Dallas.

In 1816, he donated a piece of land for the first school in the Back Mountain. The school was a one-room log cabin on the site of the current Back Mountain Memorial Library on Huntsville Road. Philip also set aside land for a public burying ground “on the hill near the pine grove just south of Dallas Village (on the road to Huntsville).” Philip also designated a plot of land for his family's graves, visible from Overbrook Road. In 1826, Philip died after an accident. His left hand was crushed in the cider press that he and his sons were operating in November 1826. Philip was forced to amputate his own hand and died of blood poisoning a few days later on November 7, 1826.

=== Frances Slocum ===
Frances Slocum State Park is located in Kingston Township. In 1968, the lake, which is the centerpiece of the park, was built to control flooding in the North Branch Susquehanna River. In 1972, the park became a temporary home to 280 families who were displaced by the Agnes flood. The park was closed to the public; it was not reopened until 1974, when all the families were relocated.

== Geography ==
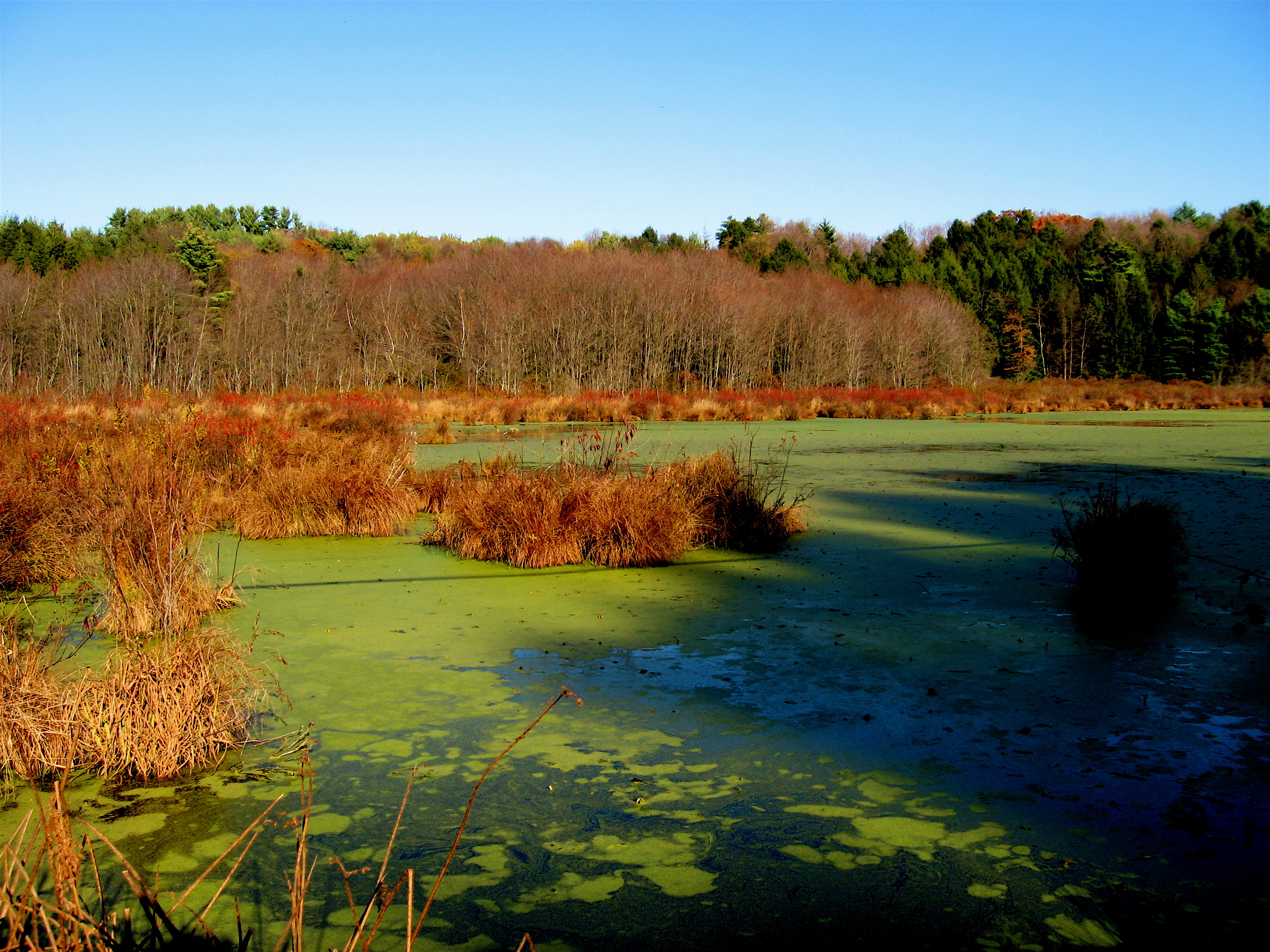
Swampland in Frances Slocum State Park

According to the United States Census Bureau, the township has a total area of 13.9 square miles (36.0 km^{2}), of which 13.7 square miles (35.4 km^{2}) is land and 0.27 square miles (0.7 km^{2}), or 1.87%, is water.

Kingston Township is densely populated in the southwestern section of the municipality; this is where the villages of Shavertown and Trucksville are located. PA 309 also travels through this portion of the township.

Kingston Township is known as "the gateway to the Back Mountain," because two major roadways — PA 309 and West Eighth Street (in the northeastern section of the municipality) — link the Back Mountain (Kingston Township) to the Anthracite Valley (also known as the Wyoming Valley). Frances Slocum State Park is located in the northeastern portion of the township. Carverton Road runs through the center of Kingston Township and links PA 309 to West Eighth Street. Farms and forests are located in the northern and southern sections of the municipality.

Kingston Township is part of Dallas School District (which encompasses approximately 46 square miles).

== Demographics ==
Historical population
Census	Pop.	Note	%±
2000	7,145		—
2010	6,999		−2.0%
2020	7,096		1.4%
2021 (est.)	7,096		0.0%
U.S. Decennial Census

As of the census of 2000, there were 7,145 people, 2,745 households, and 2,083 families residing in the township. The population density was 526.2 inhabitants per square mile (203.2/km^{2}). There were 2,923 housing units at an average density of 215.3 per square mile (83.1/km^{2}). The racial makeup of the township was 98.95% White, 0.24% African American, 0.06% Native American, 0.28% Asian, 0.08% from other races, and 0.39% from two or more races. Hispanic or Latino people of any race were 0.38% of the population.

There were 2,745 households, out of which 35.0% had children under the age of 18 living with them, 64.7% were married couples living together, 8.6% had a female householder with no husband present, and 24.1% were non-families. 20.6% of all households were made up of individuals, and 8.9% had someone living alone who was 65 years of age or older. The average household size was 2.60 and the average family size was 3.02.

In the township the population was spread out, with 24.9% under the age of 18, 6.4% from 18 to 24, 28.9% from 25 to 44, 27.1% from 45 to 64, and 12.8% who were 65 years of age or older. The median age was 40 years. For every 100 females, there were 96.9 males. For every 100 females age 18 and over, there were 92.2 males.

The median income for a household in the township was $52,997, and the median income for a family was $62,435. Males had a median income of $40,872 versus $30,075 for females. The per capita income for the township was $23,885. About 4.2% of families and 4.8% of the population were below the poverty line, including 6.2% of those under age 18 and 3.6% of those age 65 or over.

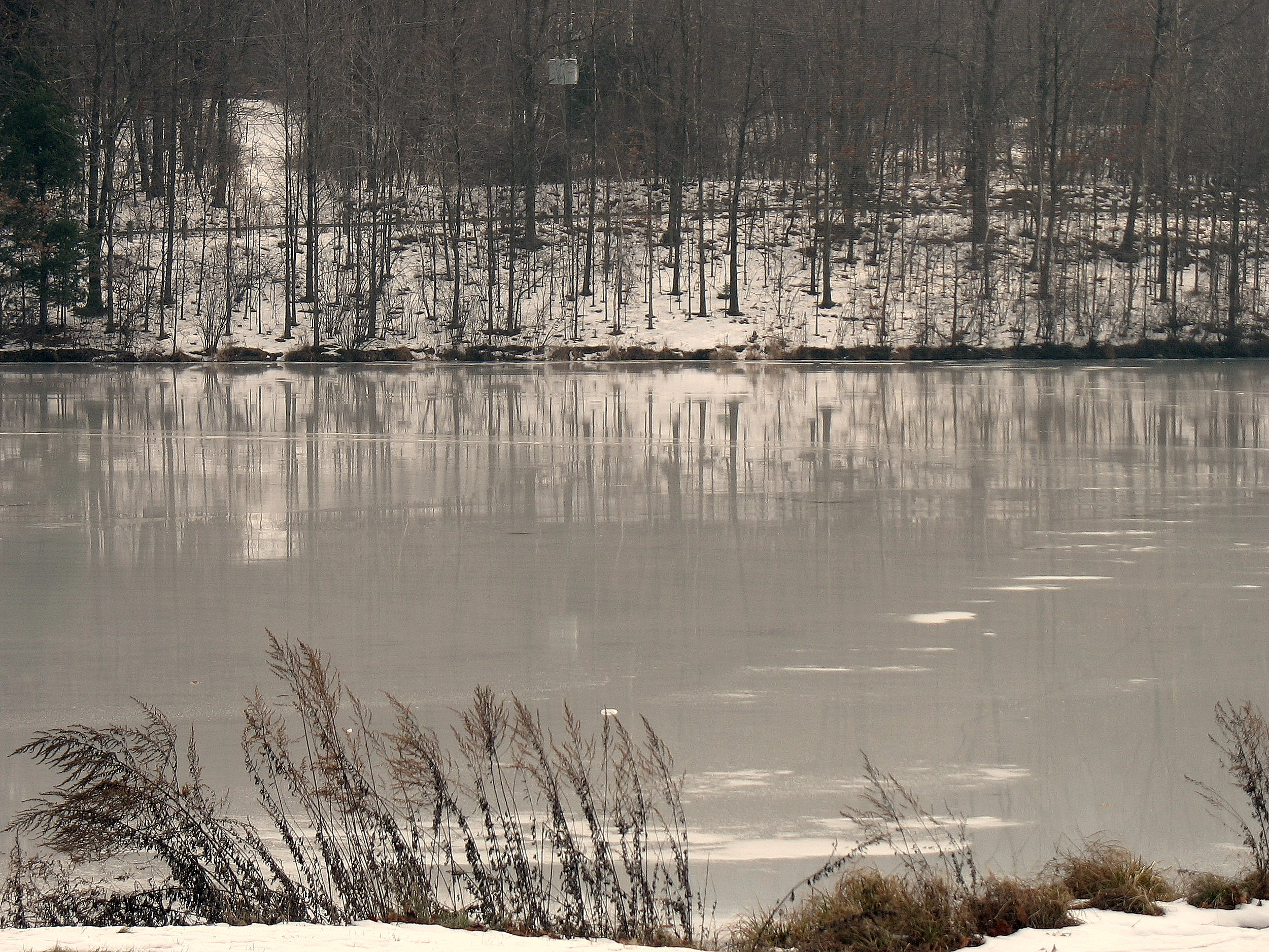
A frozen Frances Slocum Lake

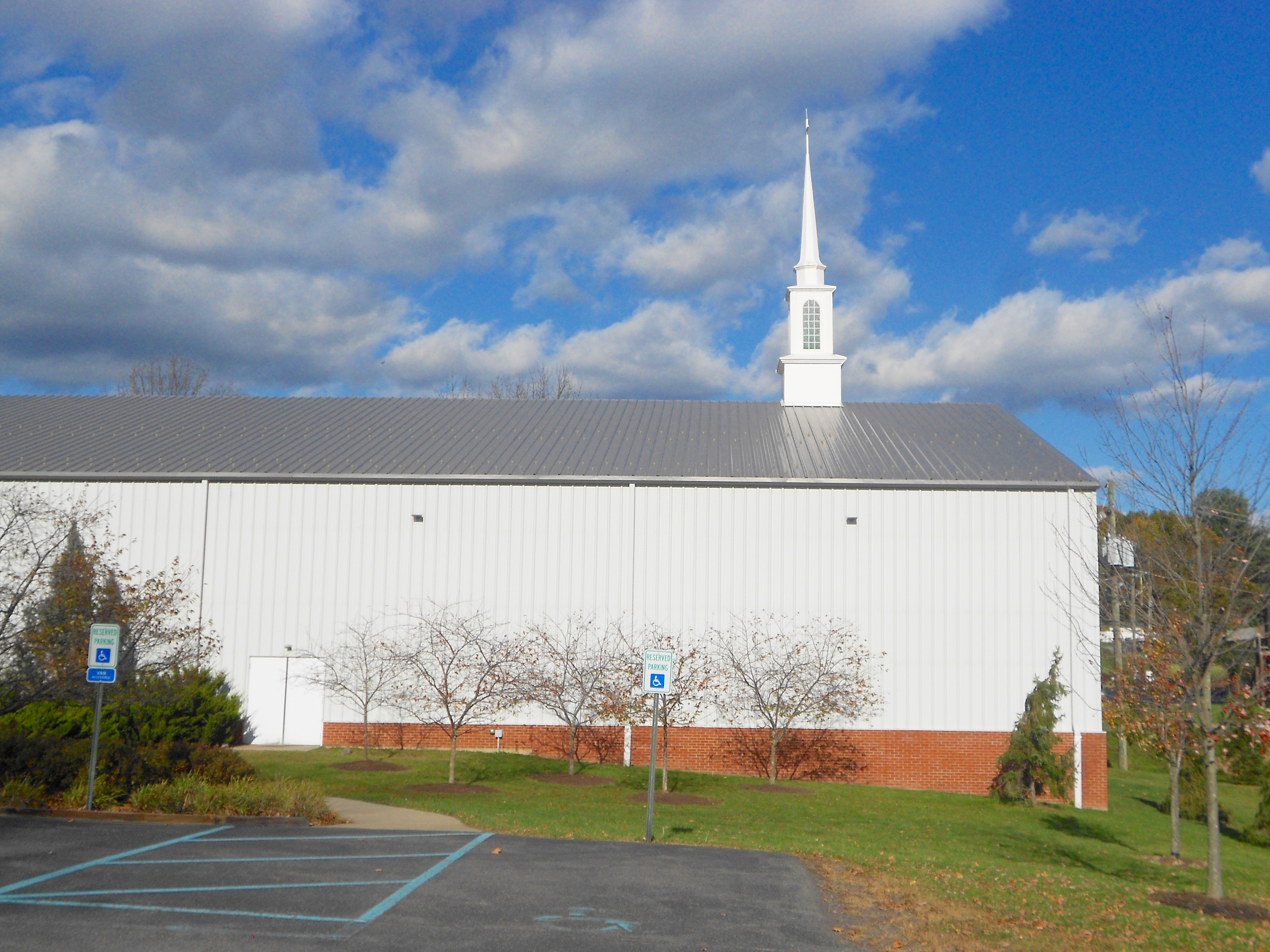
Cross Creek Community Church

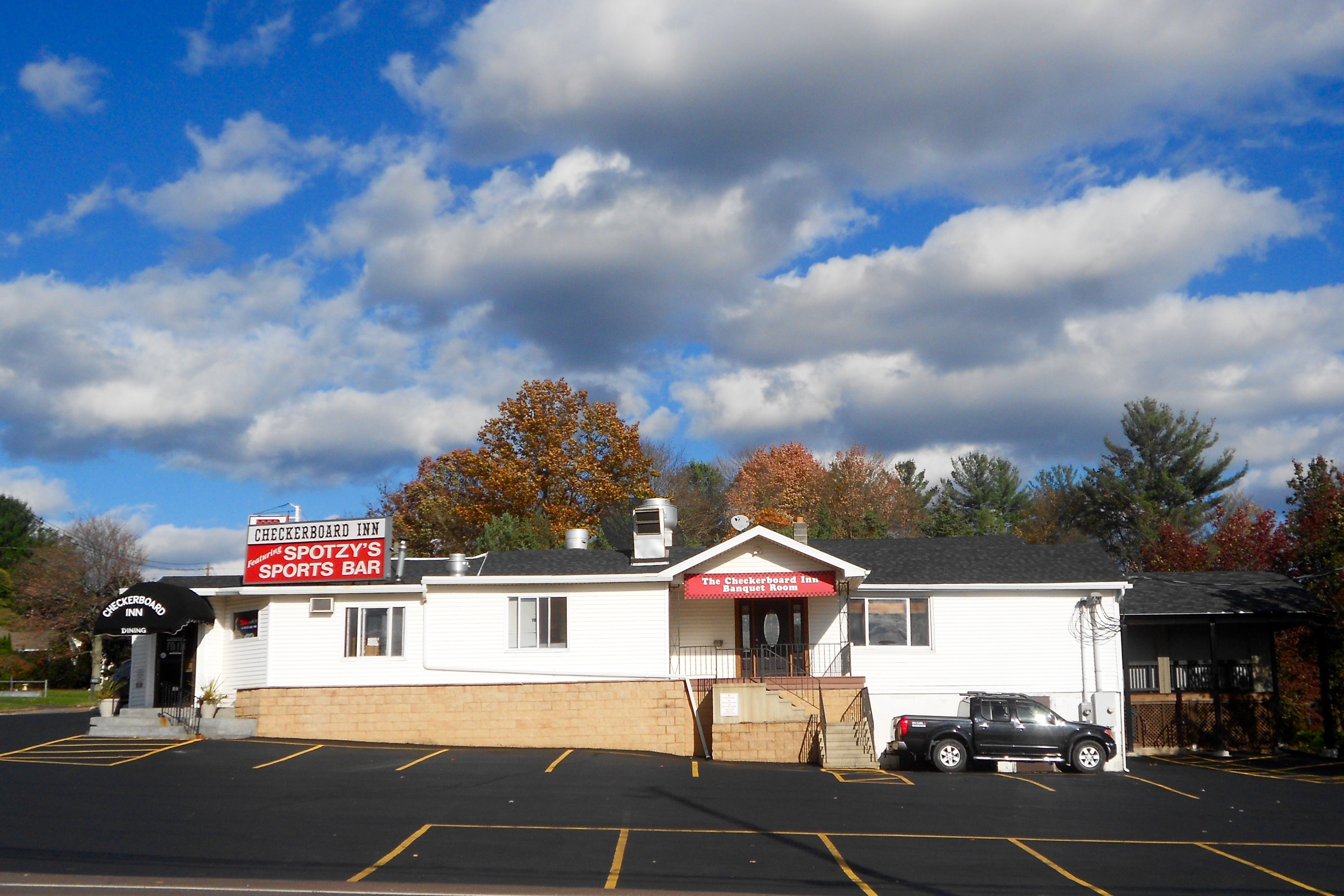
Checkerboard Inn
