= Dallas School District =

School district in Pennsylvania

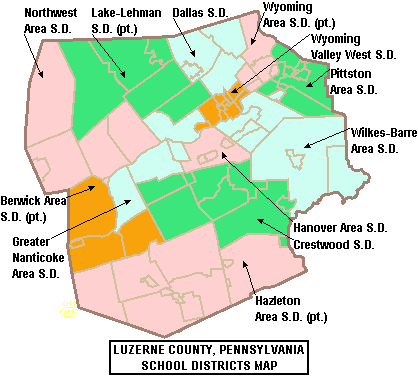
- Map of Luzerne County, Pennsylvania School Districts with the Dallas School District in blue in the northern part of the county.

Address
- 2000 Conyngham Avenue Dallas, Luzerne, Pennsylvania, 18612; United States

District information
- Type: Public

Other information
- Website: District Website

The Dallas School District is a school district covering the Borough of Dallas and Dallas Township, Franklin Township and Kingston Township in Luzerne County, Pennsylvania. Dallas School District encompasses approximately 46 square miles. According to 2000 federal census data, it serves a resident population of 19,482. By 2010, the district's population rose to 20,558 people. The educational attainment levels for the Dallas School District population (25 years old and over) were 92.9% high school graduates and 35.6% college graduates. The district is one of the 500 public school districts of Pennsylvania.

According to the Pennsylvania Budget and Policy Center, 15.5% of the district's pupils lived at 185% or below the Federal Poverty Level as shown by their eligibility for the federal free or reduced price school meal programs in 2012. In 2013 the Pennsylvania Department of Education, reported that fewer than 10 of the students in the Dallas School District were homeless. In Luzerne County, the median household income was $44,402. By 2013, the median household income in the United States rose to $52,100. In 2014, the median household income in the USA was $53,700.

In 2009, the district residents' per capita Income was reported as $23,984 while the median family income was $60,285. In the Commonwealth, the median family income was $49,501 and the United States median family income was $49,445, in 2010.

The Dallas School District operates four schools: Dallas High School, Dallas Middle School, Dallas Intermediate School, and Wycallis Primary Center. Dallas Elementary School, previously operating in tandem with what was once Wycallis Elementary, was closed and torn down in 2019. Prior to the start of the 2019–2020 school year, the district reconfigured its elementary grades, housing all kindergarten, first, and second grade students in the renamed Wycallis Primary Center, and all third, fourth, and fifth grade students in the newly constructed Dallas Intermediate School. Beginning in the 2021–2022 school year, Wycallis Primary Center transitioned to full-day kindergarten. High school students may choose to attend the West Side Career and Technology Center for training in the construction and mechanical trades. For the 2014–15 school year, 35 resident students chose to enroll in public, cyber charter schools, rather than attend the district's schools. The Luzerne Intermediate Unit IU18 provides the district with a wide variety of services like: specialized education for disabled students; state mandated training on recognizing and reporting child abuse; speech and visual disability services; criminal background check processing for prospective employees and professional development for staff and faculty.

== Boundary ==
The district includes Dallas borough, as well as the following census-designated places: Misericordia University, Shavertown, and Trucksville.

== Extracurriculars ==
The district offers a summer aquatics program that is open to all district residents. All lessons are taught by ARC certified Water Safety Instructors. The district's students have access to a variety of clubs, activities and an extensive sports program.

== Sports ==
The Girls field hockey team won the 2007 PIAA District 2 championship and were state semi-finalists. They also peaked at #6 in the National Polls midway through the season. The Boys and Girls soccer teams also won district championships in the 2007–2008 school year along with the softball team and Girls Track and Field team which has won 3 consecutive district 2 titles (2005, 2006, 2007). In the 2008-2009 year, the teams from Dallas to win district titles are Boys Cross Country, Girls Cross Country, Girls diving, Girls Soccer, and Softball. State Championships from Dallas include, Football in 1993, Girls Cross Country in 2003 and 2005, Girls Soccer in 2007, and Baseball in 2017.
