= Francis T. McAndrew =

American social psychologist

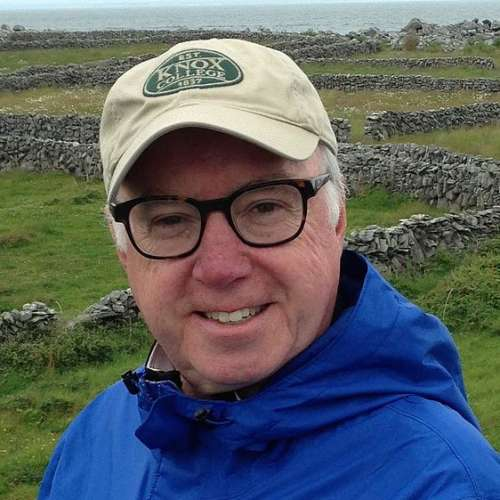
- Born: January 27, 1953 (age 73); Augsburg, West Germany
- Education: University of Maine
- Known for: Evolutionary psychology
- Scientific career
- Fields: Psychology
- Workplaces: Knox College

Francis T. "Frank" McAndrew (born January 27, 1953, in Augsburg, West Germany) is an American social psychologist and the Cornelia H. Dudley Professor of Psychology at Knox College in Galesburg, Illinois. At Knox, he founded the environmental studies program and chaired the psychology department for a decade. McAndrew is an elected fellow of numerous professional organizations, including the Association for Psychological Science, the Society for Personality and Social Psychology, the Society of Experimental Social Psychology, and the Midwestern Psychological Association (Charter Fellow). He received a B.S. in psychology from King's College in Pennsylvania and also a Ph.D. in Experimental Psychology from the University of Maine.

Early in his career, McAndrew specialized in the study of environmental psychology and nonverbal communication. He is the author of one of the classic texts in the field, Environmental Psychology. In mid-career, he moved into the study of evolutionary psychology where he became best known for his pioneering work on gossip, creepiness, and the psychology of mass shootings.

In recent years, McAndrew has become an essayist and purveyor of psychological science to lay audiences. He has published in dozens of well-known popular media outlets such as Time, CNN, The Guardian, and Scientific American. He is also a blogger for Psychology Today Magazine.

McAndrew grew up in the Northeastern Pennsylvania towns of Scranton and Dallas. He is married and has a son, a daughter, and a granddaughter. He was a wrestler in high school and college, and he coached the Knox College wrestling team for almost 30 years, with twelve years as the head coach.
