= Fletcher C. Booker Jr. =

US Army major general (1920–2012)

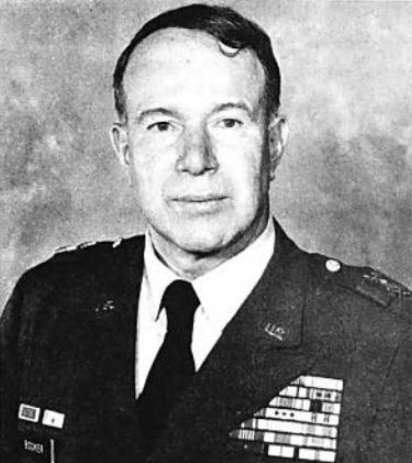
- Booker as a major general in 1979
- Born: May 7, 1920; Brooklyn, New York, US
- Died: October 10, 2012 (aged 92); Jupiter, Florida, US
- Burial place: Fern Knoll Burial Park, Dallas, Pennsylvania, US
- Education: Virginia Military Institute
- Spouse(s): Val Jean C. Relph (m. 1942–1953) Helen Carter Hall (m. 1957–1985)
- Children: 2
- Military career
- Service: United States Army
- Service years: 1941–1980
- Rank: Major General; Lieutenant General (Pennsylvania, retired)
- Service number: 0416877
- Unit: US Army Field Artillery Branch
- Commands: 2nd Battalion, 109th Field Artillery Regiment; 28th Infantry Division Artillery; 28th Infantry Division
- Wars: World War II; Occupation of Germany; Korean War
- Awards: Army Distinguished Service Medal; Legion of Merit; Bronze Star Medal; Meritorious Service Medal; Full List
- Other work: President, Booker Brothers Inc.

Fletcher C. Booker Jr. (7 May 1920 – 10 October 2012) was a career officer in the United States Army. A longtime member of the Pennsylvania Army National Guard, he attained the rank of major general as commander of the 28th Infantry Division. A veteran of World War II and the Korean War, Booker's awards and decorations included the Army Distinguished Service Medal, Legion of Merit, and Bronze Star Medal.

Booker was born in Brooklyn, New York and raised and educated in Wilkes-Barre, Pennsylvania and Kingston, Pennsylvania. He graduated from Virginia's Fork Union Military Academy in 1937, and received his BA degree from the Virginia Military Institute (VMI) in 1941. Booker completed the Reserve Officers' Training Corps while at VMI and after graduating he received his commission as a second lieutenant of Field Artillery. He entered active duty for World War II and served with a training battalion at Fort Bragg, North Carolina until departing for Europe in 1943. Booker served in the 777th Field Artillery Battalion as a battery commander, battalion liaison officer, and logistics staff officer (S-4). He advanced through the ranks to major during his wartime service, and the awards he received included the Bronze Star Medal.

After his discharge from active duty in 1946, Booker served in the United States Army Reserve as executive officer in the 772nd Field Artillery Battalion. In 1948, he transferred his military membership to the Pennsylvania Army National Guard and was appointed executive officer of the 976th Armored Field Artillery Battalion. During the Korean War, Booker served as a senior advisor to artillery units of the Republic of Korea Army. After returning to the United States, he was assigned as operations officer (S-3) for the 31st Infantry Division Artillery at Camp Atterbury, Indiana. After returning to Pennsylvania, Booker was appointed executive officer of the 109th Field Artillery Regiment. In 1959, Booker was appointed commander of 2nd Battalion, 109th Field Artillery, and in 1968 he was named commander of the 28th Infantry Division Artillery.

In October 1972, Booker was assigned as assistant division commander (ADC) of the New York National Guard's 42nd Infantry Division, and he was promoted to brigadier general in 1973. In April 1975, Booker returned to the 28th Infantry Division as ADC. He served in this post until May 1977, when he was selected to command the division and promoted to major general. Booker served until reaching the mandatory retirement age of 60 in 1980, and received the Legion of Merit and state promotion to lieutenant general on the retired list in recognition of his many years of service. In retirement, Booker resided in Craigville, Massachusetts and Tequesta, Florida. He died at Hospice of Palm Beach County in Jupiter, Florida on 10 October 2012. Booker was a longtime resident of Dallas, Pennsylvania, and was buried at Fern Knoll Burial Park in Dallas.

== Early life ==
Fletcher Clement Booker Jr. was born in Brooklyn, New York on 7 May 1920, the son of Fletcher C. Booker Sr. and Mildred (Ashford) Booker. Booker's father and uncle founded Booker Brothers, a successful stock brokerage in Wilkes-Barre, Pennsylvania, and Booker was raised and educated in Wilkes-Barre and Kingston. In 1937, he graduated from Fork Union Military Academy. Booker then attended the Virginia Military Institute, from which he graduated in 1941 with a Bachelor of Arts degree. At VMI, Booker took part in the Reserve Officers' Training Corps program, and at graduation he received his commission as a second lieutenant of Field Artillery in the Organized Reserve Corps.

== Start of career ==
After receiving his commission, Booker entered United States Army active duty for World War II. He served initially as a platoon leader and battery executive officer with a training battalion at Fort Bragg, North Carolina, and he completed the Field Artillery Officer Basic Course in 1943. After graduation, he joined the 777th Field Artillery Battalion, a unit of the Ninth United States Army. The 777th was made up of white officers and African American soldiers, and Booker served as commander of a battery, a liaison officer at the battalion headquarters, and the battalion's logistics staff officer (S-4) during combat in Europe. He attained the rank of major during his wartime service, and he received the Bronze Star Medal. Booker remained on active duty after the end of the war in Europe, and he took part in the Occupation of Germany.

After the Second World War, Booker returned to Pennsylvania and joined the Booker Brothers firm, in which he ascended through the leadership ranks to become the company's president. He also continued his military service when he joined the United States Army Reserve and was appointed executive officer of the 772nd Field Artillery Battalion. In May 1948, he transferred his military membership to the Pennsylvania Army National Guard and was appointed executive officer of the 976th Armored Field Artillery Battalion. In 1951, he graduate from the Field Artillery Officer Advanced Course. When the battalion, including Booker, was federalized in April 1951 for service during the Korean War, he took part in pre-deployment training at Fort Sill, Oklahoma. He was subsequently assigned to the Korean Military Advisory Group, and he served as a senior artillery advisor to first a Republic of Korea Army (ROK) artillery battalion, and later the (ROK) 1st Infantry Division Artillery. Upon returning to the United States, Booker served as operations officer (S-3) for the 31st Infantry Division Artillery, which was then stationed at Camp Atterbury, Indiana.

== Continued career ==
In 1955, Booker was appointed executive officer of the 109th Field Artillery Regiment. In 1959, he was assigned as commander of 2nd Battalion, 109th Field Artillery. He served in this position until February 1968, when he was assigned to command the 28th Infantry Division Artillery. In 1966, Booker graduated from the Division Artillery Staff Officer Refresher Course. In 1968, he graduated from the United States Army Command and General Staff College. From 1968 to 1975, he completed annual Command and General Staff College Refresher Courses, and in 1969 and 1970, he graduated from the Artillery Staff Officer Refresher Course.

In October 1972, Booker was appointed assistant division commander (ADC) of the 42nd Infantry Division, a unit of the New York Army National Guard. In July 1973, he was promoted to brigadier general. In April 1975, he was assigned as ADC of the 28th Infantry Division. In both 1972 and 1977, Booker commanded National Guard task forces that performed disaster relief duties following extensive flooding in Pennsylvania.

In May 1977, Booker was appointed as commander of the 28th Infantry Division, and in July he was promoted to major general. After receiving this promotion, Booker sold the Booker Brothers firm and made his military assignment his fulltime profession, working as a volunteer on weekdays to plan and oversee execution of individual and collective training. He continued to serve until reaching the mandatory retirement age of 60 in May 1980. At his retirement, Booker was promoted to lieutenant general on Pennsylvania's retired list in recognition of his decades of military service. In addition, he received and the Army Distinguished Service Medal and Legion of Merit.

== Retirement and death ==
Booker was a past president of the Wilkes-Barre Chapter of the Pennsylvania Association for the Blind. He served as president of the 109th Artillery Historical and War Museum. In addition, he was a director of the Wyoming Valley Chapter of the American Red Cross, and a former president of the Penn Mountain Boy Scout Council. Booker was active in Scottish Rite and York Rite Masonry, and attained the 33rd degree of the Scottish Rite. He belonged to the Wilkes-Barre area Kiwanis and chamber of commerce. Booker was a member of the National Guard Association of the United States and Pennsylvania National Guard Association. His memberships also included the Association of the United States Army and the British Officers Club of Philadelphia. He was also a member of the Beach Club in Centerville, Massachusetts.

In retirement, Booker was a resident of Tequesta, Florida and Craigville, Massachusetts. He died at Hospice of Palm Beach County in Jupiter, Florida on 10 October 2012. Booker was a longtime resident of Dallas, Pennsylvania, and he was buried at Fern Knoll Burial Park in Dallas.

== Family ==
In 1942, Booker married Val Jean C. Relph. They were married until her death in 1953, and were the parents of a son and a daughter. In 1957, he married Helen Carter Hall, who died in 1985.

== Awards ==
Booker's federal awards included:

- Army Distinguished Service Medal
- Legion of Merit
- Bronze Star Medal
- Meritorious Service Medal
- American Defense Service Medal
- American Campaign Medal
- European–African–Middle Eastern Campaign Medal with two service stars
- Army of Occupation Medal
- National Defense Service Medal
- Armed Forces Reserve Medal
- United Nations Service Medal Korea
- Republic of Korea Presidential Unit Citation

Booker's state awards included:

- Pennsylvania Meritorious Service Medal
- Pennsylvania Commendation Ribbon
- New York Commendation Medal
- Pennsylvania Service Ribbon
- Pennsylvania 20-year Service Medal
- General Thomas J. Stewart Medal
- General Thomas R. White Medal

== Dates of rank ==
Booker's dates of rank were:

- Second Lieutenant, 29 September 1941
- First Lieutenant, 26 May 1942
- Captain, 12 January 1943
- Major, 17 April 1946
- Lieutenant Colonel, 15 September 1959
- Colonel, 6 November 1968
- Brigadier General, 20 July 1973
- Major General, July 1977
- Major General (retired), 7 May 1980
- Lieutenant General (retired list), 7 May 1980
