= Dallas, Pennsylvania =

Borough in Pennsylvania, US

- Borough
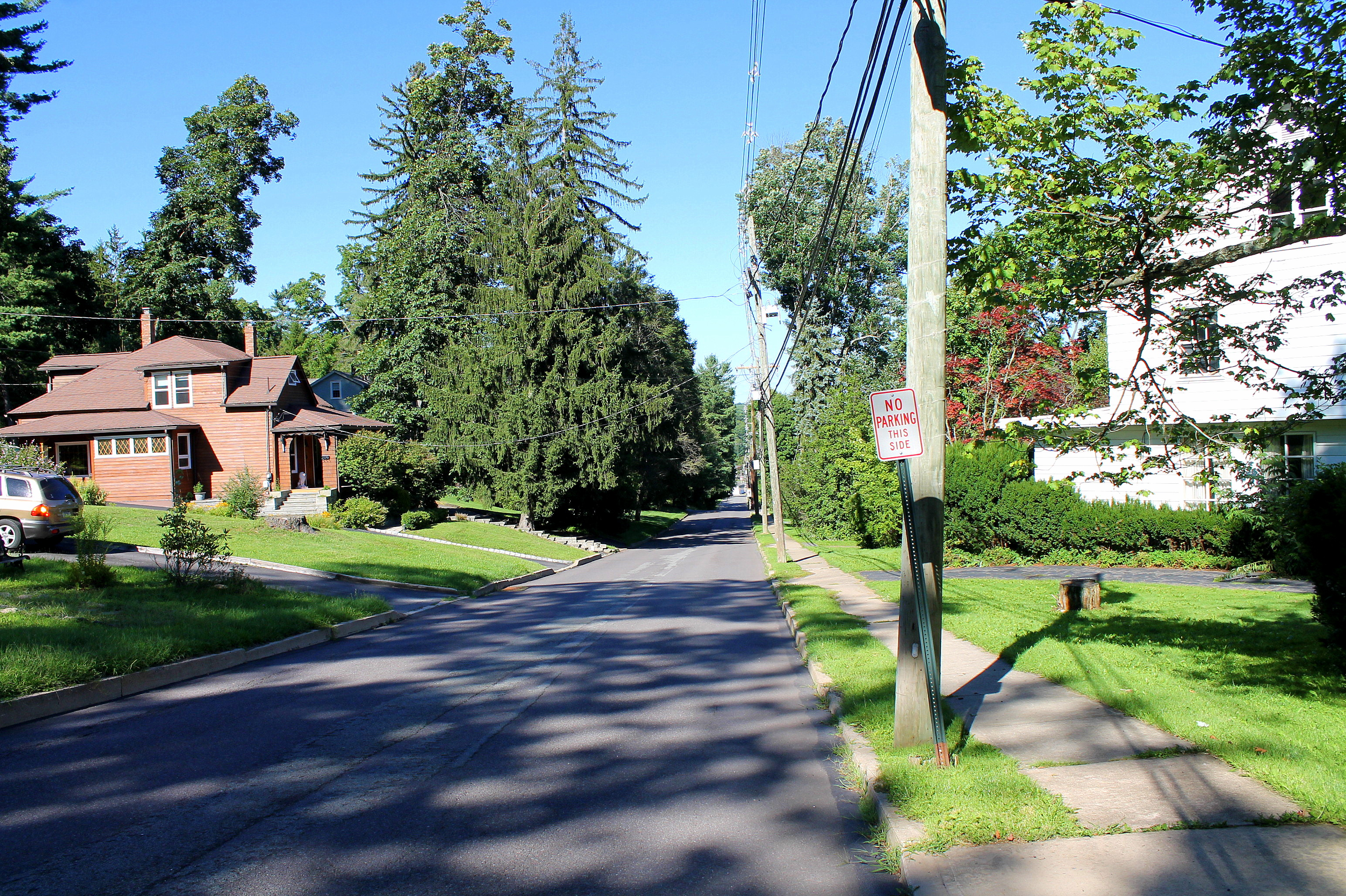
- Typical street in Dallas
- Motto: "The Pride of the Back Mountain"
- Location of Dallas in Luzerne County, Pennsylvania.

- Location within Pennsylvania Location within the United States
- Coordinates: 41°20′0″N 75°58′0″W
- Country: United States
- State: Pennsylvania
- County: Luzerne
- Settled: 1797
- Incorporated: 1879

Government
  - Type: Borough Council

Area
  - Total: 2.39 sq mi (6.19 km^{2})
  - Land: 2.30 sq mi (5.96 km^{2})
  - Water: 0.085 sq mi (0.22 km^{2})
- Elevation: 1,243 ft (379 m)

Population (2020)
  - Total: 2,694
  - Density: 1,170.5/sq mi (451.94/km^{2})
- Time zone: UTC-5 (Eastern (EST))
  - Summer (DST): UTC-4 (EDT)
- ZIP code: 18612
- Area code: 570
- FIPS code: 42-18048
- Website: www.dallasborough.org

Dallas is a borough in Luzerne County, Pennsylvania, United States. The population was 2,692 at the 2020 census. The local government describes the borough as the "Pride" of the Back Mountain (a 118 square mile region in northern Luzerne County). The area includes the townships of Dallas, Franklin, Jackson, Kingston, Lake, and Lehman. The region also includes the boroughs of Dallas and Harveys Lake. Dallas is in the vicinity of Misericordia University and Dallas State Correctional Institution (which holds 2,150 inmates).

== History ==
Dallas was first settled in 1797. It was later incorporated as a borough on April 21, 1879, from land entirely within Dallas Township. The township had been formed in 1817 and was named for Alexander J. Dallas, who was the 6th United States Secretary of the Treasury and the father of George M. Dallas, the vice president of James Polk.

== Geography ==
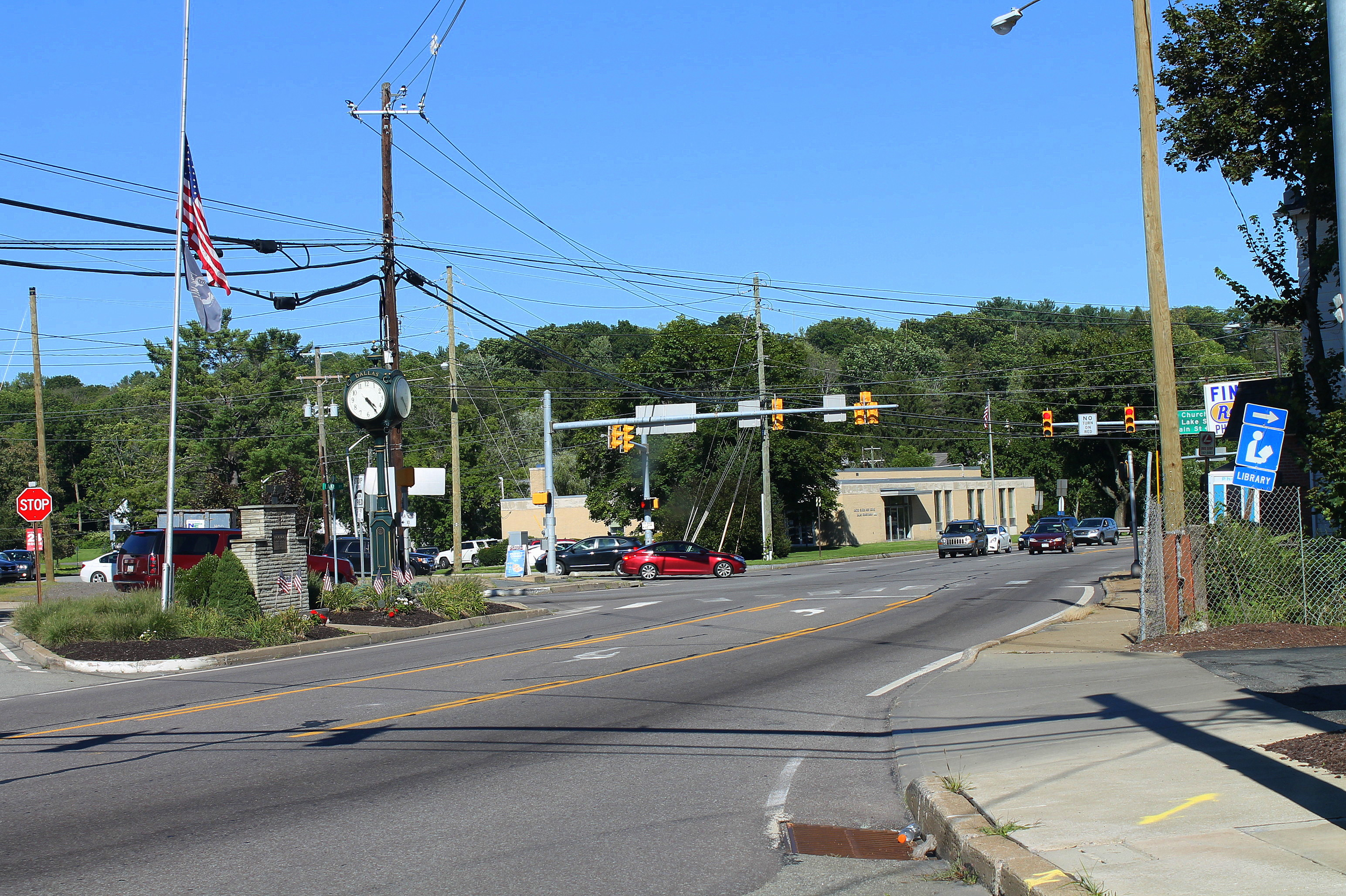
Pennsylvania Route 415 in Dallas

Dallas is located at 41°20′0″N 75°58′0″W.

According to the United States Census Bureau, the borough has a total area of 2.4 square miles (6.2 km^{2}), of which 2.3 square miles (6.0 km^{2}) is land and 0.1 square miles (0.26 km^{2}), or 3.78%, is water.

Most of Dallas is urbanized; however, there are pockets of forests scattered throughout the borough. PA 309 and PA 415 travel through the northern and eastern sections of Dallas. The Huntsville Reservoir makes up the community's southwestern border. Dallas Township borders the borough from the north, east, and south. Lehman Township borders the community from the west.

== Demographics ==
Historical population
Census	Pop.	Note	%±
1880	272		—
1890	415		52.6%
1900	543		30.8%
1910	576		6.1%
1920	581		0.9%
1930	1,188		104.5%
1940	1,484		24.9%
1950	1,674		12.8%
1960	2,586		54.5%
1970	2,398		−7.3%
1980	2,679		11.7%
1990	2,567		−4.2%
2000	2,557		−0.4%
2010	2,804		9.7%
2020	2,694		−3.9%
2021 (est.)	2,687	▼	−0.3%

At the 2000 census there were 2,557 people, 1,031 households, and 715 families residing in the borough. The population density was 1,116.9 inhabitants per square mile (431.2/km^{2}). There were 1,094 housing units at an average density of 477.8 units per square mile (184.5 units/km^{2}). The racial makeup of the borough was 97.97% White, 0.47% African American, 0.08% Native American, 0.78% Asian, 0.12% from other races, and 0.59% from two or more races. Hispanic or Latino of any race were 0.66% of the population.

There were 1,031 households, 29.4% had children under the age of 18 living with them, 58.5% were married couples living together, 8.5% had a female householder with no husband present, and 30.6% were non-families. 25.4% of households were made up of individuals, and 11.2% were one person aged 65 or older. The average household size was 2.44 and the average family size was 2.96.

In the borough the population was spread out, with 21.8% under the age of 18, 6.5% from 18 to 24, 27.4% from 25 to 44, 26.4% from 45 to 64, and 17.8% 65 or older. The median age was 42 years. For every 100 females there were 90.0 males. For every 100 females age 18 and over, there were 85.0 males.

The median household income was $48,696 and the median family income was $57,344. Males had a median income of $41,500 versus $25,571 for females. The per capita income for the borough was $24,466. About 3.5% of families and 5.8% of the population were below the poverty line, including 6.0% of those under age 18 and 4.7% of those age 65 or over.

== Education ==
The school district is the Dallas School District.

Misericordia University maintains a property in Dallas Borough. The majority of the university grounds, and all of the associated census-designated place, are in Dallas Township.

== Notable people ==
- Fletcher C. Booker Jr., US Army major general
- Greg Manusky, NFL Football Player & coach for multiple NFL teams.
- Francis T. McAndrew, social psychologist, professor, and author
- Dan Meuser, U.S. Congressman
- Paige Selenski, U.S. Olympic field hockey player, 2012 Summer Olympics
- Stacey Williams, fashion model
