= Franklin Coslett =

American politician

Member of the Pennsylvania House of Representatives from the 120th district
- In office January 2, 1979 – November 30, 1986
- Preceded by: Frank O'Connell
- Succeeded by: Scott Dietterick

Personal details
- Born: October 20, 1921 Edwardsville, Pennsylvania
- Died: January 28, 2011 (aged 89) Kingston, Pennsylvania
- Party: Republican

Franklin Coslett (October 20, 1921 – January 28, 2011) was a Republican member of the Pennsylvania House of Representatives who served as the State Representative for the 120th legislative district of Pennsylvania from 1979 to 1986. His tenure in Harrisburg was an era marked by superb constituent service, especially in aiding seniors in receiving prescription drug benefits. Before his time in the State House, Coslett was a civic leader in his hometown of Kingston, Pennsylvania, the largest municipality in and the seat of the 120th district. Indeed, at one point, he served as the President of the Kingston borough council. After retiring from the Pennsylvania House in 1986, Coslett was succeeded by Republican Scott Dietterick. The seat Coslett and Dietterick occupied is currently held by Republican Aaron Kaufer, who succeeded longtime Democratic representative Phyllis Mundy after Mundy's 2014 retirement.
