= Evelyn C. Roat =

American writer (1903-1995)

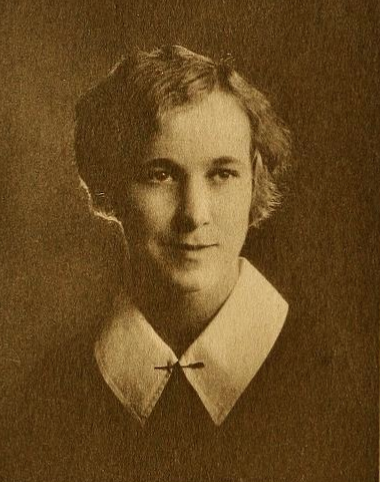
- Evelyn C. Roat, from the 1925 yearbook of Wellesley College
- Born: Evelyn Carol Roat; September 6, 1903; Kingston, Pennsylvania, U.S.
- Died: March 10, 1995 (aged 91); Plains Township, Pennsylvania, U.S.
- Occupations: Writer, editor

Evelyn Carol Roat (September 6, 1903 – March 10, 1995) was an American writer and editor. She wrote and edited short non-fiction books about the Southwest, including Geology of the Grand Canyon (1976).

== Early life and education ==
Roat was from Kingston, Pennsylvania, the daughter of Henry Gabriel Roat and Mary Agnes Baldwin Roat. Her father owned a hardware store. She graduated from Wyoming Seminary in 1921, and from Wellesley College in 1925. She was a member of Phi Beta Kappa and the Wellesley rowing team.

== Career ==
Roat edited psychology journals at Princeton University after college. She worked at a cattle ranch in Wilcox, Arizona, in 1943. In the 1950s she lived in Flagstaff and worked at the Museum of Northern Arizona, as assistant to the curator and editor of the museum's quarterly publication, Plateau. She wrote books and pamphlets for the museum about local topics, including geology and Hopi and Navajo cultures. In 1956 she worked with anthropologist Katharine Bartlett, Gene Field Foster, and others, on an archaeological expedition ahead of the blasting at Glen Canyon Dam. She was active in the American Association of University Women, and the Flagstaff writers' club. She was the New Mexico and Arizona representative for the Wellesley Alumnae Association.

== Publications ==
- "Current Trends in Public Relations" (1939)
- This is a Hopi Kachina (1962, with Barton Wright)
- The Museum of Northern Arizona (1968)
- Geology of the Grand Canyon (1974, with William J. Breed)

== Personal life ==
Roat donated her books and collections to the Museum of Northern Arizona when she left Flagstaff. She died in 1995 in Plains Township, Pennsylvania, at age 91.
