= Frank O'Connell =

American politician

Frank J. O'Connell

Member of the Pennsylvania Senate from the 20th district
- In office January 2, 1979 – August 31, 1985
- Preceded by: T. Newell Wood
- Succeeded by: Charles Lemmond

Member of the Pennsylvania House of Representatives from the 120th district
- In office January 7, 1969 – November 30, 1978
- Preceded by: District Created
- Succeeded by: Franklin Coslett

Member of the Pennsylvania House of Representatives from the Luzerne County district
- In office January 2, 1967 – November 30, 1968

Personal details
- Born: December 26, 1923 Larksville, Pennsylvania
- Died: January 31, 2004 (aged 80) Port St. Lucie, Florida

Frank J. O'Connell, Jr. (December 22, 1923 – January 31, 2004) was an American politician from Pennsylvania who served as a Republican member of the Pennsylvania State Senate for the 20th district from 1979 to 1985.

He also served in the Pennsylvania House of Representatives for the 120th district from 1969 to 1978 and the Luzerne County district from 1967 to 1968.

== Early life and education ==
O'Connell was born in Larksville, Pennsylvania, and graduated from St. Mary's High School.

He served in the U.S. Army for two years in Europe during World War II, and later became a businessman who owned and operated the Kingston House restaurant and Columbia Catering.

== Career ==
O'Connell served on the Kingston Borough council from 1960 to 1971. Elected to the Pennsylvania House of Representatives for the 120th district in 1967, he served five consecutive terms including as Minority Caucus Chairman from 1975 to 1976.

He then served as a member of the Pennsylvania Senate for the 20th district from 1979 to 1985.

== Death ==
O'Connell died on January 31, 2004, in Port St. Lucia, Florida, and was interred at the Mount Olivet Cemetery in Kingston Township, Pennsylvania.
