= Scott Dietterick =

American politician

Member of the Pennsylvania House of Representatives from the 120th district
- In office 1987–1990
- Preceded by: Franklin Coslett
- Succeeded by: Phyllis Mundy

Personal details
- Born: February 10, 1941 Wilkes-Barre, Pennsylvania
- Died: February 22, 2015 (aged 74) Kingston, Pennsylvania
- Party: Republican

G. Scott Dietterick III (February 10, 1941 – February 22, 2015) was a Republican member of the Pennsylvania House of Representatives who served in the legislature from 1987 to 1991.

He was born in Wilkes-Barre, Pennsylvania.

He was a graduate of Kingston High School (Pennsylvania); attended Wilkes College for a time and then joined the U.S. Navy, serving as an electronics technician on the USS McKean. Upon honorable discharge from the service, he returned home to work in the family business as a licensed independent agent/adjuster. In 1975, he founded Wyoming Valley Insurance, an insurance business.

After nine years on the Kingston City Council, he ran for the Pennsylvania State Legislature and served for two consecutive terms in the 120th district from 1987 to 1991.

He was convicted of charges related to insurance fraud in October 1990, a month before the election. Dietterick sued unsuccessfully to remove his name from the state ballot and lost in a landslide to Democrat Phyllis Mundy.

Dietterick was spared a jail sentence. His supporters packed the courtroom on the day of his sentencing and he received overwhelming support from his community, according to news accounts at the time.

In 1995, he worked for FEMA, as a community relations specialist, traveling the United States and Puerto Rico, helping victims cope with their losses from Hurricane Georges. In 2000, he accepted a position with P.E.M.A., as an emergency management specialist planning hazardous materials exercises. He retired in 2008. Dietterick died of cancer in 2015 at the age of 74.
