= Brenda Pugh =

American politician from Pennsylvania

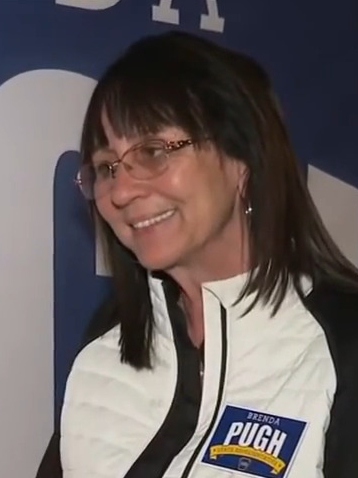
- Pugh in 2024

Member of the Pennsylvania House of Representatives from the 120th district
- Incumbent
- Assumed office December 1, 2024
- Preceded by: Aaron Kaufer

Personal details
- Party: Republican

Brenda Pugh is an American politician that represents the 120th district of the Pennsylvania House of Representatives as a Republican since 2024.

== Early life ==
Pugh was the CEO of AMP Global Strategies, a security company that works with law enforcement and schools. At the time of her election, Pugh was the president of the Back Mountain Chamber of Commerce.

== Representative ==
Incumbent representative Aaron Kaufer decided not to run for re-election. Pugh defeated Democrat Fern Leard in the general election.

Pennsylvania House of Representatives
Preceded by Aaron Kaufer	Member of the Pennsylvania House of Representatives from the 120th district 2024–present	Succeeded by
