= John Quackenbush =

American bioinformatician

- Born: Kingston, Pennsylvania, United States
- Education: California Institute of Technology (B.S.); University of California, Los Angeles (Ph.D.)
- Known for: bioinformatics, computational biology, microarray analysis, genomics, functional genomics
- Scientific career
- Workplaces: Harvard University; Dana–Farber Cancer Institute; Institute for Molecular Bioscience (University of Queensland)
- Thesis: Gauge field theory in two space-time dimensions: Anomalies and applications to string models (1990)
- Doctoral advisor: Terry Tomboulis
- Website: Harvard profile Dana–Farber profile

John Quackenbush is an American computational biologist and genome scientist. He is a professor of biostatistics and computational biology and a professor of cancer biology at the Dana–Farber Cancer Institute (DFCI), as well as the director of its Center for Cancer Computational Biology (CCCB). Quackenbush also holds an appointment as a professor of computational biology and bioinformatics in the Department of Biostatistics at the Harvard School of Public Health.

== Education and early life ==
A native of Mountain Top, Pennsylvania, Quackenbush attended Bishop Hoban High School in Wilkes Barre, graduating in 1979, after which he attended the California Institute of Technology, where he earned a bachelor's degree in physics. He went on to earn a doctorate in theoretical physics from the University of California, Los Angeles in 1990.

== Career and research ==
After working two years as a postdoctoral fellow in physics, Quackenbush was awarded a Special Emphasis Research Career Award from the National Center for Human Genome Research (the predecessor of the National Human Genome Research Institute), and subsequently spent the next two years at the Salk Institute working on physical maps of human chromosome 11, followed by another two years at Stanford University developing new laboratory and computational strategies for sequencing the human genome.

In 1997, Quackenbush joined the faculty of The Institute for Genomic Research (TIGR) in Rockville, Maryland, where his focus began to shift to post-genomic applications, with an emphasis on microarray analysis. Using a combination of laboratory and computational approaches, Quackenbush and his group developed analytical methods based on the integration of data across domains to derive biological meaning from high-dimensional data.

In 2005, Quackenbush was appointed to his current positions at the Dana–Farber Cancer Institute and the Harvard School of Public Health. Four years later, he launched the DFCI's Center for Cancer Computational Biology, which he directs and which provides broad-based bioinformatics and computational biology support to the research community through a collaborative consulting model, and which also performs and analyzes large-scale second-generation DNA sequencing.

Quackenbush's current research focuses on the analysis of human cancer using systems biology-based approaches to understanding and modeling the biological networks that underlie disease. This has led him and his colleagues to make fundamental discoveries about the role that variation in gene expression plays in defining biological phenotypes.

In 2010, Quackenbush and his colleagues at CCCB, together with investigators at National Jewish Health's Center for Genes, Environment and Health, University of Pittsburgh's Dorothy P. and Richard P. Simmons Center for Interstitial Lung Disease, Boston University's Section for Computational Biomedicine and the Pulmonary Center, and the University of Colorado Denver's Genomics Core Facility received an $11 million grant under the American Recovery and Reinvestment Act of 2009 to launch the Lung Genomics Research Consortium. This project, funded by the National Heart Lung and Blood Institute (NHLBI), will add genetic, genomic, and epigenetic data to a collection of clinical biological samples developed by the NHLBI's Lung Tissue Research Consortium. The consortium aims to use genomic technologies and advanced data-analysis tools on available patient lung-tissue samples to gain new insights into pulmonary disease and thus develop more effective, personalized treatments.

In 2011, Quackenbush published The Human Genome: Book of Essential Knowledge (Imagine Publishing, U.S.), which outlines the history, science, and implications of the Human Genome Project. He was also awarded a four-million-dollar fellowship bestowed by Australia's National Health and Medical Research Council to study chemotherapy resistant ovarian cancers in collaboration with colleagues at the University of Queensland's Institute for Molecular Bioscience.

Quackenbush currently serves on the editorial boards of five major journals and is editor-in-chief at Genomics. He has served on several committees at the National Academies and the Institute of Medicine, including the Committee on Validation of Toxicogenomic Technologies: A Focus on Chemical Classification Strategies, the Panel on Collecting, Storing, Accessing, and Protecting Biological Specimens and Biodata Social Science Surveys, and the Committee on the Review of Omics-Based Tests for Predicting Patient Outcomes in Clinical Trials. He is currently a member of scientific advisory boards at St. Jude Children's Research Hospital, the Lovelace Respiratory Research Institute, The Hope Funds for Cancer Research, and the National Institute for Health's Roadmap Epigenomics Project. Quackenbush is also a member of the scientific advisory boards of a number of biotech and precision medicine companies, including Caris Life Sciences, SynapDx, Perthera, and NABsys.

In 2011, Quackenbush, along with partner Mick Correll, founded Genospace, a software company focused on developing tools to enable precision genomic medicine. As of 2014, Quackenbush was the chief executive officer of Genospace. In the summer of 2013, Quackenbush was honored as a White House Open Science Champion of Change.

In January, 2017, Genospace was acquired by Hospital Corporation of America (HCA) and merged with HCA's Sarah Cannon cancer institute as a wholly owned subsidiary.

== Publications ==
Books

- Author, The Human Genome: Book of Essential Knowledge (Imagine Publishing, U.S., 2011)
- Contributor, Bioinformatics: A Practical Guide to the Analysis of Genes and Proteins (Wiley Interscience, 2004)
- Coauthor, Microarray Gene Expression Data Analysis: A Beginner's Guide (Wiley-Blackwell, 2003)
