= Pennsylvania House of Representatives, District 120 =

American legislative district

Pennsylvania's 120th State House of Representatives district
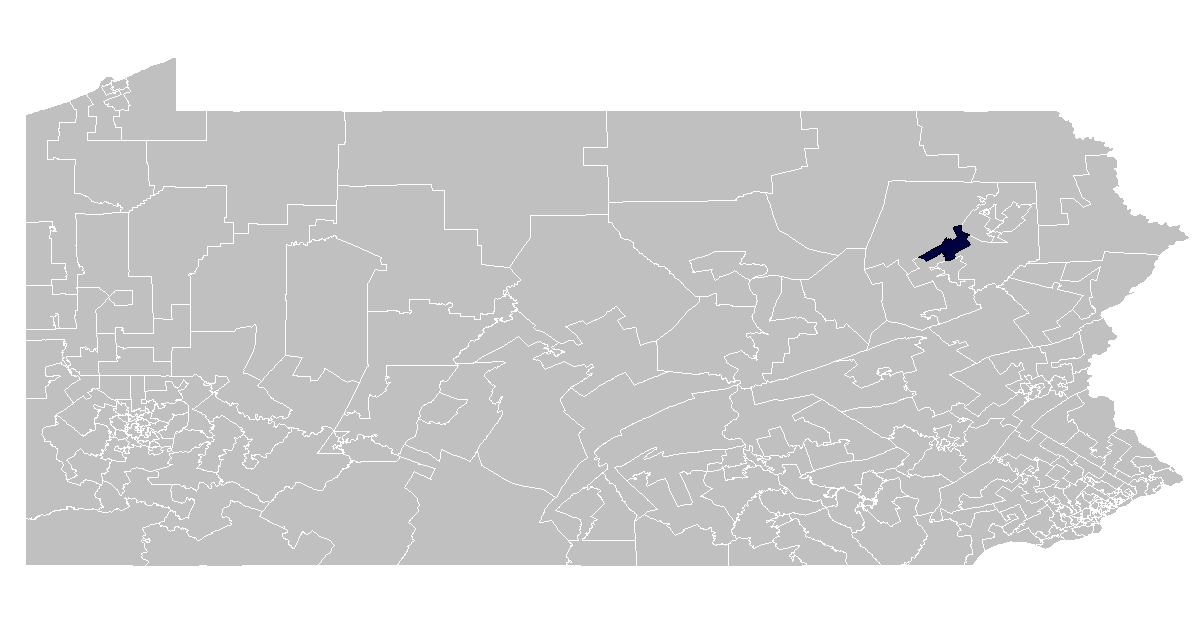
Representative
Brenda Pugh; R–Luzerne
- Demographics: 93.8% White; 3.4% Black; 2.2% Hispanic
- Population (2011) • Citizens of voting age: 62,171; 50,332

The 120th Pennsylvania House of Representatives District is located in Luzerne County and has been represented by Brenda Pugh since 2024. The district includes the following areas:

- Courtdale
- Dallas Township
- Exeter
- Exeter Township
- Forty Fort
- Franklin Township
- Jackson Township
- Kingston
- Kingston Township
- Luzerne
- Pringle
- Swoyersville
- West Wyoming
- Wyoming

== Representatives ==
Representative	Party	Years	District home	Note
Prior to 1969, seats were apportioned by county.
Frank J. O'Connell, Jr.	Republican	1969–1978	Kingston	Ran for State Senate
Franklin Coslett	Republican	1979–1986	Kingston	Retired
Scott Dietterick	Republican	1987–1990	Kingston	Defeated for reelection
Phyllis Mundy	Democrat	1991 – 2014	Kingston	Retired
Aaron Kaufer	Republican	2015 – 2024	Kingston	Retired
Brenda Pugh	Republican	2024 - Present	Dallas	Incumbent

During the 1990s, the district was predominantly Republican, especially in the towns of Kingston, West Pittston, and Shavertown. In recent years, the district has become increasingly Democratic. 57 percent of voters in the district are registered Democrats. It is a district that was carried by Al Gore in 2000, John Kerry in 2004, and Barack Obama in 2008. However, Republican Tom Corbett won the district in his race for governor in 2010. In 2012, incumbent President Obama won 55 percent of the district electorate. In 2016, businessman Donald Trump won the district. Kingston has been mostly Democratic since the late 2000s, West Pittston is now evenly split between the two parties, and Shavertown is only narrowly Republican now.

The current state representative for the district, Brenda Pugh, is a Republican.

== Recent election results ==
PA House election, 2010: Pennsylvania House, District 120
Party	Candidate	Votes	%	±%
Democratic	Phyllis Mundy	10,153	52.98	
Republican	Bill Goldsworthy	6,154	32.11	
Libertarian	Tim Mullen	2,858	14.91	
Margin of victory		3,999	24.52	
Turnout		19,165	100	

PA House election, 2012: Pennsylvania House, District 120
Party	Candidate	Votes	%	±%
Democratic	Phyllis Mundy	14,133	56.12	
Republican	Aaron Kaufer	11,050	43.88	
Margin of victory		3,083	12.24	▼12.28
Turnout		25,183	100	

PA House election, 2014: Pennsylvania House, District 120
Party	Candidate	Votes	%	±%
Republican	Aaron Kaufer	9,514	56.01	
Democratic	Eileen Cipriani	7,472	43.99	
Margin of victory		2,042	12.02	
Turnout		16,986	100	

PA House election, 2016: Pennsylvania House, District 120
Party	Candidate	Votes	%	±%
Republican	Aaron Kaufer	18,843	67.85	
Democratic	Robert McDonald	8,929	32.15	
Margin of victory		9,914	35.69	▲23.67
Turnout		27,772	100	
