= Craig Czury =

American poet

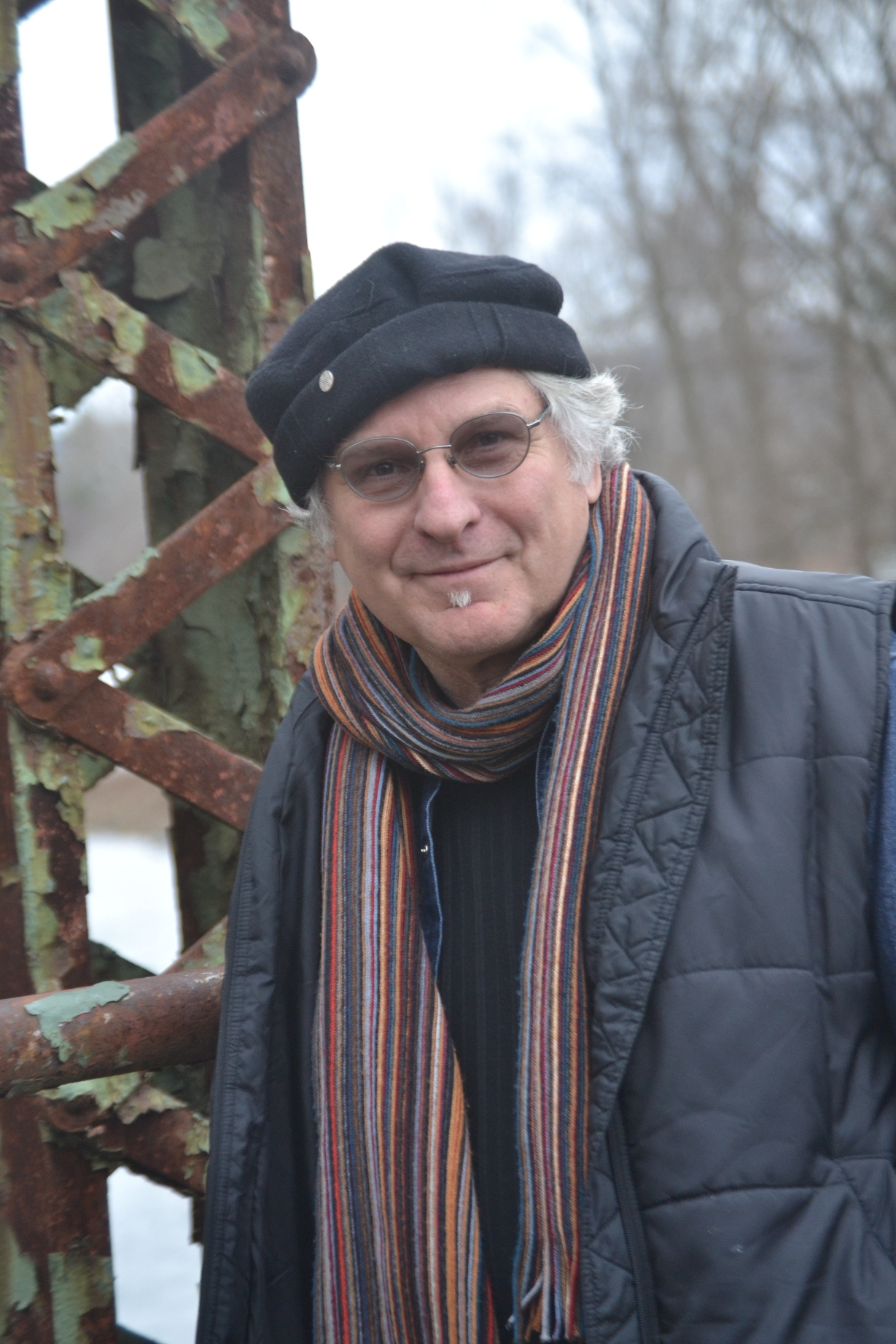
- Born: March 10, 1951 (age 75); Kingston, Pennsylvania, United States
- Occupation: Poet
- Writing career
- Period: 1975–
- Genre: Creative non-poetry
- Website: craigczury.com

Craig Czury (born March 10, 1951, in Kingston) is an American poet.

== Early life ==
Born in Kingston, to Betty Kawalkiewicz. He was adopted shortly thereafter by John and Nelda Churry. As a young man, Czury grew up in the northeastern Pennsylvania coal mining region near Shamokin, in the Northumberland County, Pennsylvania. Growing up in this area helped Czury identify strongly with the coal region. When Czury was seven-years-old, the Susquehanna River flooded the Knox Anthracite Coal Mine in Luzerne County, the Knox Mine disaster, which killed 12 miners and left thousands of others out of work. The disaster crippled the economic foundation of the area. Loss, abandonment, displacement and leaving would become major themes in his poetry. After he graduated from Dallas High School in Dallas, Pennsylvania, Czury drifted between several colleges and various temporary jobs across the United States. He spent 15 years hitchhiking across the country, working temporarily in carnivals, warehouses, and kitchens. He attended Hiram Scott College and Western Nebraska Community College, both in Scottsbluff, Nebraska. Czury then moved to the University of Montana in Missoula, before attending Wilkes University in Wilkes-Barre, Pennsylvania.

== Poetry ==
Czury published his first book of poetry entitled Janus Peeking in 1980. The book received the 1980 First Book Award from the Montana Arts Council. From there, Czury went on to publish 15 more collections of poetry. Czury's work illustrates the pain and emptiness of the depression-stricken Pennsylvania coal-mining region. The following is an excerpt from his poem entitled, “Coalscape:”

all this black dust / black cinder and glass ground up / in the spine of a torn-out trainbed / smoke rising out of birch on the culm bank / when it begins to rain

One of his most notable collections is God's Shiny Glass Eye, published in 1987. This collection revolved around Czury's vision of the coal country where he grew up. Critic Michael Basinski is quoted on the FootHills Publishing site as saying, “The poet’s imagination and the anthracite world intimately merge to produce a poetry that is poignantly barren and stripped of any artificial embellishment. It is an angry poetry, but its passion is restrained and boils beneath the structure of the book.”

Much of Czury's work has been spread internationally. His books of poetry have been translated into many different languages, including Spanish, Russian, Portuguese, and Italian. Czury has been a featured poet at the International Poetry Festivals in Argentina, Ireland, Croatia, Colombia, Lithuania, and Macedonia.

Czury currently lives in Springville, Pennsylvania. He has worked as a travelling poet in schools, homeless shelters, prisons, mental hospitals, and community centers around the world. He is the editor of the Old School Press Poetry Pamphlet Series, and conducts life-writing and poetry workshops at the Springville Schoolhouse Artist Studios, where he lives, "writes and plays harmonica".

== Bibliography ==
- JANUS PEEKING, Calleopea Press, 1980, Santa Rosa, California
- AGAINST THE BLACK WIND, Two Magpie Press, 1981, Kendrick
- GOD'S SHINY GLASS EYE, Great Elm Press, Rexville, N.Y., 1987
- HACKING AND SMOKING, FootHills Publishing, 1989, Bath, N.Y.
- EXCEPT..., FootHills Publishing, 1990, Bath, N.Y.
- OBIT HOTEL, Pine Press, 1993, Landisburg, Pa.
- SCRAPPLE, Nightshade Press, 1995, Troy, Me.
- SHADOW/ORPHAN SHADOW — SOMBRA/SOMBRA HUÉRFANA,(translated into Castilian Spanish by Rosann DeCandido and Alicia Partnoy) Pine Press, 1997, Landisburg, Pa.
- UNRECONCILED FACES, FootHills Publishing, 1999, Bath, N.Y.
- PARALLEL ́NOYE TECHNIE/ PARALLEL RIVERTIME, (translated into Russian by Irina Mashinskaia) Petropol Press, 1999, St. Petersburg, Russia
- CLOSING OUT, FootHills Publishing, 2000, Bath, N.Y.
- FACES IRRECONCILIÁVEIS / UNRECONCILED FACES, (translated into Portuguese by Narlan Matos) Red Pagoda Press, 2002, Reading, Pa.
- ANGLIAVAIZDIS / COALSCAPE, (translated into Lithuanian by Mariaus Buroko) Vario Burnos, 2002, Vilnius, Lithuania
- IN MY SILENCE TO JUSTIFY, FootHills Publishing, 2003, Bath, N.Y.
- TECNOLOGÍA NORTEAMERICANA – PATENTE EN TRÁMITE – Y OTROS POEMAS / AMERICAN KNOW-HOW – PATENT PENDING – AND OTHER POEMS, (translated into Spanish by Esteban Moore) PapelTinta Ediciones. 2003, Buenos Aires, Argentina
- IN ATTESA DI BREVETTO / AMERICAN KNOW-HOW, (translated into Italian by Riccardo Duranti, illustrations by Dino Patanè) Edizioni Empirìa, 2003, Rome, Italy
- GOD'S SHINY GLASS EYE, FootHills Publishing, 2004, Bath, N.Y.
- DNEVNIK BEZ IMENA / DIARY WITHOUT NAMES, (translated into Croatian by Milos Durdevic) Literature Live, 2004, Zagreb, Croatia
- KAM FRIKÊ TA THEM / I’M AFRAID TO SAY, (translated into Albanian by SilkeLiria Blumbach) International Literary Manifestation, 2006, Tetova, Macedonia
- AMERICAN KNOW-HOW: Patent Pending, Paper Kite Press, 2006, Wilkes-Barre, Pa.
- KITCHEN OF CONFLICT RESOLUTION, FootHills Publishing, 2009, Bath, N.Y.
- THUMBNOTES ALMANAC, FootHills Publishing, 2015, Bath, N.Y.
