= Gene Field Foster =

Anthropologist Ornithologist Artist (1894–1979)

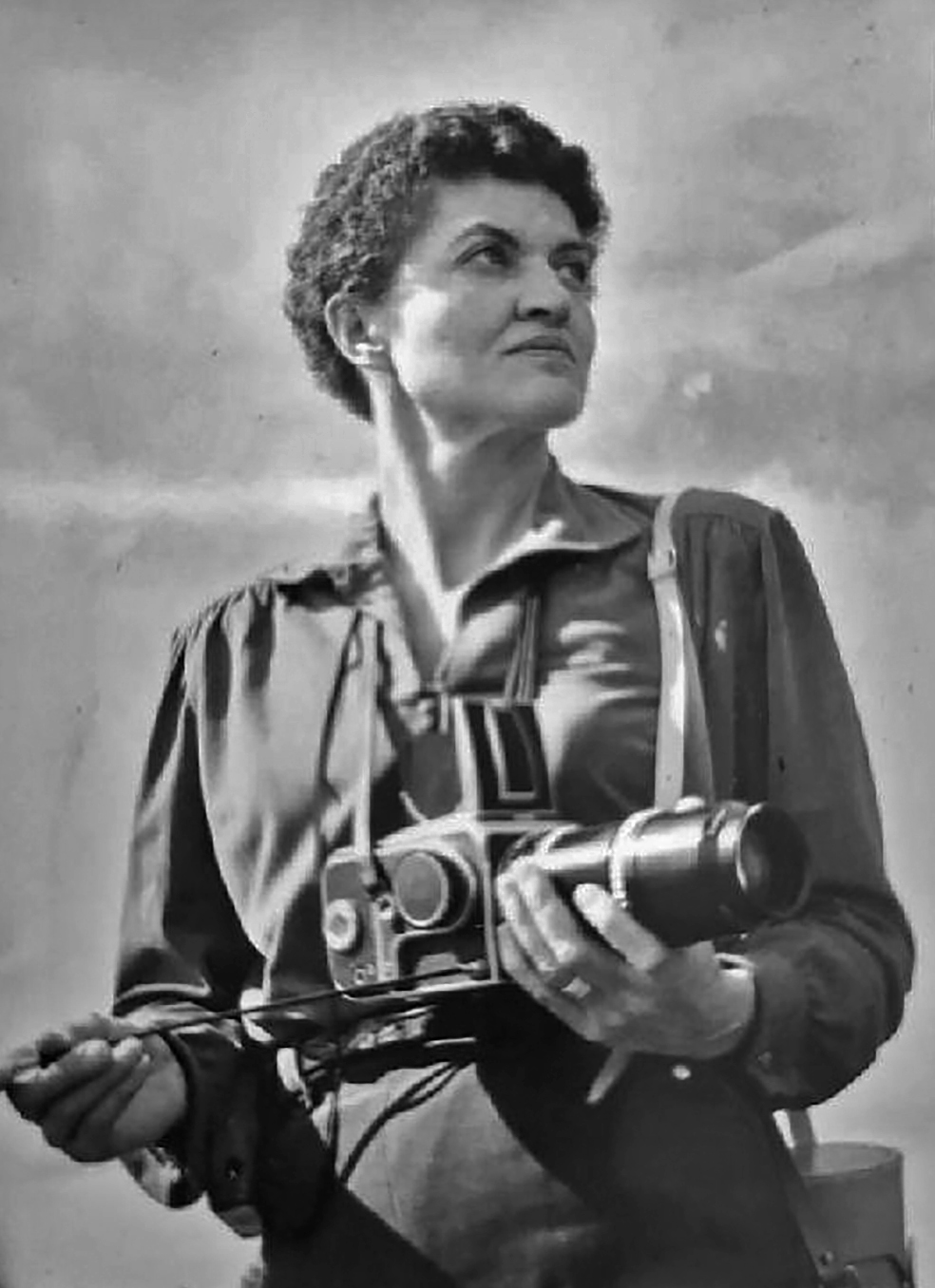
- Born: Gene Field Foster; January 17, 1917; Tomahawk, Wisconsin
- Died: February 24, 1983 (aged 66); Flagstaff, Arizona
- Resting place: Tomahawk, Wisconsin
- Occupations: River runner, artist, carpenter, anthropologist, ornithologist
- Spouse: Katharine Bartlett
- Relatives: Eugene Field

Notes
- Gene Foster's nephew David Foster assisted with photographic and background information.

Gene Field Foster (January 17, 1917 - February 24, 1983) was an American carpenter, artist, anthropologist, ornithologist, and early Glen Canyon river runner.

== Early life ==
Gene Field Foster was born in Tomahawk, Wisconsin to Elmer David and Ruth Gray (Field) Foster. Foster was named for her mother's father, poet and journalist Eugene Field and Ruth Foster chose the masculine spelling for her daughter’s name.

Foster’s father served in World War I and on his return to civilian life he operated Foster Lumber Company and taught his daughter carpentry. Foster attended the School of the Art Institute of Chicago and then moved to New York City where she made drawings for ad agencies before she established her own business. During this time she studied photography. In World War II Foster worked in a Connecticut munitions plant where she developed pneumonia. Doctors advised her to go west to regain her health. Foster moved to Prescott, Arizona in 1946. She purchased some land and built a house while supporting herself working as a carpenter. In 1949, Foster moved to Sedona, Arizona and opened her own carpentry company, Foster Wood Shop.

== Explorations ==
In 1950, Foster was asked by Sedona resident Elmer Purtyman to help with the shuttle for a river trip through Glen Canyon on the Colorado River. When Purtyman showed her film of the river trip she determined to photograph the natural beauty of Glen Canyon. In November 1952, Foster joined Purtyman and other artists, including Max Ernst and Dorothea Tanning, on a 14 day river trip through Glen Canyon. Additional river runners they met on that trip included Batman artist Dick Sprang.

Flagstaff’s Museum of Northern Arizona founders Harold and Mary-Russell Ferrell Colton, along with Museum anthropologist Katharine Bartlett, hired Foster to build picture frames in 1951. Foster and Bartlett developed a personal and professional relationship, purchasing a lot in Flagstaff, Arizona together where Foster built a small home. The house had light for painting and a large storage area for her Glen Canyon equipment.

The Bureau of Reclamation identified a dam-site in lower Glen Canyon in 1921. The reservoir created by the dam would inundate countless archeological sites documenting thousands of years of indigenous occupation of Glen Canyon. Glen Canyon lacked extensive archeological exploration. Foster began to photograph and sketch sites along the Colorado River and in the side canyons of Glen Canyon during her first Glen Canyon river trip in the spring 1952. She wrote a paper on her findings in Glen Canyon that included sketches of petroglyphs and habitation sites. In her summary published in the Museum's Plateau Magazine of October 1952, she wrote: “That this incredibly lovely, unspoiled and almost entirely unexplored canyon country – a wilderness frontier for many kinds of scientific inquiry – would be flooded and destroyed was a sickening prospect.”

The Bureau of Reclamation received funding for the construction of Glen Canyon Dam in 1956. Foster’s publications contributed to the decision to explore and document Glen Canyon archeology in a project supported by the Museum of Northern Arizona. The Bureau of Reclamation channeled funds to the National Park Service for the project. Foster received a contract to record archaeological sites on the left bank of the Colorado River between the confluence of the San Juan River and Navajo Canyon, a distance of 52 miles. Foster and Bartlet concentrated on the assigned area recording sites in this area before they were flooded.

Foster oversaw three river trips in Glen Canyon between April and October 1957 with a volunteer crew that included Bartlett, research associate David M. Brugge, and Flagstaff resident Guy Wilson. When the NPS Glen Canyon Project got underway, however, Foster was not involved in the Museum’s fieldwork and her manuscript based on the 1957 fieldwork remains unpublished.

== Later life ==
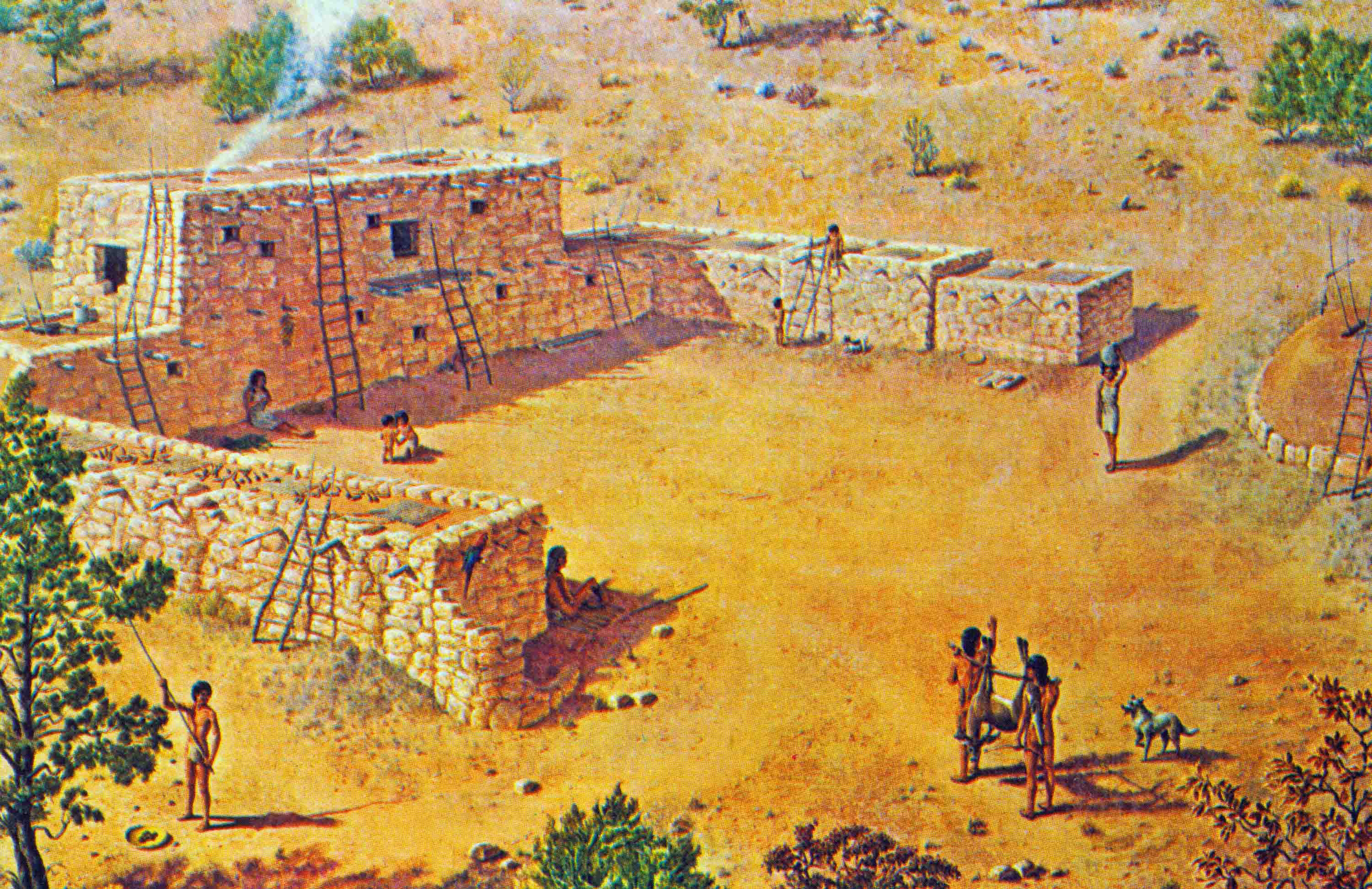
Gene Foster's rendition of the Tusayan Pueblo.

In the early 1960s, Grand Canyon National Park hired Foster to create a painting of the Tusayan Ruins for a museum exhibit. Her large tempura canvas was displayed in a small museum adjacent to the Pueblo.

In the 1960s and 1970s Foster studied the Northern Arizona Pinyon jay population. She set up a feeding station in her backyard in Flagstaff and instituted a banding program, hiring neighborhood highschool students to document the behavior of the birds. She worked closely with graduate students at Northern Arizona University, helping them with research for their theses and dissertations pertaining to the Pinyon jay.

In later years, Foster experienced extreme mood swings. Her physical health never fully recovered from pneumonia, and she was a lifelong smoker. She died in 1983 at the age of 66 in Flagstaff and is buried in Tomahawk, Wisconsin.

== Legacy ==
The Gene Field Foster Papers, including her unpublished manuscript and over 500 photographs of Glen Canyon, are preserved at the Museum of Northern Arizona archives in Flagstaff, Arizona.
