= Aaron Kaufer =

American politician

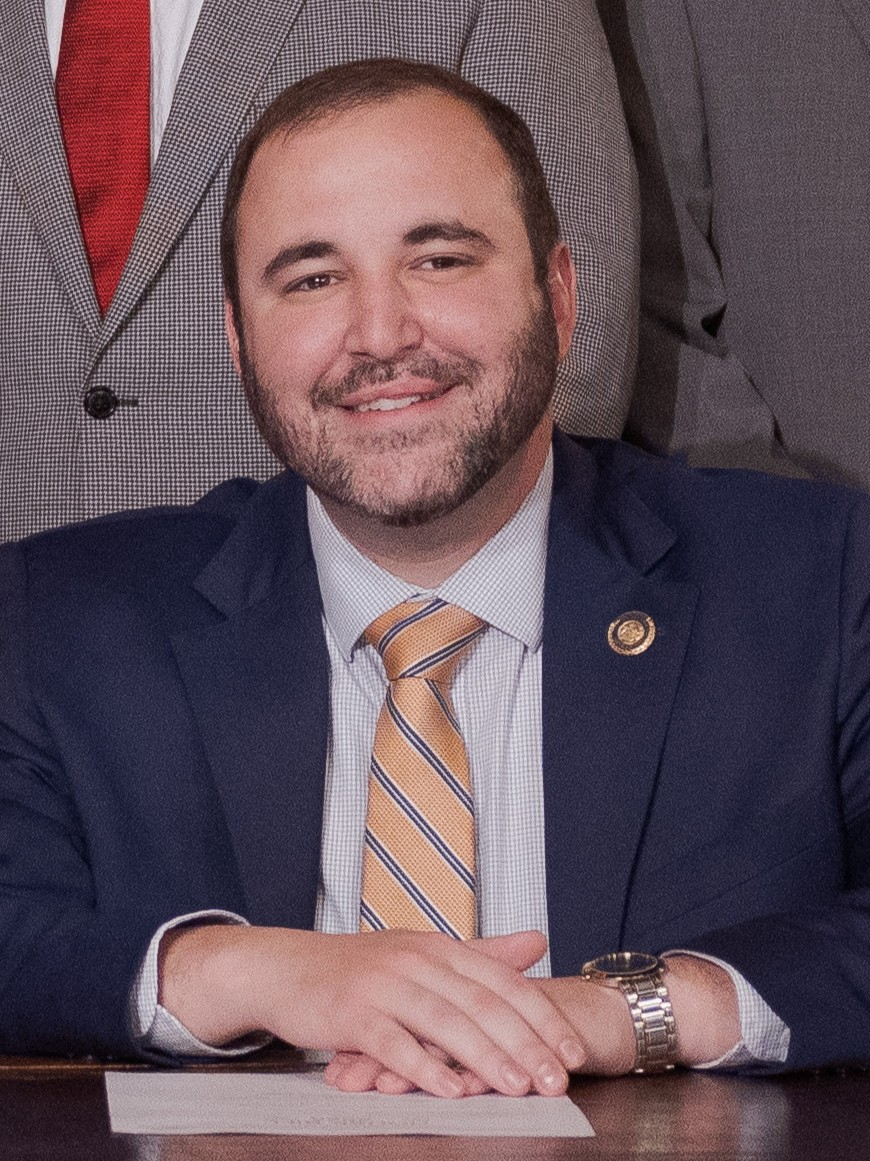
- Kaufer in 2022

Member of the Pennsylvania House of Representatives from the 120th district
- In office January 6, 2015 – November 30, 2024
- Preceded by: Phyllis Mundy
- Succeeded by: Brenda Pugh

Personal details
- Born: July 11, 1988 (age 38) Kingston, Pennsylvania, U.S.
- Party: Republican
- Spouse: Annie
- Children: 1
- Education: Lafayette College (BA); Widener University Commonwealth Law School (J.D.)
- Alma mater: Wyoming Valley West High School
- Website: www.repkaufer.com

Aaron D. Kaufer (born July 11, 1988) is an American politician who served as a Republican member of the Pennsylvania House of Representatives, representing the 120th district from 2015 to 2024.

== Early life and education ==
Kaufer was born on July 11, 1988, in Kingston, Pennsylvania, the son of Neil and Larinda Kaufer. He graduated from Wyoming Valley West High School in 2007 and earned dual Bachelor of Arts degrees in government and law and international affairs from Lafayette College in 2011. In 2020, Kaufer earned a Juris Doctor degree from Widener University Commonwealth Law School.

== Political career ==
Kaufer first ran for state representative in 2012 against incumbent Democrat Phyllis Mundy, losing 56% to 43%. In December 2013, Mundy announced that she would be retiring. For the 2014 election, Eileen Cipriani was chosen as the Democratic nominee. Kaufer ran against Cipriani as a reform-minded candidate with bipartisan support, defeating her with 56% of the vote. He was reelected in 2016 with 68% of the vote against Democrat Robert McDonald. Kaufer was reelected for a third term in 2018 unopposed. He again won reelection to a fourth term in 2020, defeating Democrat Joanna Bryn Smith 63% to 37%. Kaufer defeated Democrat Fern Leard in the 2022 election by a similar margin. In 2024, Kaufer announced he would not seek reelection.

For the 2015-2016 legislative session, Kaufer was named the deputy chairman of the State House Majority Policy Committee. In 2023, Kaufer was named the top Republican on the House Government Oversight Committee.

Kaufer was a co-founder of the PA HOPE (Heroin, Opioid, Prevention and Education) Caucus as part of his effort to improve Pennsylvania's drug and alcohol services.

== Political positions ==
Kaufer believes in a smaller state government and has focused on pursuing job and economic development initiatives. He also supports efforts to address the opioid epidemic.

Kaufer is known for his commitment on bipartisan cooperation; he often wears an orange tie as a symbol of his bipartisanship. He considers late U.S. Senator John McCain as his political inspiration. Kaufer worked on McCain's 2008 presidential campaign in New Hampshire and admired the senator's bipartisanship. Spotlight PA referred to Kaufer as a "moderate Republican."

=== 2020 presidential election ===
Kaufer and 69 other Pennsylvania legislators signed an amicus brief in the case Texas v. Pennsylvania, which challenged the 2020 United States presidential election results in Pennsylvania and three other states won by President-elect Joe Biden. He defended the brief saying it was only to provide background information on changes made to Pennsylvania's election operations, "It did not seek to take sides in the decision, nor did it seek to overturn the election."

Following the election, Kaufer said his name was erroneously added to a letter signed by Pennsylvania legislators urging Congress to reject Pennsylvania's electoral votes. His name was later removed from the final version of the letter. Kaufer said he agreed with U.S. Attorney General Bill Barr's assessment that no major irregularities occurred to alter the election results. When asked in 2022, Kaufer said he accepted the results of the election.

=== Abortion ===
According to Kaufer himself, he has never supported an outright ban on abortion and believes in exceptions for rape, incest, health of the mother, and viability of the child. He supports moving the threshold for abortions in Pennsylvania from 24 weeks into a pregnancy to 20 weeks. He was absent from a vote in the State House on a constitutional amendment that stated, "there is no right to abortion or funding for an abortion" in Pennsylvania. Kaufer later said he would have voted against the amendment.

=== Cryptocurrency ===
In October 2024, Kaufer voted for a bill that codified the ability of individuals and business to keep assets in cryptocurrency. Following the bill's passage, Kaufer and Representative Mike Cabell introduced another bill that would allow the state treasurer to invest 10% of Pennsylvania's funds in cryptocurrency.

=== Election reform ===
In 2016, Kaufer voiced support for nonpartisan elections where candidates were not affiliated with political parties and primary election were open to all voters regardless of affiliation.

In 2024, Kaufer signed a discharge petition that would force a vote in the State House on a proposed amendment to the Pennsylvania Constitution that would require voter ID. He previously called since-repealed voter ID laws a bad idea during a 2012 forum, but left open the possibility of supporting something similar.

=== Gambling ===
Kaufer believes that online gambling should not be tied to a credit card. Prior to being elected, Kaufer worked at Mohegan Sun Pocono where he would see customers repeatedly taking out, often large, sums of money on their credit card "just so they could play one more game." In 2016, Kaufer expressed his opposition to online gambling, but supported legalized digital poker.

=== Israel-Palestine ===
Following Ben & Jerry's 2021 announcement that the company would not longer sell its ice cream in the Israeli occupied West Bank, Kaufer called for the enforcement of 2016 Act 163, which says the state will not associate with businesses that boycott Israel.

Kaufer has said the Boycott, Divestment and Sanctions movement (BDS) is "little more than a poorly hidden anti-Semitic economic attack." He has also labeled the slogan "from the river to the sea" as antisemitic.

Following the October 7 Hamas attack on Israel, Kaufer co-sponsored a resolution in the State House that declared the House "stand[s] with Israel as it defends itself against the barbaric war launched by Hamas." The resolution passed unanimously.

After three university presidents sidestepped questions about the acceptability of calls for the genocide of Jewish people during a Congressional hearing, Kaufer denounced their answers and promoted a package of bills introduced by other lawmakers that would promote Holocaust education and combat antisemitism on college campuses.

=== Legislative reform ===
Leading up to the 2014 Pennsylvania state house election, Kaufer campaigned as a supporter of term limits stating he would only serve four terms. In 2022, however, Kaufer ran for a fifth term. When asked why he seemingly abandoned his pledge to only serve four terms, Kaufer said it was conditional on if he could get term limits passed. He also listed his seniority in the State House as a reason to keep his seat. Kaufer previously criticized the legislature's seniority system as "broken" in 2016.

In 2014, Kaufer pledged not to accept a state pension, pay raise, or per diems. He has called for scrapping per diems and automatic pay raises for legislators. In 2012, Kaufer deemed the current salary of $78,000 for members of the legislature too much. He has also supported a ban on gifts to lawmakers and voted to reduce the size of the legislature. In 2017, Kaufer cosponsored legislation that called for a constitution convention to review and possibly reduce the size of the Pennsylvania legislature.

In 2012, Kaufer slammed Republicans in the state legislature for making more partisan districts in the recent redistricting cycle that stifled competitive elections. He backed efforts to remove the influence of the state legislature in redistricting and instead institute some form of independent redistricting commission. Kaufer opposed a 2021 decision by Pennsylvania's Legislative Reapportionment Commission that changed how state prison inmates were counted with respect to state-level legislative districts. The change meant that state inmates would count towards the districts they lived in prior to incarceration and not where they were currently imprisoned. Kaufer opposed it on the basis it would almost exclusively benefit Democratic representation and hurt Republicans.

=== LGBTQ+ issues ===
In 2023, Kaufer and Representative Alec Ryncavage were the only two Republicans in the State House who voted for the passage of an LGBTQ+ anti-discrimination bill. Kaufer defended his support for the bill by saying it would serve to deter more "radical" measures. Kaufer previously voiced his support for similar legislation in 2016 and stated, "Gay rights are human rights" at a candidate's forum that year. His brother is a member of the LGBTQ+ community.

=== Marijuana ===
Kaufer believes that decriminalizing marijuana would aid law enforcement in prioritizing the seizure of opioids and fentanyl, something he describes as "larger priorities." He also thinks that prohibition of marijuana is not an effective policy and supported the legalization of medical marijuana in Pennsylvania. In 2023, Kaufer co-sponsored legislation to permit medical marijuana users the ability to legally drive in Pennsylvania. The following year, Kaufer and Representative Emily Kinkead co-sponsored legislation that would legalize recreation marijuana and institute a regulatory system they said would eliminate the illicit marijuana trade. The bill would have allowed anyone over age 21 to buy marijuana for recreational or medical use and created a fund to provide low or zero-interest rate loans to rural, minority, female, and veteran-owned marijuana businesses. It was referred, but never advanced by the State House's health committee.

=== Taxation ===
Kaufer supports the elimination of property taxes. In 2016, Kaufer voiced support for a proposal to eliminate property tax and instead raise sales and income taxes to account for the lost revenue. During his first term as a state representative, Kaufer supported a homestead exemption so that property tax would be eliminated on a person's primary residence.

In 2023, Kaufer was among a group of Republicans who signed onto several bills meant to give tax breaks to families in areas such as child care, school supplies, and home improvement.

=== Welfare reform ===
Kaufer believes in reforming what he describes as Pennsylvania's "bloated welfare system" and opposes the state supporting what he calls "welfare lifestyles." The first piece of legislation Kaufer proposed in the State House was a law that barred individuals in Pennsylvania from accepting welfare from multiple states.

== Personal life ==
Kaufer is Jewish. He is married to his wife Annie; they have one daughter. He resides in Kingston, Pennsylvania.

In 2019, Kaufer visited Poland, where he viewed the graves of relatives who were victims of the Holocaust.

== Electoral history ==
2012 Pennsylvania House of Representatives election, District 120
Party	Candidate	Votes	%
Democratic	Phyllis Mundy (incumbent)	14,133	56.05
Republican	Aaron Kaufer	11,050	43.82
Write-in		31	0.12
Total votes		25,214	100.00

2014 Pennsylvania House of Representatives election, District 120
Party	Candidate	Votes	%
Republican	Aaron Kaufer	9,514	55.92
Democratic	Eileen Cipriani	7,472	43.92
Write-in		28	0.16
Total votes		17,014	100.00

2016 Pennsylvania House of Representatives election, District 120
Party	Candidate	Votes	%
Republican	Aaron Kaufer (incumbent)	18,843	67.80
Democratic	Robert J. McDonald	8,929	32.13
Write-in		20	0.07
Total votes		27,792	100.00

2018 Pennsylvania House of Representatives election, District 120
Party	Candidate	Votes	%
Republican	Aaron Kaufer (incumbent)	16,677	96.04
Write-in		688	3.96
Total votes		17,365	100.00

2020 Pennsylvania House of Representatives election, District 120
Party	Candidate	Votes	%
Republican	Aaron Kaufer (incumbent)	20,397	63.10
Democratic	Joanna Bryn Smith	11,913	36.85
	Scattered	16	0.05
Total votes		32,326	100.00

2022 Pennsylvania House of Representatives Democratic primary election, District 120
Party	Candidate	Votes	%
Write-In	Fern Leard	590	46.06
Write-In	Aaron Kaufer	418	32.63
	Other write-in candidates	273	21.31
Total votes		1,281	100.00

2022 Pennsylvania House of Representatives election, District 120
Party	Candidate	Votes	%
Republican	Aaron Kaufer (incumbent)	17,548	65.97
Democratic	Fern Leard	9,014	33.89
	SCATTER	38	0.14
Total votes		26,600	100.00
