= Katharine Bartlett =

American physical anthropologist (1907–2001)

- Born: November 30, 1907; Denver, Colorado
- Died: May 22, 2001 (aged 93); Sedona, Arizona
- Occupations: physical anthropologist, museum curator
- Years active: 1930–1981
- Known for: organizing the holdings of the Museum of Northern Arizona

Katharine Bartlett (1907–2001) was an American physical anthropologist who worked from 1930 to 1952 as the first curator of the Museum of Northern Arizona, cataloging and organizing the museum's holdings, and then as the museum's librarian until 1974 and archivist until 1981. She participated in a survey of the Navajo Nation's reservation in the Little Colorado River basin and established the cataloging system used by the Glen Canyon Archaeological Project. She was a Fellow of the American Association for the Advancement of Science, a Fellow of the American Anthropological Association and a Fellow of the Society of American Archaeology, as well as the first Fellow of the MNA. Honored in an exhibit of the Smithsonian Institution in 1986 and a recipient of the 1991 Sharlot Hall Award for her contributions to Arizona history, she was posthumously inducted into the Arizona Women's Hall of Fame in 2008.

== Biography ==
Katharine Bartlett was born on November 30, 1907, in Denver, Colorado, to Louise Erina (née Leedom) and George Frederick Bartlett. Unable to afford her first choice of Smith College, Bartlett obtained her master's degree in physical anthropology from the University of Denver, studying under Etienne Bernardeau Renaud. In 1930, she took a summer position to assist with the Hopi Craftsman Exhibition of the Museum of Northern Arizona (MNA). At the invitation of Harold Sellers Colton, who at the time was the preeminent expert in Southwestern US archaeological and ethnological research, Bartlett stayed on in Arizona to organize the two-year-old MNA, which Colton and his wife had founded.

Bartlett organized, cataloged, and preserved the museum's anthropology collection, serving from 1930 to 1952 as the museum curator. In 1931, she and Colton made an archaeological survey of the Navajo Reservation covering 250 miles of the reservation that lies in the Little Colorado River basin. They plotted 260 archaeological sites in their survey, and her work on the artifacts from the gravel beds near Tolchaco was some of the earliest work on the Paleo-Indian groups in the area. In 1935, she was honored as one of the first four women elected as Fellows of the Society for American Archaeology. Her work on Paleo-Indians presented at the 1946 Pecos Conference correctly showed that previous work by Frank Roberts indicating a break between Folsom tradition and later cultures was erroneous. In 1952, when Gene Field Foster, Bartlett's housemate, began recording archaeological sites in the area where the Glen Canyon Dam was being built, she invited Bartlett and the MNA to participate. Bartlett established the catalog system for the archaeological collection of the Glen Canyon Project which was the largest project sponsored through the Interagency Archeological Salvage Program (IASP) in the Santa Fe Regional Office of the National Park Service. The surveying in Glen Canyon continued for more than five years.

Beginning in 1928, Bartlett published numerous articles on the Native people and cultures of Arizona. Her scientific papers included such topics as ancient mines, artifacts, foods, history, prehistoric tools, as well as crafts of the Hopi, Navajo, and other Arizona tribes. Her article Pueblo Milling Stones of the Flagstaff Region and Their Relation to Others in the Southwest: A Study in Progressive Efficiency "has become a standard reference on groundstone food-processing technology," according to the Society for American Archaeology. From 1953 until 1974, she served as the Librarian of the MNA and collected thousands of volumes to create a comprehensive research facility in northern Arizona. From 1974 until her retirement in 1981, she filled the role of museum archivist.

Bartlett was a charter member of the Arizona Academy of Science and the Arizona Association of University Women. She was a Fellow of the American Association for the Advancement of Science, of the American Anthropological Association, and the first Fellow of the MNA. She was honored by an exhibit that appeared at the Smithsonian in 1986, entitled “Daughter of the Desert” and a 1991 recipient of the Sharlot Hall Award for her contributions to Arizona history. Bartlet retired in 1981 to care for her housemate Foster, who died in 1983, but continued working at museum as a volunteer until 1990.

Bartlett died on May 22, 2001, in Sedona, Arizona, and was posthumously inducted into the Arizona Women's Hall of Fame in 2008.

== Sources ==
- Banks, Kimball M; Czaplicki, Jon S (2014). Dam Projects and the Growth of American Archaeology: The River Basin Surveys and the Interagency Archeological Salvage Program. Walnut Creek, California: Left Coast Press. ISBN 978-1-61132-174-6.
- Browman, David L. (2013). Cultural Negotiations: The Role of Women in the Founding of Americanist Archaeology. Lincoln, Nebraska: University of Nebraska Press. ISBN 978-0-8032-4547-1.
