= Phyllis Mundy =

American politician

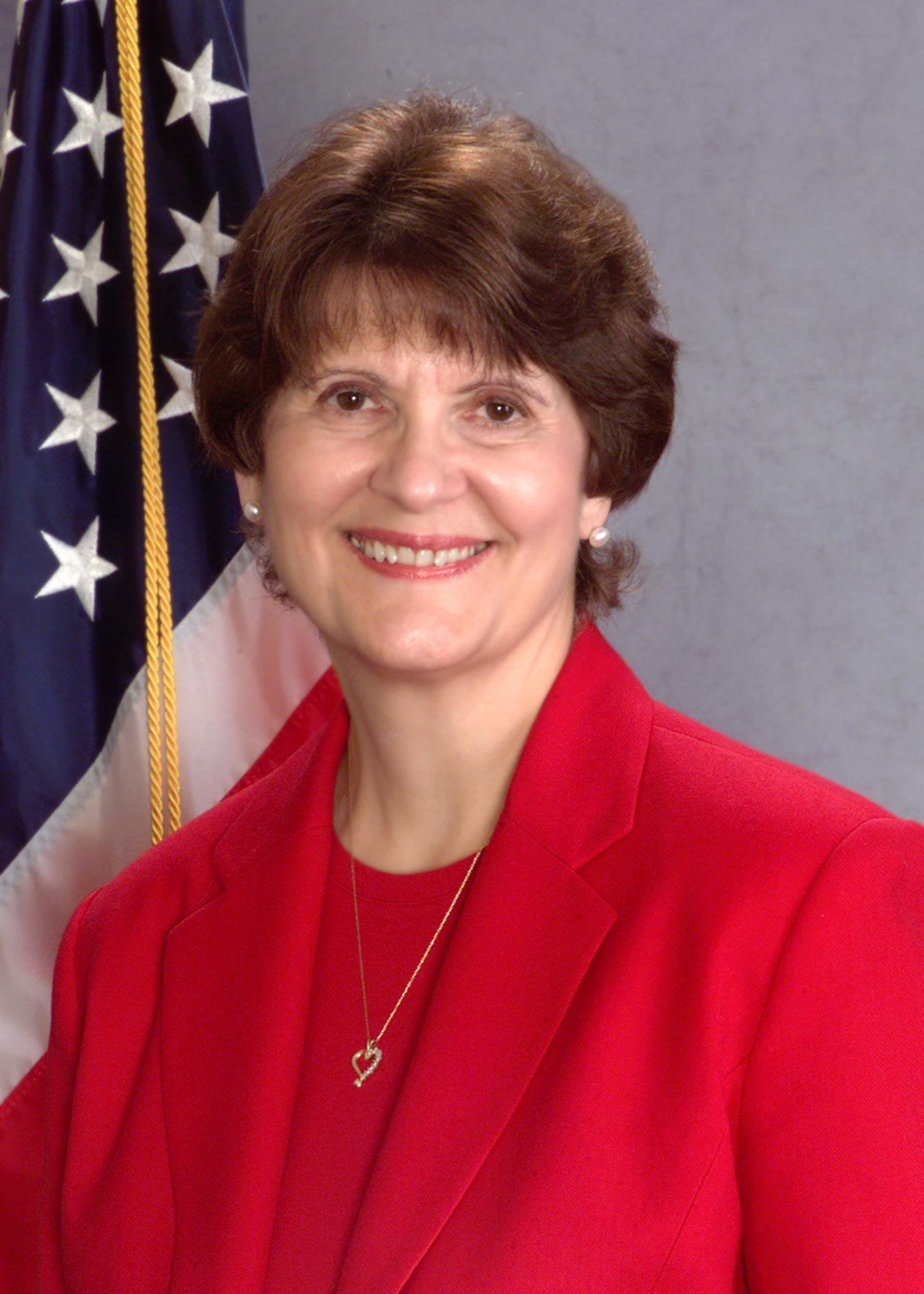

Member of the Pennsylvania House of Representatives from the 120th district
- In office January 1, 1991 – November 30, 2014
- Preceded by: Scott Dietterick
- Succeeded by: Aaron Kaufer

Personal details
- Born: January 31, 1948 (age 78) Evansville, Indiana
- Party: Democratic
- Spouse: Divorced
- Children: Brian Mundy
- Education: Bloomsburg University
- Occupation: Teacher, business manager, community leader
- Website: www.phyllismundy.com

Phyllis Mundy (born January 31, 1948) is a former Democratic member of the Pennsylvania House of Representatives and former minority chairman of the House Finance Committee.

== Biography ==
She is a graduate of Kingston High School and Bloomsburg University. Prior to her time in the State House, she was a French teacher and later, the manager of a multimillion dollar manufacturing facility. She was heavily involved with the Junior League, was President of the Wilkes-Barre chapter of the League of Women Voters, and served on the Luzerne County Property tax reform commission. A current and longtime resident of Kingston, Pennsylvania, Mundy represented the 120th legislative district of her state from 1991 to 2014. Given that the district, at the time, was 60 percent Republican, Mundy's landslide victory was considered a political upset, as was her enormous reelection victory in 1992.

In her 24-year service as a member of the General Assembly in Harrisburg, Mundy was a vehement supporter of environmental protection laws and state programs to boost early childhood education. She earned high ratings from the Sierra Club, an environmental advocacy group that gave Mundy a 100% rating recently, and AFL-CIO, which consistently gave Mundy high marks for her support of working families.

In her career, Mundy's signature policy achievements included leading successful efforts to pass bills that expanded care for senior citizens, improved the rights of foster children, provided stronger home visitation services for low-income expectant mothers, boosted pre-K education, cut property taxes, and expanded prescription drug coverage for seniors.

At home in the Kingston area, Mundy enjoyed broad popular support among voters of both parties in her district. Indeed, in two cases, she had no Republican opponent in reelection campaigns, including in 2004 and 2008. Her exceptional constituent service, constant visits in her district to attend local events and festivals, and her close ties to thousands of voters all contributed to her huge personal popularity. In addition to such attributes, Mundy's policy positions and votes were generally smiled upon by voters in her district. Most notably, her successful effort in 2005 to stop health care cost hikes at Blue Cross Blue Shield for residents of her district and her 2010 proposal for a one-year ban on new Marcellus Shale drilling permits both earned her widespread approval. Nonetheless, it is evident that one political reality aided Mundy in particular: her district became more compact and contiguous and thus increasingly Democratic in voter registration in her last decade in office, reaching 56 percent by 2012. Also, her hometown of Kingston, once heavily Republican, became mostly Democratic during the late 2000s.

Mundy's popularity translated into large election victories when she had a Republican opponent. Indeed, in 2000, 2002, and 2006, Mundy won 64 percent, 65 percent, and 75 percent of the vote, respectively.

Mundy easily won reelection in her last campaign in November 2012 by a 56% to 44% margin. On December 2, 2013, Mundy announced she would not run for reelection to a 13th term in the 2014 elections and that she would retire at the end of her term on November 30, 2014.

In retirement Mundy serves on the Boards of Maternal and Family Health Services (Secretary), Luzerne County Head Start, Area Agency on Aging of Luzerne/Wyoming Counties (Chairman), Anthracite Scenic Trails Assn. (ASTA) and the Vestry of St. Stephen's Episcopal Church where she serves as Stewardship Chair. She was also appointed by Governor Tom Wolf to serve on the Early Learning Investment Commission and the Governor's Office of Administration Advisory Board. Most recently Mundy became a CASA (Court Appointed Special Advocate) for foster or care dependent children. Her greatest pleasure in retirement is spending time with her son Brian, daughter-in-law April and grandsons Mason and Bryce.
