= Kingston, Pennsylvania =

Borough in Pennsylvania, US

- Borough
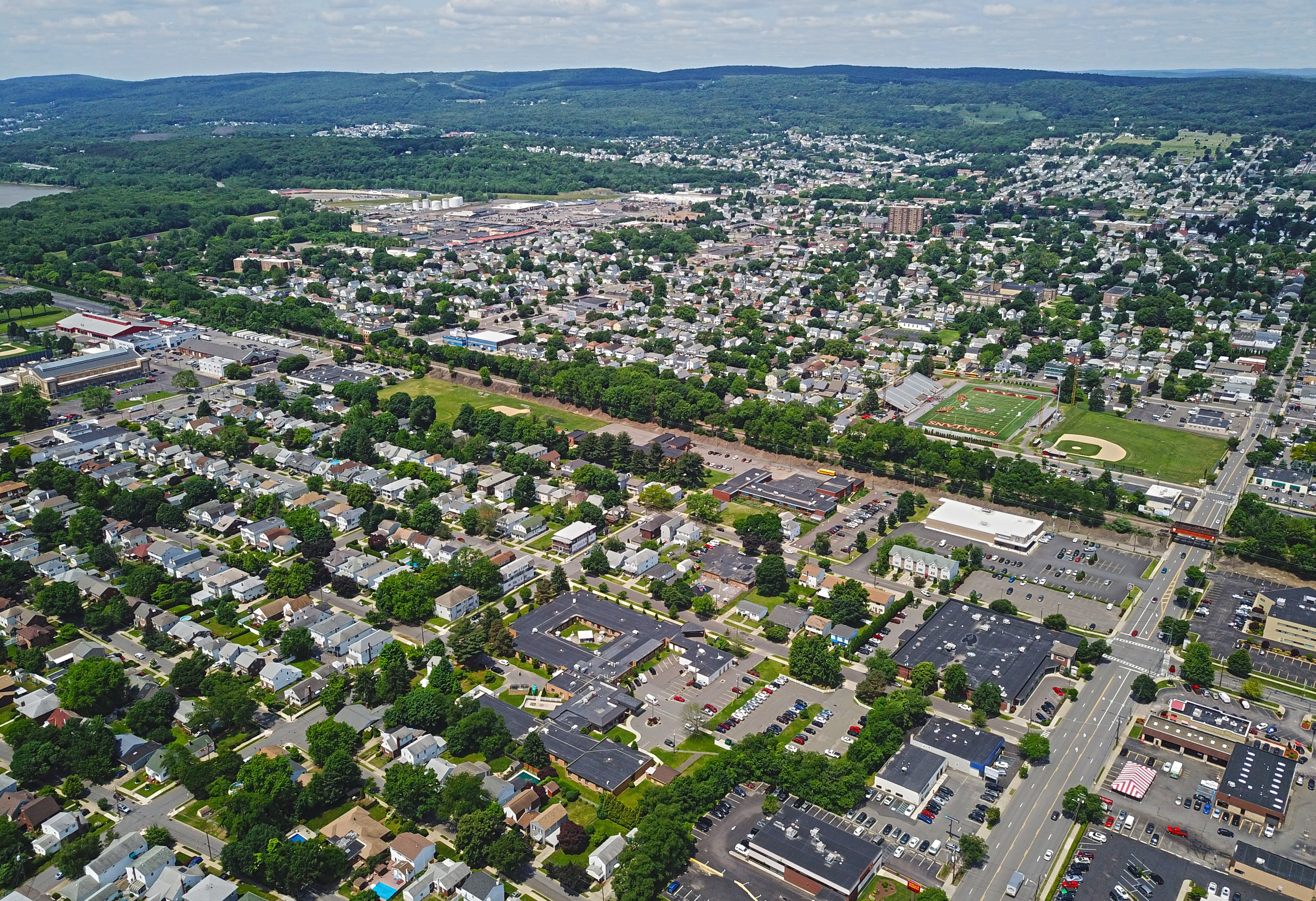
- Aerial view of Kingston

- Logo
- Motto: "A Great Place to Call Home"
- Location of Kingston in Luzerne County, Pennsylvania.

- Location within Pennsylvania Location within the United States
- Coordinates: 41°16′N 75°53′W
- Country: United States
- State: Pennsylvania
- County: Luzerne
- Settled: 1771
- Incorporated: 1857

Government
  - Type: Home rule (strong executive/appointed manager)
  - Mayor: Jeffrey R. Coslett (D)

Area
  - Total: 2.20 sq mi (5.71 km^{2})
  - Land: 2.15 sq mi (5.56 km^{2})
  - Water: 0.062 sq mi (0.16 km^{2})
- Elevation: 545 ft (166 m)

Population (2020)
  - Total: 13,349
  - Density: 6,219.3/sq mi (2,401.29/km^{2})
- Time zone: UTC-5 (Eastern (EST))
  - Summer (DST): UTC-4 (EDT)
- Zip Code: 18704
- Area code: 570
- FIPS code: 42-39784
- Website: kingstonpa.org

Kingston is a borough in Luzerne County, Pennsylvania, United States. It is located on the western bank of the Susquehanna River opposite Wilkes-Barre. Kingston was first settled in the early 1770s, and incorporated as a borough in 1857. As of the 2020 census, the population was 13,349, making it the most populous borough in Luzerne County.

== History ==
=== Early history ===
In the early 1660s, King Charles II owed Admiral Sir William Penn a large sum of money. To settle this debt, he granted Penn's son, William, a territory in North America, which later became known as Pennsylvania. However, Connecticut also claimed a portion of this land.

Count Zinzendorf was one of the first people to take an interest in the Wyoming Valley. In 1742, he came to the region to convert the Native Americans to Christianity. At the time, the valley was inhabited by several Native American tribes (including the Susquehannock and the Delaware).

His reports led a group of Connecticut settlers to form the Connecticut Susquehanna Company. This company bought the land from the natives. In 1768, they met in Hartford, Connecticut, and decided to survey and divide the territory into five townships (each one was five square miles). The plan was to sell and divide each township among forty settlers. The first forty pioneers took possession of Kingston Township.

By the late 1760s, both Connecticut and Pennsylvania settlers fought over this territory. The conflict was eventually settled in the 1780s. The disputed land was granted to Pennsylvania. The location of modern-day Kingston became part of Northumberland County. However, Connecticut settlers remained determined to create a new state in northeastern Pennsylvania. Timothy Pickering was sent to the region to politically examine the situation. This led to the Pennsylvania Assembly passing a resolution which created Luzerne County. This ended the idea of creating a new state. Luzerne County was created from part of Northumberland County. Under Pickering's leadership and direction, county elections were held, the courts were established, and a government was formed.

=== Revolutionary War ===
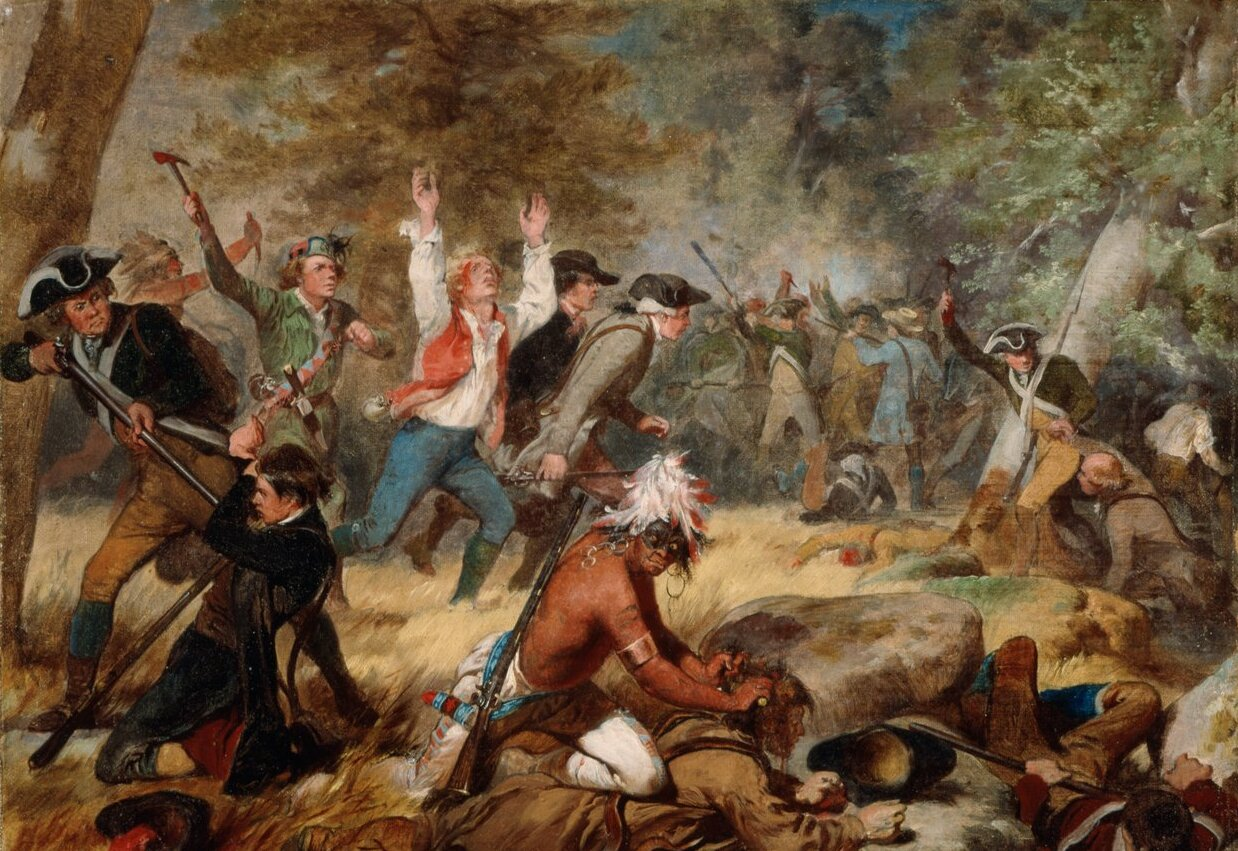
The Battle of Wyoming by Alonzo Chappel (1858)

On June 30, 1778, Loyalist forces, under the command of Major John Butler, arrived in the Wyoming Valley to attack the American settlements. On July 1, Fort Wintermoot at the north end of the valley surrendered without a shot being fired. The next morning the smaller Fort Jenkins surrendered. Both forts were later burned to the ground.

Meanwhile, the Patriot militia assembled at Forty Fort. On July 3, a column of roughly 360 men including a company of soldiers in the Continental Army marched from the fort under the command of Lieutenant Colonel Zebulon Butler and Colonel Nathan Denison. Major Butler's Rangers, with the assistance of 464 Iroquois warriors, ambushed the oncoming Americans. In the end, 302 American soldiers from the Wyoming Valley were killed during the Battle of Wyoming, commonly known as the Wyoming Massacre.

The next day Colonel Denison surrendered Forty Fort along with several other posts. Widespread looting and burning of buildings occurred throughout the Wyoming Valley subsequent to the capitulation, but non-combatants were not harmed. Most of the inhabitants, however, fled across the Pocono Mountains to Stroudsburg and Easton or down the Susquehanna River to Sunbury.

=== Incorporation ===
The community has a rich history in American education. It is said that the first public school in Pennsylvania was erected in Kingston (in the 1770s). The borough is also home to the Upper School of Wyoming Seminary, a prestigious college preparatory school founded in 1844. During the first year, it enrolled 31 students (17 boys and 14 girls). Today, Wyoming Seminary's historic campus hosts roughly 450 students.

Kingston witnessed a population boom after the construction and operation of the Lackawanna and Bloomsburg Railroad. It was incorporated as a borough on November 23, 1857. The borough is named after Kingston, Rhode Island. The first election for the community was held on December 15, 1857. Ruben Jones was elected burgess and justice of the peace. Some of the first council members elected included Bestor Payne, Marshall G. Whitney, Reuben Marcy, Thomas Pringle, and Richard Hutching.

In 1923, the Kingston Armory was built. On September 11, 1950, 33 guardsmen from the 109th Field Artillery Regiment were killed in a train accident near Coshocton, Ohio. In the following days, the dead were moved to the Kingston Armory, where the remains were relinquished to the grief-stricken families.

Coal mining was a chief industry in and around Kingston prior to the Knox Mine Disaster. The 1959 tragedy essentially shut down the mining industry in and around the borough. In June 1972, Kingston was devastated by the flooding of Hurricane Agnes. The hurricane wreaked havoc on Kingston and neighboring Wilkes-Barre, causing a state of emergency. The natural disaster earned national attention and a visit from President Richard Nixon, who recruited Wyoming Seminary graduate Frank Carlucci (a Nixon administration official in the Department of Health, Education, and Welfare) as a point man to oversee flood recovery efforts. After the flood, Kingston adopted a home rule charter. It became effective in January 1976.

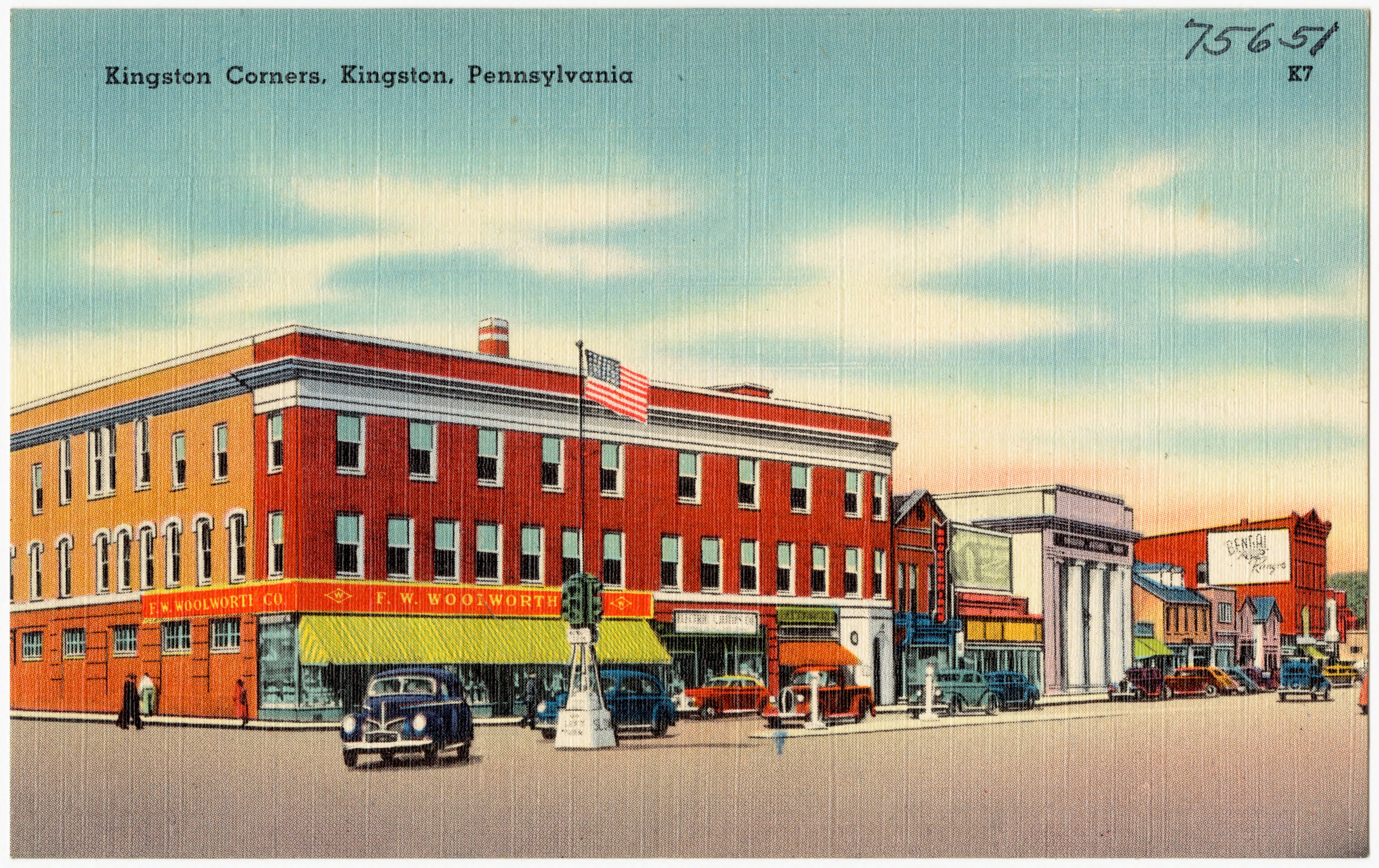
Kingston in the early 20th century

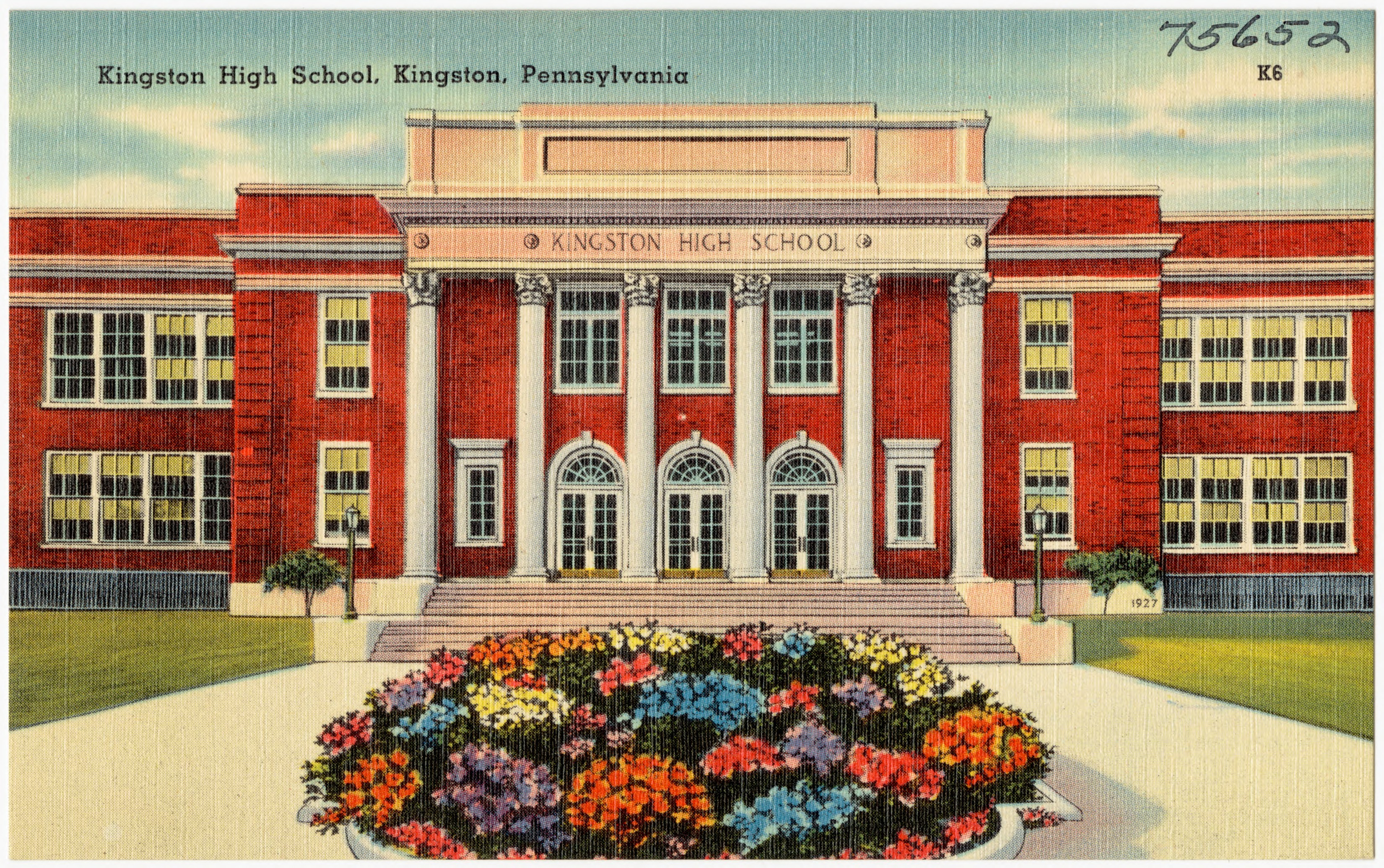
Kingston High School

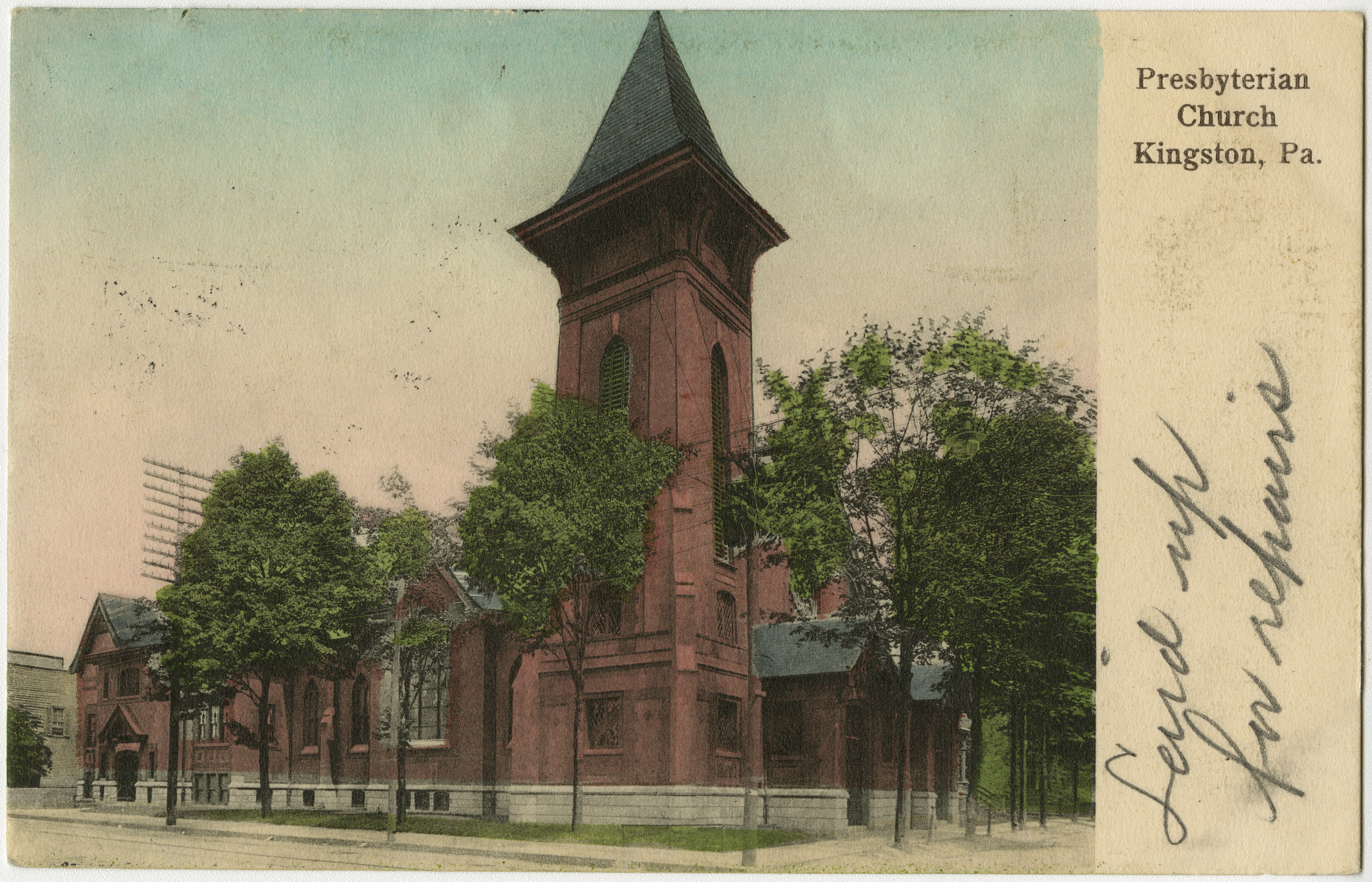
Former Presbyterian Church in Kingston

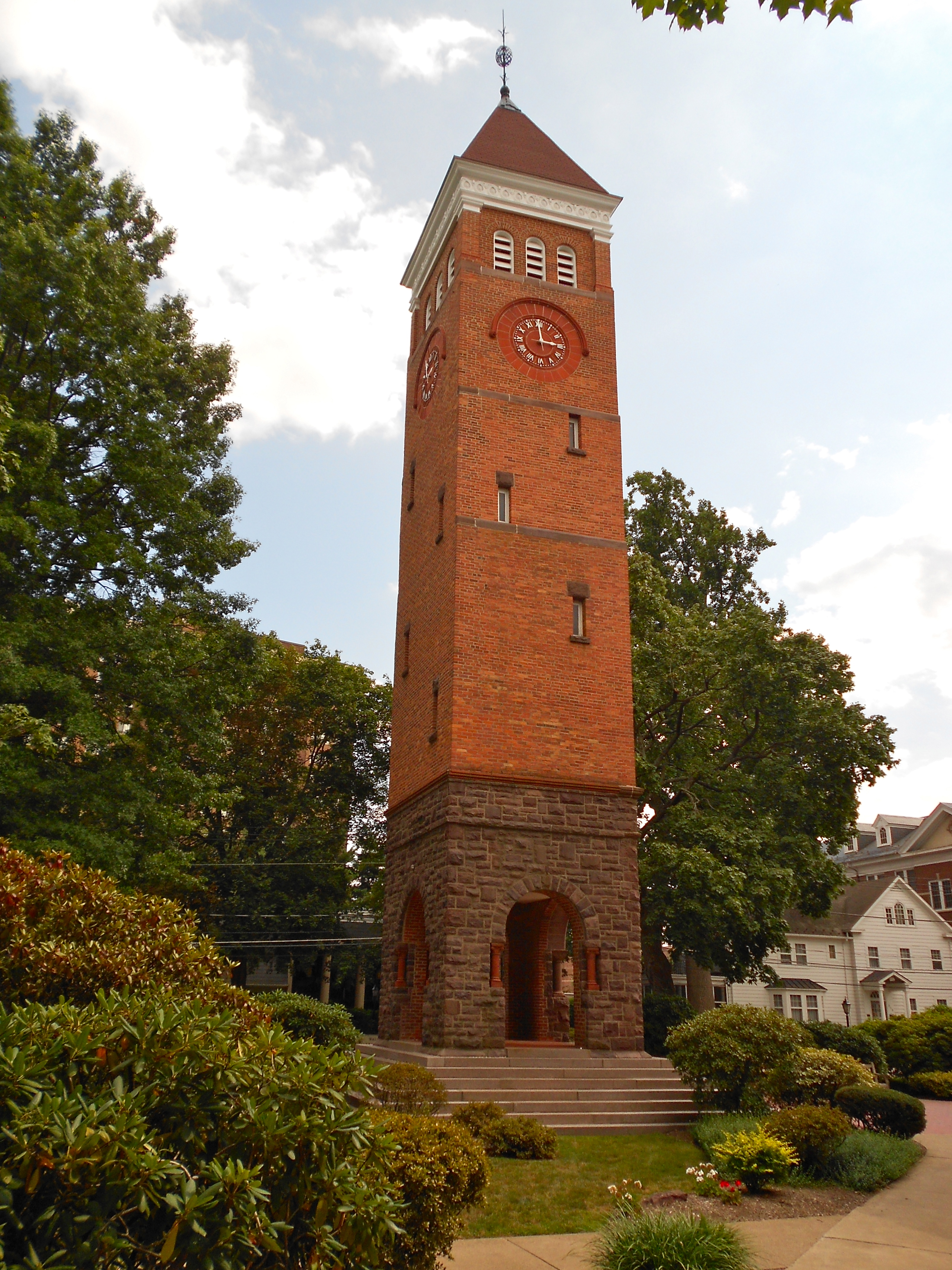
The Bell Tower, Wyoming Seminary

== Geography ==
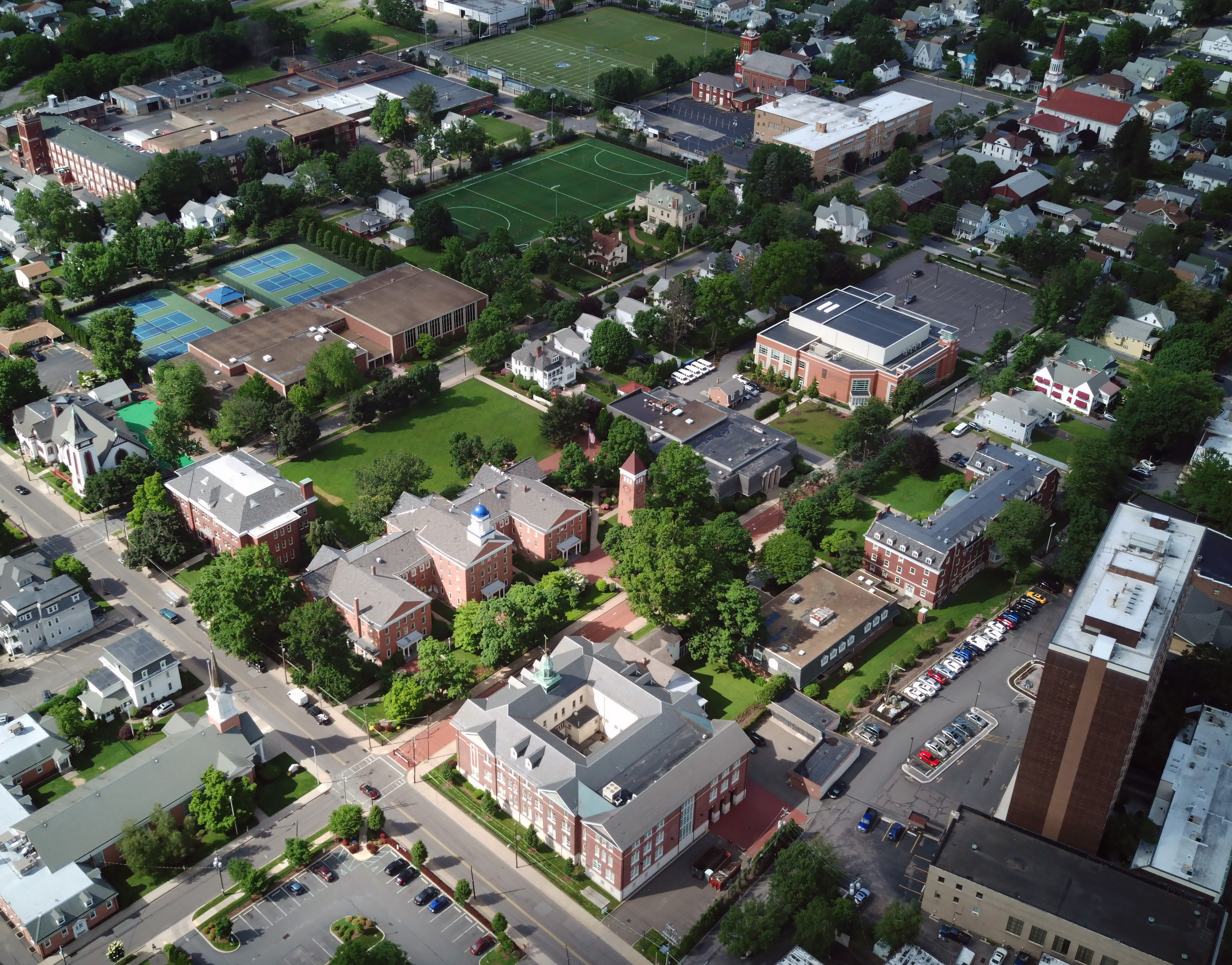
Aerial view of Wyoming Seminary near Downtown Kingston

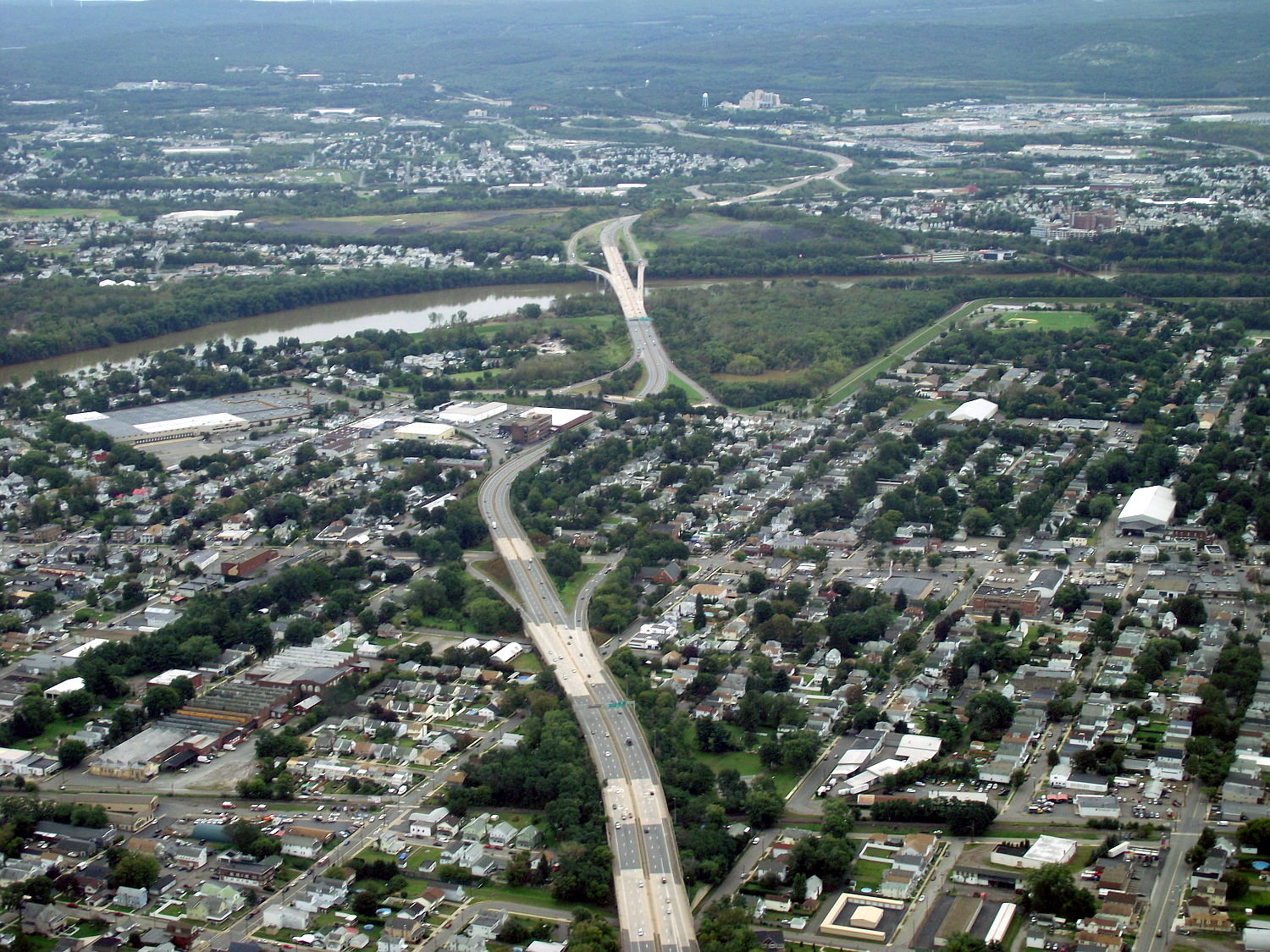
PA Route 309 runs through Kingston and surrounding communities.

Kingston lies within the Wyoming Valley of Northeastern Pennsylvania. It is situated on the western bank of the Susquehanna River in the northern half of Luzerne County.

According to the U.S. Census Bureau, the borough has a total area of 2.2 square miles (5.7 km^{2}), of which 2.1 square miles (5.5 km^{2}) is land and 0.08 square miles (0.2 km^{2}), or 3.61%, is water. It is separated from Wilkes-Barre by the Susquehanna River and the boundary of Kirby Park. Its numbered routes are U.S. Route 11 and Pennsylvania Route 309, which follows the Cross Valley Expressway from the Back Mountain area to Interstate 81 and Route 115 east of Wilkes-Barre City. Market Street and Pierce Street connect Kingston with center city via bridges.

Besides neighboring Wilkes-Barre, Kingston also borders the communities of Edwardsville, Pringle, Luzerne, and Forty Fort. The Borough of Kingston is served by the Wilkes-Barre Wyoming Valley Airport (near Forty Fort) and the Wilkes-Barre/Scranton International Airport (in Pittston Township).

=== Climate ===
Kingston has a humid continental climate (Köppen climate classification Dfa/Dfb) with four distinct seasons. Winters are cold with a January average of 25.8 °F (−3.4 °C). The surrounding mountains have an influence on the climate (including both precipitation and temperatures), leading to wide variations within a short distance. On average, temperatures below 0 °F (−17.8 °C) are infrequent, occurring three days per year, and there are 36 days where the maximum temperature remains below 32 °F (0.0 °C). The average annual snowfall is 46.2 inches (117 cm) during the winter (in which severe snowstorms are rare). However, when snowstorms do occur, they can disrupt normal routines for several days.

Summers are warm, with a July average of 71.4 °F (21.9 °C). In an average summer, temperatures exceeding 90 °F (32.2 °C) occur on an average of nine days and can occasionally exceed 100 °F (37.8 °C). Spring and fall are unpredictable, with temperatures ranging from cold to warm (although they are usually mild). On average, Kingston receives 38.2 inches (970 mm) of precipitation each year, which is relatively evenly distributed throughout the year (though the summer months receive more precipitation). Extreme temperatures range from −21 °F (−29.4 °C) on January 21, 1994, to 103 °F (39.4 °C) on July 9, 1936. Kingston averages 2,303 hours of sunshine per year, ranging from a low of 96 hours in December (or 33% of possible sunshine) to 286 hours in July (or 62% of possible sunshine).

Kingston straddles the hardiness zone boundary between 6a and 6b, meaning that the average annual absolute minimum temperature is approximately -5 °F.

Climate data for Wilkes-Barre/Scranton International Airport, Pennsylvania (1991–2020 normals, (Note: Mean monthly maxima and minima (i.e. the expected highest and lowest temperature readings at any point during the year or given month) calculated based on data at said location from 1991 to 2010.) extremes 1901–present (Note: Official records for Avoca/Wilkes-Barre–Scranton kept at downtown Scranton from January 1901 to 17 April 1955 and at Wilkes-Barre/Scranton International Airport since 18 April 1955.))
Month	Jan	Feb	Mar	Apr	May	Jun	Jul	Aug	Sep	Oct	Nov	Dec	Year
Record high °F (°C)	69 (21)	76 (24)	85 (29)	93 (34)	93 (34)	99 (37)	103 (39)	102 (39)	100 (38)	91 (33)	81 (27)	71 (22)	103 (39)
Mean maximum °F (°C)	57.7 (14.3)	57.0 (13.9)	68.0 (20.0)	81.3 (27.4)	88.0 (31.1)	90.5 (32.5)	92.8 (33.8)	90.5 (32.5)	87.6 (30.9)	78.6 (25.9)	69.1 (20.6)	59.6 (15.3)	94.3 (34.6)
Mean daily maximum °F (°C)	35.7 (2.1)	38.8 (3.8)	47.6 (8.7)	61.1 (16.2)	72.2 (22.3)	79.9 (26.6)	84.6 (29.2)	82.4 (28.0)	75.1 (23.9)	63.1 (17.3)	51.2 (10.7)	40.3 (4.6)	61.0 (16.1)
Daily mean °F (°C)	28.0 (−2.2)	30.3 (−0.9)	38.3 (3.5)	50.2 (10.1)	60.9 (16.1)	69.0 (20.6)	73.7 (23.2)	71.8 (22.1)	64.6 (18.1)	53.2 (11.8)	42.7 (5.9)	33.3 (0.7)	51.3 (10.7)
Mean daily minimum °F (°C)	20.3 (−6.5)	21.9 (−5.6)	28.9 (−1.7)	39.3 (4.1)	49.6 (9.8)	58.1 (14.5)	62.7 (17.1)	61.1 (16.2)	54.0 (12.2)	43.3 (6.3)	34.3 (1.3)	26.3 (−3.2)	41.7 (5.4)
Mean minimum °F (°C)	0.6 (−17.4)	3.6 (−15.8)	11.0 (−11.7)	24.7 (−4.1)	34.7 (1.5)	44.1 (6.7)	50.9 (10.5)	48.8 (9.3)	38.7 (3.7)	28.7 (−1.8)	18.0 (−7.8)	9.1 (−12.7)	−1.6 (−18.7)
Record low °F (°C)	−21 (−29)	−19 (−28)	−4 (−20)	8 (−13)	27 (−3)	34 (1)	43 (6)	38 (3)	29 (−2)	19 (−7)	5 (−15)	−13 (−25)	−21 (−29)
Average precipitation inches (mm)	2.59 (66)	2.07 (53)	2.77 (70)	3.26 (83)	3.26 (83)	3.80 (97)	3.61 (92)	3.85 (98)	4.15 (105)	3.71 (94)	2.85 (72)	2.80 (71)	38.72 (983)
Average snowfall inches (cm)	11.7 (30)	10.9 (28)	10.1 (26)	0.8 (2.0)	0.0 (0.0)	0.0 (0.0)	0.0 (0.0)	0.0 (0.0)	0.0 (0.0)	0.7 (1.8)	3.2 (8.1)	7.7 (20)	45.1 (115)
Average precipitation days (≥ 0.01 in)	12.6	11.4	11.8	12.2	12.9	12.9	11.1	11.1	10.0	10.7	10.3	12.1	139.1
Average snowy days (≥ 0.1 in)	8.7	8.4	4.8	1.0	0.0	0.0	0.0	0.0	0.0	0.3	1.7	6.3	31.2
Average relative humidity (%)	70.1	67.5	63.3	60.4	64.6	70.5	71.1	73.8	75.2	71.6	71.8	72.5	69.4
Average dew point °F (°C)	16.2 (−8.8)	17.2 (−8.2)	24.4 (−4.2)	33.1 (0.6)	45.3 (7.4)	55.9 (13.3)	60.4 (15.8)	59.9 (15.5)	53.4 (11.9)	41.4 (5.2)	32.2 (0.1)	22.3 (−5.4)	38.5 (3.6)
Mean monthly sunshine hours	130.3	143.7	185.7	210.5	246.9	269.7	285.7	257.2	200.2	173.3	104.3	95.9	2,303.4
Percentage possible sunshine	44	48	50	53	55	60	62	60	54	50	35	33	52
Source: NOAA (relative humidity and dew point 1964–1990, sun 1961–1990)

== Demographics ==
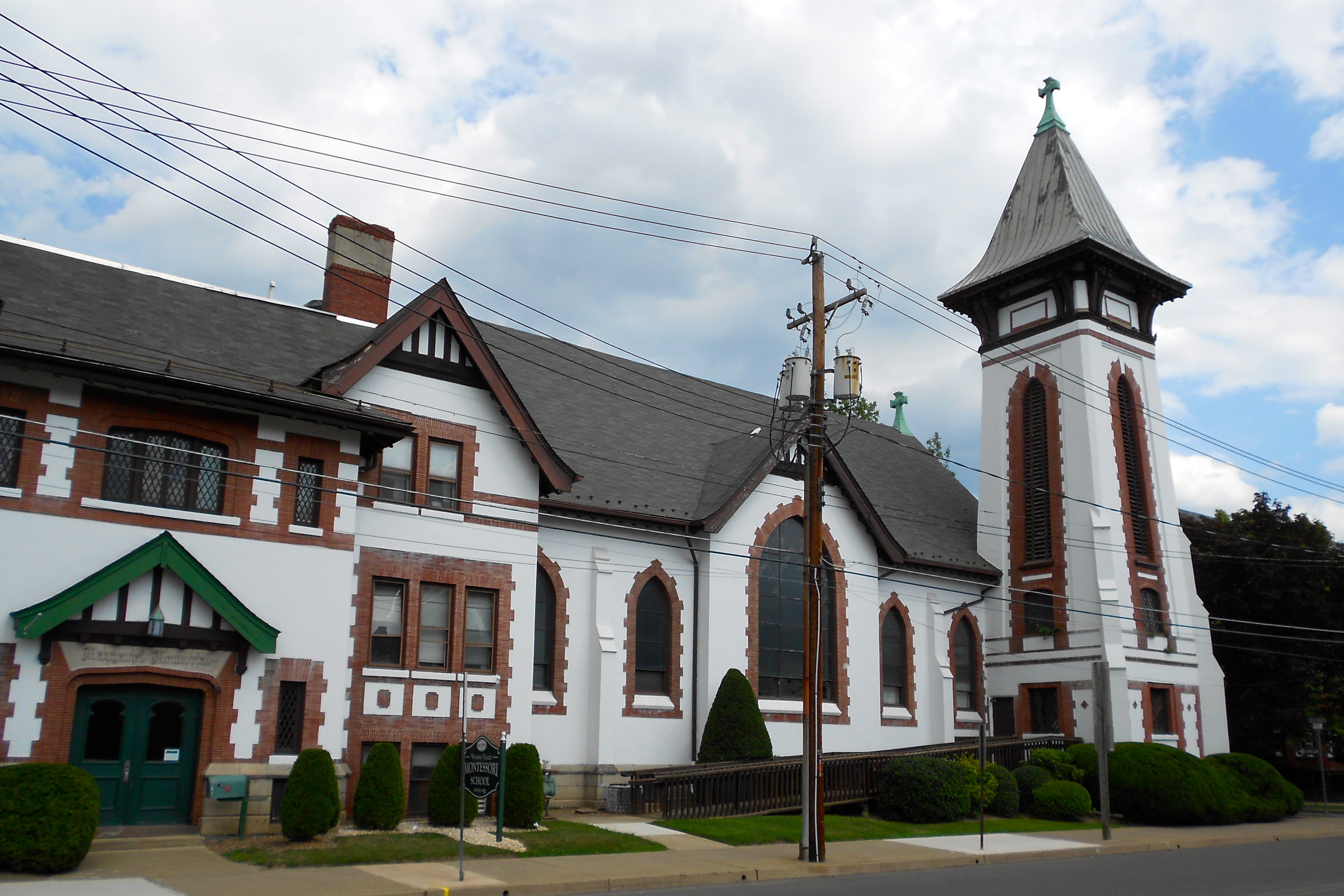
Former Presbyterian church in Kingston, which is now a Montessori school

Historical population
Census	Pop.	Note	%±
1860	638		—
1870	1,143		79.2%
1880	1,418		24.1%
1890	2,381		67.9%
1900	3,846		61.5%
1910	6,449		67.7%
1920	8,952		38.8%
1930	21,600		141.3%
1940	20,679		−4.3%
1950	21,096		2.0%
1960	20,261		−4.0%
1970	18,325		−9.6%
1980	15,681		−14.4%
1990	14,507		−7.5%
2000	13,855		−4.5%
2010	13,182		−4.9%
2020	13,349		1.3%

=== 2020 census ===
As of the 2020 census, Kingston had a population of 13,349. The median age was 40.7 years. 20.3% of residents were under the age of 18 and 20.4% of residents were 65 years of age or older. For every 100 females there were 95.1 males, and for every 100 females age 18 and over there were 91.3 males age 18 and over.

100.0% of residents lived in urban areas, while 0.0% lived in rural areas.

There were 5,948 households in Kingston, of which 22.6% had children under the age of 18 living in them. Of all households, 33.0% were married-couple households, 23.6% were households with a male householder and no spouse or partner present, and 34.5% were households with a female householder and no spouse or partner present. About 40.1% of all households were made up of individuals and 17.1% had someone living alone who was 65 years of age or older.

There were 6,534 housing units, of which 9.0% were vacant. The homeowner vacancy rate was 2.2% and the rental vacancy rate was 5.9%.

Racial composition as of the 2020 census
Race	Number	Percent
White	10,918	81.8%
Black or African American	949	7.1%
American Indian and Alaska Native	41	0.3%
Asian	343	2.6%
Native Hawaiian and Other Pacific Islander	3	0.0%
Some other race	352	2.6%
Two or more races	743	5.6%
Hispanic or Latino (of any race)	841	6.3%

=== 2000 census ===
As of the 2000 census, there were 13,855 people, 6,065 households, and 3,372 families residing in the borough. The population density was 6,461.6 inhabitants per square mile (2,494.8/km^{2}). There were 6,555 housing units at an average density of 3,057.1 per square mile (1,180.4/km^{2}). The racial makeup of the borough was 96.84% White, 0.77% African American, 0.07% Native American, 1.53% Asian, 0.01% Pacific Islander, 0.29% from other races, and 0.50% from two or more races. Hispanic or Latino of any race were 0.80% of the population.

There were 6,065 households, out of which 23.1% had children under the age of 18 living with them, 40.7% were married couples living together, 11.3% had a female householder with no husband present, and 44.4% were non-families. 40.1% of all households were made up of individuals, and 20.5% had someone living alone who was 65 years of age or older. The average household size was 2.16 and the average family size was 2.94.

In the borough, the population was spread out, with 19.7% under the age of 18, 7.5% from 18 to 24, 25.6% from 25 to 44, 22.8% from 45 to 64, and 24.4% who were 65 years of age or older. The median age was 43 years. For every 100 females, there were 83.9 males. For every 100 females age 18 and over, there were 78.9 males.

The median income for a household in the borough was $33,611, and the median income for a family was $45,578. Males had a median income of $34,069 versus $24,482 for females. The per capita income for the borough was $20,568. About 8.2% of families and 11.3% of the population were below the poverty line, including 11.7% of those under age 18 and 10.3% of those age 65 or over.

=== Religion ===
59.27% of the people in Kingston, Pennsylvania, are religious—meaning they affiliate with a religion. 43.77% are Catholic; 0.28% are LDS; 2.33% are another Christian faith; 0.78% are Jewish; 0.00% are an eastern faith; and 0.51% practice Islam.

== Government ==
Kingston operates under a home rule charter, which became effective in January 1976. The executive branch consists of a mayor and a full-time municipal administrator. The legislative function is vested in a seven-member council.

=== Executive ===
The current mayor is Jeffrey R. Coslett; he assumed office in 2022. His predecessor was Paul J. Roberts (who served from 2018 until 2022).

=== Legislative ===
Members of the borough council:

- Council President Robert Jacobs (Republican, 1998–present)
- Council Vice President Nancy Cooper (Republican, 2000–present)
- John Chernesky (Democrat)
- Al Littzi (Democrat)
- Doug Rush (Democrat)
- Kate McMahon (Democrat)
- Paul Roberts Jr.

== Politics ==
In June 2012, the borough was 54 percent Democratic, a reversal from the early 1990s when it was a 60 percent Republican borough.

=== State and federal representation ===
- State Representative Brenda Pugh, 120th legislative district (Republican, 2025–present)
- State Senator Lisa Baker, 20th Senatorial district (Republican, 2007–present)
- U.S. Representative Rob Bresnahan, 8th Congressional district (Republican, 2025–present)

== Public safety ==
=== Police ===
The Kingston Police Department consists of 22 sworn members. It is the third largest department in Luzerne County. The police provide full-time protection for its citizens, visitors, businesses, and public property. The department is made up of a Special Victims Unit (SVU), K-9 unit, Patrol Division, Criminal Investigation Division, and a Special Investigations Division (SID). The current chief of police is Richard Kotchik.

=== Firefighters ===
The Kingston Fire Department provides full-time emergency firefighting and fire protection services for the borough. Today's department operates from its headquarters at 600 Wyoming Avenue in Kingston. It consists of 31 career and around 30 volunteer firefighters. The current fire chief is Floyd Young.

== Education and health ==
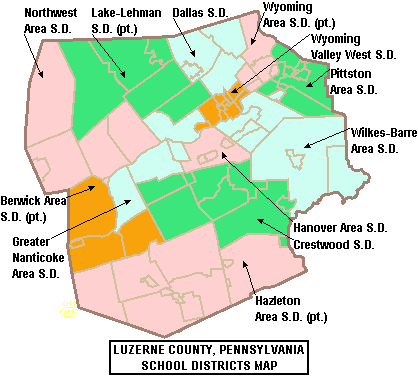
Wyoming Valley West School District (seen in orange)

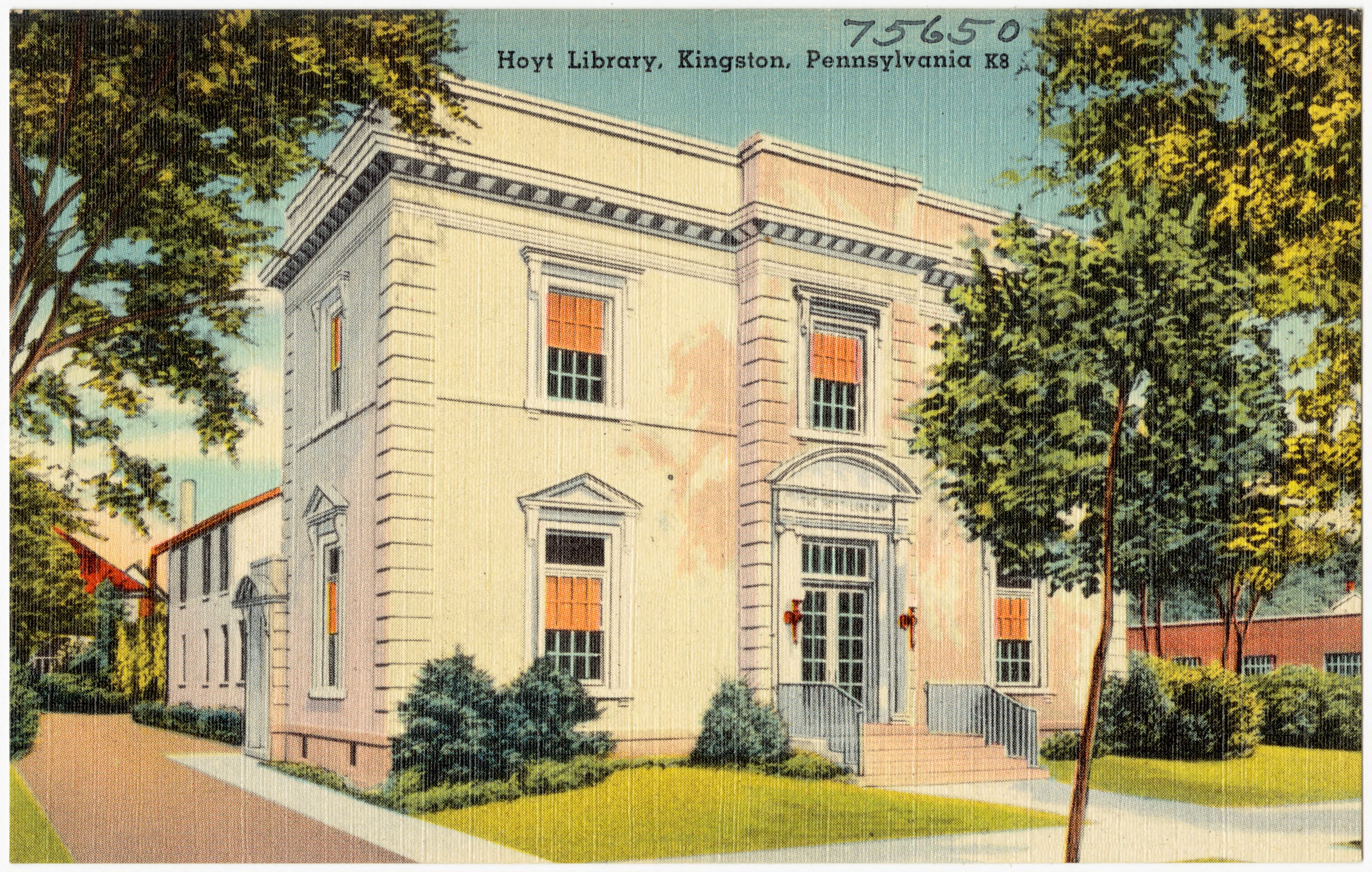
Hoyt Library

The borough has a rich history in American education. It is said that the first public school in Pennsylvania was erected in Kingston (in the 1770s). The borough is part of the Wyoming Valley West School District.

=== Public and private schools ===
- Graham Academy
- Jenny Lynn Ferraro Academy
- Pringle Street Elementary School
- Wyoming Seminary Upper School
- Wyoming Valley Montessori School
- Wyoming Valley West Middle School
- Third Avenue Elementary School
- Chester Street Elementary School
- Schuyler Avenue Elementary School

=== Libraries ===
- Hoyt Library

=== Hospitals ===
- First Hospital

== Culture ==
=== In film and television ===
- In 2013, the film The English Teacher is set in Kingston, though it was not filmed there. The film features several references of the Wyoming Valley region, including a mention of Wilkes University.
- In 1976, the third episode of the Israeli Educational Television English-teaching fiction series Gabby & Debby takes place in a Kingston coal mine, where two youths manage to rescue an injured worker trapped after an accident.

=== National Register of Historic Places ===
In addition to Fleck Hall on the campus of Wyoming Seminary, the Kingston Armory and Market Street Bridge are also listed on the National Register of Historic Places.

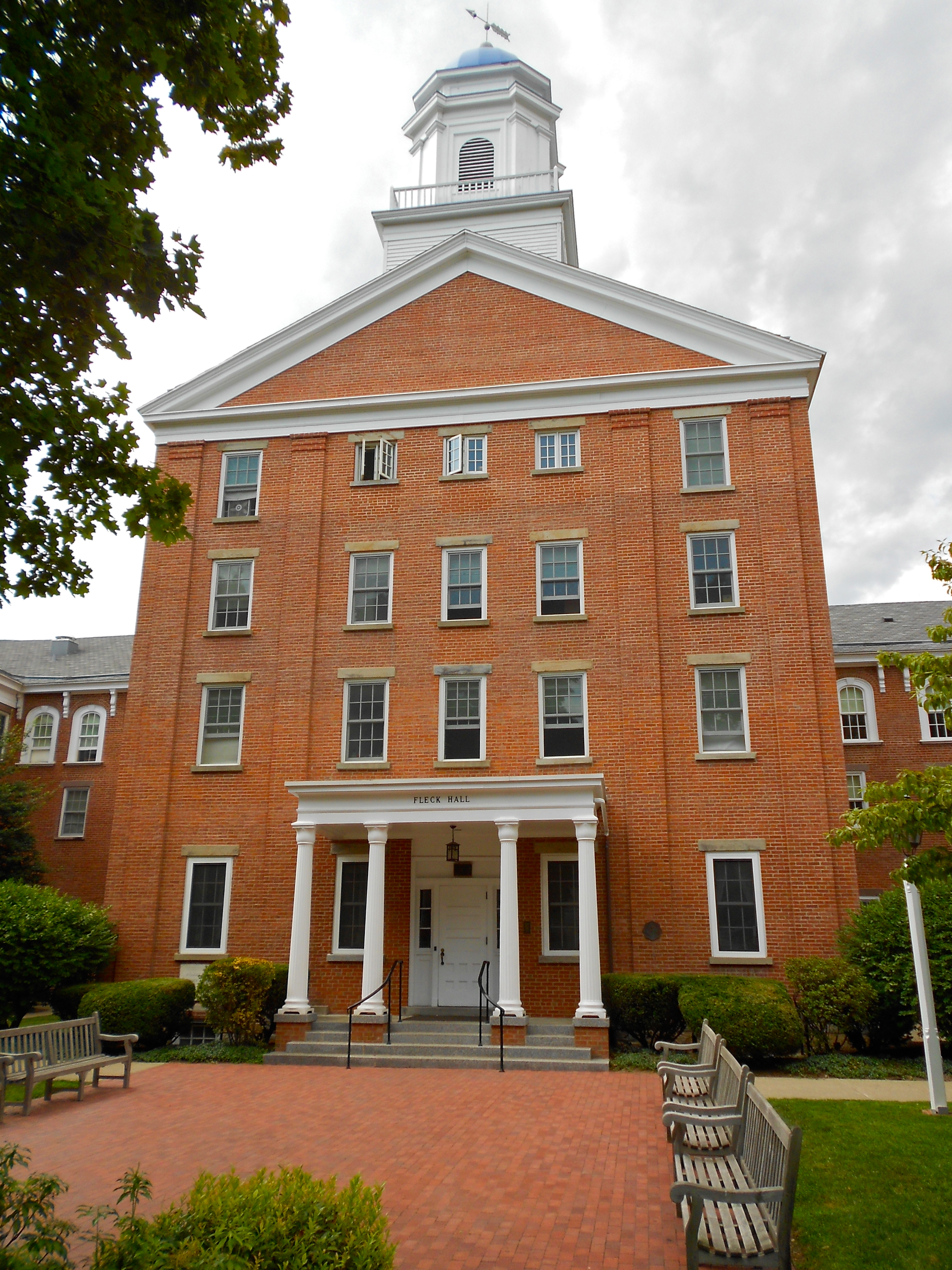
Wyoming Seminary

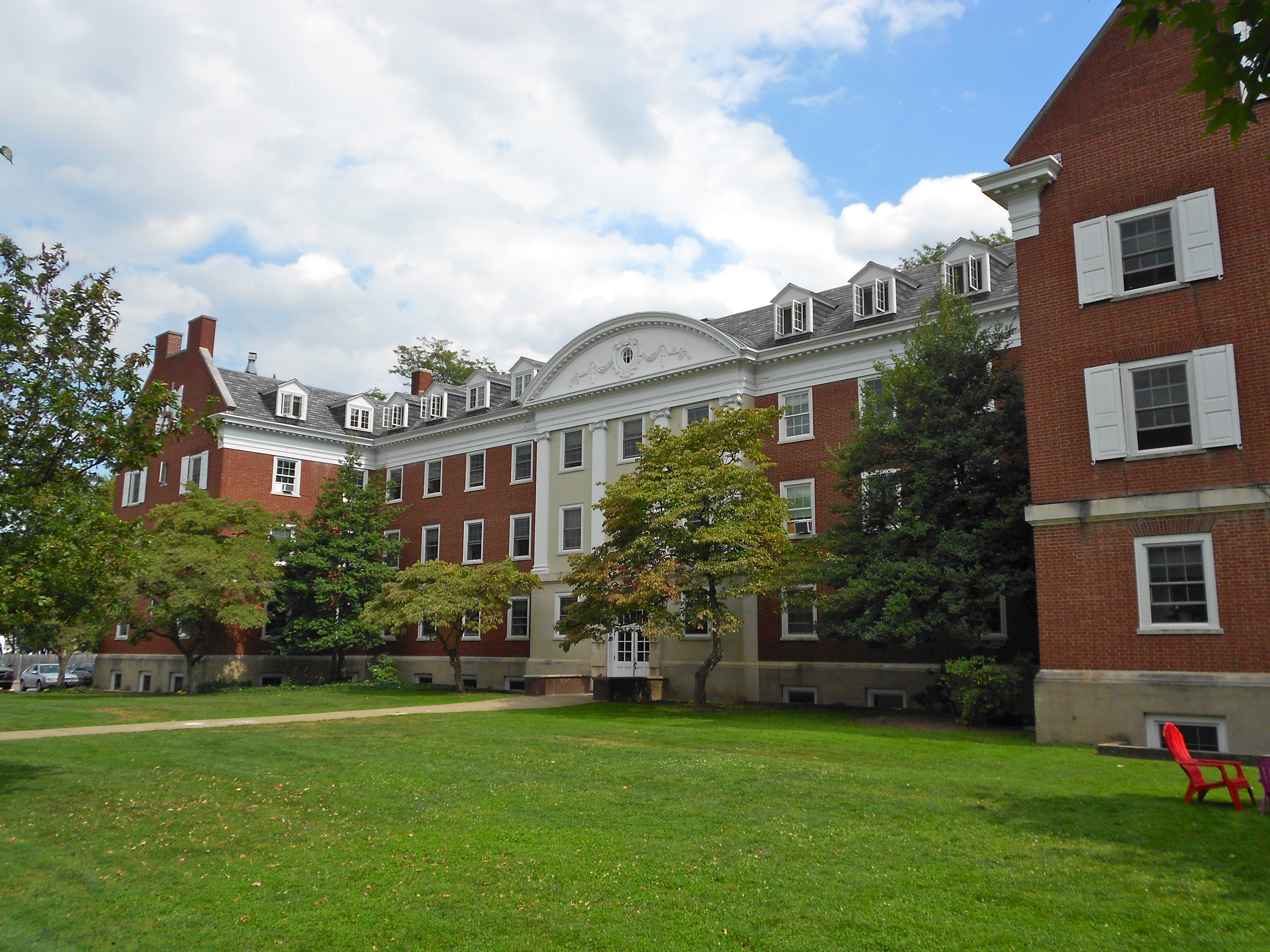
Wyoming Seminary's Carpenter Hall

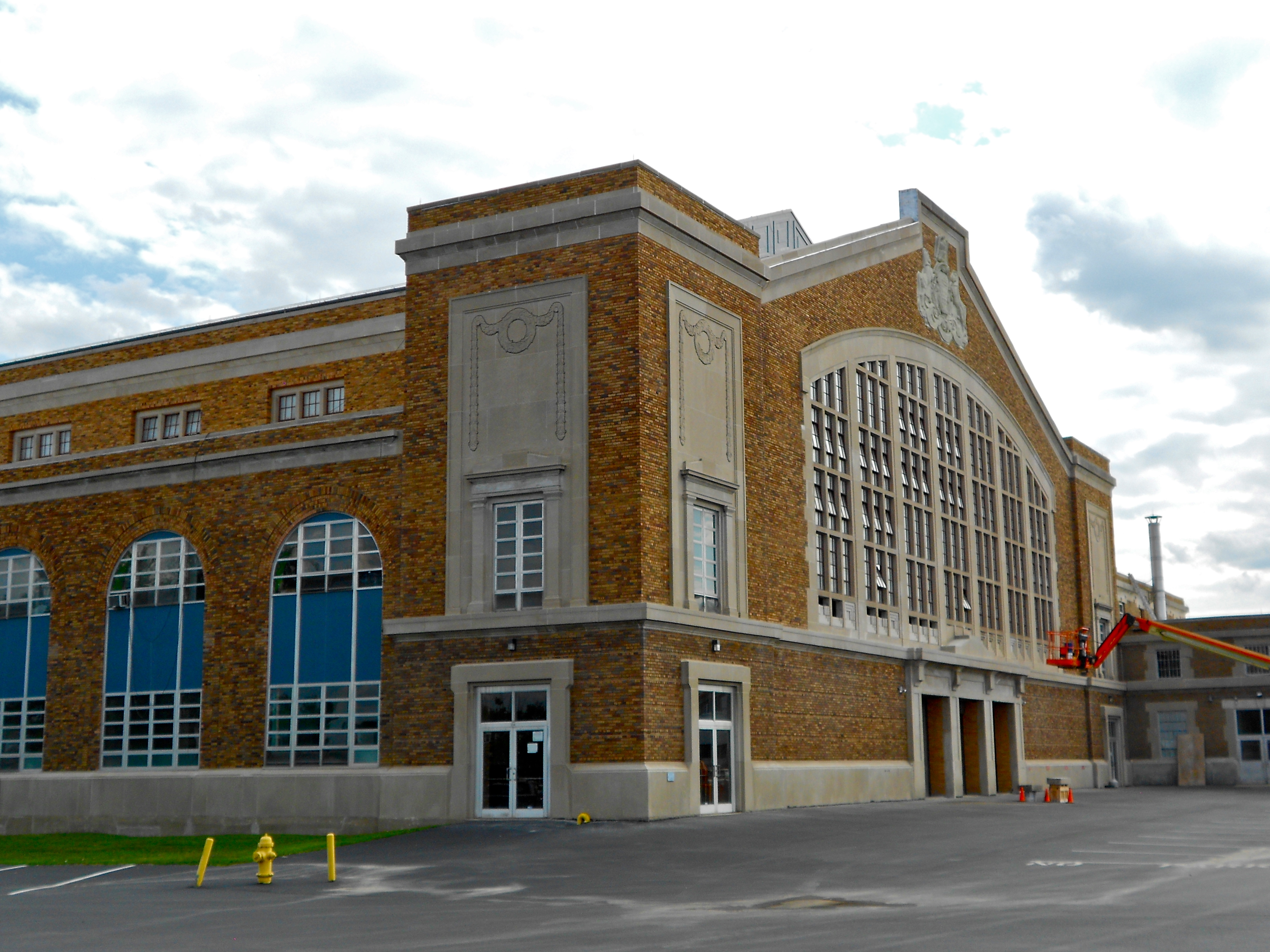
Kingston Armory

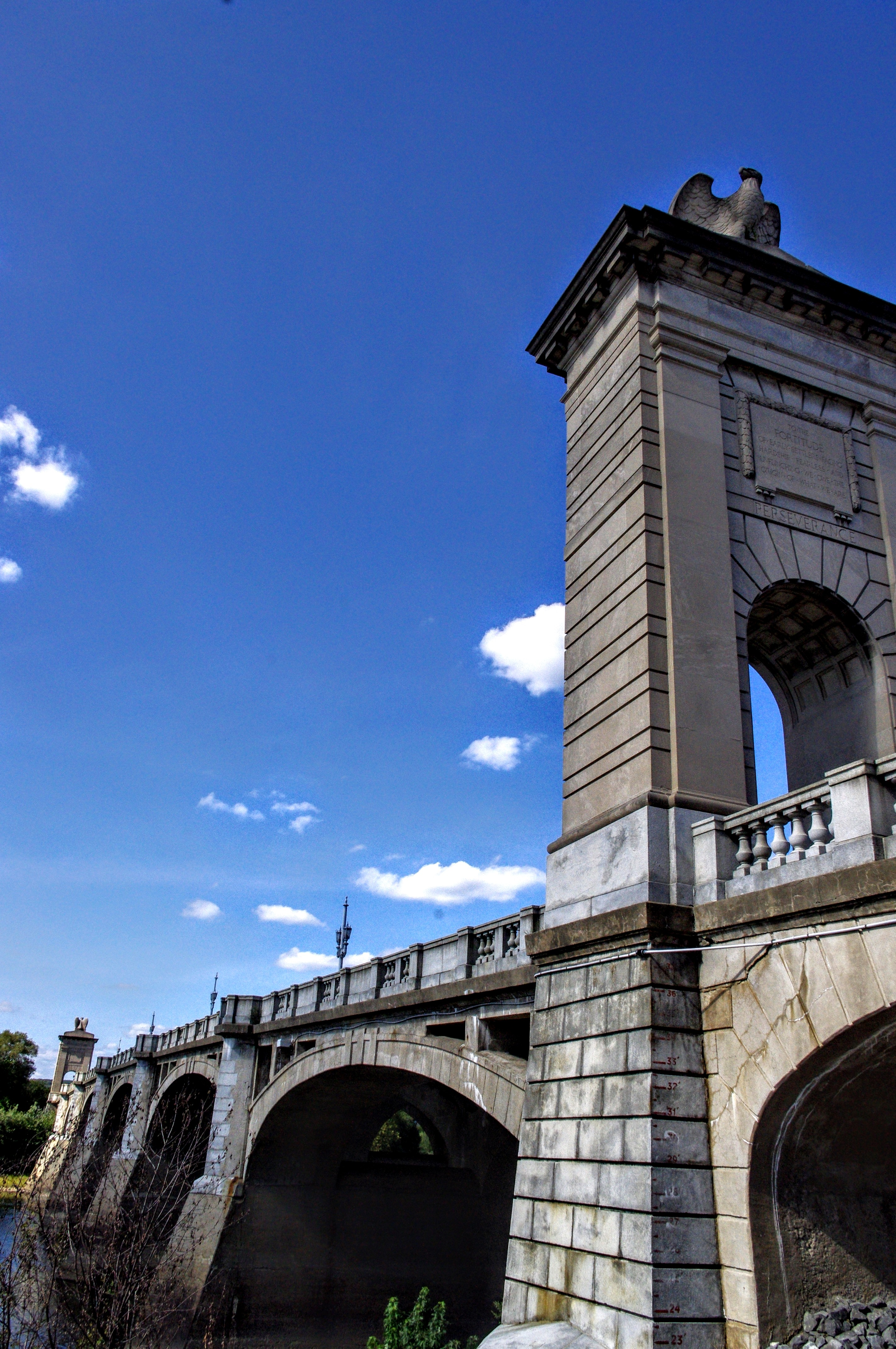
Market Street Bridge

== Notable people ==
- Edie Adams (1927–2008), singer, actress, comedian (It's a Mad, Mad, Mad, Mad World, The Apartment), wife of Ernie Kovacs
- Mike Aquilina (born 1963), a popular author
- Michael Barone (born 1946), host of the organ music program Pipedreams on American Public Media
- George Bednar (1942–2007), American college football player for the University of Notre Dame and a business executive
- Kevin Blaum (born 1952), a Pennsylvania State Representative
- Fletcher C. Booker Jr. (1920–2012), US Army major general
- Rob Bresnahan (born 1990), U.S. representative for Pennsylvania
- Charles Bressler, opera singer
- Russell Bufalino (1903–1994), organized crime leader in Pennsylvania, New York, and the American Cosa Nostra
- Francis Dolan Collins (1841–1891), a U.S. Representative from Pennsylvania
- Bob Coolbaugh (1939–1985), an American football wide receiver for the Oakland Raiders
- Clarence Dennis Coughlin (1883–1946), a U.S. Representative from Pennsylvania
- Craig Czury (born 1951), an American poet
- George Denison (1790–1831), a U.S. Representative from Pennsylvania
- Steamer Flanagan (1881–1947), Major League Baseball player
- Dan Harris (born 1979), Hollywood director (Imaginary Heroes) and screenwriter (X2 and Superman Returns)
- Jimy Hettes (born 1987), an American mixed martial artist currently competing as a featherweight in the Ultimate Fighting Championship
- Henry M. Hoyt (1830–1892), Governor of Pennsylvania
- Stephanie Jallen (born 1996), Paralympic skier
- Aaron Kaufer (born 1988), a Pennsylvania State Representative
- Bill Kern (1906–1985), an American football player and coach
- Phyllis Mundy (born 1948), a Pennsylvania State Representative
- Paul F. Nichols (born 1952), delegate to the Virginia General Assembly
- Dennis Packard (born 1982), professional ice hockey player
- Joseph F. Perugino (born 1938), US Army major general
- Tina Pickett (born 1943), a Pennsylvania State Representative
- Joe Pisarcik (born 1952), American football quarterback
- Suzie Plakson (born 1958), actress
- Dave Popson (born 1964), National Basketball Association player
- Jamie Rhoden (born 1990), rhythm guitarist and singer for American post-hardcore band Title Fight
- Lauren Powley (born 1984), an American field hockey player
- John Quackenbush (born 1962), computational biologist and genetic researcher
- Edwin Raub (1921–1998), a television personality and horror host
- Evelyn C. Roat (1903–1995), writer and editor in Arizona
- Ed Rutkowski (born 1941), an American football player
- Ned Russin (born 1990), lead singer and bassist for American post-hardcore band Title Fight and rock band Glitterer
- Lazarus Denison Shoemaker (1819–1893), a U.S. Representative from Pennsylvania
- Len Supulski (1920–1943), an American football player for the Philadelphia Eagles
- Dan Terry (1924–2011), trumpet player and big band leader
- Charles Murray Turpin (1878–1946), a U.S. Representative from Pennsylvania
- Frank Zane (born 1942), bodybuilder and three-time Mr. Olympia
