= Forty Fort, Pennsylvania =

Borough in Pennsylvania, US

- Borough
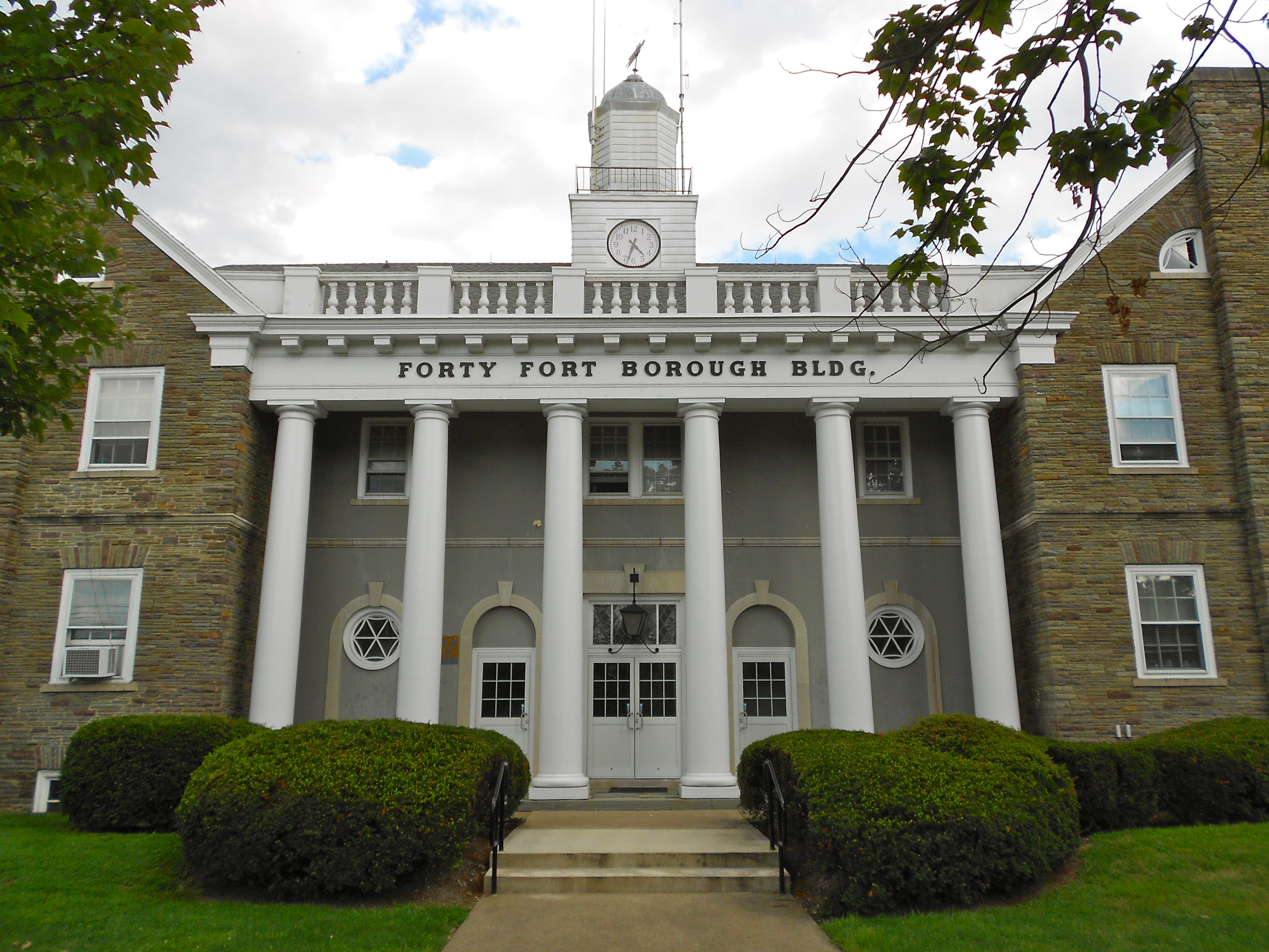
- Forty Fort Borough Building

- Location of Forty Fort in Luzerne County, Pennsylvania

- Location within Pennsylvania Location within the United States
- Coordinates: 41°17′0″N 75°52′24″W
- Country: United States
- State: Pennsylvania
- County: Luzerne
- Settled: 1778
- Incorporated: 1887

Government
  - Body: Borough Council
  - Mayor: Mary Ann Bottaro (D)

Area
  - Total: 1.52 sq mi (3.93 km^{2})
  - Land: 1.31 sq mi (3.38 km^{2})
  - Water: 0.21 sq mi (0.55 km^{2})

Population (2020)
  - Total: 4,239
  - Density: 3,247.1/sq mi (1,253.71/km^{2})
- Time zone: UTC−5 (Eastern (EST))
  - Summer (DST): UTC−4 (EDT)
- Zip code: 18704
- Area code: 570
- FIPS code: 42-26880
- Website: www.fortyfort.org

Forty Fort is a borough in Luzerne County, Pennsylvania, United States. The population was 4,233 at the 2020 census. Its neighbors are Wyoming (to the north), Plains Township (to the east), Kingston (to the south), and Swoyersville (to the west). The Wilkes-Barre Wyoming Valley Airport and the Wyoming Seminary Lower School are both located in the borough.

== History ==
=== Revolutionary War ===
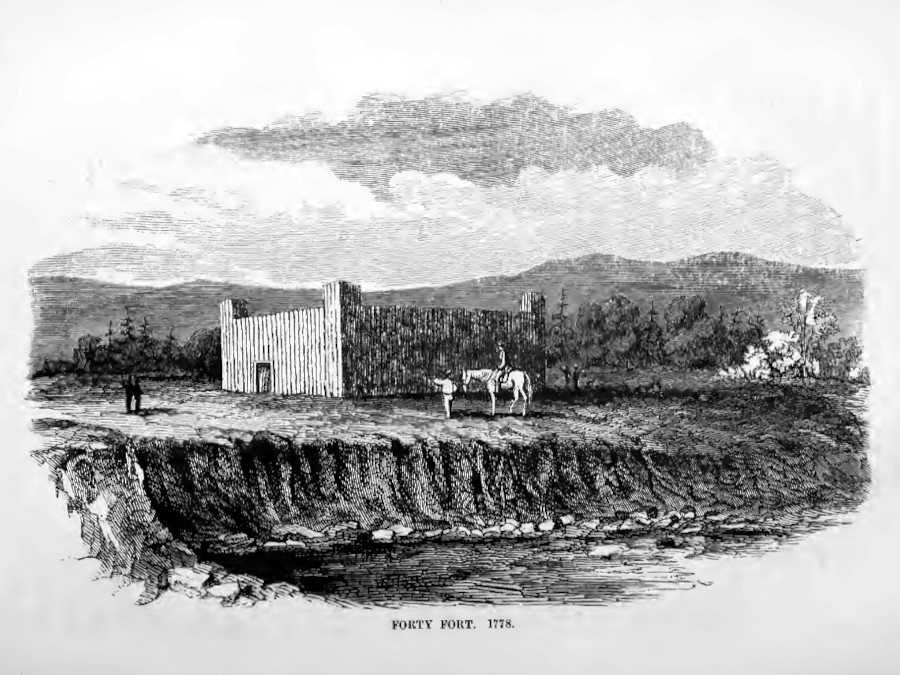
Artist's conception of Forty Fort in 1778

In 1770, forty settlers from Westmoreland County, Connecticut, established a fort along the Susquehanna River in the area now known as Forty Fort Borough. Before the American Revolutionary War, both Connecticut and Pennsylvania claimed this territory, as Connecticut laid claim to a wide swath of land to its west based on its colonial charter. These competing claims triggered the Pennamite–Yankee Wars but were resolved after the Revolutionary War when the federal government awarded the contested territory to Pennsylvania.

During the Revolutionary War, a force of Loyalist soldiers and Haudenosaunee warriors arrived in the Wyoming Valley on June 30, 1778. On July 1, Fort Wintermoot and Fort Jenkins surrendered. Demands for Forty Fort to surrender were rebuked. On July 3, roughly 300 Patriot militia and 60 Continentals under the command of Colonel Zebulon Butler sallied from Forty Fort. In the ensuing Battle of Wyoming, commonly known as the Wyoming Massacre, about 300 Americans were killed.

The next morning, July 4, Colonel Nathan Denison agreed to surrender Forty Fort and two smaller forts, along with what remained of the militia. The Loyalist commander paroled them on their promise to take no part in further hostilities. None of the inhabitants were injured after the surrender, although some had their personal effects plundered. In 1900, a large stone was placed at the end of Fort Street, in Forty Fort Borough, by the Daughters of the American Revolution to mark the approximate location of Forty Fort.

=== Post-Revolutionary War ===
In the years following the Revolutionary War, Forty Fort became home to both the Nathan Denison House (built around 1790) and the Forty Fort Meetinghouse (built in 1806–08), which is located in the borough's cemetery. Forty Fort was officially incorporated as a borough in 1887. The borough later became home to the Lower School of the Wyoming Seminary and a portion of the southern end of the Wilkes-Barre Wyoming Valley Airport.

=== Flooding ===
In June 1972, Hurricane Agnes caused the Susquehanna River to overflow its banks. In Forty Fort, a portion of the levee protecting the town broke. This caused millions of dollars in damage to Forty Fort and the surrounding communities. In addition to structural damage, the Forty Fort Cemetery was heavily affected when over 2,000 caskets were washed away. Recovered bodies were eventually buried in a mass grave with a monument marking the 1972 flood's damage. In September 2011, the borough's levee system was once again put to the test when Tropical Storm Lee caused severe flooding throughout the Wyoming Valley. However, this time the levee held, and the town was preserved from the catastrophe it witnessed in 1972.

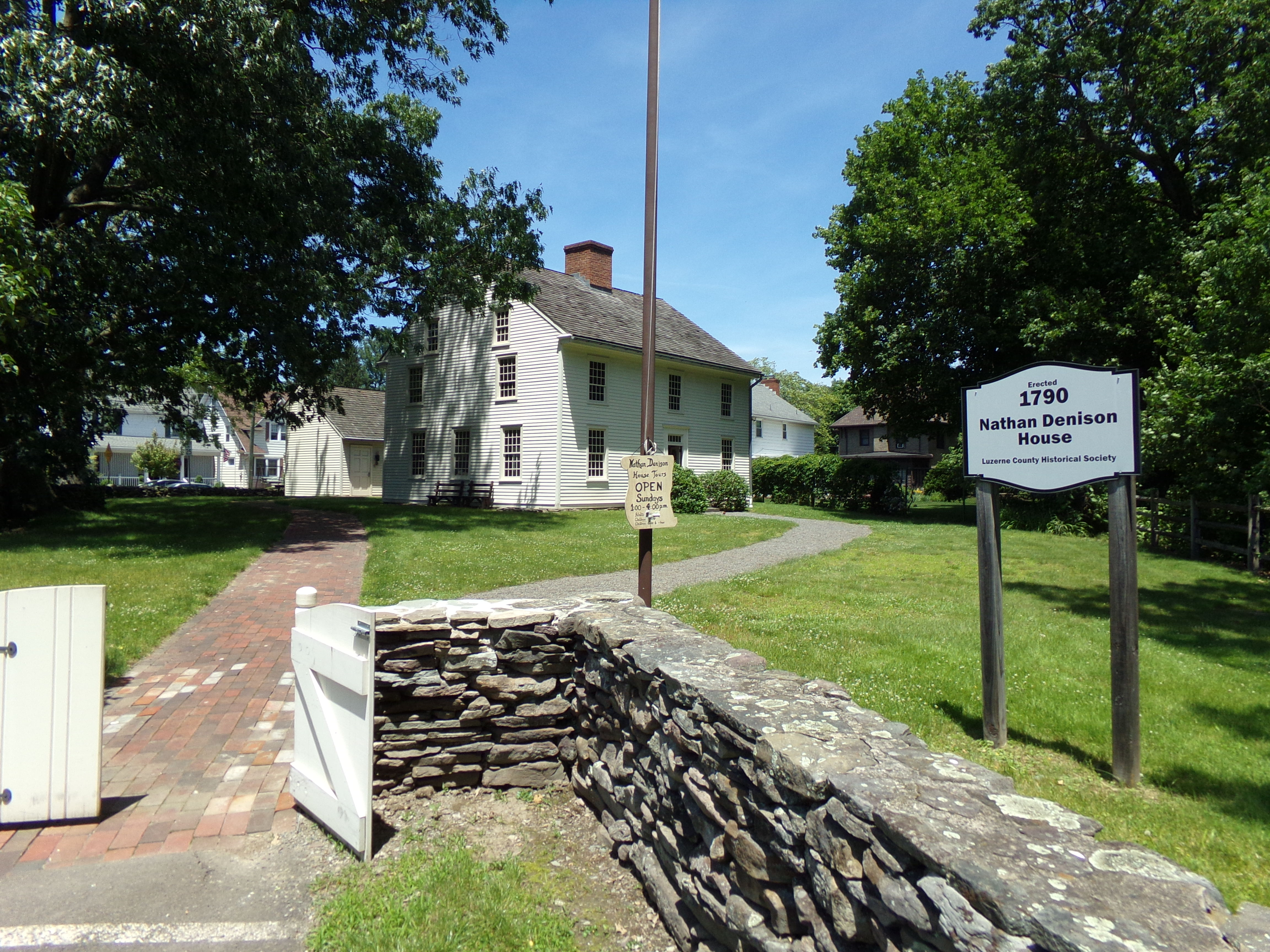
Denison House

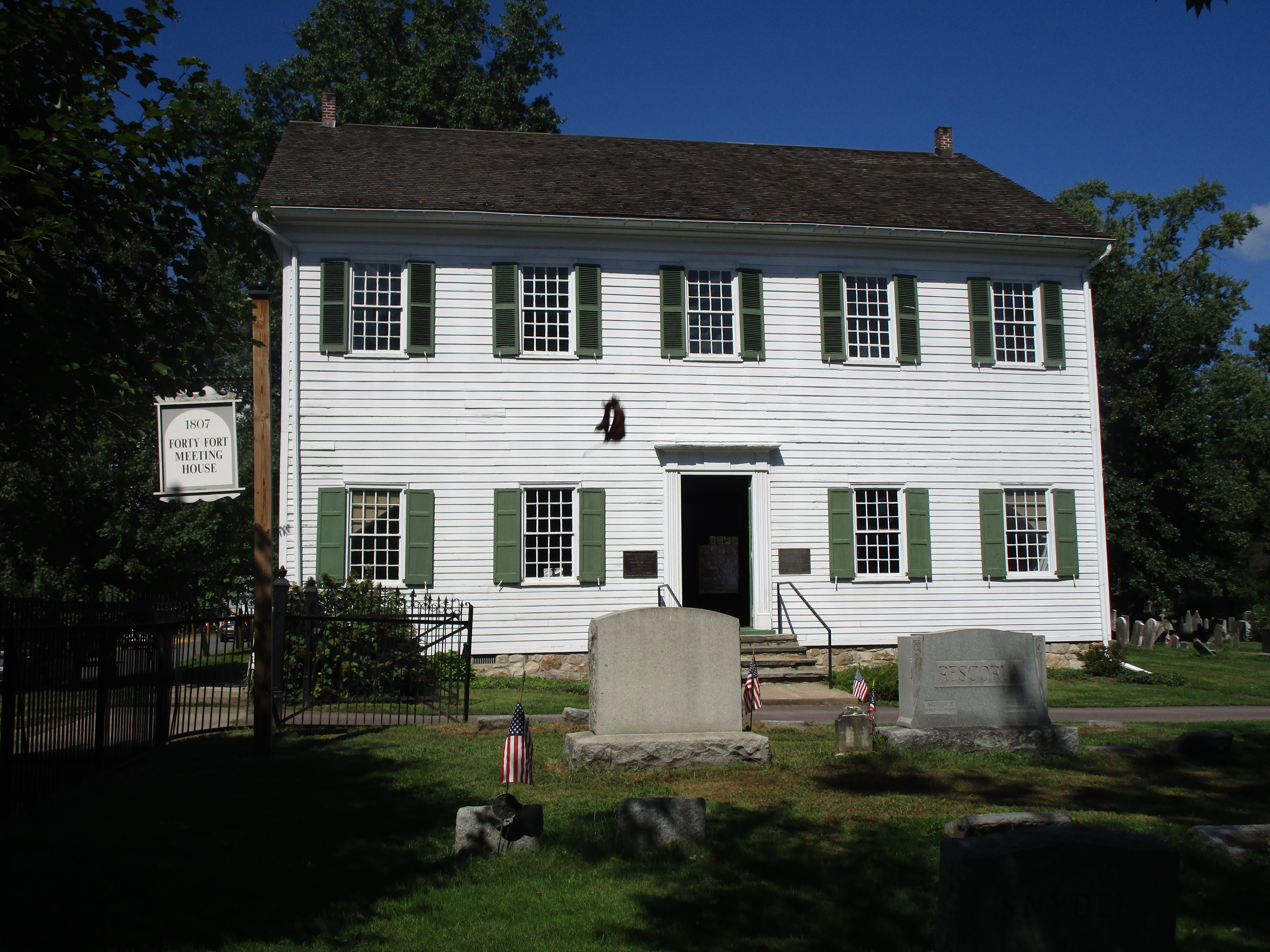
Forty Fort Meetinghouse

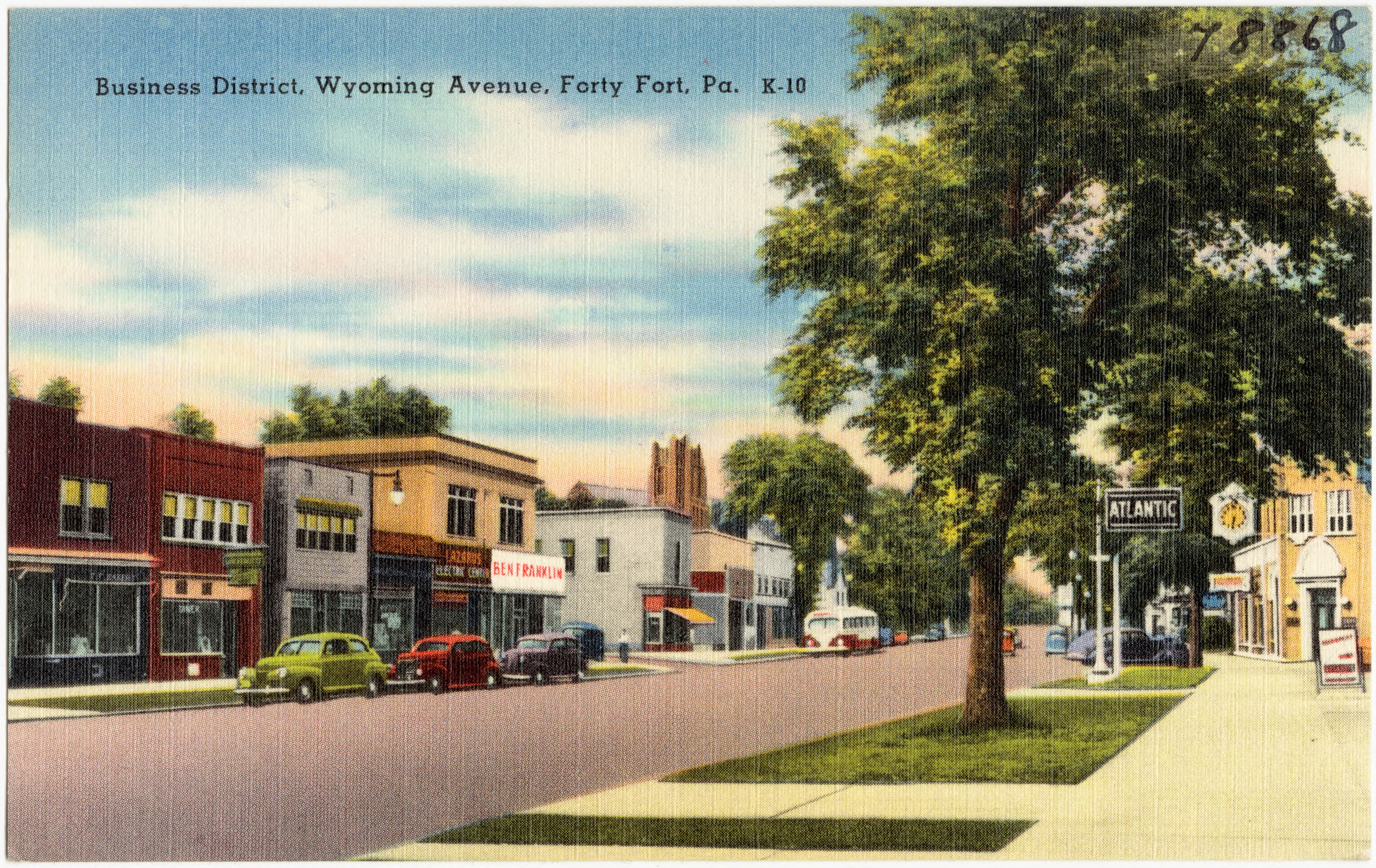
US 11 in Forty Fort (circa 1940)

== Geography ==
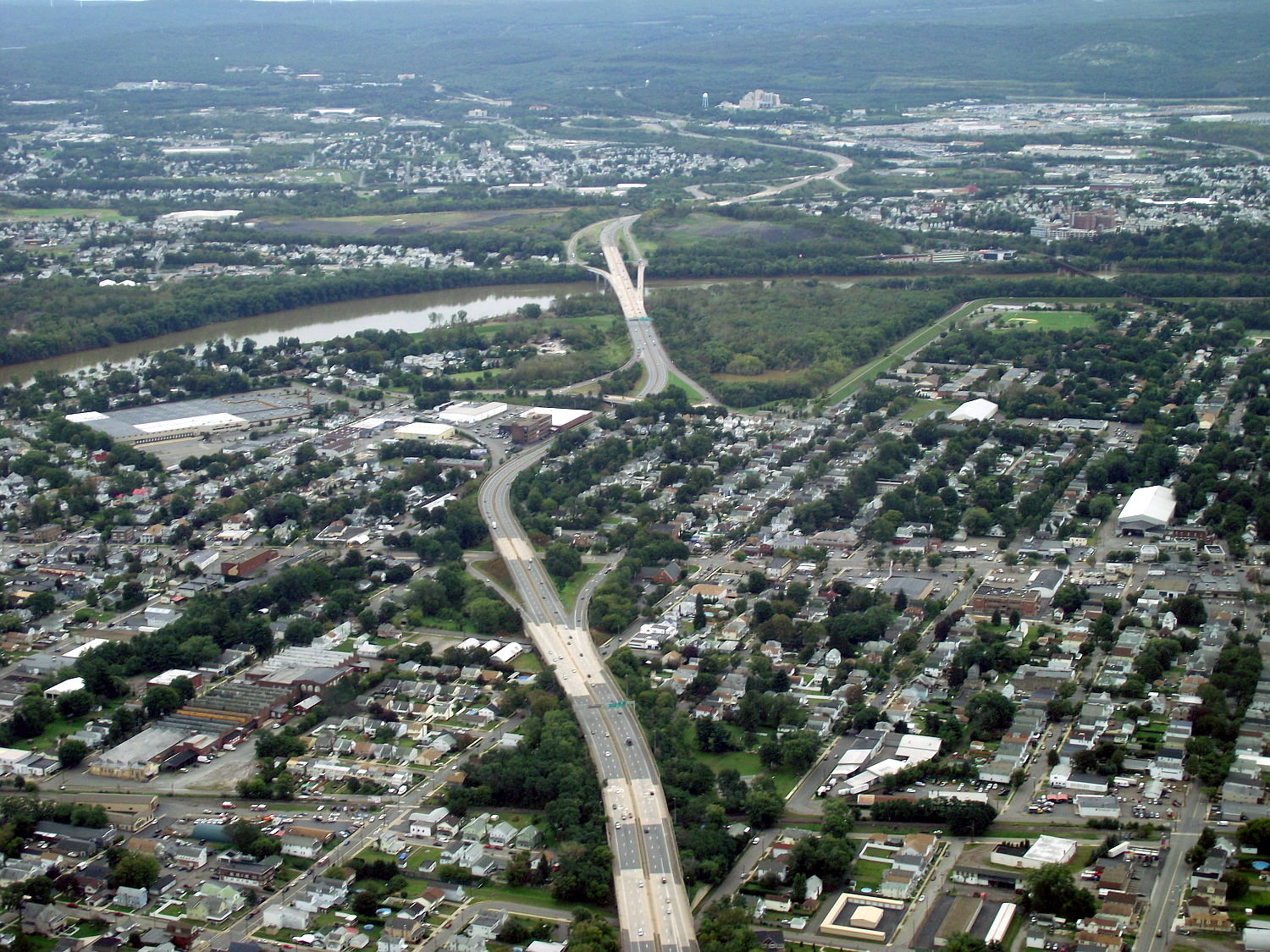
Aerial view of southern Forty Fort (on left) and surrounding communities

According to the United States Census Bureau, the borough has a total area of 1.6 square miles (4.1 km^{2}), of which 1.3 square miles (3.4 km^{2}) is land and 0.27 square miles (0.7 km^{2}) of it, or 16.58%, is water. Forty Fort hugs the western bank of the Susquehanna River just north of Wilkes-Barre.

Its neighbors are Wyoming (to the north), Plains Township (to the east), Kingston (to the south), and Swoyersville (to the west). Forty Fort is built on a floodplain and is protected by a levee system. In the 1972 flood, the levee broke and the neighboring Susquehanna River flooded much of the town. During the 2011 flood, the levee system was once again put to the test. However, this time it held, and the borough was preserved.

== Demographics ==
Historical population
Census	Pop.	Note	%±
1880	478		—
1890	1,031		115.7%
1900	1,557		51.0%
1910	2,353		51.1%
1920	3,389		44.0%
1930	6,224		83.7%
1940	6,293		1.1%
1950	6,173		−1.9%
1960	6,431		4.2%
1970	6,114		−4.9%
1980	5,590		−8.6%
1990	5,049		−9.7%
2000	4,579		−9.3%
2010	4,214		−8.0%
2020	4,239		0.6%
2021 (est.)	4,225	▼	−0.3%

=== 2020 census ===
As of the 2020 census, Forty Fort had a population of 4,239. The median age was 43.6 years. 17.8% of residents were under the age of 18 and 21.3% of residents were 65 years of age or older. For every 100 females there were 91.3 males, and for every 100 females age 18 and over there were 88.0 males age 18 and over.

100.0% of residents lived in urban areas, while 0.0% lived in rural areas.

There were 1,904 households in Forty Fort, of which 22.2% had children under the age of 18 living in them. Of all households, 42.2% were married-couple households, 19.3% were households with a male householder and no spouse or partner present, and 29.8% were households with a female householder and no spouse or partner present. About 33.3% of all households were made up of individuals and 15.0% had someone living alone who was 65 years of age or older.

There were 2,061 housing units, of which 7.6% were vacant. The homeowner vacancy rate was 1.5% and the rental vacancy rate was 5.9%.

Racial composition as of the 2020 census
Race	Number	Percent
White	3,836	90.5%
Black or African American	81	1.9%
American Indian and Alaska Native	3	0.1%
Asian	42	1.0%
Native Hawaiian and Other Pacific Islander	4	0.1%
Some other race	72	1.7%
Two or more races	201	4.7%
Hispanic or Latino (of any race)	188	4.4%

=== 2000 census ===
As of the census of 2000, there were 4,579 people, 1,989 households, and 1,261 families residing in the borough. The population density was 3,418.3 inhabitants per square mile (1,319.8/km^{2}). There were 2,098 housing units at an average density of 1,566.2 per square mile (604.7/km^{2}). The racial makeup of the borough was 98.47% White, 0.50% African American, 0.07% Native American, 0.37% Asian, 0.17% from other races, and 0.41% from two or more races. Hispanic or Latino of any race were 0.52% of the population.

There were 1,989 households, out of which 25.7% had children under the age of 18 living with them, 50.6% were married couples living together, 10.1% had a female householder with no husband present, and 36.6% were non-families. 32.4% of all households were made up of individuals, and 14.8% had someone living alone who was 65 years of age or older. The average household size was 2.29 and the average family size was 2.94.

In the borough the population was spread out, with 20.5% under the age of 18, 7.2% from 18 to 24, 27.6% from 25 to 44, 25.1% from 45 to 64, and 19.6% who were 65 years of age or older. The median age was 42 years. For every 100 females, there were 86.4 males. For every 100 females age 18 and over, there were 81.9 males.

The median income for a household in the borough was $40,306, and the median income for a family was $50,667. Males had a median income of $36,696 versus $29,199 for females. The per capita income for the borough was $20,558. About 5.4% of families and 6.0% of the population were below the poverty line, including 8.7% of those under age 18 and 3.2% of those age 65 or over.

== Government ==
Forty Fort has a mayor/council form of government. The borough's council consists of seven elected members. Elections are split every two years (where almost half the council is up for election). At first, the mayor and three council seats are up for election. Two years later, the other four council seats are up for election. This cycle repeats itself. The council acts as the legislative branch. Should the office of mayor or a seat on the borough council be vacant, the council will appoint a person to fill the vacancy.

The mayor is elected at-large to a four-year term. The mayor is primarily responsible for the public safety of the borough. One function of the office is to serve as spokesperson for the community and represent the borough at civic and social events. The mayor also reviews each ordinance enacted by the borough council; and can sign the ordinance, veto it, or permit it to become law without signature. The mayor also has the authority to break a tie vote on borough council. Other various functions of the office include performing wedding ceremonies and administering oaths.

Brian Thomas was appointed mayor by the borough council in January 2022, following the resignation of the previous mayor. He was elect to a shortened term in 2023.

== Education ==
Forty Fort is part of the Wyoming Valley West School District. There are three schools located in Forty Fort:

- Dana Street Elementary Center, a public elementary school (part of Wyoming Valley West School District)
- Wyoming Seminary Lower School, a private school suited for pre-K to eighth grade
- Apple Tree Nursery and Primary School, a private school

== Infrastructure ==
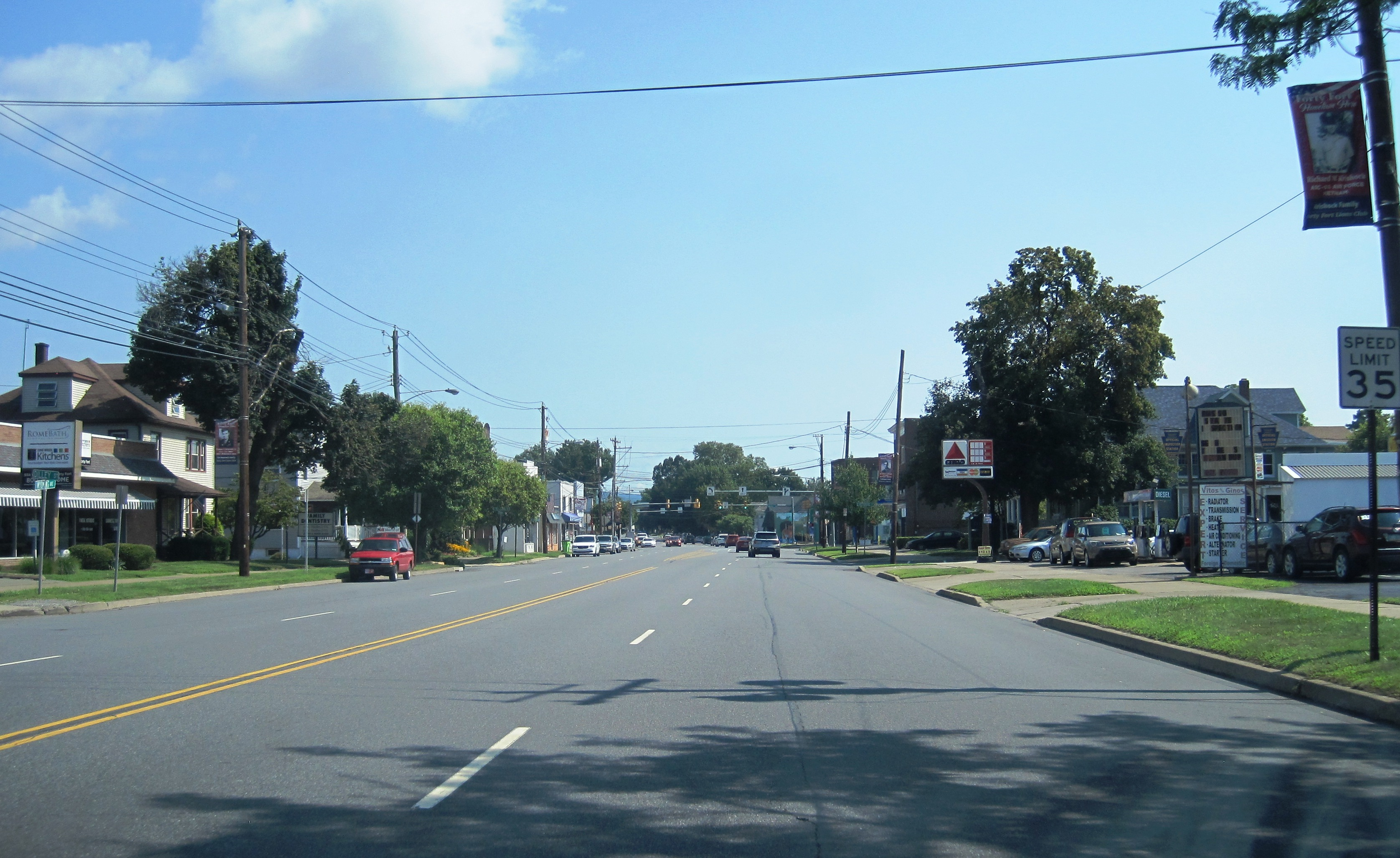
U.S. Route 11 (Wyoming Avenue) in Forty Fort

=== Transportation ===
U.S. Route 11 (Wyoming Avenue) runs from Wyoming, through Forty Fort, and into Kingston. PA 309 runs through the southern end of Forty Fort. The borough is also home to the southern edge of the Wilkes-Barre Wyoming Valley Airport, a public facility serving mainly general aviation aircraft. The rest of the airport is in Wyoming.

== In popular culture ==
Following the lawsuits related to the 2020 United States presidential election, the town appeared in the season finale of the Last Week Tonight with John Oliver where host John Oliver jokingly reinvented the story on the origin of the Forty Fort's name.
