= Wyoming Valley West High School =

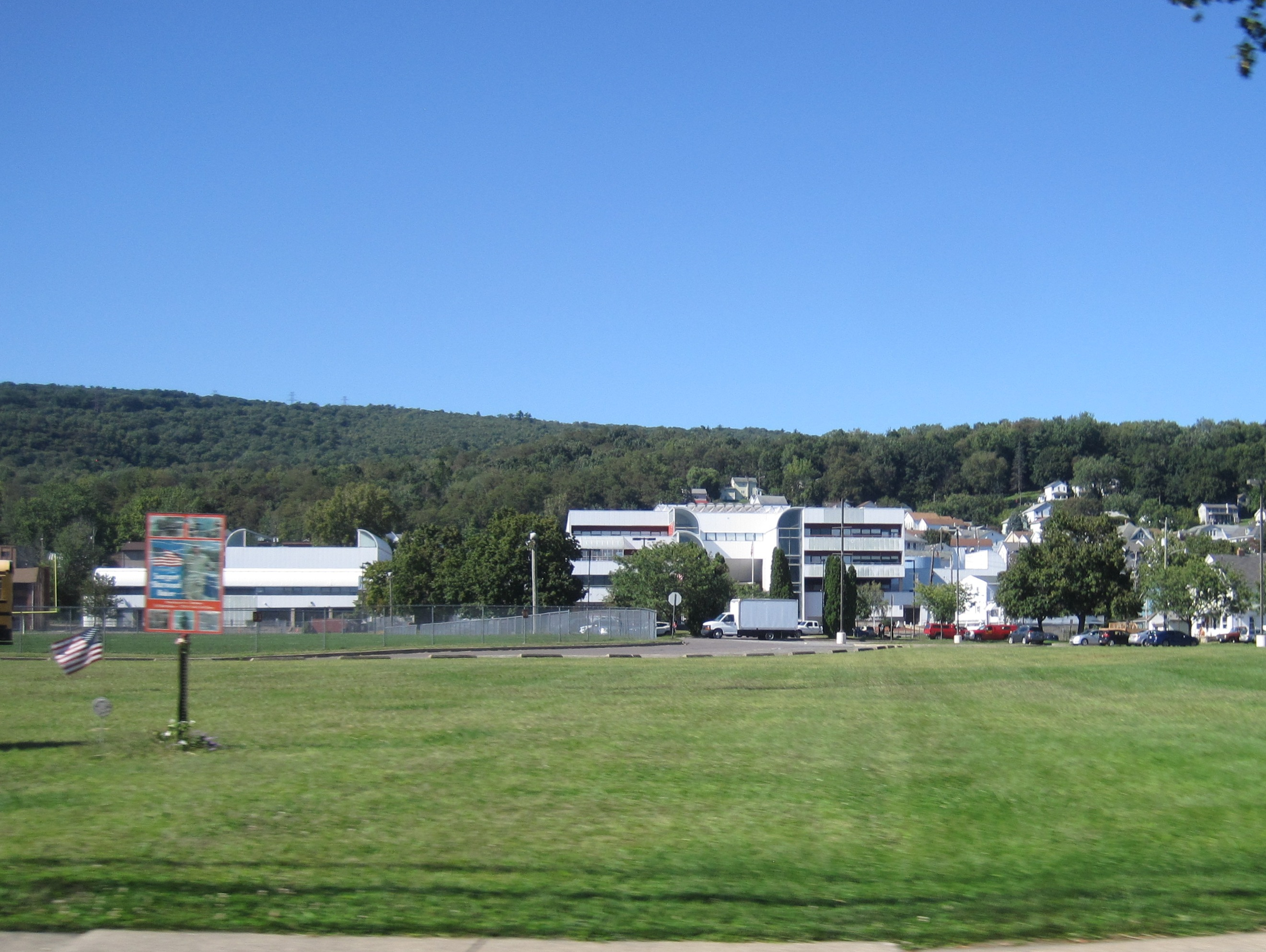

Location
- 150 Wadham Street; Plymouth, Luzerne County, Pennsylvania 18651-2199; United States
- Coordinates: 41.241342°N 75.948875°W

Information
- School type: Public high school
- NCES District ID: 4225950
- School code: PA-118409302-6391
- CEEB code: 392025
- NCES School ID: 422595006391
- Principal: Tara A. Carey
- Faculty: 85 (on an FTE basis)
- Grades: 9–12
- Enrollment: 1,357 (2022–2023)
  - Grade 9: 341
  - Grade 10: 377
  - Grade 11: 305
  - Grade 12: 334
- Student to teacher ratio: 15.96:1
- Campus type: Suburb: large
- Colors: Burgundy and gold
- Athletics conference: PIAA District 2
- Nickname: Spartans
- USNWR ranking: 13,242–17,655
- Newspaper: The West Side Story
- Website: hs.wvwsd.org

Wyoming Valley West High School is a public high school in Plymouth, Pennsylvania, United States. It is the only public high school in the Wyoming Valley West School District. The school building dates to 1978. With 1,357 students and 85 (on an FTE basis) teachers, Wyoming Valley West High School's student-to-teacher ratio is 15.96:1. The student body is 61% white and 39% non-white.

== Athletics ==
The school's teams are nicknamed "Spartans" after the ancient Greek city-state. Wyoming Valley West is in PIAA District 2. The Wyoming Valley West field hockey team defeated Palmyra 2–1 in the 2019 PIAA Class "AA" Championship.

=== AAA sports ===
- Boys'/girls' cross country
- Boys'/girls' soccer
- Boys'/girls' swimming and diving
- Boys'/girls' tennis
- Boys'/girls' track and field
- Boys'/girls' volleyball
- Boys' wrestling
- Girls' field hockey

=== AAAA sports ===
- Boys' baseball
- Girls' softball
- Boys'/girls' basketball
- Boys' football
- Boys' golf
- Boys'/girls' indoor track and field
- Boys'/girls' water polo

== Notable alumni ==
- Karen Aqua – filmmaker and animator
- Jimy Hettes – professional MMA fighter, Ultimate Fighting Championship
- Aaron Kaufer – former member of the Pennsylvania House of Representatives
- Kait Kerrigan – playwright, lyricist, book writer
- Warren Lahr – drafted by Pittsburgh Steelers, played 11 seasons with Cleveland Browns
- Kate Moran – oceanographer and Officer of the Order of Canada
- Alec Ryncavage – member of the Pennsylvania House of Representatives
- Jeffrey J. Selingo – author, journalist
