= Forty Fort Meetinghouse =

Historic church in Pennsylvania, United States

- U.S. National Register of Historic Places
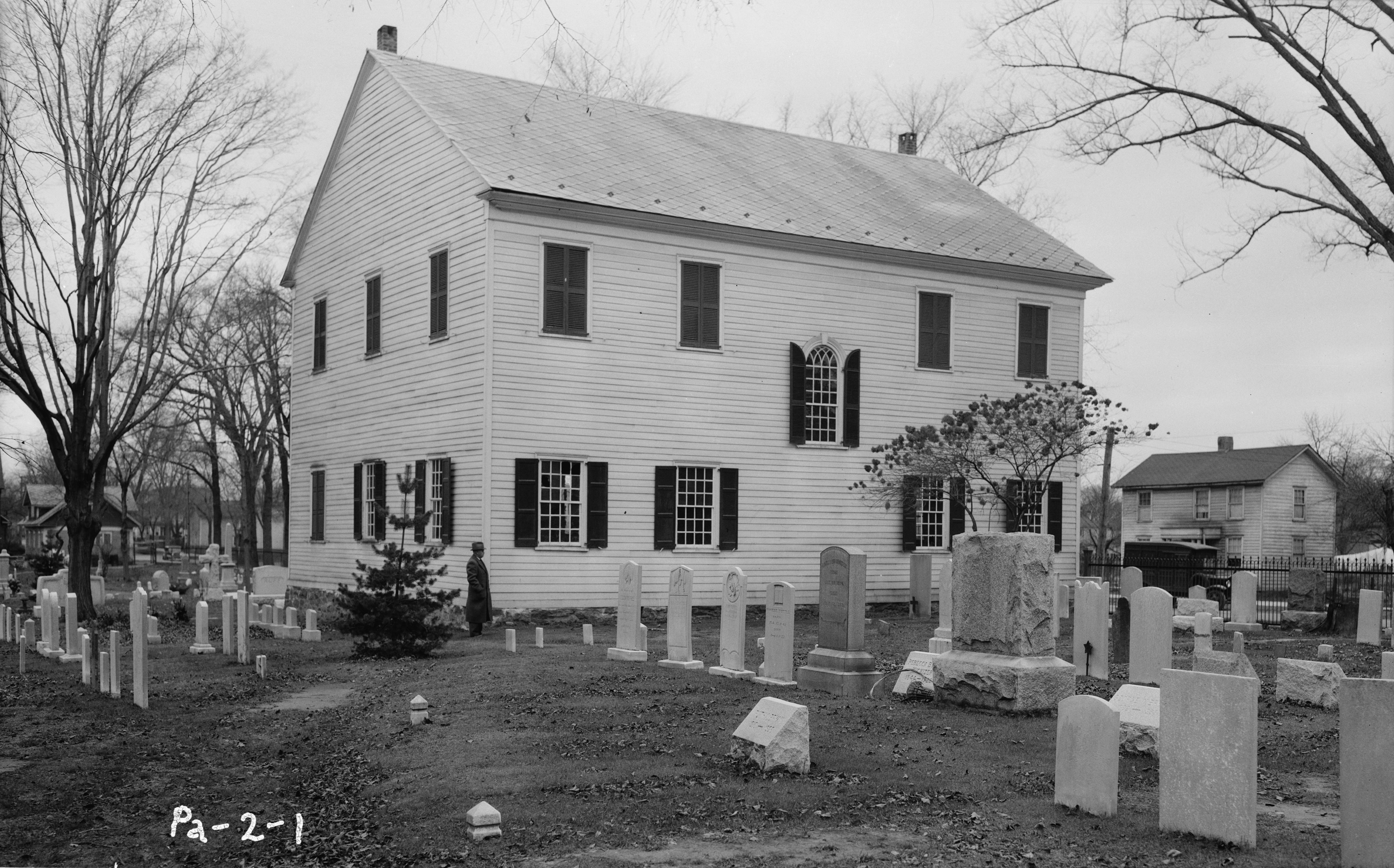
- Forty Fort Meetinghouse, HABS Photo, November 1934

- Location within Pennsylvania Location within the United States
- Location: River St. and Wyoming Ave., Forty Fort, Pennsylvania
- Coordinates: 41°17′4″N 75°52′18″W
- Area: 0.1 acres (0.040 ha)
- Built: 1807
- Architect: Hitchcock, Joseph; Underwood, Gideon
- Architectural style: New England meeting house
- NRHP reference No.: 88002373
- Added to NRHP: November 3, 1988

Forty Fort Meetinghouse is a historic meeting house at River Street and Wyoming Avenue in the Old Forty Fort Cemetery in Forty Fort, Luzerne County, Pennsylvania. It was built in 1806–08 in a New England meeting house style with white clapboard siding and was added to the National Register of Historic Places in 1988.

== History ==
The first European settler in the area came from Connecticut in the late 18th century. In 1768 public lands were set aside in the area for churches by the Susquehanna Company, but because of the Yankee-Pennamite Wars and the American Revolution actual building of the churches was delayed by over 30 years. An unfinished meetinghouse nearby was destroyed after the Battle of Wyoming in 1778.

Joseph Hitchcock of New Haven, Connecticut, who also designed the Old Ship Zion Church in Wilkes-Barre, designed the meetinghouse. It was the first completed church used for religious services in the area. It was a Union Church with both Congregationalist (now Presbyterians) and Methodists worshipping in the church. By 1837, both groups had built their own churches, and the meetinghouse has been used rarely since. In 1869, the Forty Fort Cemetery Association was created by the Pennsylvania state legislature and the Association still owns the church and cemetery.

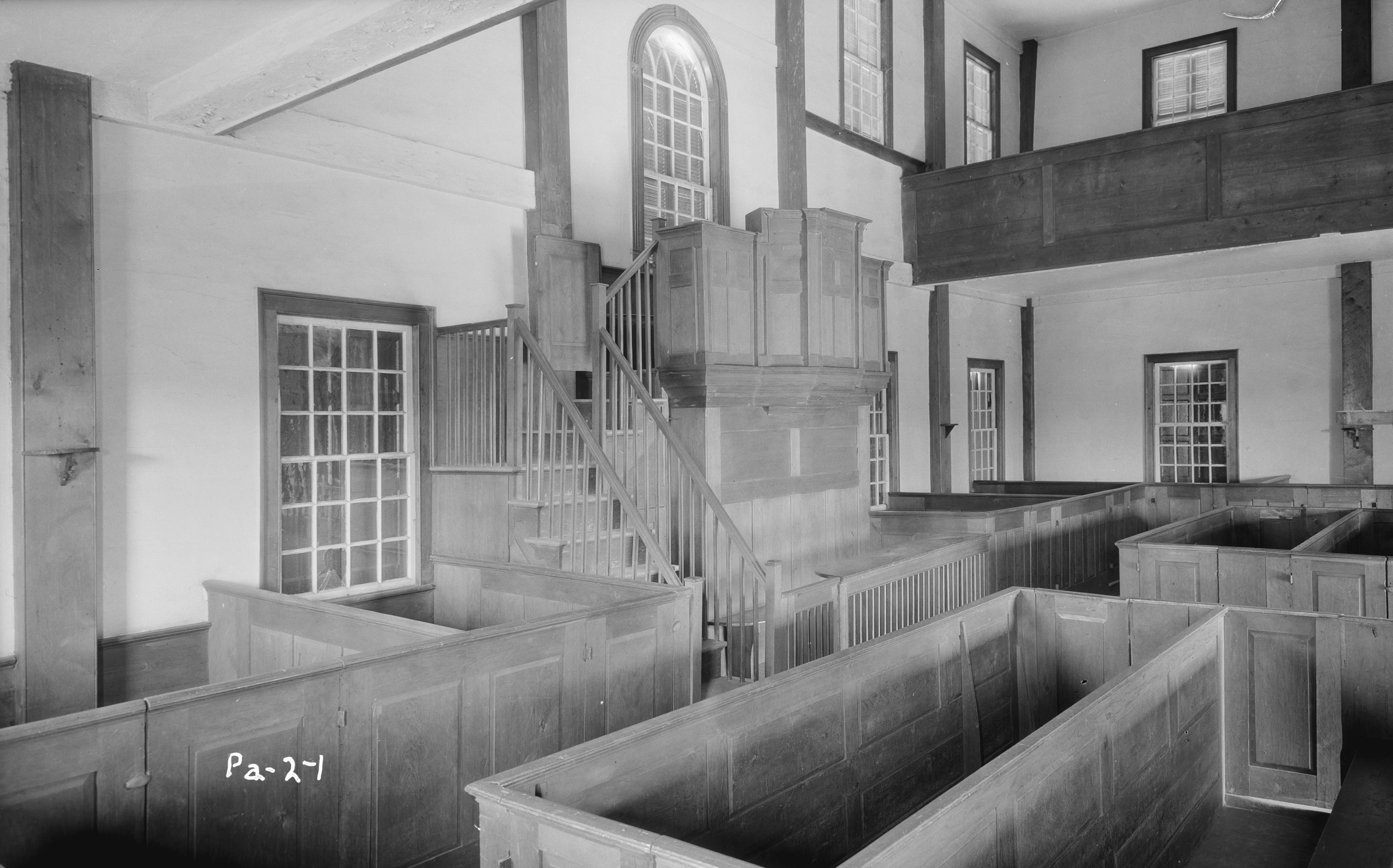
Interior of the meetinghouse, looking toward the pulpit

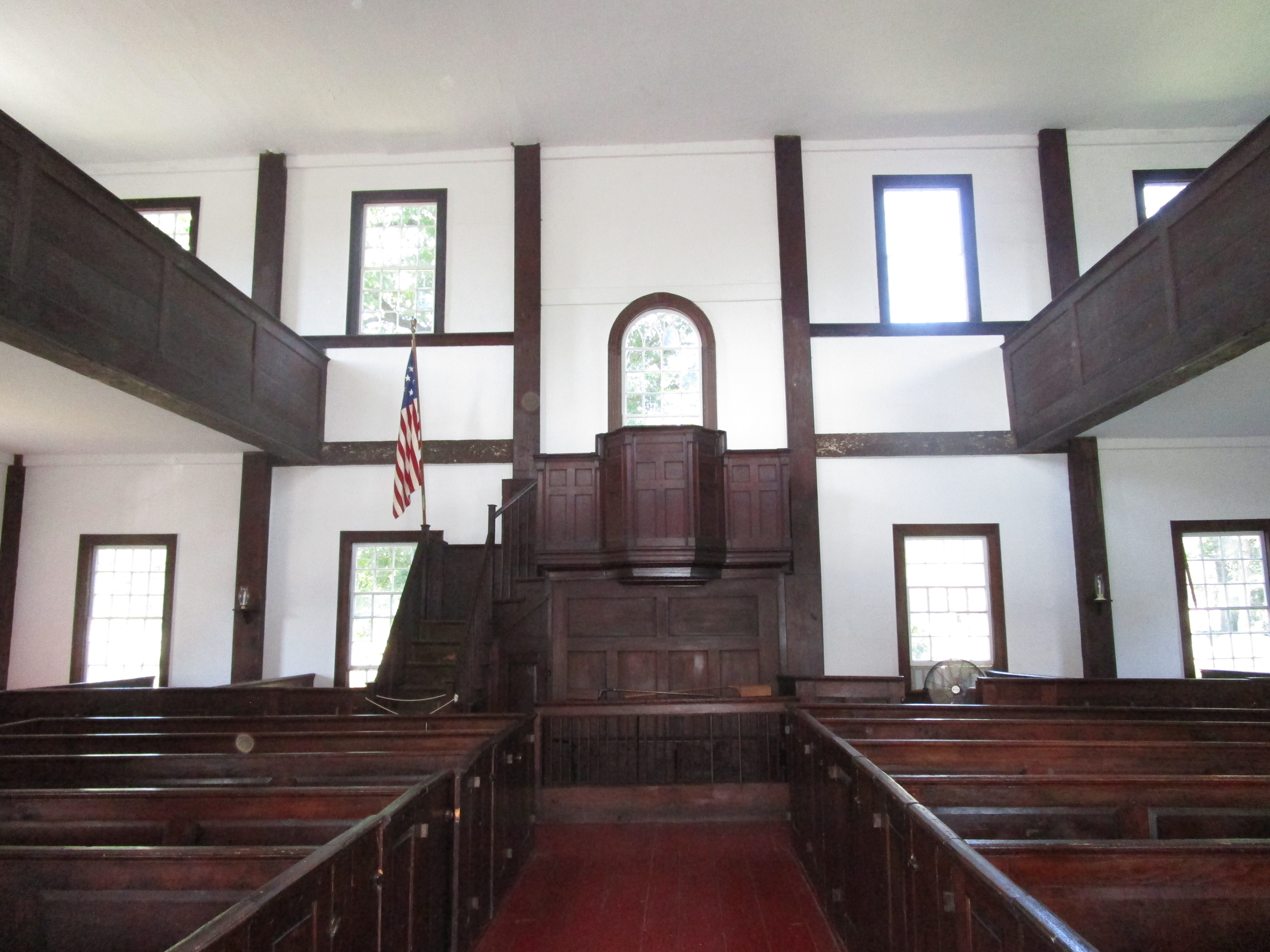
Interior of the meetinghouse
