= Alec Ryncavage =

American politician

Member of the Pennsylvania House of Representatives from the 119th district
- Incumbent
- Assumed office January 3, 2023
- Preceded by: Gerald Mullery

Personal details
- Born: March 27, 2001 (age 25) Pennsylvania, U.S.
- Party: Republican
- Education: Wyoming Valley West High School
- Website: repryncavage.com

Alec Joseph Ryncavage (born March 27, 2001) is an American businessman and politician. He is a Republican member of the Pennsylvania House of Representatives, representing the 119th District since 2023.

== Early life and career ==
Ryncavage was born on March 27, 2001, in Pennsylvania, to Danielle and David Ryncavage, Sr. He was raised Catholic. While still in junior high school, Ryncavage became a freelance web developer, creating his own anti-virus software at age 14. He later founded his own cybersecurity company, CYBIOT.

Ryncavage graduated from Wyoming Valley West High School in 2019.

== Political career ==
In 2019, Ryncavage ran for a seat on the Borough Council of Plymouth, Pennsylvania. His platform included fiscal conservatism and community revitalization. He won, becoming at age 18 the youngest person ever elected to the council.

In 2022, Ryncavage announced his intention to run for Pennsylvania State Representative from the 119th District and replace retiring State Representative Gerald Mullery. He won the Republican primary election and went on to defeat Democratic candidate Vito Malacari in the general election. At 21 years of age, Ryncavage was the youngest member of the House and the youngest person elected since Michael Cassidy in 1976. In the 2024 election, he won with a two-to-one margin against Democratic challenger Megan Kocher.

== Political positions ==
Ryncavage defines himself as a "moderate Republican" who grew up in a Democratic family in a heavily Democratic hometown.

=== Abortion ===
Ryncavage describes himself as "personally pro-life," but according to himself, has "never supported an outright ban on abortion." He supports exceptions to abortion bans for rape, incest, and protecting the life of the mother. He has indicated support for limiting abortions after 16 to 20 weeks of pregnancy as opposed to Pennsylvania's current limit at 24 weeks. Ryncavage opposes late-term abortions and taxpayer-funded abortions.

=== Criminal justice and policing ===
Ryncavage opposes defunding the police. When running for Plymouth Borough Council, he voiced support for stricter code enforcement. During his time on council, he advocated for hiring more police officers.

In 2022, Ryncavage supported the passage of the Officer John Wilding Law, which made it a felony should bodily harm come to a law enforcement officer as a result of a suspect fleeing arrest.

=== Education ===
Ryncavage supports school choice and advocates for shifting some state funding from schools to individual students to increase access to private schools. He has said, "I'm not advocating for defunding public schools. ... I just think there needs to be a little bit more competition. If you want the quality of education to increase, if you want the price per student cost to decrease, you need to introduce competition."

=== Elections ===
Ryncavage supports voter ID and banning no-excuse mail-in ballots. To lessen concerns about voter fraud, Ryncavage opposes the use of ballot drop boxes but does not believe that there have ever been previous instances of mass voter fraud. In 2024, Ryncavage signed a discharge petition that would force a vote in the State House on a proposed amendment to the Pennsylvania Constitution that would require voter ID.

He supports the implementation of open primary elections as a way to deter political extremism.

=== Emergency powers and religious gatherings ===
In 2024, Ryncavage announced plans to propose legislation permitting religious gatherings during an emergency declaration. The bill came as a response to prohibitions against large public gatherings, including religious services, during the COVID-19 pandemic.

=== Environmental policy ===
Ryncavage opposes the Regional Greenhouse Gas Initiative (RGGI) and is against banning natural gas.

Ryncavage wants more state and federal government cooperation to clean up old mining sites. He also supports tax credits and incentives for private businesses to reclaim mine land.

=== Gun rights ===
Ryncavage supports constitutional carry and is a member of the National Rifle Association of America (NRA). He is concerned with red flag laws potentially violating due process.

=== LGBTQ+ ===
In 2023, Ryncavage and Representative Aaron Kaufer were the only two Republicans in the State House to vote for an LGBTQ+ anti-discrimination bill. He defended his vote, saying the passage of the bill would deter the state government's implementation of more "radical" measures.

=== Cannabis ===
Ryncavage supports the legalization of cannabis under a "live and let live" philosophy that "empower[s] individuals to make choices about their own lives, as long as those choices do not harm others," provided the state implements sufficient regulatory system in conjunction. He would also support using cannabis-sourced tax revenue to fund state services.

=== Taxation ===
Ryncavage supports the elimination of property taxes and supports expanding the homestead tax exemption; he is willing to offset the loss in revenue by increasing sales tax.

== Electoral history ==
2019 Plymouth Borough Council election
Party	Candidate	Votes	%
Democratic	Bill Dixon	690	28.51
Democratic	John Z. Thomas	667	27.56
Republican	Alec J. Ryncavage	592	24.46
Democratic	Adam Morehart	454	18.76
Write-in		17	0.70
Total votes		2,420	100.00%

2022 Pennsylvania House of Representatives Republican primary election, District 119
Party	Candidate	Votes	%
Republican	Alec J. Ryncavage	3,378	54.47
Republican	Tom Williams	2,816	45.40
Write-in		8	0.13
Total votes		6,202	100.00%

2022 Pennsylvania House of Representatives election, District 119
Party	Candidate	Votes	%
Republican	Alec J. Ryncavage	12,183	55.45
Democratic	Vito Malacari	9,772	44.47
Write-in		17	0.08
Total votes		21,972	100.00%
Republican gain from Democratic			

2024 Pennsylvania House of Representatives election, District 119
Party	Candidate	Votes	%
Republican	Alec Ryncavage (incumbent)	18,031	62.86
Democratic	Megan Kocher	10,623	37.03
Write-in		16	0.06
Total votes		28,670	100.00
