= Pennsylvania House of Representatives, District 119 =

American legislative district

Pennsylvania's 119th State House of Representatives district
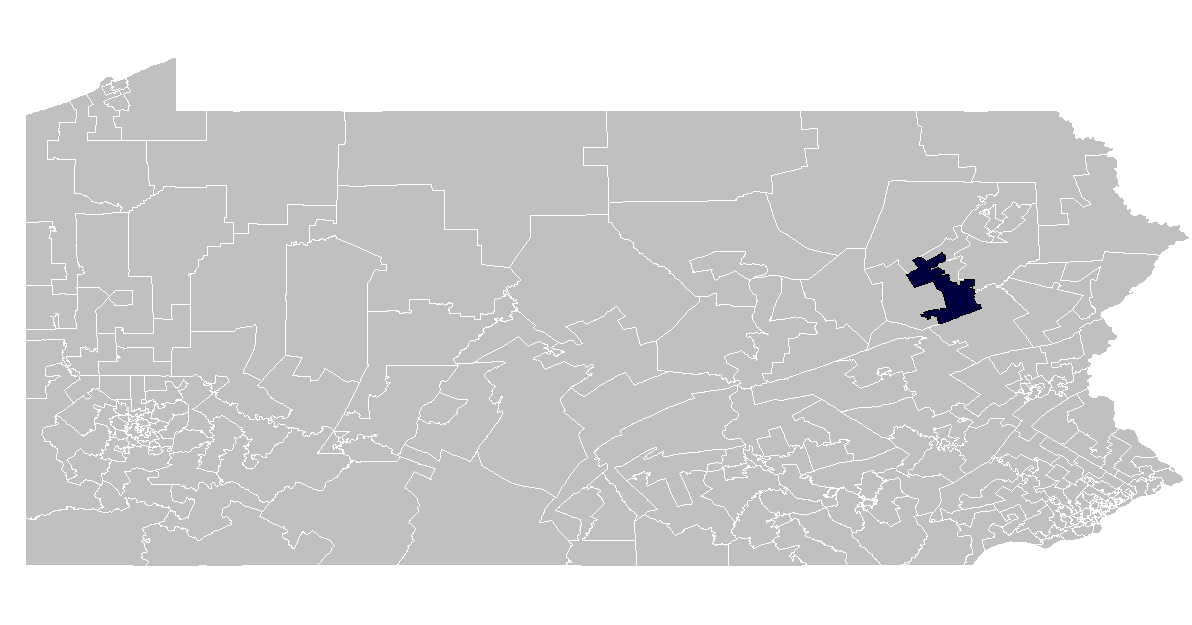
Representative
| Alec Ryncavage; R–Plymouth |
- Demographics: 92.4% White; 2.3% Black; 5.8% Hispanic
- Population (2011) • Citizens of voting age: 63,187; 50,251

The 119th Pennsylvania House of Representatives District is located in Luzerne County and has been represented by Alec Ryncavage since 2023. The 119th district includes the following areas:

- Ashley
- Edwardsville
- Fairview Township
- Hanover Township
- Larksville
- Nanticoke
- Newport Township
- Plymouth
- Plymouth Township
- Rice Township
- Sugar Notch
- Warrior Run
- Wright Township

== Representatives ==
| Representative | Party | Years | District home | Note |
Prior to 1969, seats were apportioned by county.
| Fred J. Shupnik | Democrat | 1969 – 1982 | | |
| Stanley J. Jarolin | Democrat | 1983 – 1998 | | |
| John T. Yudichak | Democrat | 1999 – 2010 | | |
| Gerald J. Mullery | Democrat | 2011 – 2023 | | |
| Alec Ryncavage | Republican | 2023 – present | | Incumbent |

== Recent election results ==
PA House election, 2010: Pennsylvania House, District 119
| Party | Candidate | Votes | % | ±% |
|---|---|---|---|---|
| Democratic | Gerald J. Mullery | 8,631 | 51.85 | |
| Republican | Rick Arnold | 7,274 | 43.7 | |
| Libertarian | Brian Bergman | 741 | 4.45 | |
| Margin of victory | | 1,357 | 8.5 | |
| Turnout | | 16,646 | 100 | |

PA House election, 2012: Pennsylvania House, District 119
| Party | Candidate | Votes | % | ±% |
|---|---|---|---|---|
| Democratic | Gerald J. Mullery | 13,132 | 60.83 | |
| Republican | Rick Arnold | 8,456 | 39.17 | |
| Margin of victory | | 4,676 | 21.66 | ▲13.16 |
| Turnout | | 21,588 | 100 | |

PA House election, 2014: Pennsylvania House, District 119
| Party | Candidate | Votes | % | ±% |
|---|---|---|---|---|
| Democratic | Gerald J. Mullery | 9,955 | 100 | |
| Margin of victory | | | | |
| Turnout | | | 100 | |

PA House election, 2016: Pennsylvania House, District 119
| Party | Candidate | Votes | % | ±% |
|---|---|---|---|---|
| Democratic | Gerald J. Mullery | 13,760 | 56.24 | |
| Republican | Justin Behrens | 10,707 | 43.76 | |
| Margin of victory | | 3,053 | 12.48 | |
| Turnout | | 16,813 | 100 | |
