= Fred Shupnik =

American politician

Fred J. Shupnik

Member of the Pennsylvania House of Representatives from the 119th district
- In office 1969–1982
- Preceded by: District created
- Succeeded by: Stanley Jarolin

Member of the Pennsylvania House of Representatives from the Luzerne County district
- In office 1959–1968

Personal details
- Born: November 18, 1916 Swoyersville, Pennsylvania
- Died: July 15, 1997 (aged 80) Luzerne, Pennsylvania
- Party: Democratic

Fred J. Shupnik (November 18, 1916 – July 15, 1997) was a former Democratic member of the Pennsylvania House of Representatives.
