= Packy Rogers =

American baseball player (1913-1998)

- Infielder
- Born: April 26, 1913; Swoyersville, Pennsylvania, U.S.
- Died: May 15, 1998 (aged 85); Elmira, New York, U.S.
- Batted: Right Threw: Right

MLB debut
- July 12, 1938, for the Brooklyn Dodgers

Last MLB appearance
- September 7, 1938, for the Brooklyn Dodgers

MLB statistics
- Batting average: .189
- Home runs: 0
- Run batted in: 5
- Stats at Baseball Reference

Teams
- Brooklyn Dodgers (1938)

Stanley Frank "Packy" Rogers, born Hazinski (April 26, 1913 – May 15, 1998), was an American professional baseball player, manager and scout. An infielder, he appeared in 23 games for the 1938 Brooklyn Dodgers. The native of Swoyersville, Pennsylvania, threw and batted right-handed, stood 5 feet 8 inches (1.73 m) tall and weighed 175 pounds (79 kg). He attended Fordham University.

Rogers' professional career began in 1936 included all or parts of 14 seasons as an active player. During his 23-game stint with Brooklyn, he collected seven hits, with three of them coming in his MLB debut on July 12, 1938, against the New York Giants at Ebbets Field. Rogers, the Dodgers' starting third baseman that day, hit two singles and a triple with three runs batted in, collected a base on balls, and scored a run, as Brooklyn defeated its arch-rivals, 13–5.

Rogers served in the United States Navy in the Pacific during World War II, then managed in the low levels of the minor leagues, from 1947 to 1959. He also scouted for the Minnesota Twins, beginning in 1960 when the franchise was still the Washington Senators. He died in Elmira, New York, at age 85.
