= Denison House (Forty Fort, Pennsylvania) =

Historic house in Pennsylvania, United States

- U.S. National Register of Historic Places
- Pennsylvania state historical marker
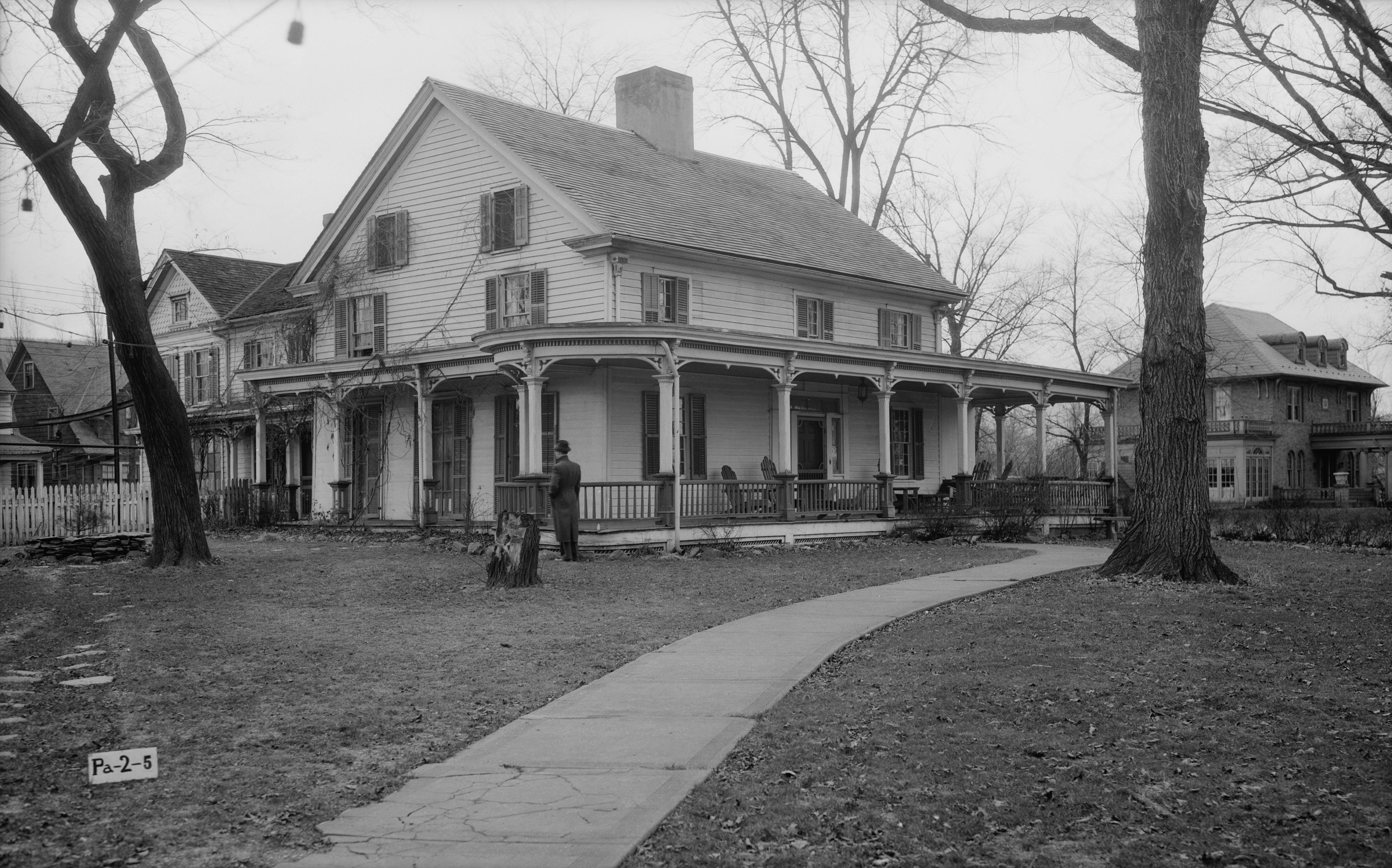
- Denison House, HABS photo, December 1934

- Location within Pennsylvania Location within the United States
- Location: 35 Denison St., Forty Fort, Pennsylvania
- Coordinates: 41°17′57″N 75°51′46″W
- Area: 6 acres (2.4 ha)
- Built: c. 1790
- Architectural style: New England central chimney
- NRHP reference No.: 70000550

Significant dates
- Added to NRHP: December 2, 1970
- Designated PHMC: May 23, 1972

Denison House, also known as the Colonel Nathan Denison House, is a historic home located at Forty Fort, Luzerne County, Pennsylvania. It was built about 1790, and is a 2 1/2-story, frame building with a central chimney in the New England style. A rear addition and full-width front porch were added in the mid-19th century. The house has since been restored to its appearance in the 1790s.

It was added to the National Register of Historic Places in 1970.

Col. Nathan Denison was a Revolutionary Officer and a Luzerne County Judge. The Denison House features a table on which the Articles of Capitulation were signed, surrendering Forty Fort to the British and ending the Battle of Wyoming.

The property is owned and maintained by the Luzerne County Historical Society. It is open for guided tours in the summer.

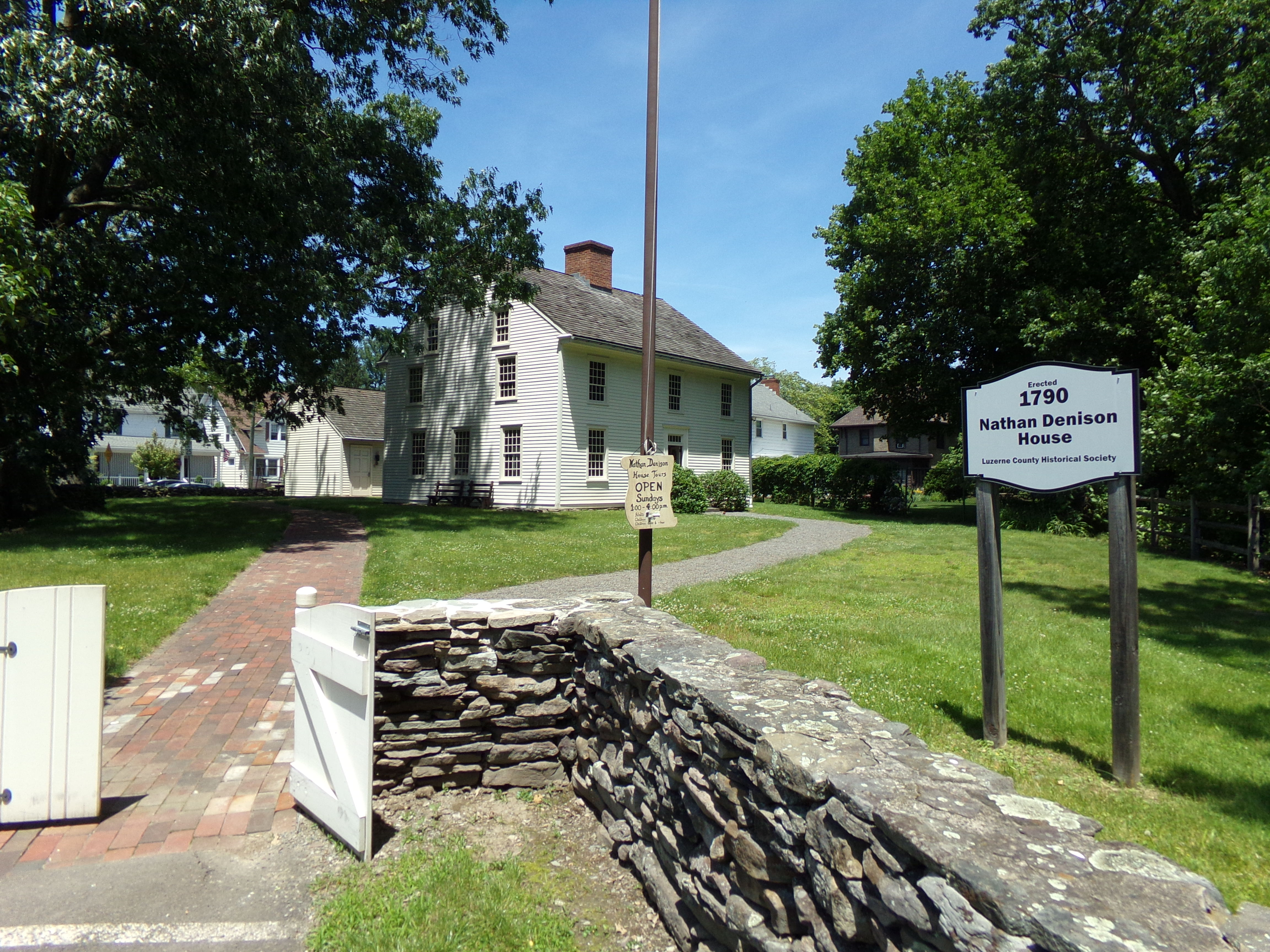
Nathan Denison House, Forty Fort, Pennsylvania (in 2017)

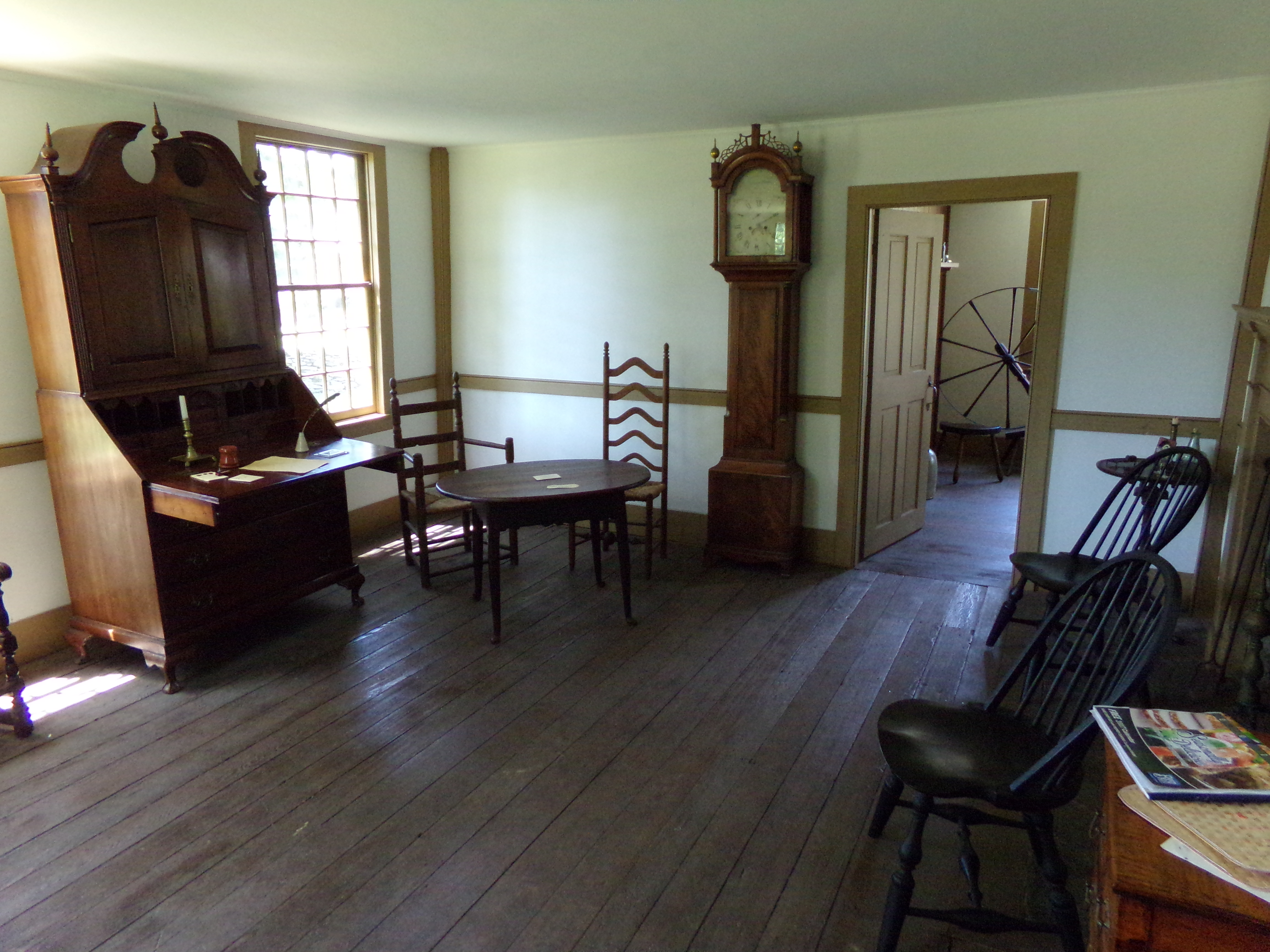
Inside the Nathan Denison House
