= Wilkes-Barre Wyoming Valley Airport =

Airport in Pennsylvania, U.S.

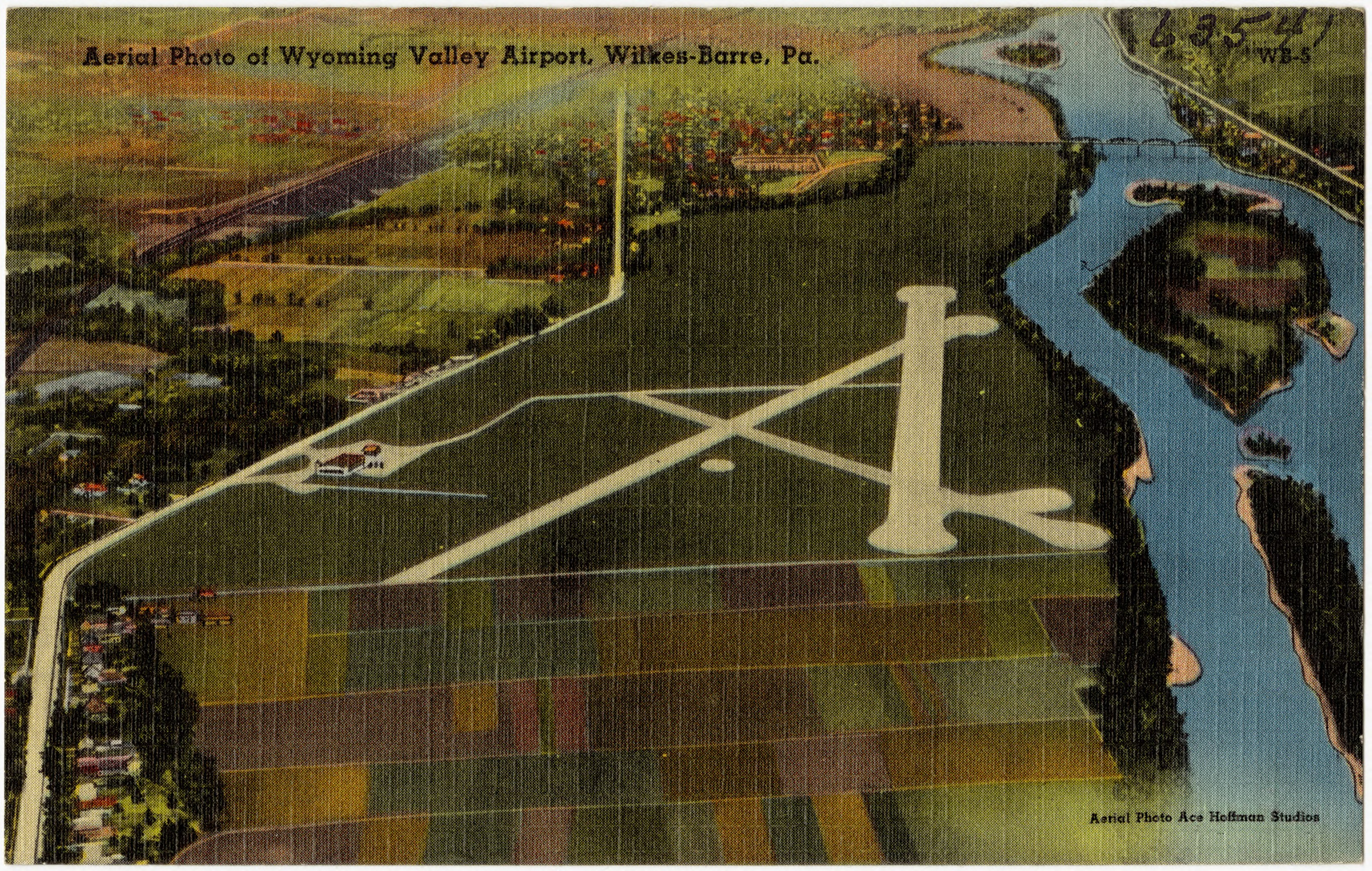
- Wilkes-Barre Wyoming Valley Airport in the early 20th century
- IATA: WBW; ICAO: KWBW; FAA LID: WBW

Summary
- Airport type: Public
- Owner: Luzerne County, Pennsylvania, U.S.
- Serves: Wilkes-Barre/Scranton metropolitan area (Wyoming Valley)
- Elevation AMSL: 543 ft / 166 m
- Coordinates: 41°17′50″N 075°51′08″W

Map
- Location of airport in Pennsylvania WBW (the United States)

Runways
Direction	Length		Surface
Direction	ft	m	Surface
7/25	3,375	1,029	Asphalt
9/27	2,191	668	Asphalt/Turf

Statistics (2011)
- Aircraft operations: 25,125
- Based aircraft: 51
- Source: Federal Aviation Administration

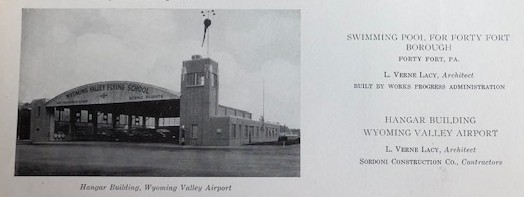

Wilkes-Barre Wyoming Valley Airport (IATA: WBW, ICAO: KWBW, FAA LID: WBW) is a county-owned, public airport located in Forty Fort and Wyoming in Luzerne County, Pennsylvania. The National Plan of Integrated Airport Systems for 2011–2015 categorized it as a general aviation facility. The primary airport of the Wilkes-Barre/Scranton metropolitan area is the Wilkes-Barre/Scranton International Airport (AVP).

== History ==
The airport was established in 1929. It came into the possession of Luzerne County in the 1940s. The original brick hangar was designed by Wilkes-Barre architect L. Verne Lacy, and constructed by Forty Fort contractor, Sordoni Construction Company, circa 1930.

== Facilities ==
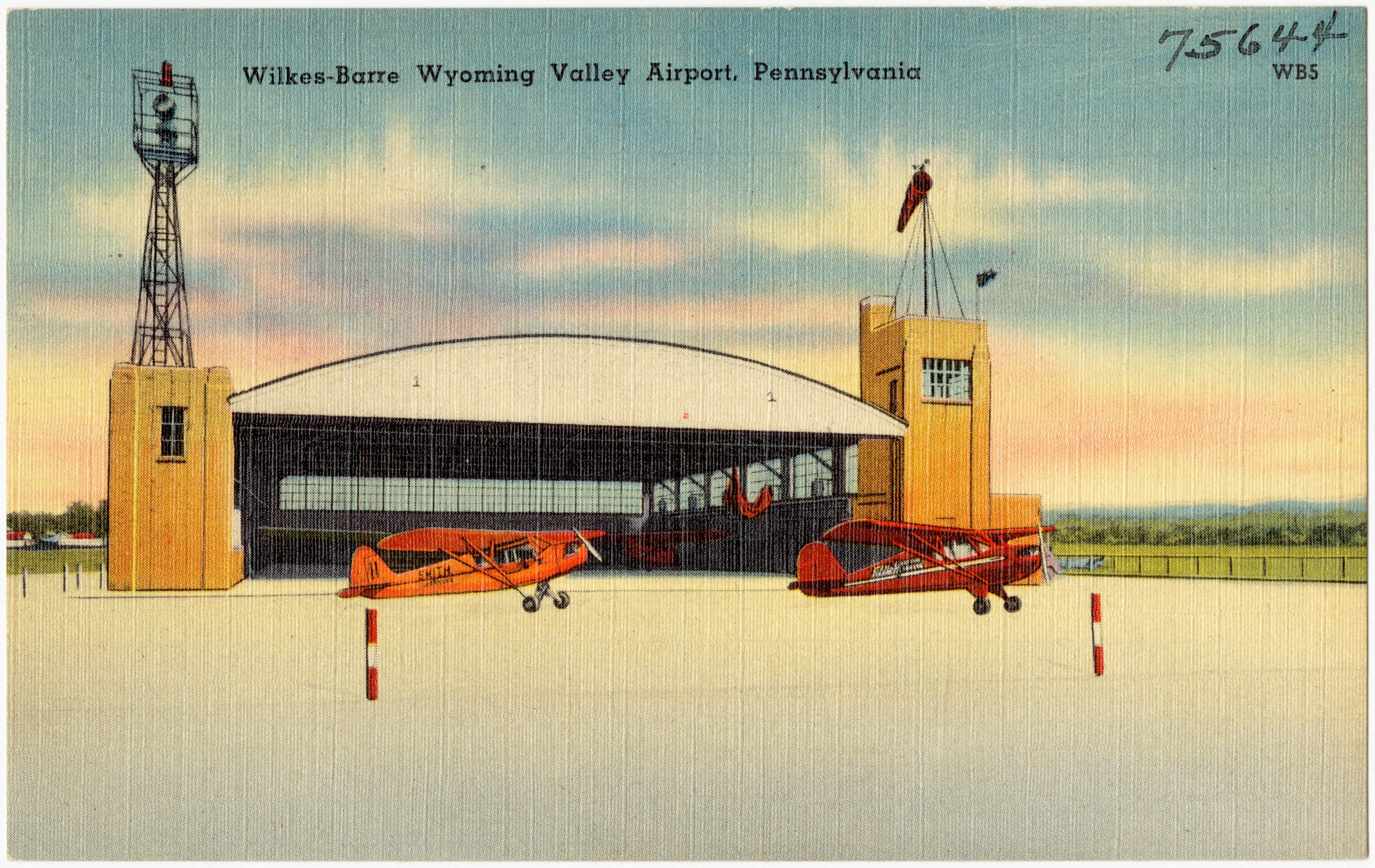
A postcard of the airport

The airport covers 135 acres (55 ha) at an elevation of 543 feet (166 m). It has two runways: 7/25 is 3,375 by 75 feet (1,029 × 23 m) asphalt; 9/27 is 2,191 by 100 feet (668 × 30 m) asphalt and turf.

In 2011, the airport had 25,125 aircraft operations, average 68 per day: 99.5% general aviation, 0.3% military and 0.2% air taxi. 51 aircraft were then based at the airport: 98% single-engine and 2% multi-engine.

== See also ==
- List of airports in Pennsylvania
