= Steve Shemo =

American baseball player

- Second baseman
- Born: April 9, 1915; Swoyersville, Pennsylvania, U.S.
- Died: April 13, 1992 (aged 77); Eden, North Carolina, U.S.
- Batted: Right Threw: Right

MLB debut
- April 18, 1944, for the Boston Braves

Last MLB appearance
- July 16, 1945, for the Boston Braves

MLB statistics
- Batting average: .260
- Home runs: 0
- Runs batted in: 8
- Stats at Baseball Reference

Teams
- Boston Braves (1944–1945)

Stephen Michael Shemo (April 9, 1915 – April 13, 1992) was an American Major League Baseball second baseman who played for the Boston Braves in 1944 and 1945.

== Biography ==
A native of Swoyersville, Pennsylvania who was born on April 9, 1915, Shemo stood 5 ft 11 in (1.80 m) and weighed 175 lbs during his professional baseball career. One of many ballplayers who only appeared in the major leagues during World War II, he made his major league debut on April 18, 1944 (Opening Day) against the New York Giants at the Polo Grounds.

His last game for Boston was on July 16, 1945. A few days later, he was traded to the Indianapolis Indians of the minor league American Association, and never again returned to the major leagues.

Shemo's career totals included 35 games played, a .260 batting average (20-for-77), eight runs batted in, and seven runs scored. He appeared in more games at second base than at third base, but fielded better at third.

== Death ==
Shemo died on April 13, 1992 at the age of 77 in Eden, North Carolina.
