= Harry Dorish =

American baseball player (1921–2000)

Fritz Dorish
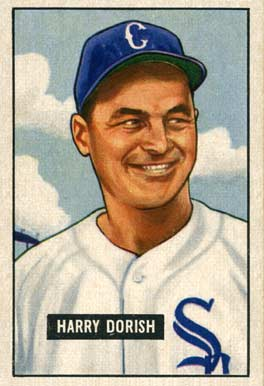
- Pitcher
- Born: July 13, 1921; Swoyersville, Pennsylvania, U.S.
- Died: December 31, 2000 (aged 79); Wilkes-Barre, Pennsylvania, U.S.
- Batted: Right Threw: Right

MLB debut
- April 15, 1947, for the Boston Red Sox

Last MLB appearance
- September 28, 1956, for the Boston Red Sox

MLB statistics
- Win–loss record: 45–43
- Earned run average: 3.83
- Strikeouts: 332
- Stats at Baseball Reference

Teams
- Boston Red Sox (1947–1949); St. Louis Browns (1950); Chicago White Sox (1951–1955); Baltimore Orioles (1955–1956); Boston Red Sox (1956)

Harry "Fritz" Dorish (July 13, 1921 – December 31, 2000) was an American professional baseball player. Born in Swoyersville, Pennsylvania, he was a right-handed pitcher over all or parts of ten Major League seasons (1947–56) with the Boston Red Sox, St. Louis Browns/Baltimore Orioles and Chicago White Sox. He was a United States Army veteran of World War II, where he served in the Pacific Theater of Operations.

Dorish was listed as 5 feet 11 inches (1.80 m) tall and 204 pounds (93 kg). For his big-league career, he compiled a 45–43 record in 323 appearances, mostly as a relief pitcher, with 48 saves, a 3.83 earned run average and 332 strikeouts. He allowed 850 hits and 301 bases on balls in 8341/3 innings pitched. Dorish led the American League in saves in 1952 as a member of the White Sox. He stole home plate on the front end of a double steal on June 2, 1950, and is the last American League pitcher to steal home.

Dorish was a scout for the Red Sox, Houston Astros and Cleveland Indians, a minor-league manager, and the pitching coach for the Bosox (1963) and the Atlanta Braves (1968–71) after his 16-year (1941–42; 1946–59) playing career. He died in Wilkes-Barre, Pennsylvania, at the age of 79.

== See also ==
- List of Major League Baseball annual saves leaders

Sporting positions
Preceded by Sal Maglie	Boston Red Sox pitching coach 1963	Succeeded by Bob Turley
Preceded by Whit Wyatt	Atlanta Braves pitching coach 1968–1971	Succeeded by Lew Burdette
