= Stanley Jarolin =

American politician

Stanley J. Jarolin

Member of the Pennsylvania House of Representatives from the 119th district
- In office 1983–1998
- Preceded by: Fred Shupnik
- Succeeded by: John Yudichak

Personal details
- Born: January 4, 1933 Nanticoke, Pennsylvania
- Died: May 13, 2000 (aged 67) Newport Township, Pennsylvania
- Party: Democratic

Stanley J. Jarolin (January 4, 1933 – May 13, 2000) was a former Democratic member of the Pennsylvania House of Representatives.
