= Gerald Mullery =

American politician

Gerald J. Mullery
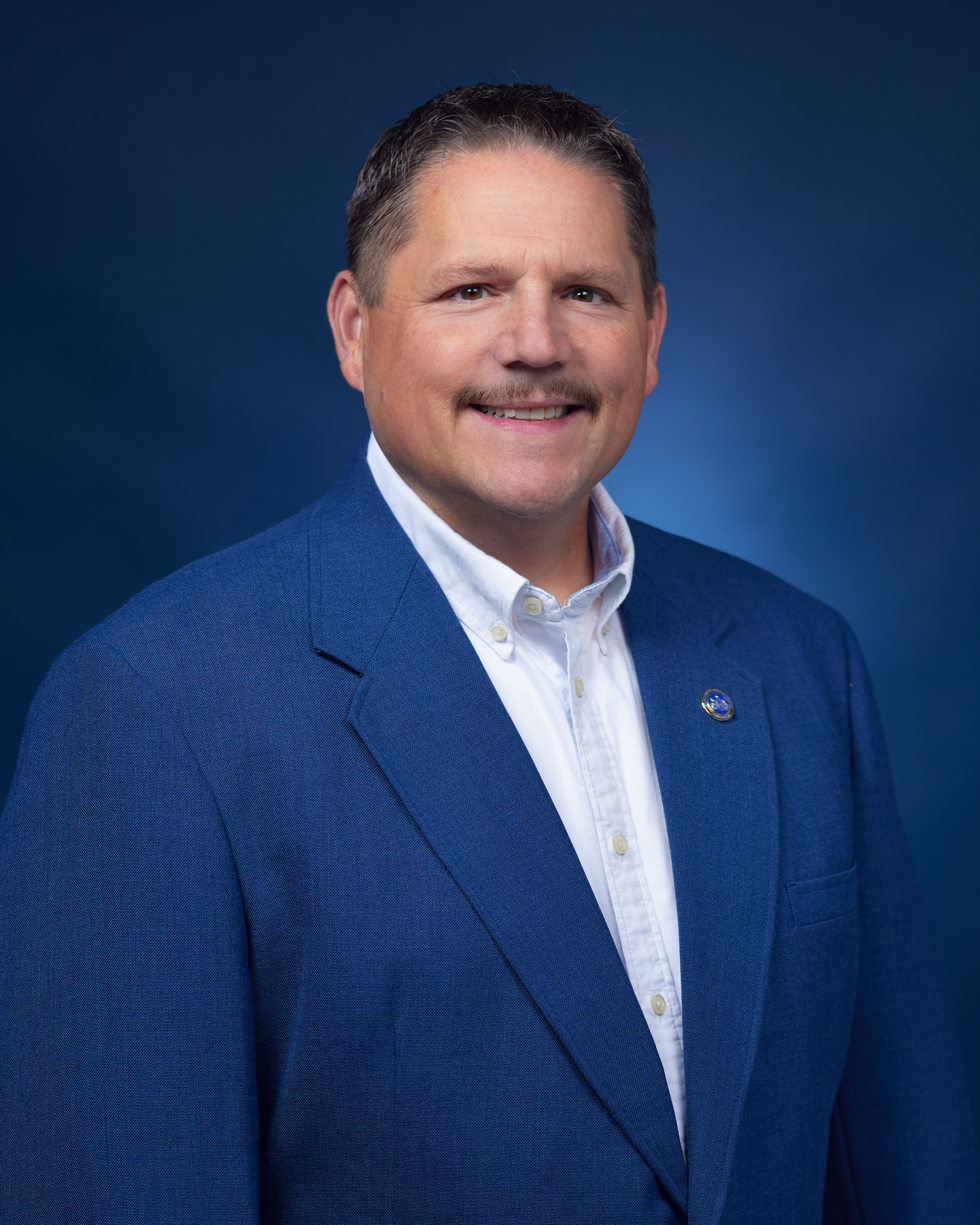

Member of the Pennsylvania House of Representatives from the 119th district
- In office January 4, 2011 – November 30, 2022
- Preceded by: John Yudichak
- Succeeded by: Alec Ryncavage

Personal details
- Party: Democratic
- Spouse: Michele Mullery
- Children: 4
- Education: King's College (B.A.); Duquesne University School of Law (J.D.)
- Occupation: Deputy Secretary

Gerald J. Mullery is an American lawyer and former politician who served as a Democratic member of the Pennsylvania House of Representatives for the 119th district from 2011 to 2022.

== Early life and education ==
Mullery was born in Wilkes-Barre, Pennsylvania and raised in Plymouth Township.

He graduated from Greater Nanticoke Area High School where he excelled on the football, wrestling, and baseball teams for the Trojans. Beyond athletics, he was engaged in a variety of extracurricular and leadership activities including French Club, serving as a class representative, contributing writer for the Trojan Tribune, and helping lead the creation of the GNA "Jungle," a student spirit organization established by his graduating class.

Mullery graduated from King's College with a degree in criminal justice and was a member of the school's inaugural football team, where he played center. He later earned his Juris Doctor from Duquesne University School of Law, completing his formal legal education before entering practice.

== Career and politics ==
Before and alongside his time in public office, Mullery built a career in workers' compensation, social security, and personal injury law spanning nearly three decades. His experience includes representing injured workers, employers, insurance companies, as well as serving as in-house counsel for a workers' compensation insurance carrier. He was recognized by Best Lawyers as a "Best Lawyer" in his field, an honor based on peer nominations, reviews, and professional evaluations within the legal community. He received this distinction multiple times, including 2021, 2022, and 2023, reflecting consistent recognition from fellow attorneys in Pennsylvania.

In the 2010 Democratic primary, Mullery secured a decisive victory. With all precincts reporting, Mullery received nearly 3,400 votes, defeating Bob Morgan and Gary Zingaretti significantly. In the general election, Mullery won a three-way race securing 8,621 votes (51.83%), defeating Republican candidate Rick Arnold (43.67%) and Libertarian Brian Bergman (4.44%).

In the 2012 general election, Mullery soundly defeated Republican Rick Arnold again. According to official results, Mullery secured 13,132 votes (60.8%) to Arnolds 8,456 (39.2%).

In the 2014 Democratic primary, Mullery won a decisive landslide victory over Hazleton Area School Board member Tony Bonomo. With all precincts reporting, Mullery received 4,312 votes compared to Bonomo's 1,131, securing renomination by a wide margin in the reconfigured district. He was unopposed in the fall primary.

In 2016, Mullery defeated Mountaintop Republican Justin Behrens 10,747 to 7,015. Following the election, Mullery described himself as "humbled" by voter support and pledged to continue focusing on key issues such as property tax reform, job creation, and public education funding. During the campaign, Mullery emphasized efforts to support economic recovery in distressed communities within the district, including areas identified as economically challenged.

In the 2018 general election, Mullery again defeated Justin Behrens. In his post-election remarks, Mullery emphasized his commitment to job creation, education funding, affordable health care, environmental protection, and property tax reform including his support for House Bill 76 which proposed eliminating school property taxes. During the campaign, Mullery pointed to economic development in the district, including the redevelopment of former industrial and mine-scarred lands and the arrival of major employers.

In his final election in 2020, Mullery defeated West Hazleton businessman John Chura, 52.6% to 47.4%.

While in office, Mullery was appointed Democratic Chair of the Pennsylvania House Labor and Industry Committee, a role that placed him in a key position to help shape legislation affecting workers across the Commonwealth. In this capacity, he emphasized his longstanding commitment to labor issues, stating that he was honored to have a greater voice for working families in Luzerne County and beyond. House Democratic Leader Joanna McClinton noted Mullery had been a consistent advocate for workers’ rights, focusing on issues such as fair wages, benefits, workplace safety, and job quality.

Additionally, Mullery was named Democratic Chairman of the Pennsylvania House Committee on Ethics. The House Committee on Ethics is responsible for reviewing potential violations of House rules, the legislative code of ethics, and the Lobby Disclosure Act, as well as overseeing ethics education for members of the House. Although it does not advance legislation, the committee plays a key oversight role in maintaining standards of conduct among elected officials.

In January 2022, Mullery announced he would not seek re-election to the Pennsylvania House of Representatives, bringing an end to more than a decade of service. Mullery served six consecutive terms and described his tenure as "one of the greatest honors" of his life. In explaining his decision, he cited his belief in the principle of a "citizen-statesperson," stating that public office should be temporary and that new voices should have the opportunity to serve. Reflecting on his public service career, he expressed gratitude to his constituents, staff, and family, noting their role in his electoral success and public service.

During his tenure, Mullery was recognized as an "Environmental Champion" multiple times in the Pennsylvania Environmental Scorecard, an evaluation conducted by a coalition of environmental advocacy organizations, including Conservation Voters of Pennsylvania, PennEnvironment, the Sierra Club, and Clean Water Action. The designation was awarded to legislators who achieved a score of 90% or higher based on votes on key environmental legislation. Mullery consistently opposed the privatization of state parks and supported measures to ensure public representation on a drilling advisory council. He emphasized the importance of protecting public lands and addressing environmental challenges affecting local communities.

State Rep. Gerald Mullery was a vocal advocate for preserving both the White Haven Center and SCI Retreat, two state facilities in Northeastern Pennsylvania that faced closure during budget-driven consolidation efforts. He argued that the White Haven Center, which served individuals with intellectual and developmental disabilities, provided essential care and local employment, and that its closure would have significant community and human impacts. Similarly, Mullery opposed the shutdown of SCI Retreat, a state correctional institution, warning that its loss would harm the regional economy and displace workers. In both cases, he framed his efforts as part of a broader commitment to protecting local jobs and maintaining critical public services in the 119th District.

After leaving elected office, Mullery was appointed Deputy Secretary of Compensation and Insurance at the Pennsylvania Department of Labor & Industry. He began this role in February 2023. In this position, Mullery oversees multiple divisions related to workers' compensation and insurance including the State Workers' Insurance Fund and the Bureau of Workers' Compensation.

== Personal life ==
Mullery married his high school sweetheart, Michele, with whom he has four children: Leah, Lauren, Liam, and Louden.
