= John Yudichak =

American politician

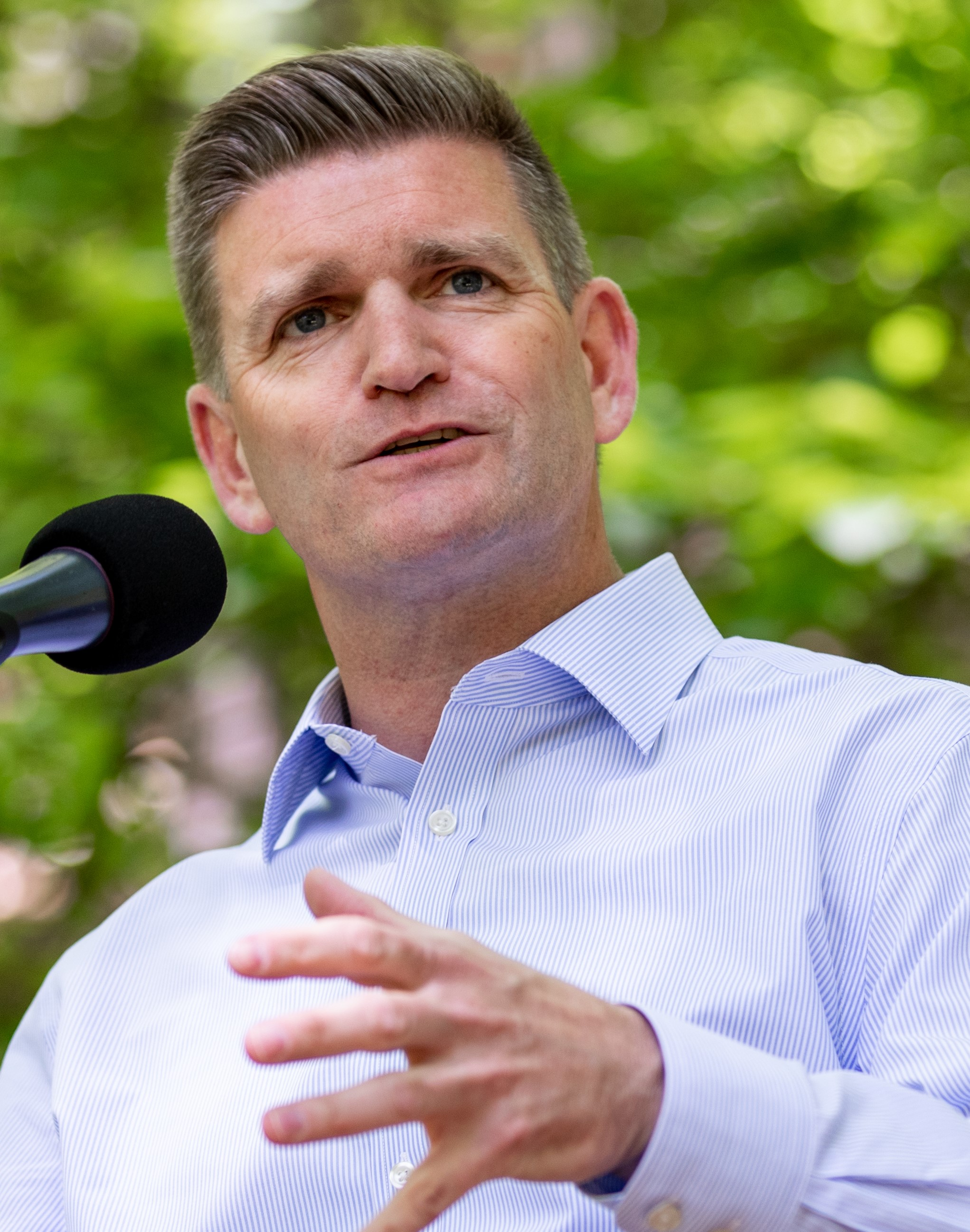

Member of the Pennsylvania Senate from the 14th district
- In office January 4, 2011 – November 30, 2022
- Preceded by: Ray Musto
- Succeeded by: Nick Miller

Member of the Pennsylvania House of Representatives from the 119th district
- In office January 5, 1999 – November 30, 2010
- Preceded by: Stanley Jarolin
- Succeeded by: Gerald Mullery

Personal details
- Born: May 1, 1970 (age 56) Wilkes-Barre, Pennsylvania, U.S.
- Party: Democratic (before 2019); Independent (2019–present)
- Other political affiliations: Republican State Senate Caucus (2019–2022)
- Children: 4
- Education: Pennsylvania State University (BA, MA)

John T. Yudichak (born May 1, 1970) is an American politician who served as a member of the Pennsylvania State Senate for 14th District from 2011 to 2022. He previously served in the Pennsylvania House of Representatives for the 119th district from 1999 to 2010. In 2024, Yudichak became the eighth president of Luzerne County Community College.

== Early life and education ==
John Yudichak was born on May 1, 1970, in Wilkes-Barre, Pennsylvania, to Joseph and Sarah Yudichak. Both Yudichak's father and grandfather were coal miners. His father was also a longtime supervisor in Plymouth Township. Yudichak graduated from Nanticoke Area High School in 1988, and also attended Wyoming Seminary for one year before matriculating to the Pennsylvania State University. He earned a Bachelor of Arts degree in English in 1993 and a Master of Arts degree in American Studies from Pennsylvania State University in 2004. He has four children.

== Career ==
Yudichak worked as an intern for U.S. Representative Paul E. Kanjorski before serving as director of development at the Osterhout Free Library in Wilkes-Barre. In 1996, he unsuccessfully challenged incumbent Stanley Jarolin for the Democratic nomination for the 119th District in the Pennsylvania House of Representatives, losing by 600 votes. However, he ran for the nomination again in 1998, and defeated Jarolin by more than 800 votes. In the general election, he defeated Republican Jean Sepling.

Yudichak was elected to the State Senate in 2010. He easily won the Democratic nomination for the 14th District seat (being vacated by Democratic incumbent Ray Musto) when he defeated Wilkes-Barre mayor Tom Leighton by a 2 to 1 margin in the May 18, 2010, primary. Yudichak won the general election on November 2, 2010, defeating Luzerne County Commissioner Stephen Urban.

On November 19, 2019, Yudichak changed his voter registration from Democrat to Independent and ceased to caucus with the Democrats, caucusing instead with the Republican majority. He blamed his party switch on "purist" partisan politicians "who demand that you choose a battle camp. You must pass their litmus test, and declare if you support ‘us,’ or ‘them.’" Yudichak would later say the friction between him and the Democratic Party was because of Progressive Democrats who opposed the expansion of Pennsylvania's energy industry and "demonize[d]" blue-collar workers.

On March 17, 2022, Yudichak announced he would not seek re-election after the redistricting process shifted his district to the Lehigh Valley and placed his home in the 20th Senate District. After leaving office, Yudichak joined GSL Public Strategies Group, a government consulting firm.

On October 17, 2023, Yudichak was chosen by the board of trustees of Luzerne County Community College to be the college's next president. He was one of three applicants interviewed for the job and was elected by a 13–2 vote of the board. He succeeded President Thomas P. Leary on July 1, 2024.
