= Jeffrey J. Selingo =

American author and journalist (born 1973)

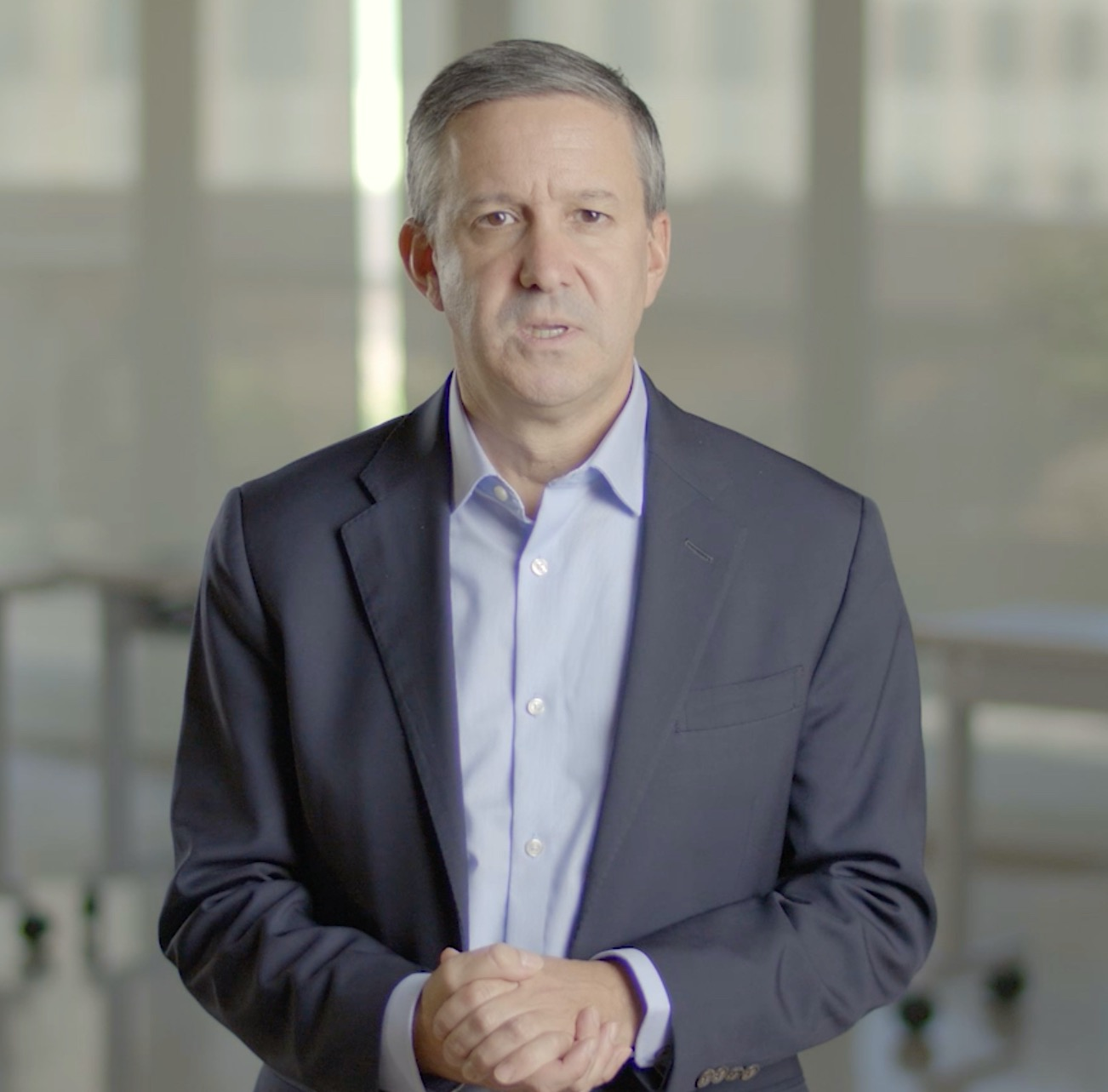
- Selingo in 2021
- Born: January 28, 1973 (age 53)
- Education: Ithaca College; Johns Hopkins University
- Occupations: Author and journalist
- Website: jeffselingo.com

Jeffrey J. Selingo also known as Jeff Selingo (born January 28, 1973) is an American author and journalist. He wrote There Is Life After College: What Parents and Students Should Know About Navigating School to Prepare for the Jobs of Tomorrow, Who Gets In and Why: A Year Inside College Admission, and College (Un)Bound: The Future of Higher Education and What It Means for Students.

From 2007 to 2011, he was the editor of The Chronicle of Higher Education.

== Early life and education ==
Selingo grew up near Wilkes-Barre, Pennsylvania. He obtained a bachelor's degree in journalism from Ithaca College, in 1995. In 2001, he received his master's degree in government from the Johns Hopkins University.

== Career ==
After graduating from college, Selingo worked as a reporter at the Ithaca Journal, The Arizona Republic, and the Wilmington (NC) Star-News. He started as a reporter at The Chronicle of Higher Education in 1997, and then worked in numerous editing roles until becoming the top editor in 2007.

== Publications ==
In Who Gets In and Why: A Year Inside College Admission, Selingo observed the selection process at three schools, Emory University, the University of Washington, and Davidson College. In the Wall Street Journal review, Naomi Schaefer Riley wrote that Selingo, “has an ear for dialogue and an eye for detail.” The reviewer said: “As compelling as ‘Who Gets In and Why’ is for disinterested observers, parents of high-school students will especially value (or desperately flip to) the sections where Mr. Selingo offers an inside view of the admissions process."
