= Swoyersville, Pennsylvania =

Borough in Pennsylvania, US

- Borough
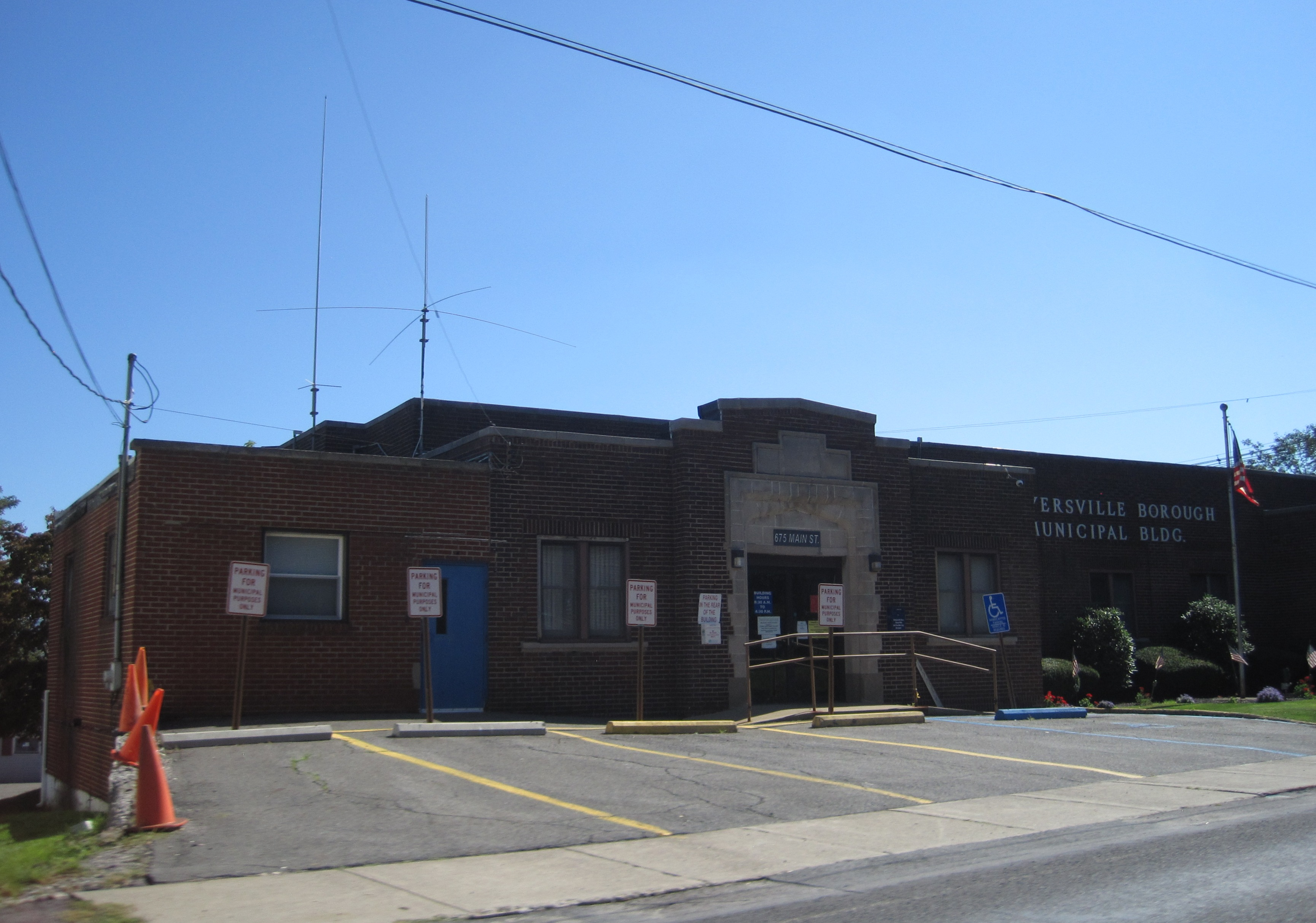
- Swoyersville Borough Municipal Building

- Location of Swoyersville in Luzerne County, Pennsylvania.

- Location within Pennsylvania Location within the United States
- Coordinates: 41°17′41″N 75°52′36″W
- Country: United States
- State: Pennsylvania
- County: Luzerne
- Incorporated: 1888

Government
  - Type: Borough Council
  - Mayor: Jeff Lewis

Area
  - Total: 2.16 sq mi (5.59 km^{2})
  - Land: 2.16 sq mi (5.59 km^{2})
  - Water: 0 sq mi (0.00 km^{2})
- Elevation: 560 ft (170 m)

Population (2020)
  - Total: 5,021 ▼
  - Estimate (2024): 5,092
  - Density: 2,318.9/sq mi (895.35/km^{2})
- Time zone: UTC−5 (Eastern (EST))
  - Summer (DST): UTC−4 (EDT)
- ZIP code: 18704
- Area code: 570
- FIPS code: 42-75832
- Website: www.swoyersvillepa.us

Swoyersville is a borough in Luzerne County, Pennsylvania, United States. The population was 5,008 in the 2020 census. Swoyersville is located within the Wyoming Valley West School District.

== History ==
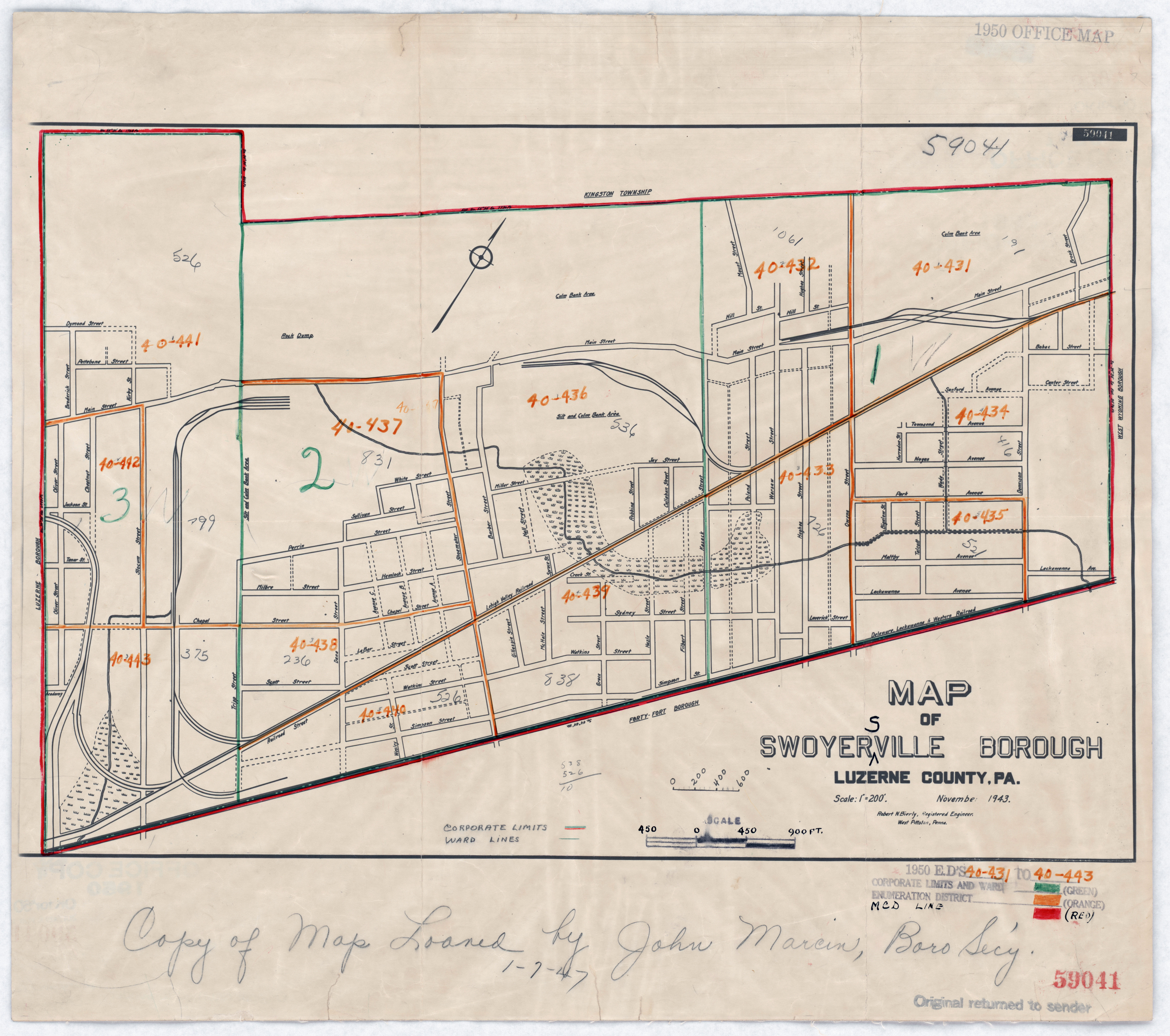
1950 map of Swoyersville

Originally a part of Kingston Township, when it was chartered by the Susquehanna Company in 1790, Swoyersville incorporated as a separate borough in 1888.

The community was originally called Swoyerville, named after mine owner John Henry Swoyer. In the 1950s, the town held a special vote on whether to add an "s" to the borough's name. The measure passed and the borough became Swoyersville.

Coal mining was the chief industry in and around Swoyersville for most of the 19th and 20th centuries. The mines ceased production in the 1950s (after the Knox Mine Disaster). However, work continued at the colliery on Main Street (in Swoyersville) well into the 1960s. In 1972, the town was severely flooded by the Susquehanna River as a result of Hurricane Agnes. At the time, there was great concern that many of the flooded abandoned mine tunnels — running underneath Swoyersville — would cave-in. However, the cave-ins never occurred.

== Geography ==
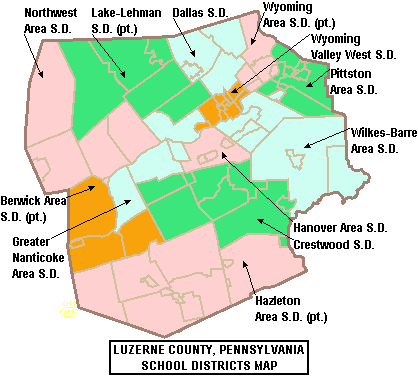
A map of Luzerne County school districts. Swoyersville is part of Wyoming Valley West School District (seen in orange).

Swoyersville is located at 41°17′41″N 75°52′36″W. According to the United States Census Bureau, the borough has a total area of 2.1 square miles (5.5 km^{2}), all land.

Swoyersville's terrain is flat in the south, with the northern part of the borough being hilly. The majority of the borough's land is urban, with some forest in the north.

A massive pile of coal ash as high as a 17-story building is in the town, surrounded by homes. The pile includes enough to fill 26,000 rail cars, and former mayor Christopher Concert advocated for it to be hauled away, if state and federal funding could be secured, despite using it for sledding in the winter as a child.

== Demographics ==
Historical population
Census	Pop.	Note	%±
1900	2,264		—
1910	5,396		138.3%
1920	6,876		27.4%
1930	9,133		32.8%
1940	9,234		1.1%
1950	7,795		−15.6%
1960	6,751		−13.4%
1970	6,786		0.5%
1980	5,795		−14.6%
1990	5,630		−2.8%
2000	5,157		−8.4%
2010	5,062		−1.8%
2020	5,021		−0.8%
2024 (est.)	5,092	▲	1.4%

According to the census, an estimated 5,092 people, including 2,444 households, reside in the borough. The population density was 2,386.4 inhabitants per square mile (921.4/km^{2}). There were 2,487 housing units at an average density of 1,090.3 per square mile (421.0/km^{2}). The racial makeup of the borough was 97.2% White, 1.8% African American, 1.1% Native American, 1.0% Asian, and 1.8% from other races. Hispanic or Latino of any race were 2.7% of the population, as of the 2020 census.

There were 2,332 households, out of which 21.0% had children under the age of 18 living with them, 40.6% were married couples living together, 30.4% had a female householder with no husband present. 37.8% had someone living alone who was 65 years of age or older.

The borough's age distribution shows 18.5% under the age of 18, 6.6% from 18 to 24, 26.7% from 25 to 44, 24.7% from 45 to 64, and 23.4% who were 65 years of age or older. The median age was 44 years. For every 100 females there were 89.4 males. For every 100 females age 18 and over, there were 86.4 males.

The median income for a household in the borough was $30,434, and the median income for a family was $39,188. Males had a median income of $29,101 versus $26,304 for females. The per capita income for the borough was $16,449. About 10.4% of families and 10.8% of the population were below the poverty line, including 19.3% of those under age 18 and 6.5% of those age 65 or over.

== Education ==
It is in the Wyoming Valley West School District.

== Notable people ==
- Adam Comorosky, Pittsburgh Pirates and Cincinnati Reds outfielder
- Harry Dorish, MLB pitcher with the Boston Red Sox, St. Louis Browns, Baltimore Orioles and Chicago White Sox
- Jim Hettes, UFC fighter
- Joe Holup, forward for the NBA's Syracuse Nationals and Detroit Pistons
- Lou Michaels, former kicker for the Baltimore Colts
- Walt Michaels, former head coach of the New York Jets
- Dick Mulligan, former Major League Baseball pitcher
- John Paluck, former DE with the Washington Redskins
- Packy Rogers, infielder with the Brooklyn Dodgers
- Steve Shemo, former Major League Baseball second baseman
- Fred Shupnik, former Democratic member of the Pennsylvania House of Representatives
- Chuck Sieminski, former American football player
