= John Gallagher Montgomery =

American politician

John Montgomery

Member of the U.S. House of Representatives from Pennsylvania's 12th district
- In office March 4, 1857 – April 24, 1857
- Preceded by: Henry M. Fuller
- Succeeded by: Paul Leidy

Personal details
- Born: John Gallagher Montgomery; June 27, 1805 Northumberland, Pennsylvania, U.S.
- Died: April 24, 1857 (aged 51) Danville, Pennsylvania, U.S.
- Party: Democratic
- Education: Washington and Jefferson College (BA)

John Gallagher Montgomery (June 27, 1805 – April 24, 1857) was a lawyer who represented Pennsylvania in the U.S. Congress briefly in 1857.

== Biography ==
Montgomery was born in Northumberland, Pennsylvania on June 27, 1805. After studying under a private tutor, he graduated from Washington College (now Washington and Jefferson College) in Washington, Pennsylvania, in 1824. He then studied law, was admitted to the bar in 1827 and commenced practice in Danville.

He was a member of the Pennsylvania House of Representatives in 1855.

Montgomery was elected as a Democrat to the Thirty-fifth Congress and served until his death. He attended the inauguration dinner for President Buchanan at the National Hotel where he was reported to have been deliberately poisoned, along with many other attendees. This incident is now known as National Hotel Disease, and is believed to have been caused by food poisoning related to poor sanitation.

== Death and interment ==
Montgomery returned home ill, and died at Danville five weeks later. He was interred at the Episcopal Cemetery in Danville. A Cenotaph was erected in his honor at the Congressional Cemetery in Washington, D.C.

== See also ==
- List of members of the United States Congress who died in office (1790–1899)
- List of members of the United States Congress killed or wounded in office

U.S. House of Representatives
Preceded by Henry M. Fuller	Member of the U.S. House of Representatives from Pennsylvania's 12th congressional district 1857	Succeeded by Paul Leidy
