= Senator Straub =

Senator Straub may refer to:

- Chester J. Straub (born 1937), New York State Senate
- Christian Markle Straub (1804–1860), Pennsylvania State Senate
- Robert W. Straub (1920–2002), Oregon State Senate
