= David Fullerton Robison =

American politician

David Robison

Member of the U.S. House of Representatives from Pennsylvania's 17th district
- In office March 4, 1855 – March 3, 1857
- Preceded by: Samuel L. Russell
- Succeeded by: Wilson Reilly

Personal details
- Born: David Fullerton Robison; May 28, 1816 Antrim Township, Pennsylvania, U.S.
- Died: June 24, 1859 (aged 43) Chambersburg, Pennsylvania, U.S.
- Party: Whig
- Relatives: David Fullerton (uncle)

David Fullerton Robison (May 28, 1816 – June 24, 1859) was a Whig member of the U.S. House of Representatives from Pennsylvania.

== Early life ==
David F. Robison (nephew of David Fullerton) was born in Antrim Township, Pennsylvania, near Greencastle, Pennsylvania. He attended the public schools, taught school, studied law, was admitted to the Franklin County, Pennsylvania, bar in 1843 and commenced practice in Chambersburg.

== United States House of Representatives ==
Robison was elected as a Whig Party candidate to the Thirty-fourth Congress. He was not a candidate for renomination and continued to practice law in Chambersburg, where he died in 1859, from a disease contracted at a banquet at the National Hotel in Washington, D.C., during the inauguration of President James Buchanan. The illness was known as National Hotel disease. He was buried in Cedar Hill Cemetery in Greencastle.

== Sources ==
- United States Congress. "David Fullerton Robison (id: R000356)". Biographical Directory of the United States Congress.
- David Fullerton Robison entry at The Political Graveyard

U.S. House of Representatives
| Preceded by Samuel L. Russell | Member of the U.S. House of Representatives from Pennsylvania's 17th congressional district 1855–1857 | Succeeded by Wilson Reilly |
