= Winthrop Welles Ketcham =

American judge (1820–1879)

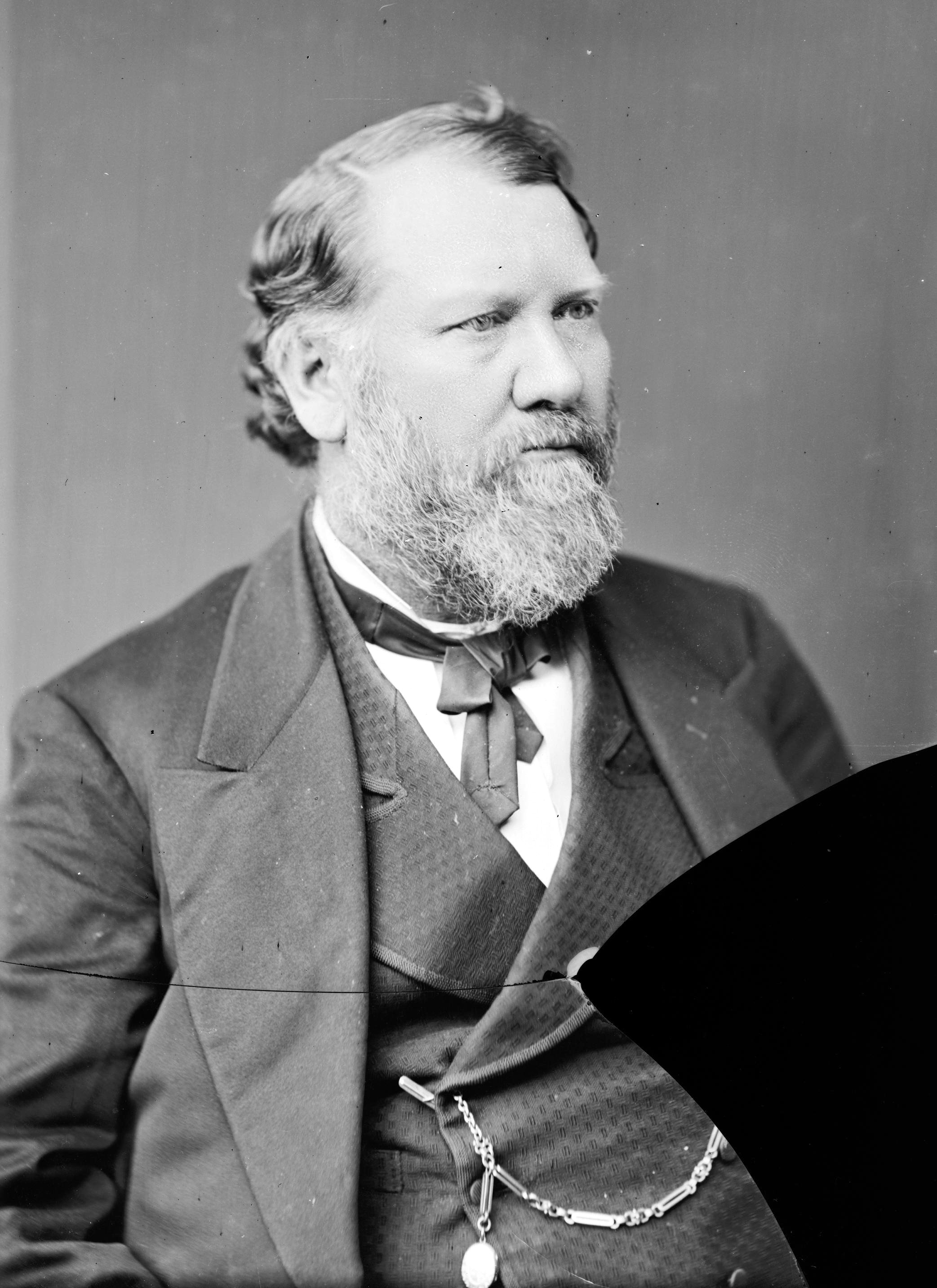

Judge of the United States District Court for the Western District of Pennsylvania
- In office June 26, 1876 – December 6, 1879
- Appointed by: Ulysses S. Grant
- Preceded by: Wilson McCandless
- Succeeded by: Marcus W. Acheson

Member of the U.S. House of Representatives from Pennsylvania's 12th district
- In office March 4, 1875 – July 19, 1876
- Preceded by: Lazarus Denison Shoemaker
- Succeeded by: William Henry Stanton

Member of the Pennsylvania Senate for the 10th district
- In office 1859–1862
- Preceded by: James H. Walton
- Succeeded by: Howkin B. Beardslee

Personal details
- Born: Winthrop Welles Ketcham; June 29, 1820 Wilkes-Barre, Pennsylvania, US
- Died: December 6, 1879 (aged 59) Pittsburgh, Pennsylvania, US
- Resting place: Hollenback Cemetery, Wilkes-Barre, Pennsylvania
- Party: Whig (until 1854); Republican (from 1854)
- Education: read law

Winthrop Welles Ketcham (sometimes spelled Ketchum, June 29, 1820 – December 6, 1879) was a United States representative from Pennsylvania and a United States district judge of the United States District Court for the Western District of Pennsylvania.

== Education and career ==
Born on June 29, 1820, in Wilkes-Barre, Pennsylvania, Ketcham pursued classical studies. He was an instructor at Wyoming Seminary in Kingston, Pennsylvania from 1844 to 1847, and at Girard College in Philadelphia, Pennsylvania in 1848 and 1849. He read law in the offices of Lazarus Denison Shoemaker and Charles Denison and was admitted to the bar January 8, 1850. He entered private practice in Wilkes-Barre from 1850 to 1855. Ketcham became a Republican when that party was first organized in 1854, having been a Whig prior to that time. He was prothonotary for Luzerne County, Pennsylvania from 1855 to 1858. He was a member of the Pennsylvania House of Representatives in 1858. He was a member of the Pennsylvania State Senate for the 10th district from 1859 to 1861. He was a delegate to the 1860 and 1864 Republican National Conventions. He resumed private practice in Wilkes-Barre from 1861 to 1863. He was an unsuccessful candidate for election in 1864 to the 39th United States Congress. He was solicitor for the Court of Claims from 1864 to 1866. He again resumed private practice in Wilkes-Barre from 1867 to 1873. In 1868, he was a presidential elector from Pennsylvania, and cast his vote for Ulysses S. Grant. In 1866, 1869, and 1872, he received votes in the Republican state conventions for the office of Governor of Pennsylvania.

== Congressional service ==
Ketcham was elected as a Republican from Pennsylvania's 12th congressional district to the United States House of Representatives of the 44th United States Congress and served from March 4, 1875, until July 19, 1876, when he resigned to accept a federal judicial appointment.

== Federal judicial service ==
Ketcham was nominated by President Ulysses S. Grant on June 7, 1876, to a seat on the United States District Court for the Western District of Pennsylvania vacated by Judge Wilson McCandless. He was confirmed by the United States Senate on June 26, 1876, and received his commission the same day. His service terminated on December 6, 1879, due to his death in Pittsburgh, Pennsylvania. He was interred in Hollenback Cemetery in Wilkes-Barre.

== Family ==
Ketcham's father, Lewis N. Ketcham, was a painter and cabinet-maker. At an early age Ketcham assisted his father in painting buildings in the city and lock-houses along the canal. In 1846, he married Sarah Urquhart, with whom he had a daughter, Ella, and a son, J. Marshall.

== Sources ==
- United States Congress. "Winthrop Welles KETCHUM (id: K000154)". Biographical Directory of the United States Congress.

Pennsylvania State Senate
Preceded by James H. Walton	Member of the Pennsylvania State Senate, 10th district 1859–1862	Succeeded by Howkin B. Beardslee
U.S. House of Representatives
Preceded by Lazarus Denison Shoemaker	Member of the U.S. House of Representatives from Pennsylvania's 12th congressional district 1875–1876	Succeeded by William Henry Stanton
Legal offices
Preceded by Wilson McCandless	Judge of the United States District Court for the Western District of Pennsylvania; 1876–1879	Succeeded by Marcus W. Acheson
