= Clarence D. Coughlin =

American politician (1883–1946)

Clarence Coughlin
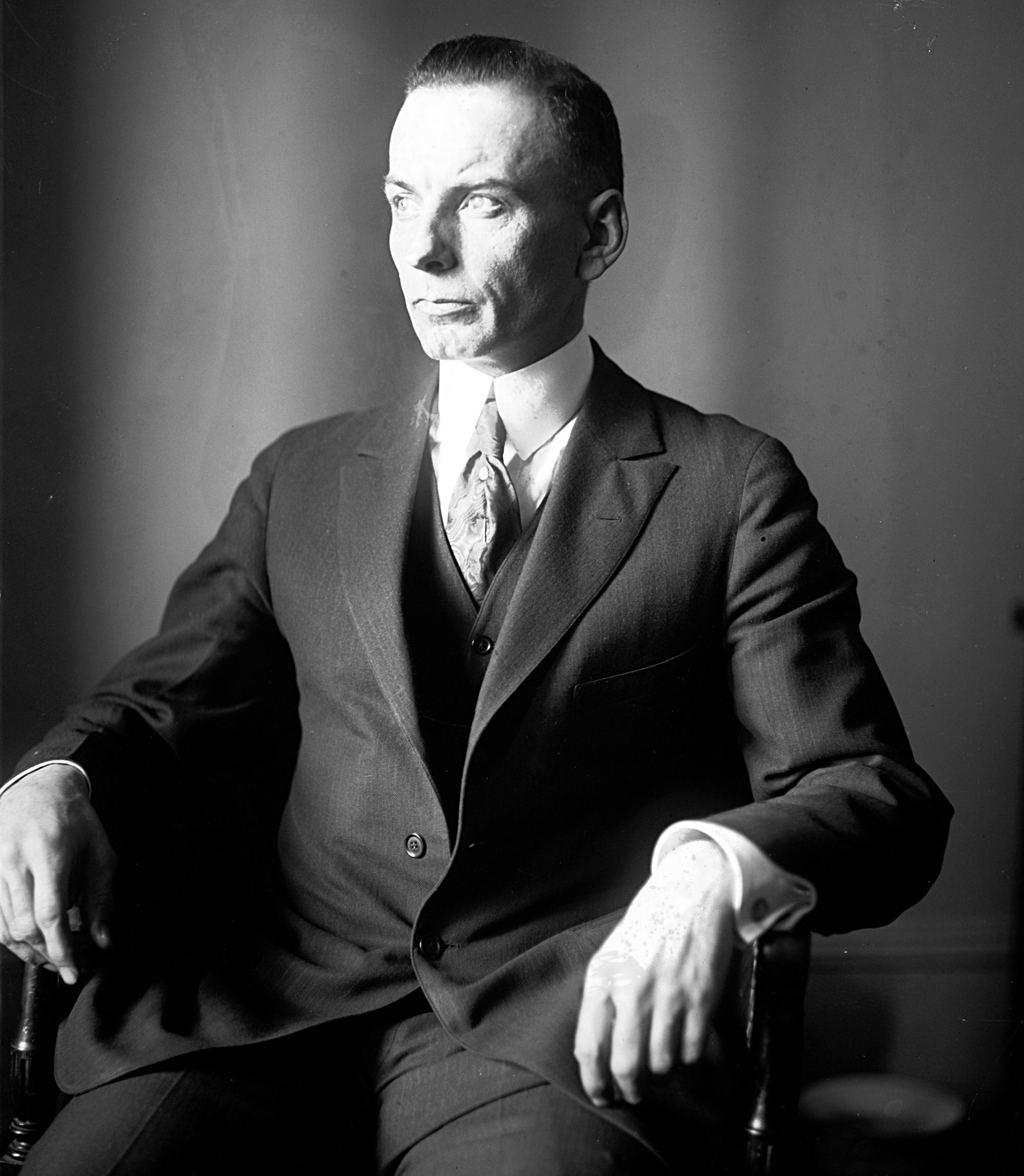

Member of the U.S. House of Representatives from Pennsylvania's 11th district
- In office March 4, 1921 – March 3, 1923
- Preceded by: John J. Casey
- Succeeded by: Laurence Hawley Watres

Personal details
- Born: July 27, 1883 Kingston, Pennsylvania
- Died: December 15, 1946 (aged 63) Wilkes-Barre, Pennsylvania
- Resting place: Mount Greenwood Cemetery in Trucksville, Pennsylvania
- Party: Republican (Prior to 1912, 1913-onward) Progressive (1912)

Clarence Dennis Coughlin (July 27, 1883 – December 15, 1946) was an American lawyer, educator, and politician who served one term as a Republican U.S. representative from Pennsylvania from 1921 to 1923.

== Biography ==
Clarence Coughlin (uncle of Lawrence Coughlin) was born in Kingston, Pennsylvania. He was the son of James M. Coughlin, who was the superintendent of Wilkes-Barre school area and would later have a school named after him following his death.

=== Education and early career ===
Clarence Coughlin attended Wesleyan University in Middletown, Connecticut, and Harvard College. He taught in the Wilkes-Barre High School from 1906 to 1910. He studied law, was admitted to the bar in 1910 and practiced law in Luzerne County, Pennsylvania, from 1910 to 1920.

He was engaged in manufacturing, banking, and the development of real estate in Wilkes-Barre and Scranton.

=== Political activities ===
He served as a member of the committee of public safety of the State and county in 1918. Coughlin also served six years as a member of the commission to revise the penal code of Pennsylvania.

He was chairman of the Republican county committee of Luzerne County from 1915 to 1917.

== Congress ==
In 1912, Coughlin unsuccessfully ran for Congress under the Progressive Party banner, coming in ahead of incumbent Republican Charles Bowman but ultimately losing to John Casey.

Coughlin was elected as a Republican to the 67th Congress, during which he served as chairman of the United States House Committee on Expenditures in the Department of Commerce. He was an unsuccessful candidate for reelection in 1922.

== Later career ==
After leaving Congress, he was appointed judge of the Luzerne County Court of Common Pleas in 1925 to fill an unexpired term caused by the death of Judge Woodward. He was elected in November 1927 for a ten-year term and served until 1937.

=== Death and burial ===
Coughlin died in Wilkes-Barre, Pennsylvania, aged 63. He is interred in Mount Greenwood Cemetery in Trucksville, Pennsylvania.

U.S. House of Representatives
Preceded by John J. Casey	Member of the U.S. House of Representatives from Pennsylvania's 11th congressional district 1921–1923	Succeeded by Laurence Hawley Watres
