= Thomas Irwin (American politician) =

American judge (1785–1870)

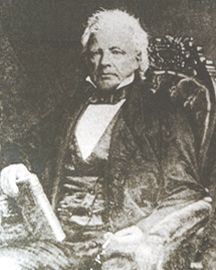

Judge of the United States District Court for the Western District of Pennsylvania
- In office April 14, 1831 – January 4, 1859
- Appointed by: Andrew Jackson
- Preceded by: William Wilkins
- Succeeded by: Wilson McCandless

Member of the U.S. House of Representatives from Pennsylvania's 14th district
- In office March 4, 1829 – March 3, 1831
- Preceded by: Andrew Stewart
- Succeeded by: Andrew Stewart

Personal details
- Born: Thomas Irwin; February 22, 1785 Philadelphia, Pennsylvania, United States
- Died: May 14, 1870 (aged 85) Pittsburgh, Pennsylvania
- Resting place: Allegheny Cemetery; Pittsburgh, Pennsylvania
- Party: Jacksonian Democrat
- Education: Franklin & Marshall College read law

Thomas Irwin (February 22, 1785 – May 14, 1870) was a United States representative from Pennsylvania and a United States district judge of the United States District Court for the Western District of Pennsylvania.

== Education and career ==
Born on February 22, 1785, in Philadelphia, Pennsylvania, Irwin attended the common schools, Franklin College (now Franklin & Marshall College) in Lancaster, Pennsylvania and read law in 1808. He was editor of the Philadelphia Repository starting in 1804. He was admitted to the bar and entered private practice in Uniontown, Pennsylvania in 1808, and from 1811 to 1812. He was an Indian agent in Natchitoches, Louisiana from 1808 to 1810, also practicing law at that location. He was deputy attorney general for Fayette County, Pennsylvania from 1812 to 1819. He was a member of the Pennsylvania House of Representatives from Fayette County from 1824 to 1828.

== Congressional service ==
Irwin was elected as a Jacksonian Democrat from Pennsylvania's 14th congressional district to the United States House of Representatives of the 21st United States Congress, serving from March 4, 1829, to March 3, 1831. He was not a candidate for renomination in 1830.

== Federal judicial service ==
Irwin received a recess appointment from President Andrew Jackson on April 14, 1831, to a seat on the United States District Court for the Western District of Pennsylvania vacated by Judge William Wilkins. He was nominated to the same position by President Jackson on December 7, 1831. He was confirmed by the United States Senate on March 21, 1832, and received his commission the same day. His service terminated on January 4, 1859, due to his resignation.

=== Circumstances of his resignation ===
On January 13, 1859, the United States House of Representatives authorized the United States House Committee on the Judiciary to investigate charges against Irwin. On January 28, 1859, the House discontinued proceedings on the report that Irwin had resigned. At least 3 different attempts were made by Pittsburgh Bar to secure Irwin's impeachment. Irwin had been charged with partiality toward certain lawyers, with holding needless terms of court and with demanding that the United States Marshal for the Western District of Pennsylvania kick-back a portion of his salary and fees to the Judge. Irwin was also detested by the anti-slavery bar of Western Pennsylvania for the maintenance of the constitutionality of the Fugitive Slave Act of 1850. In the face of almost certain impeachment, Irwin resigned.

== Later career and death ==
Following his resignation from the federal bench, Irwin resumed private practice in Pittsburgh, Pennsylvania from 1859 to 1870. He died on May 14, 1870, in Pittsburgh. He was interred in Allegheny Cemetery in Pittsburgh.

== Sources ==
- United States Congress. "Thomas Irwin (id: I000043)". Biographical Directory of the United States Congress.

U.S. House of Representatives
Preceded by Andrew Stewart	Member of the U.S. House of Representatives from Pennsylvania's 14th congressional district 1829–1831	Succeeded by Andrew Stewart
Legal offices
Preceded by William Wilkins	Judge of the United States District Court for the Western District of Pennsylvania; 1831–1859	Succeeded by Wilson McCandless
