= Thomas W. Templeton =

American politician (1867–1935)

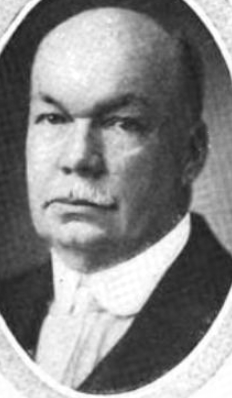

Member of the U.S. House of Representatives from Pennsylvania's 11th district
- In office March 4, 1917 – March 3, 1919
- Preceded by: John J. Casey
- Succeeded by: John J. Casey

Personal details
- Born: Thomas Weir Templeton; November 8, 1867 Plymouth, Pennsylvania
- Died: September 5, 1935 (aged 67) Plymouth, Pennsylvania
- Party: Republican
- Education: Wyoming Seminary
- Occupation: Politician

Thomas Weir Templeton (November 8, 1867 – September 5, 1935) was a Republican member of the U.S. House of Representatives from Pennsylvania.

== Biography ==
Thomas Weir Templeton was born in Plymouth, Pennsylvania, a son of Hugh Templeton and his wife, Christiana Weir. He graduated from Wyoming Seminary in Kingston, Pennsylvania. He studied law, was admitted to the bar in 1899 but did not practice. He served as prothonotary of Luzerne County, Pennsylvania, from 1904 to 1907. He engaged in business as a florist at Kingston.

Templeton was elected as a Republican to the Sixty-fifth Congress. He was not a candidate for renomination in 1918. He became superintendent of grounds and buildings at the Pennsylvania State Capitol in 1920 through 1923. He resumed the florist business in Kingston and died in Plymouth. He was interred in Edgehill Cemetery in West Nanticoke, Pennsylvania.

== Sources ==
- United States Congress. "Thomas W. Templeton (id: T000121)". Biographical Directory of the United States Congress.
- The Political Graveyard

U.S. House of Representatives
Preceded by John J. Casey	Member of the U.S. House of Representatives from Pennsylvania's 11th congressional district 1917–1919	Succeeded by John J. Casey
