= Wilson McCandless =

American judge (1810–1882)

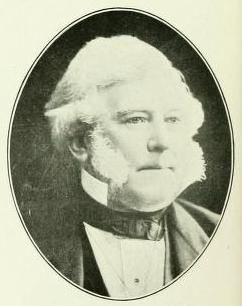

Judge of the United States District Court for the Western District of Pennsylvania
- In office February 8, 1859 – July 24, 1876
- Appointed by: James Buchanan
- Preceded by: Thomas Irwin
- Succeeded by: Winthrop Welles Ketcham

Personal details
- Born: Wilson McCandless; June 19, 1810 Pittsburgh, Pennsylvania
- Died: June 30, 1882 (aged 72) Pittsburgh, Pennsylvania
- Education: University of Pittsburgh (B.A.)

Wilson McCandless (June 19, 1810 – June 30, 1882) was a United States district judge of the United States District Court for the Western District of Pennsylvania.

== Education and career ==
Born in Pittsburgh, Pennsylvania, McCandless received a Bachelor of Arts degree from the Western University of Pennsylvania (now known as the University of Pittsburgh) in 1826 and read law to enter the bar in 1831. He was in private practice in Pittsburgh from 1831 to 1859, also serving in the Pennsylvania State Senate.

== Federal judicial service ==
On February 3, 1859, McCandless was nominated by President James Buchanan to a seat on the United States District Court for the Western District of Pennsylvania vacated by Judge Thomas Irwin. McCandless was confirmed by the United States Senate on February 8, 1859, and received his commission the same day. McCandless served in that capacity until his retirement on July 24, 1876.

== Later career and death ==
McCandless then returned to private practice in Pittsburgh from 1876 until his death there on June 30, 1882.

== Namesake city ==
McCandless is the namesake of McCandless, Pennsylvania.

== Sources ==
Legal offices
Preceded by Thomas Irwin	Judge of the United States District Court for the Western District of Pennsylvania; 1859–1876	Succeeded by Winthrop Welles Ketcham
