= Hendrick B. Wright =

American politician (1808–1881)

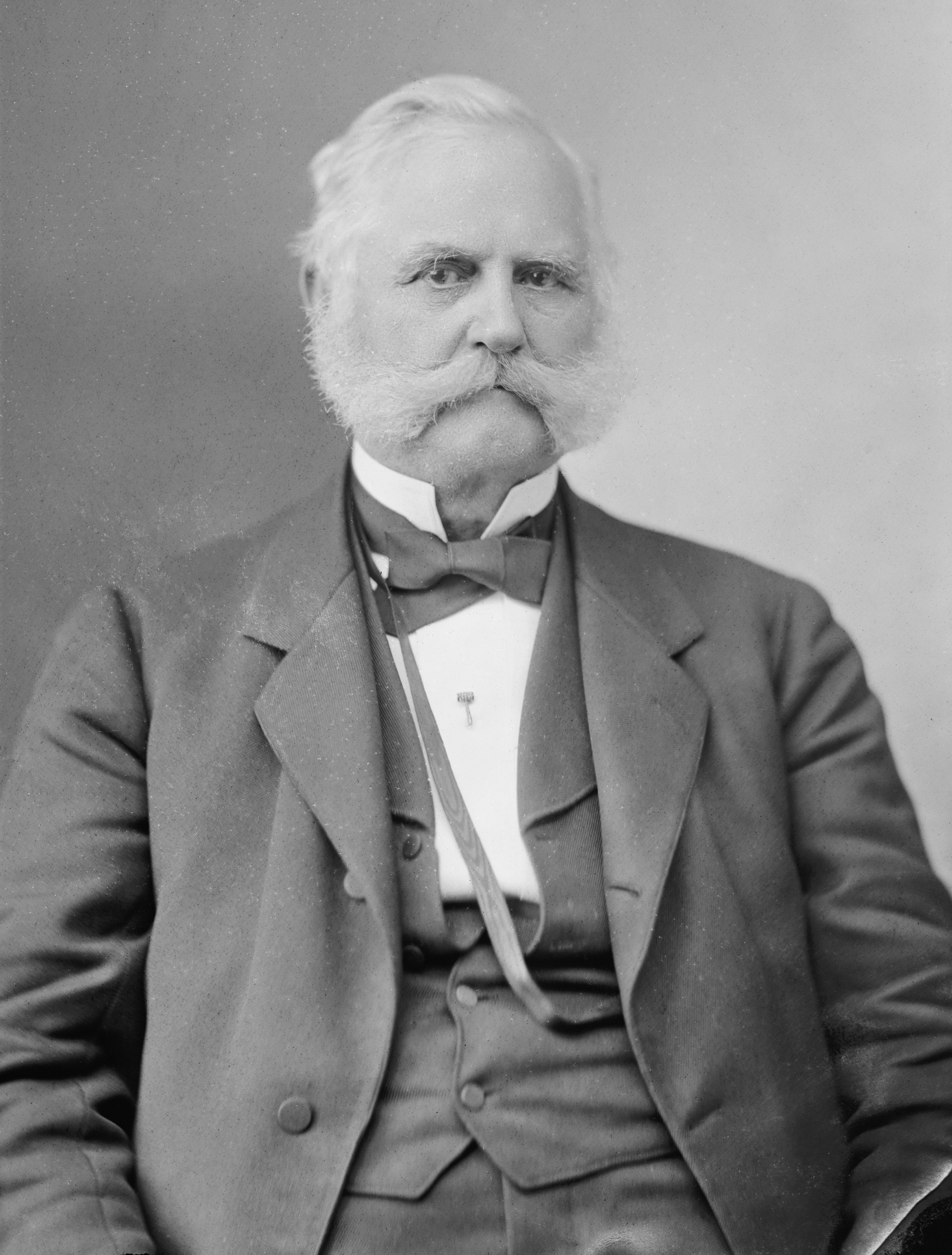

Member of the U.S. House of Representatives from Pennsylvania's 12th district
- In office March 4, 1877 – March 3, 1881
- Preceded by: William Henry Stanton
- Succeeded by: Joseph A. Scranton
- In office July 4, 1861 – March 3, 1863
- Preceded by: George W. Scranton
- Succeeded by: Charles Denison
- In office March 4, 1853 – March 3, 1855
- Preceded by: Galusha A. Grow
- Succeeded by: Henry Mills Fuller

Member of the Pennsylvania House of Representatives
- In office 1841–1843

Personal details
- Born: Hendrick Bradley Wright; April 24, 1808 Plymouth, Pennsylvania
- Died: September 2, 1881 (aged 73) Wilkes-Barre, Pennsylvania
- Party: Democratic Party; Greenback Party
- Profession: Lawyer

Hendrick Bradley Wright (April 24, 1808 – September 2, 1881) was a Democratic and Greenback member of the U.S. House of Representatives from Pennsylvania.

== Early life ==
Hendrick B. Wright was born in Plymouth, Pennsylvania on April 24, 1808, the son of Joseph Wright, a farmer and coal mine operator. He attended the Wilkes-Barre Grammar School and Dickinson College in Carlisle, Pennsylvania. In 1831, he left Dickinson to study law, gained admission to the Luzerne County bar, and commenced practice in Wilkes-Barre, Pennsylvania.

== Political activities ==
He was appointed district attorney for Luzerne County, Pennsylvania, in 1834. He was a member of the Pennsylvania House of Representatives from 1841 to 1843 and served the last year as Speaker. He was a delegate to the Democratic National Conventions in 1844, 1848, 1852, 1856, 1860, 1868, and 1876.

=== United States House of Representatives ===
In 1850, Wright was an unsuccessful candidate for election to the U.S. House of Representatives. In 1852, was elected as a Democrat to the Thirty-third Congress, but he was an unsuccessful candidate for reelection in 1854. He was again elected to the Thirty-seventh Congress to fill the vacancy caused by the death of George W. Scranton. He was elected as a Democrat to the Forty-fifth Congress and reelected as a Greenbacker to the Forty-sixth Congress. He was chairman of the United States House Committee on Manufactures during the Forty-fifth Congress.

During the Great Railroad Strike of 1877, Congressman Wright protested the use of state and federal troops to put down the strike in his District: "Troops were introduced into my district at the solicitation of the men who controlled the mines and the manufacturing establishments … There was no necessity or occasion for it … It only stirred up [the labor] element. And now, since that has been done, that element has shown its power and its strength, a power and strength that cannot be resisted, that will work its way out … You cannot suppress a volcano." (Bruce, 1959, pp. 309–10)

He was an unsuccessful candidate for reelection in 1880 and was unsuccessful in getting the Greenback nomination for President the same year, losing to James Weaver. He died in Wilkes-Barre in 1881. He is interred in Hollenback Cemetery.

== Bibliography ==
Bruce, Robert. 1877: Year of Violence. Ivan R. Dee: Chicago. 1959 (1987).

Curran, Daniel J. "Hendrick B. Wright: A Study in Leadership." Ph.D. diss., Fordham University, 1962.

== See also ==
- Plymouth, Pennsylvania

== Sources ==
- United States Congress. "Hendrick B. Wright (id: W000761)". Biographical Directory of the United States Congress.
- The Political Graveyard

U.S. House of Representatives
Preceded by Galusha A. Grow	Member of the U.S. House of Representatives from Pennsylvania's 12th congressional district 1853–1855	Succeeded by Henry M. Fuller
Preceded by George W. Scranton	Member of the U.S. House of Representatives from Pennsylvania's 12th congressional district 1861–1863	Succeeded by Charles Denison
Preceded by William H. Stanton	Member of the U.S. House of Representatives from Pennsylvania's 12th congressional district 1877–1881	Succeeded by Joseph A. Scranton
