= John J. Casey =

American politician (1875–1929)

John Joseph Casey
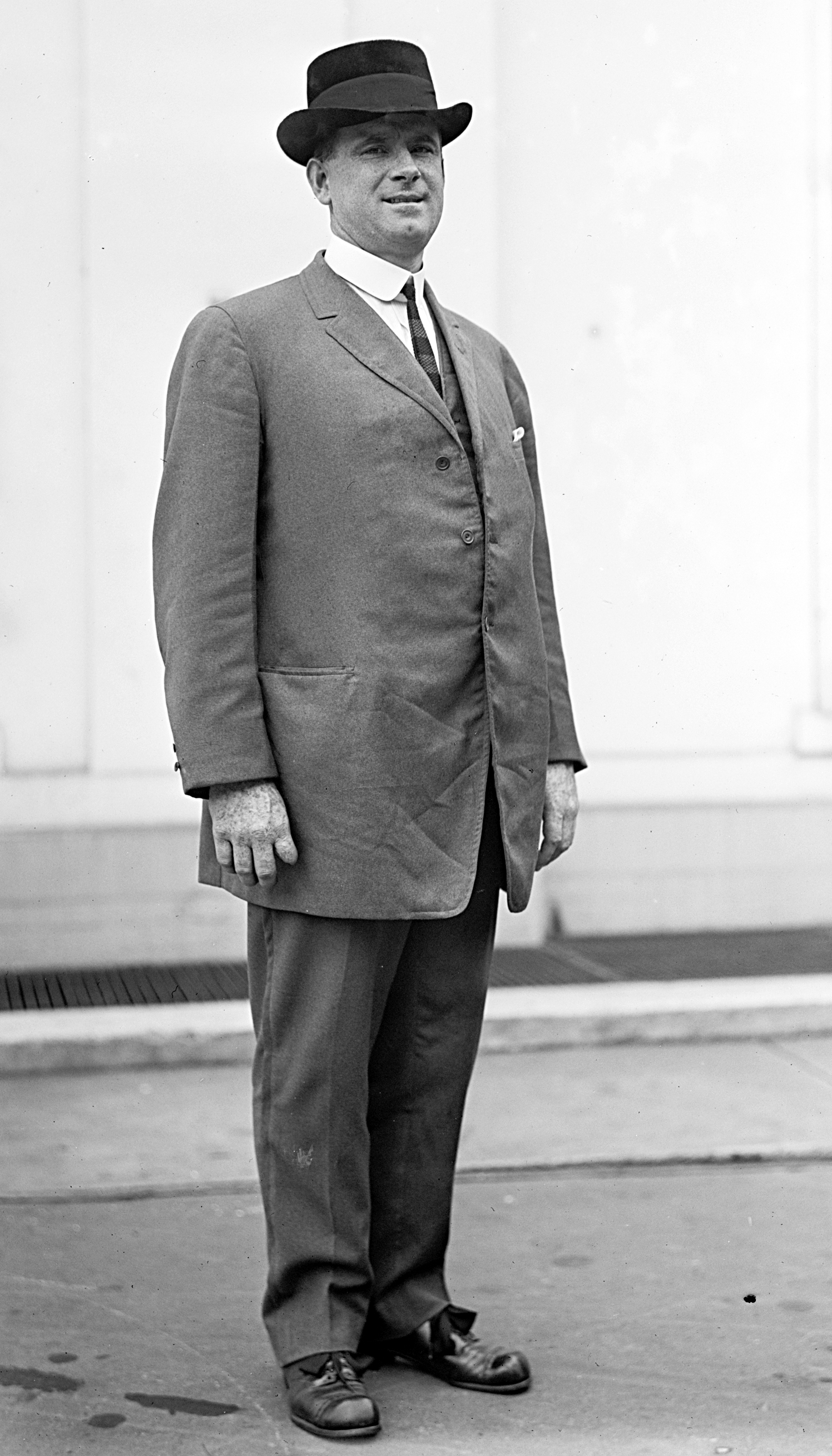

Member of the U.S. House of Representatives from Pennsylvania
- In office March 4, 1927 – May 5, 1929
- Preceded by: Edmund Nelson Carpenter
- Succeeded by: Charles Murray Turpin
- Constituency: 12th district
- In office March 4, 1923 – March 3, 1925
- Preceded by: John Reber
- Succeeded by: Edmund Nelson Carpenter
- Constituency: 12th district
- In office March 4, 1919 – March 3, 1921
- Preceded by: Thomas W. Templeton
- Succeeded by: Clarence Dennis Coughlin
- Constituency: 11th district
- In office March 4, 1913 – March 3, 1917
- Preceded by: Charles Calvin Bowman
- Succeeded by: Thomas W. Templeton
- Constituency: 11th district

Member of the Pennsylvania House of Representatives
- In office 1907–1909

Personal details
- Born: May 26, 1875 Wilkes-Barre, Pennsylvania
- Died: May 5, 1929 (aged 53) Balboa, Panama Canal Zone
- Party: Democratic

John Joseph Casey (May 26, 1875 – May 5, 1929) was a Democratic member of the U.S. House of Representatives from Pennsylvania.

Casey was born in Wilkes-Barre Township, Pennsylvania. He was an early union organizer and a member of the Pennsylvania State House of Representatives from 1907 to 1909.

== Early life ==
Casey was born in the Georgetown section of Wilkes Barre, Pennsylvania in 1875 – the oldest son of an Irish immigrant family. When John was 7, his father, Andrew Casey, died in a mining accident in the Wilkes-Barre Coal Mines. In accordance with company policy, the oldest son of a miner was required to take his father's place in the mine if his family was to retain their home and company credit. The mining companies owned the miners' homes and paid the miners with company credit rather than money.

In 1883 at the age of eight, Casey was a breaker boy in Plymouth, Pennsylvania, responsible for breaking the slag off of coal fragments as they were excavated from the mine. By the age of 12 he was a 'mule skinner', charged with dragging the mules in and out of the mines. According to his grandson, Terry W. Casey: "he used to speak about his excitement towards days with the occasional noontime break, which could last almost an hour in length. That was until he realized why they had the breaks - which were used as time to remove bodies of dead miners from the work zone, as had been done to his father." His harrowing experience in the coal mines of the 1880s and 90s would have a profound impact on his career both as a union organizer and a Congressman.

== Union organizer and U.S. congressman ==
In 1900 the United Mine Workers President John Mitchell visited the Pennsylvania anthracite region and Casey quickly made a name for himself as a union organizer. His work with big labor allowed him to enter into the political arena. Running on the Labor Party ticket, in 1906 Casey was elected to the Pennsylvania State Legislature. In the 1912 general election, Casey scored the first of what would be six congressional victories over the next twenty years.

Casey was elected as a Democrat to the Sixty-third and Sixty-fourth Congresses, but was an unsuccessful candidate for reelection in 1916. He was appointed a member of the advisory council to the United States Secretary of Labor in 1918, and appointed labor advisor and executive of the labor adjustment division for the Emergency Fleet Corporation, United States Shipping Board, during the First World War.

The early 1920s was a lonely place to be for a pro labor candidate in what was then a Republican-dominated region. He was again elected to the Sixty-sixth Congress, but was an unsuccessful candidate for reelection in 1920. Again elected to the Sixty-eighth Congress, but an unsuccessful candidate for reelection in 1924. After this defeat he worked as a business agent for the Plumbers and Steam Fitters' Union. He was finally elected to the Seventieth and Seventy-first Congresses and served until his death at Balboa, Panama Canal Zone.

== Death and legacy ==
During his political career Casey espoused the views of organized labor and was aggressive in educating both his colleagues and the general public about the issues pertaining to safe working conditions for miners and collective bargaining for unions. Additionally he staunchly opposed several acts of anti-immigration legislation specifically targeting immigrants from eastern and southern Europe. In short, Casey's career was characterized in championing the poorer classes of society. This populist stance resulted, in some instances, with endorsements from one or both of the major parties, even while running on the labor ticket.

Throughout his later life Casey struggled with high blood pressure in a time when there were no medications to control this. A health-related Caribbean vacation ended on May 5, 1929, when the 53-year-old Congressman suffered a stroke and died. His funeral took place nine days later in his home town of Wilkes Barre, Pennsylvania, where approximately 20,000 people lined the streets to show their affection for the late congressman. Casey is interred in St. Mary's Cemetery in Hanover Township, Luzerne County, Pennsylvania. On his tombstone there are two titles engraved. One is 'United States Congressman', and above that title is emblazoned 'Labor Man', a symbolic gesture of his dedication to ideals over his personal position.

== Personal life ==
Casey was survived by his wife and nine of his eleven children. He ensured that none of these children ever worked in a mine, with several of his sons attending both West Point and Annapolis. Accounts of Casey characterize him by his gregarious personality, his bright red hair and tremendous physical stature.

It was reported that his congressional staff would always keep an extra desktop on hand. The congressman – an Irish miner at 6 feet 5 inches (1.96 m) and 250 pounds (110 kg) – was reputed to regularly split desktops in half with a strong blow.

During his tenure as a union organizer, Casey on many occasions, was pursued by private detective organizations, including the Pinkerton National Detective Agency, and private company-owned police forces in an attempt to deter him from unionizing several industries. In the 1890s, labor organizing was a criminal offense punishable by imprisonment, provided the organizers weren't killed during apprehension.

As a young boy, Casey left for work at 6 am. He would enter the Wilkes Barre mine shaft, walk beneath the Susquehanna River, and surface in the Plymouth shaft to report in as a breaker boy.

== See also ==
- List of members of the United States Congress who died in office (1900–1949)

== Sources ==
- United States Congress. "John J. Casey (id: C000223)". Biographical Directory of the United States Congress.
- The Political Graveyard
- The Wilkes Barre Times Leader
- The Times Leader Archives

U.S. House of Representatives
Preceded by Charles Calvin Bowman	Member of the U.S. House of Representatives from Pennsylvania's 11th congressional district 1913–1917	Succeeded by Thomas W. Templeton
Preceded by Thomas W. Templeton	Member of the U.S. House of Representatives from Pennsylvania's 11th congressional district 1919–1921	Succeeded by Clarence Dennis Coughlin
Preceded by John Reber	Member of the U.S. House of Representatives from Pennsylvania's 12th congressional district 1923–1925	Succeeded by Edmund Nelson Carpenter
Preceded by Edmund Nelson Carpenter	Member of the U.S. House of Representatives from Pennsylvania's 12th congressional district 1927–1929	Succeeded by Charles Murray Turpin
