= George Washington Woodward =

American judge (1809–1875)

George Woodward
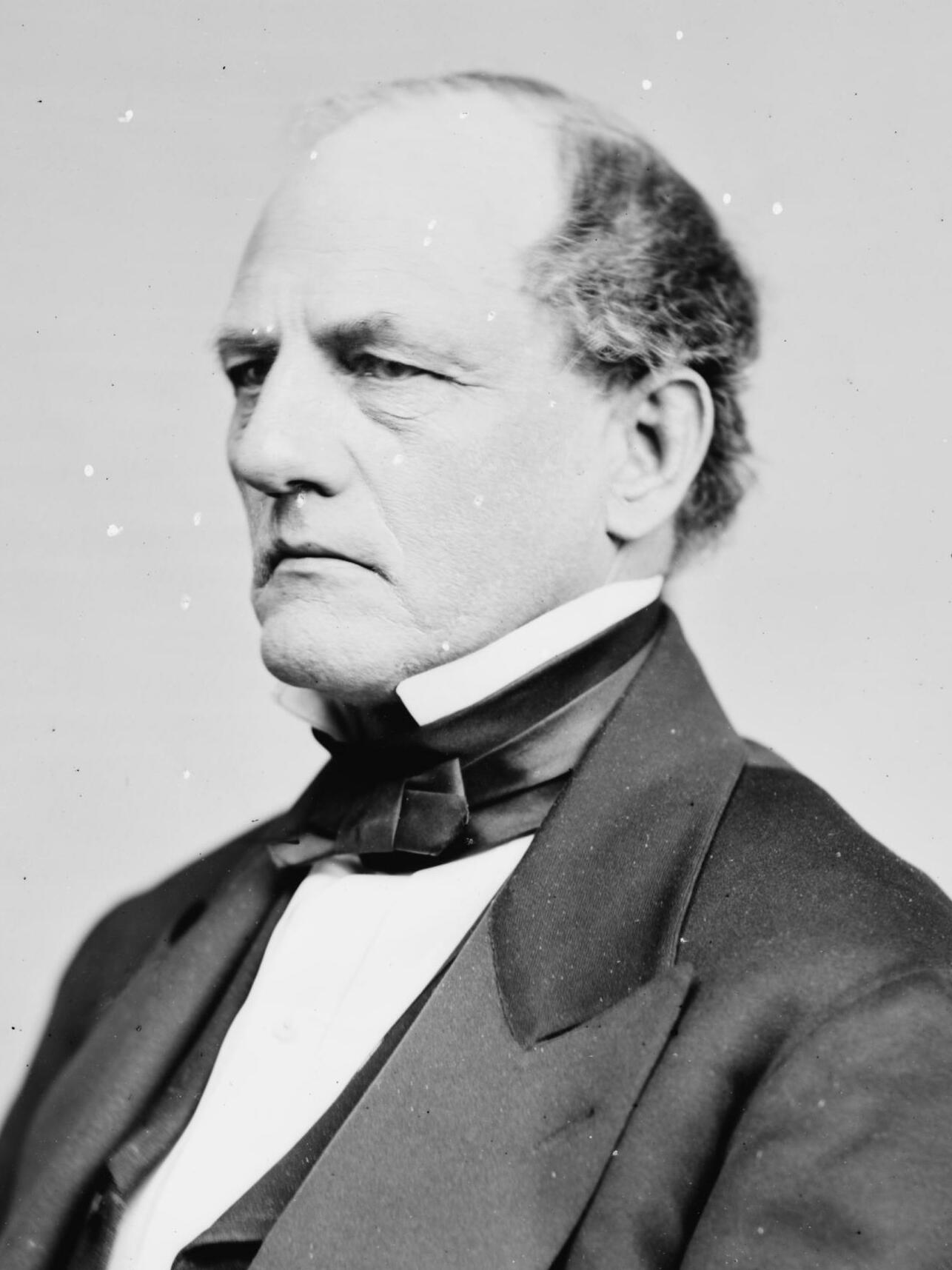

Member of the U.S. House of Representatives from Pennsylvania's 12th district
- In office November 21, 1867 – March 3, 1871
- Preceded by: Charles Denison
- Succeeded by: Lazarus Denison Shoemaker

Chief Justice of the Supreme Court of Pennsylvania
- In office 1863–1867

Justice of the Supreme Court of Pennsylvania
- In office 1852–1867

Personal details
- Born: George Washington Woodward; March 26, 1809 Bethany, Pennsylvania, U.S.
- Died: May 10, 1875 (aged 66) Rome, Kingdom of Italy
- Party: Democratic
- Children: George
- Education: Hobart College

George Washington Woodward (March 26, 1809 – May 10, 1875) was a justice and chief justice of the Supreme Court of Pennsylvania, and a Democratic member of the U.S. House of Representatives from Pennsylvania.

George W. Woodward was born in Bethany, Pennsylvania. He attended Geneva College (now Hobart and William Smith Colleges) in Geneva, New York, and Wilkes-Barre Academy in Wilkes-Barre, Pennsylvania. He studied law, was admitted to the bar in 1830 and commenced practice in Wilkes-Barre. He was a delegate to the State constitutional convention in 1837. He served as president judge of the fourth judicial district from 1841 to 1851.

He was an unsuccessful candidate for United States Senator in 1844.

Woodward was nominated in 1845 by President James K. Polk as an associate justice of the Supreme Court of the United States but the United States Senate voted 20–29 not to confirm him. A major motivation for the failure of his nomination was nativist views that Woodward supported.

Woodward was an associate judge of the Supreme Court of Pennsylvania from 1852 to 1863 and chief justice from 1863 to 1867. He was an unsuccessful Democratic candidate for governor in 1863.

Woodward was elected as a Democrat to the Fortieth Congress to fill the vacancy caused by the death of Charles Denison. He was reelected to the Forty-first Congress. He was not a candidate for renomination in 1870. He was a delegate to the 1868 Democratic National Convention. He was an unsuccessful candidate for president judge of the eleventh judicial district in 1870. He moved to Philadelphia prior to 1860 and continued the practice of law. He was a delegate to the State constitutional convention in 1873. He traveled abroad in 1874 and died in Rome in the Kingdom of Italy in 1875. Interment in Hollenback Cemetery in Wilkes-Barre, Pennsylvania.

His son, George A. Woodward, would become a brigadier general in the United States Army.

== Sources ==
- United States Congress. "George Washington Woodward (id: W000730)". Biographical Directory of the United States Congress.

Legal offices
Preceded by Walter Lowrie	Chief Justice of the Pennsylvania Supreme Court; 1863–1867	Succeeded by James Thompson
Party political offices
Preceded by Henry Foster	Democratic nominee for Governor of Pennsylvania; 1863	Succeeded by Hiester Clymer
U.S. House of Representatives
Preceded by Charles Denison	Member of the U.S. House of Representatives from Pennsylvania's 12th congressional district 1867–1871	Succeeded by Lazarus Shoemaker
