= Lazarus D. Shoemaker =

American politician

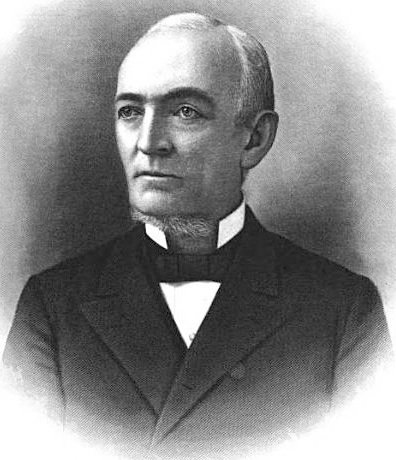
Lazarus D. Shoemaker (Pennsylvania Congressman)

Lazarus Denison Shoemaker (November 5, 1819 – September 11, 1893), also known as L.D. Shoemaker, was an American politician from Pennsylvania who served as a Republican member of the U.S. House of Representatives for Pennsylvania's 12th congressional district from 1871 to 1875.

== Biography ==
Lazarus D. Shoemaker was born in Kingston, Pennsylvania on November 5, 1819 to Elijah and Elisabeth S. (Denison) Shoemaker. He attended Nazareth Hall in Nazareth, Pennsylvania, and Kenyon College in Gambier, Ohio. He graduated from Yale College in 1840. He studied law, was admitted to the bar in 1842 and commenced practice in Wilkes-Barre, Pennsylvania. He was a member of the Pennsylvania State Senate for the 12th district from 1867 to 1870.

Shoemaker was elected as a Republican to the Forty-second and Forty-third Congresses. He served as chairman of the United States House Committee on Revolutionary Pensions during the Forty-third Congress. He was not a candidate for renomination in 1874.

He resumed the practice of his profession and also engaged in banking.

== Death and interment ==
Shoemaker died in Wilkes-Barre on September 11, 1893, and was interred in the Forty Fort Cemetery in Forty Fort, Pennsylvania.

== Notes ==
Pennsylvania State Senate
Preceded by Jasper Billings Stark	Member of the Pennsylvania Senate, 12th district 1867-1870	Succeeded by Samuel G. Turner
U.S. House of Representatives
Preceded by George W. Woodward	Member of the U.S. House of Representatives from Pennsylvania's 12th congressional district 1871–1875	Succeeded by Winthrop W. Ketcham
