= Samuel L. Russell =

American politician

Samuel Lyon Russell (July 30, 1816 – September 27, 1891) was a Whig member of the United States of America (U.S.) House of Representatives from Pennsylvania.

== Formative years ==
Born in Bedford, Pennsylvania, on July 30, 1816, Samuel L. Russell was the son of James McPherson Russell). He attended the common schools and Bedford Academy before graduating from Washington College in Washington, Pennsylvania, in 1834.

He then studied law, was admitted to the bar in 1837, and opened his legal practice in Bedford.

== Legal and political career ==
An attorney with private practice experience, Russell subsequently served as prosecuting attorney for Bedford County, Pennsylvania, during the 1840s.

He was then elected as a Whig to the 33rd United States Congress, but was not a candidate for renomination.

After resuming the practice of law in Bedford, he became a Republican upon the organization of that party in 1856. A member of the state constitutional convention in 1873, he was also a member of the town council and the school board.

== Death and interment ==
Russell died in Bedford on September 27, 1891, and was interred in Bedford Cemetery.

== Sources ==
- United States Congress. "Samuel L. Russell (id: R000539)". Biographical Directory of the United States Congress.
- The Political Graveyard

U.S. House of Representatives
Preceded by Andrew Parker	Member of the U.S. House of Representatives from Pennsylvania's 17th congressional district 1853–1855	Succeeded by David Fullerton Robison
