= C. Murray Turpin =

American politician

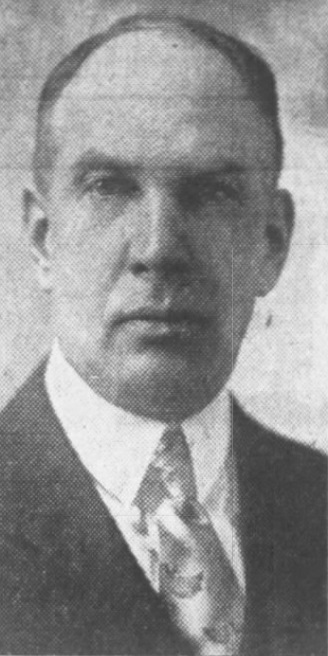
From the Wilkes-Barre Record, April 22, 1939

Charles Murray Turpin (March 4, 1878 – June 4, 1946) was a Republican member of the U.S. House of Representatives from Pennsylvania.

== Biography ==
Turpin was born in Kingston, Pennsylvania on March 4, 1878, and attended the Wyoming Seminary in Kingston.

He served as a corporal in the United States Army during the Spanish–American War in Company F of the Ninth Pennsylvania Volunteer Infantry, and was a member of the Pennsylvania National Guard from 1896 to 1901, rising to the rank of captain.

He was employed as a carpenter, grocery clerk, and a steamboat captain before graduating from the dental department of the University of Pennsylvania at Philadelphia, Pennsylvania in 1904. After graduation, he commenced the practice of dentistry in Kingston in 1905.

He served as a member of the board of education from 1916 to 1922, burgess of Kingston from 1922 to 1926, and prothonotary of Luzerne County, Pennsylvania from 1926 to 1929.

Turpin was elected as a Republican to the Seventy-first Congress to fill the vacancy caused by the death of John J. Casey. He was reelected to the Seventy-second, Seventy-third, and Seventy-fourth Congresses. He was an unsuccessful candidate for reelection in 1936.

He was appointed assistant chief clerk of the Luzerne County Assessor's Office in Wilkes-Barre, Pennsylvania.

== Death and interment ==
Turpin died in Kingston and is buried in Forty Fort Cemetery, Forty Fort, Pennsylvania.

U.S. House of Representatives
Preceded by John J. Casey	Member of the U.S. House of Representatives from Pennsylvania's 12th congressional district 1929–1937	Succeeded by J. Harold Flannery
