= Inauguration of James Buchanan =

18th United States presidential inauguration

Presidential inauguration of James Buchanan
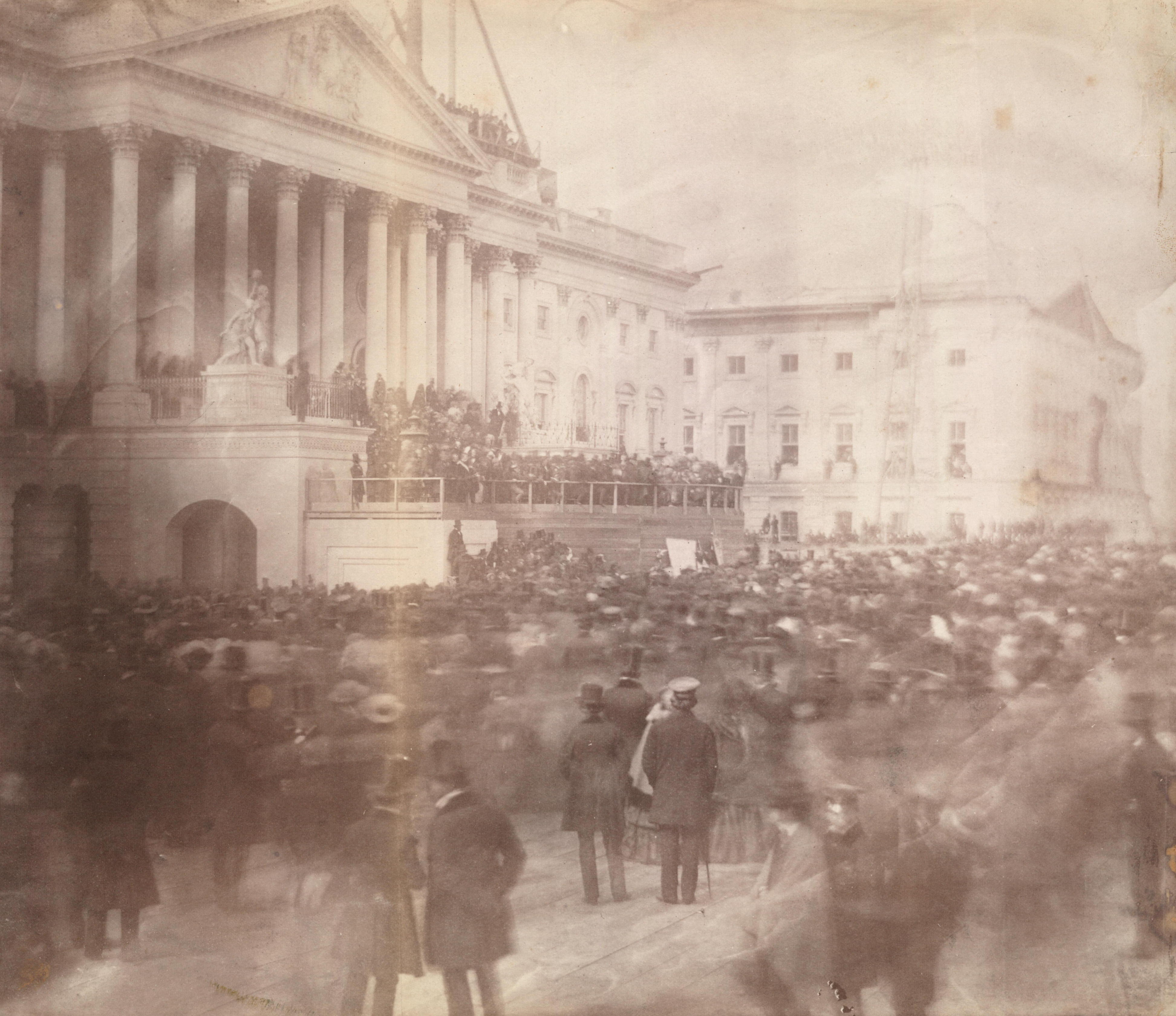
- Date: March 4, 1857; 169 years ago
- Location: United States Capitol, Washington, D.C.
- Participants: James Buchanan; 15th president of the United States — Assuming office Roger B. Taney; Chief Justice of the United States — Administering oath John C. Breckinridge; 14th vice president of the United States — Assuming office James Murray Mason; President pro tempore of the United States Senate — Administering oath

The inauguration of James Buchanan as the 15th president of the United States was held on Wednesday, March 4, 1857, at the East Portico of the United States Capitol in Washington, D.C. This was the 18th inauguration and marked the commencement of the only four-year term of both James Buchanan as president and John C. Breckinridge as vice president. Chief Justice Roger B. Taney administered the presidential oath of office. This was the first inauguration ceremony known to be photographed.

== Inaugural address ==
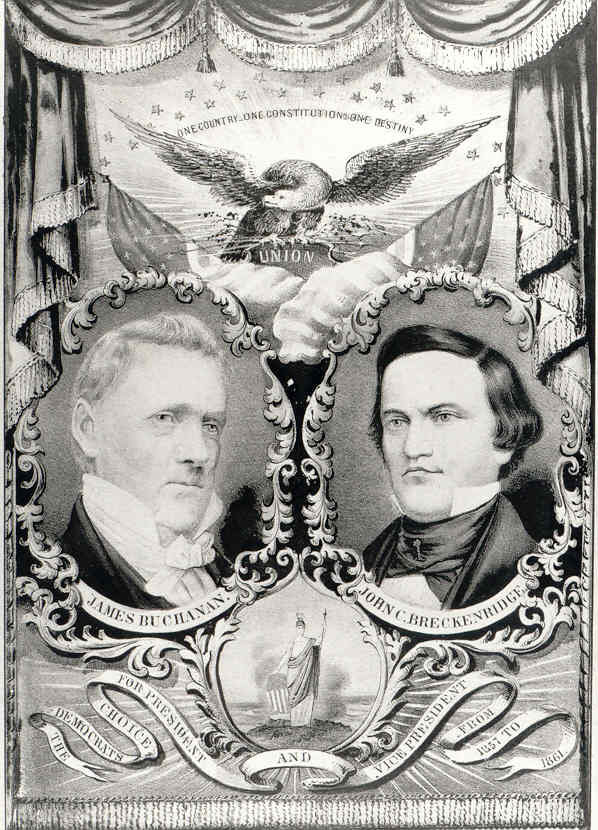
Campaign poster for Buchanan and Breckinridge

In his lengthy inaugural address, President Buchanan referred to the "Territorial Question" of slavery spreading into the West and made it clear that he was in favor of the previously passed Kansas–Nebraska Act in 1854 which allowed for popular sovereignty to decide on the issue. He did not, however, speak on the rampant voter fraud that was occurring as both Northerners and Southerners flocked to Kansas to sway the vote in their favor, nor did he speak to the violence that was occurring in the streets as a result of the tense feelings between both regions of the country.

Buchanan was criticized for not taking a strong stance on the decisive issue of slavery, and made it clear that he would "cheerfully accept" the opinion of the Supreme Court in the case of Dred Scott v. Sandford.

Additionally, Buchanan spoke at length regarding the country's economy and laid out plans for the nation's budget, including increasing the size of the Navy to protect the nation's interests in the East. Moreover, Buchanan discussed his strong feelings that a strict interpretation of the Constitution was the only safe manner in which to operate the federal government while simultaneously defending the appropriation of funds to a Trans-Atlantic road granted by Congress in order to protect California and other holdings on the Western Coast. In particular, Buchanan noted the difficulties that the Rocky Mountains would present in creating such a pathway, but defending it as a necessary work for the nation to undertake.

Buchanan rounded out his inaugural address by touting the United States' history of taking possession of new lands, stating that territories and holdings were taken peacefully, and enjoyed increased economic trade and prosperity due to the paternal influence of America.

== Political controversy ==
Buchanan was seen to hold a whispered conversation with Roger Taney (chief justice of the Supreme Court) during the festivities. This — combined with Buchanan's reference in his inaugural speech to a coming Supreme Court decision that would "speedily and finally" settle disputes over slavery in the U.S. territories, and the issuance of the Dred Scott v. Sandford ruling (supporting Buchanan's views) two days after the speech — gave rise to suspicions among many supporters of the Republican Party that Buchanan and Taney had conducted improper pre-decision consultations on the Dred Scott case at the inaugural, violating principles of executive-judicial separation. In fact, such consultations had taken place, but in written letters between Buchanan and Supreme Court judge John Catron in February.

== See also ==
- Presidency of James Buchanan
- 1856 United States presidential election
- National Hotel disease
