= Joseph E. Thropp =

American politician (1847–1927)

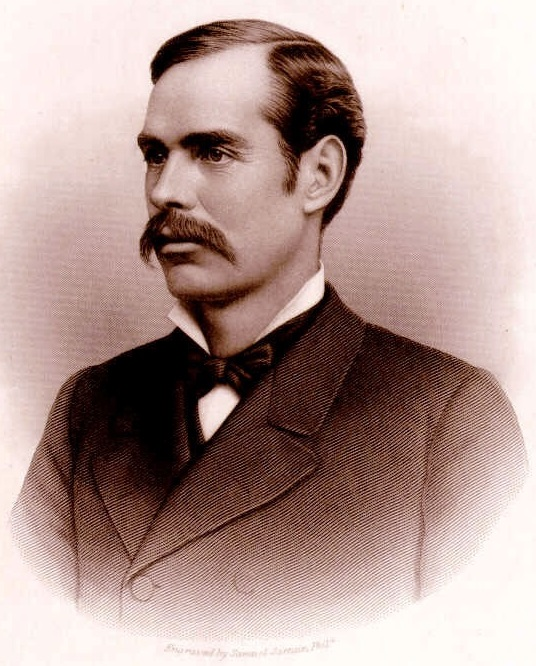
From 1884's History of Montgomery County, Pennsylvania

Joseph Earlston Thropp (October 4, 1847 – July 27, 1927) was a Republican member of the U.S. House of Representatives from Pennsylvania.

== Life ==
Joseph E. Thropp was born in Valley Forge, Pennsylvania. He attended the public schools and Friends Central High School in Philadelphia, Pennsylvania. He graduated as a civil engineer from the Polytechnic College of Pennsylvania in 1868. He went to the Middle Northwest and engaged in his profession, constructing docks at Duluth, Minnesota, and Fond du Lac, Wisconsin, attaining the position of railroad division engineer. In 1870 he moved to Conshohocken, Pennsylvania, and engaged in the manufacture of pig iron. He subsequently became owner of the Earlston Furnaces in Everett, Pennsylvania, in 1888.

Thropp was elected as a Republican to the Fifty-sixth. He was an unsuccessful candidate for reelection in 1900. He retired from active business pursuits and resided in Washington, D.C., and Miami, Florida. He died while on a visit in Quebec, Canada, in 1927. Interment in West Laurel Hill Cemetery in Bala Cynwyd, Pennsylvania.

== Sources ==
- United States Congress. "Joseph E. Thropp (id: T000248)". Biographical Directory of the United States Congress.
- The Political Graveyard

U.S. House of Representatives
| Preceded by Josiah D. Hicks | Member of the U.S. House of Representatives from Pennsylvania's 20th congressional district 1899–1901 | Succeeded by Alvin Evans |
