= Paul Leidy =

American politician

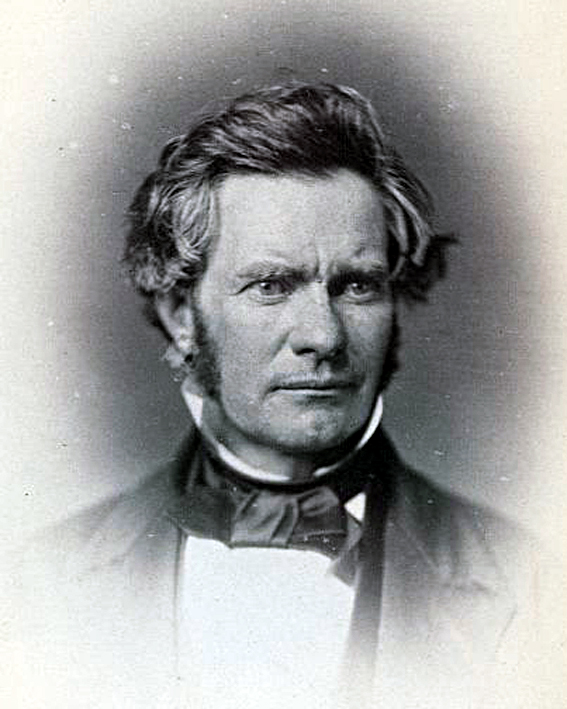

Member of the U.S. House of Representatives from Pennsylvania's 12th district
- In office December 7, 1857 – March 3, 1859
- Preceded by: John G. Montgomery
- Succeeded by: George W. Scranton

Personal details
- Born: November 13, 1813 Hemlock Township, Pennsylvania
- Died: September 11, 1877 (aged 63) Danville, Pennsylvania
- Party: Democratic

Paul Leidy (November 13, 1813 – September 11, 1877) was a Democratic member of the U.S. House of Representatives from Pennsylvania, serving one term from 1857 to 1859.

== Biography ==
Born in Hemlock Township, Pennsylvania on November 13, 1813, Paul Leidy was a son of John and Sarah (Girton) Leidy. His father died when Paul was in his teens; a guardian, Samuel Brugler, was appointed for him in 1831. He attended the common schools and apprenticed as a tailor at roughly the age of sixteen.

He taught school in Danville, Pennsylvania, for several years beginning sometime around 1838 while also pursuing additional studies in law.

He was then admitted to the bar in 1837 and opened a law practice in Danville. His obituary states that, "He applied himself diligently to his chosen profession and built up a lucrative practice."

He served as district attorney of Montour County, Pennsylvania from 1852 to 1857.

=== Congress ===
Leidy was elected as a Democrat to the Thirty-fifth Congress to fill the vacancy caused by the death of John G. Montgomery. During his term, congress was involved in the dispute regarding the admission of Kansas as a state, a topic on which Leidy addressed the House (30 March 1858). He was an unsuccessful candidate for reelection in 1858.

=== Personal life ===
Paul Leidy was married three times. He married Jane Fruit Kitchen in 1842, by whom he had seven children. He was married to Eloise Hill in 1870, and was also married to Margaret Montgomery.

=== Death ===
Leidy died in Danville on September 11, 1877, and was interred in the Odd Fellows Cemetery.

== Sources ==
- United States Congress. "Paul Leidy (id: L000231)". Biographical Directory of the United States Congress.
- The Political Graveyard

U.S. House of Representatives
Preceded by John Gallagher Montgomery	Member of the U.S. House of Representatives from Pennsylvania's 12th congressional district 1857–1859	Succeeded by George W. Scranton
