= National Hotel disease =

1857 mysterious sickness in Washington, D.C.

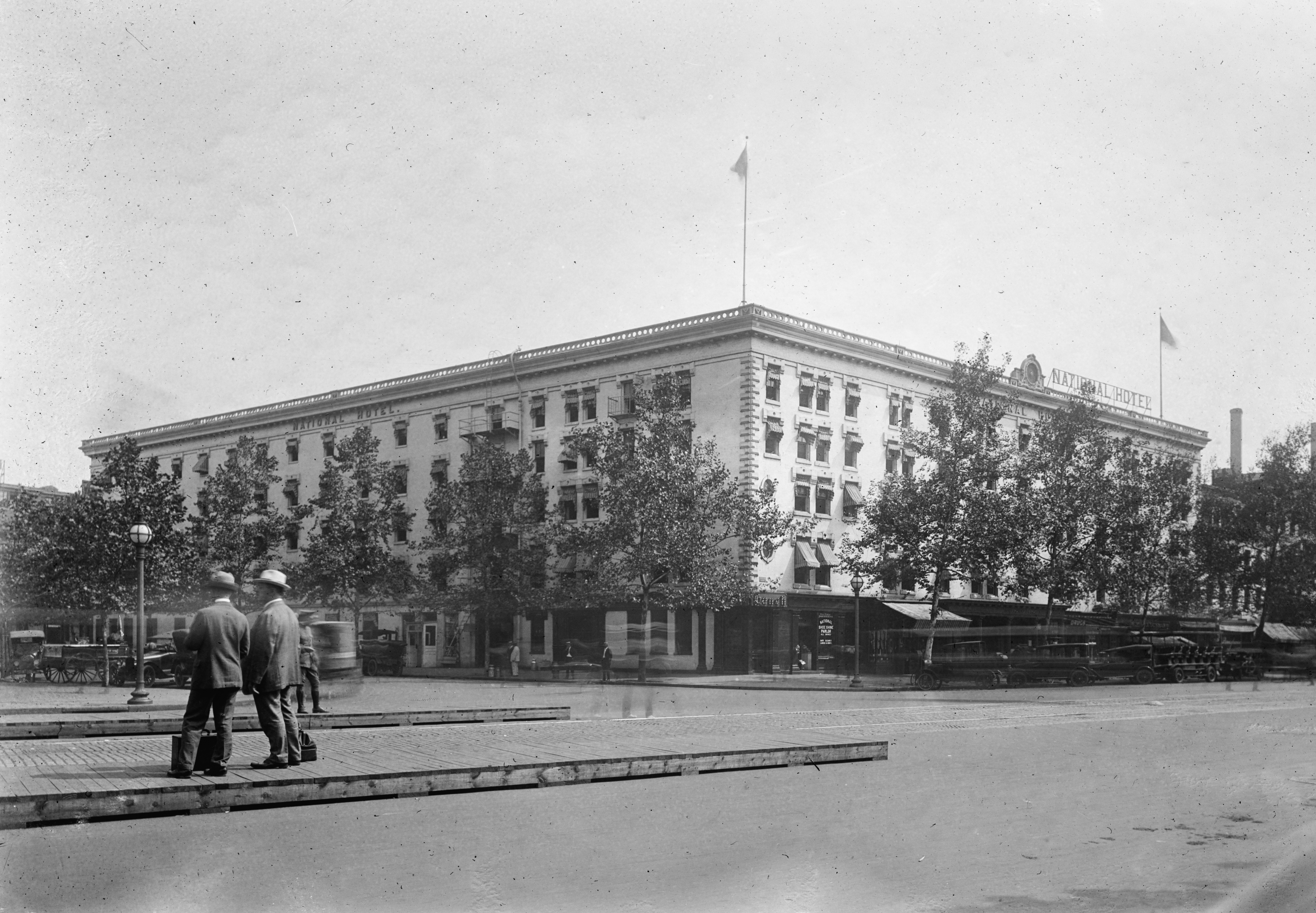
The National Hotel in Washington, D.C., the site of the mysterious disease

The National Hotel epidemic was a mysterious sickness that began to afflict persons who stayed at the National Hotel in Washington, D.C., in early January 1857. At the time, the hotel was the largest in the city. By some accounts, as many as 400 people became sick, and nearly three dozen died.

Although there was speculation of an attempt to poison hotel guests, that theory was not proven. The outbreak affected mostly patrons of the hotel's dining room but not those who frequented the bar. It began to spread more noticeably by mid-January 1857. New cases of the illness began to decrease in number by the end of January 1857 and continued to abate until mid-February. When the numbers of guests increased for the presidential inauguration of March 4, 1857, the sickness returned again forcefully.

In the 21st century, medical experts attribute the outbreak to "dysentery because of the hotel’s primitive sewage system".

== Symptoms ==
The National Hotel epidemic manifested itself as a persistent diarrhea, which was often accompanied by an intense colic. Those affected experienced sudden prostration along with nausea. Patients' tongues generally indicated an inflammation of the mucous membranes of their stomachs. Affected individuals often complained of recurrences of symptoms even after they had left the National Hotel. Aside from a sudden onset of diarrhea, which happened generally in the early morning, vomiting occurred after the diarrhea ceased.

Major George McNeir, 64, of Washington, D.C., dined at the National Hotel during the first outbreak of the epidemic. Dr. Jas J. Waring was among the physicians who performed an autopsy on McNeir. He was the only person whose body was subjected to a post-mortem examination after he had died from the sickness. Waring stated that there was no incubation period before the onset of McNeir's illness. McNeir had been affected when he went to bed after dinner, and the symptoms never left him until his death.

== Theories ==
A physician quoted by Philadelphia's The Times newspaper vocalized the poison theory. However, dissenters contended that poisoned water was improbable because the National Hotel's water tank was used only for washing. Drinking water was brought to the establishment from a distance. In an effort to eliminate rats from the National Hotel, arsenic was used. One of the poisoned rats was discovered in the water tank after guests had become ill with the sickness.

The Mayor of Washington, D.C., together with a committee chosen by the board of health, submitted a report that denied that any mineral poisoning was ingested in the stomachs of victims of the epidemic. There was no evidence of inflammation of the intestines. The committee contended that the disease was transmitted by inhalation of a poisonous miasma, which originated from the decomposition of vegetables and animals. It thought that the infection had entered the National Hotel from a sewer, which was connected to the Sixth Street sewer.

A sewer builder noticed a sewer opening in the southwest corner of the National Hotel that connected with the sewer leading into the street. Through the opening proceeded a constant fetid gas, which was coming in rapidly enough to extinguish a candle flame, according to the individual's estimation. The committee looked into but found no evidence of water poisoning, food poisoning, or arsenic poisoning.

== Deaths ==
Among the three dozen or so deaths were several members of Congress:

- Representative John Montgomery of Pennsylvania died in April 1857.
- Representative John Quitman of Mississippi died in July 1858 from the disease's aftereffects. He had also served as a major general during the Mexican–American War.
- Former Representative David Robison of Pennsylvania died in June 1859 of complications from the disease, which he had contracted at the hotel.

President James Buchanan's nephew also died from the epidemic. He had originally been set to be his uncle's personal secretary.

== Site ==
The National Hotel was built in the late 1820s. After other mishaps, including a fire in 1921, it was acquired in 1929 by the District of Columbia municipal government and was demolished in 1942. The site was occupied by the Newseum until it closed in December 2019.

== See also ==
- Havana syndrome
