= Edmund N. Carpenter =

American politician (1865–1952)

Edmund Nelson Carpenter
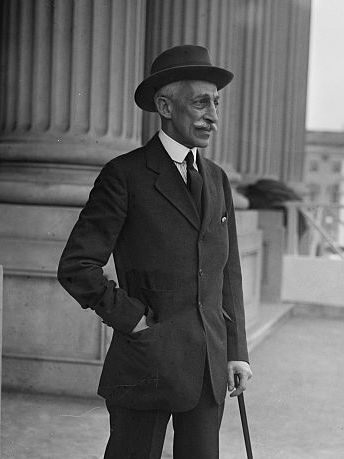

Member of the U.S. House of Representatives from Pennsylvania's 12th district
- In office March 4, 1925 – March 3, 1927
- Preceded by: John J. Casey
- Succeeded by: John J. Casey

Personal details
- Born: June 27, 1865 Wilkes-Barre, Pennsylvania, US
- Died: November 4, 1952 (aged 87)
- Party: Republican

Edmund Nelson Carpenter (June 27, 1865 – November 4, 1952) was a Republican member of the U.S. House of Representatives from Pennsylvania.

Edmund N. Carpenter was born in Wilkes-Barre, Pennsylvania. His parents were Benjamin Gardner Carpenter and Sarah Ann Feld and he was one of five children. He is a descendant of the immigrant William Carpenter (1605 England – 1658/1659 Rehoboth, Massachusetts) the founder of the Rehoboth Carpenter family who came to America in the mid-1630s.

He attended the Wyoming Seminary in Kingston, Pennsylvania. He was interested in mining and the manufacture of sheet-metal products. He enlisted as a private in 1893 and attained the rank of major in the Pennsylvania National Guard. During the Spanish–American War, Carpenter served as first lieutenant and quartermaster in the Ninth Regiment of the Pennsylvania Volunteer Infantry, from 1898 to 1898. He was an unsuccessful candidate for election in 1918.

Carpenter was elected as a Republican to the Sixty-ninth Congress. He was an unsuccessful candidate for reelection in 1926. He resumed his manufacturing interests, and died in Philadelphia, Pennsylvania. Interment in Hollenback Cemetery in Wilkes-Barre.

== See also ==
- List of United States representatives from Pennsylvania

== Sources ==
- United States Congress. "Edmund N. Carpenter (id: C000168)". Biographical Directory of the United States Congress. Retrieved on 2008-02-10
- The Political Graveyard

U.S. House of Representatives
Preceded by John J. Casey	Member of the U.S. House of Representatives from Pennsylvania's 12th congressional district 1925–1927	Succeeded by John J. Casey
