= Wilson Reilly =

American politician

Wilson Reilly (August 8, 1811 – August 26, 1885) was a Democratic member of the U.S. House of Representatives from Pennsylvania.

== Biography ==
Wilson Reilly was born in Waynesboro, Pennsylvania. He attended the common schools, and was engaged as a hatter in Waynesboro and Chambersburg, Pennsylvania. He studied law, was admitted to the bar in 1837 and commenced practice in Chambersburg. He served as prosecuting attorney of Franklin County, Pennsylvania, from 1842 to 1845. He was an unsuccessful Democratic candidate for election in 1854.

Reilly was elected as a Democrat to the Thirty-fifth Congress. He served as chairman of the United States House Committee on Expenditures in the Department of War during the Thirty-fifth Congress. He was unsuccessful candidate for reelection in 1858. He became captain of the McClure Rifles and joined the Pennsylvania Reserve Corps at Camp Curtin in Harrisburg, Pennsylvania. He resumed the practice of law. In 1885, he and died in Chambersburg and was buried in Falling Spring Cemetery.

U.S. House of Representatives
Preceded by David F. Robison	Member of the U.S. House of Representatives from Pennsylvania's 17th congressional district 1857–1859	Succeeded by Edward McPherson
