= George A. Woodward =

United States Army general

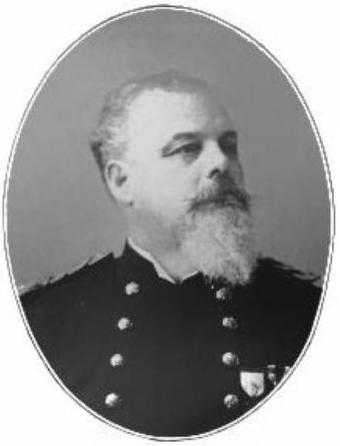
- Born: George Abisha Woodward; February 14, 1835; Wilkes-Barre, Pennsylvania
- Died: December 22, 1916 (aged 81); Washington, D.C.
- Education: Trinity College
- Occupation(s): Jurist, military officer
- Spouse: Charlotte Treat Chittenden (m. 1867)
- Father: George Washington Woodward

George Abisha Woodward (February 14, 1835 – December 22, 1916) was a jurist and a colonel in the United States Army, who was made a brigadier general on the retired list in recognition of his military service between 1861 and 1879.

== Biography ==
Woodward was born on February 14, 1835, in Wilkes-Barre, Pennsylvania. His father was U.S. Representative George Washington Woodward. He obtained a B.A. from Trinity College in 1855 and married Charlotte Treat Chittenden on February 14, 1867. Later he would be admitted to the bar and become City Attorney of Milwaukee, Wisconsin, from 1858 to 1859. Woodward died at Walter Reed Hospital on December 22, 1916, and is buried with Charlotte at Arlington National Cemetery.

== Military career ==
Woodward was originally commissioned as a captain in the Union Army in 1861. Engagements he participated in include the Battle of Glendale and the Battle of Gettysburg. Following the war he would serve in the 14th Infantry Regiment and the 15th Infantry Regiment. He retired in 1879 as a colonel but was made a brigadier general on the retired list in 1904.

Awards he received include the Civil War Campaign Medal.
