= Josiah D. Hicks =

American politician

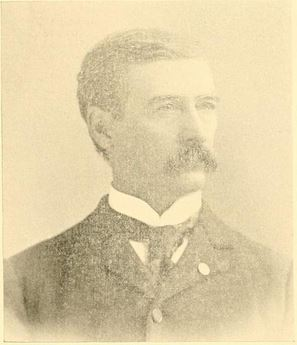

Member of the U.S. House of Representatives from Pennsylvania's 20th district
- In office March 4, 1893 – March 3, 1899
- Preceded by: Edward Scull
- Succeeded by: Joseph Earlston Thropp

Personal details
- Born: August 1, 1844 Machen, Monmouthshire, Wales, U.K.
- Died: May 9, 1923 (aged 78) Altoona, Pennsylvania, U.S.
- Party: Republican

Military service
- Allegiance: United States
- Branch/service: United States Army
- Rank: Private
- Battles/wars: American Civil War

Josiah Duane Hicks (August 1, 1844 – May 9, 1923) was a Republican member of the U.S. House of Representatives from Pennsylvania.

== Biography ==
Josiah D. Hicks was born in Machen, Monmouthshire, Wales. He immigrated to the United States with his parents, who settled in Chester County, Pennsylvania, in 1847, and in the same year moved to Duncansville, Pennsylvania. He attended the common schools of Blair and Huntingdon Counties. He moved to Altoona, Pennsylvania, in 1861.

During the American Civil War, he enlisted in the One Hundred and Twenty-fifth Regiment, Pennsylvania Volunteer Infantry, as a private in 1862 and served nearly eighteen months. He reentered civil life as a clerk on the Pennsylvania Railroad. He studied law, was admitted to the bar in 1875 and commenced practice in Tyrone, Pennsylvania. He was elected district attorney of Blair County in 1880, and reelected in 1883.

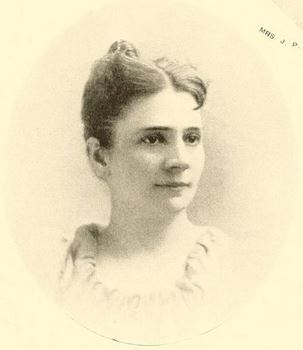
Josephine Barrick

He married Josephine Barrick, a native of Frederick county, MD. She descended from the Harbaugh family. The history of the family is almost coextensive with the history of the country. The Harbaughs settled in Maryland in colonial times.

Hicks was elected as a Republican to the Fifty-third, Fifty-fourth, and Fifty-fifth Congresses. He served as chairman of the United States House Committee on Patents during the Fifty-fifth Congress. He was not a candidate for renomination in 1898. He resumed the practice of law, and served as a member of the Altoona Board of Education from 1911 to 1919. He served as State commander of the Grand Army of the Republic in 1921. He died in Altoona in 1923 and is interred in Fairview Cemetery.

U.S. House of Representatives
Preceded by Edward Scull	Member of the U.S. House of Representatives from Pennsylvania's 20th congressional district 1893–1899	Succeeded by Joseph E. Thropp
