= Henry Mills Fuller =

American politician (1820–1860)

Henry M. Fuller
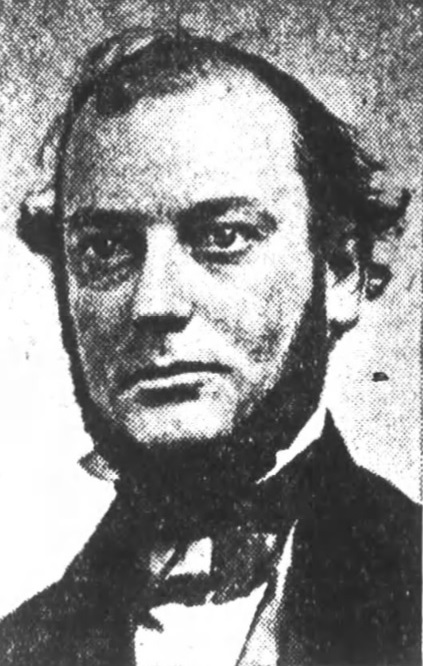
- Contemporary photo reproduced in the Wilkes-Barre Record for November 2, 1929

Member of the U.S. House of Representatives from Pennsylvania
- In office March 4, 1851 – March 3, 1853
- Preceded by: John Brisbin
- Succeeded by: Christian Markle Straub
- Constituency: 11th district
- In office March 4, 1855 – March 3, 1857
- Preceded by: Hendrick Bradley Wright
- Succeeded by: John Gallagher Montgomery
- Constituency: 12th district

Member of the Pennsylvania House of Representatives
- In office 1848-1849

Personal details
- Born: January 3, 1820 Bethany, Pennsylvania, U.S.
- Died: December 26, 1860 (aged 40) Philadelphia, Pennsylvania, U.S.
- Party: Whig
- Education: Princeton University

Henry Mills Fuller (January 3, 1820 – December 26, 1860) was a Whig member of the U.S. House of Representatives from Pennsylvania.

== Biography ==
Henry M. Fuller was born in Bethany, Pennsylvania. He graduated from Princeton College in 1839. He studied law, was admitted to the bar January 3, 1842, and commenced practice in Wilkes-Barre, Pennsylvania. He was a member of the Pennsylvania House of Representatives in 1848 and 1849.

Fuller was elected as a Whig to the Thirty-second Congress. He was an unsuccessful candidate for reelection in 1852. He was reelected as a Whig to the Thirty-fourth Congress. He was not a candidate for renomination in 1856. He was running for the Speakership of the House of Representatives, but he was in favor of the Missouri Compromise. A newspaper in Missouri said "We would not care if H.M. Fuller was a Southern man and owned every Negro in Louisiana ... we would spurn him." He resumed the practice of law, and died in Philadelphia in 1860. Interment in Hollenback Cemetery in Wilkes-Barre, Pennsylvania.

== Sources ==
- United States Congress. "Henry Mills Fuller (id: F000410)". Biographical Directory of the United States Congress.
- The Political Graveyard

U.S. House of Representatives
Preceded by John Brisbin	Member of the U.S. House of Representatives from Pennsylvania's 11th congressional district 1851–1853	Succeeded by Christian M. Straub
Preceded by Hendrick B. Wright	Member of the U.S. House of Representatives from Pennsylvania's 12th congressional district 1855–1857	Succeeded by John G. Montgomery
