= Jacob M. Campbell =

American politician (1821–1888)

Jacob Miller Campbell
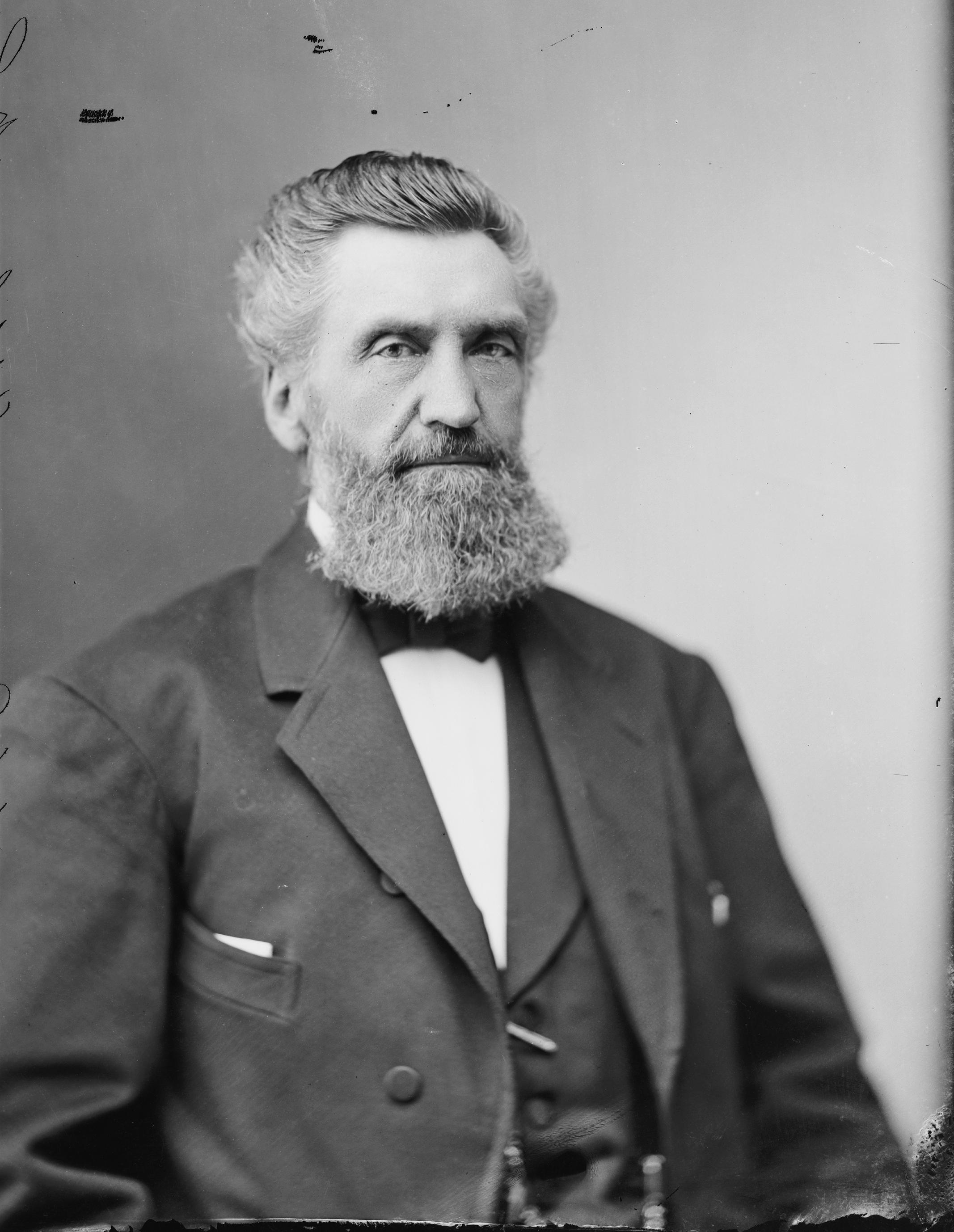

Member of the U.S. House of Representatives from Pennsylvania's 17th district
- In office March 4, 1881 – March 3, 1887
- Preceded by: Alexander H. Coffroth
- Succeeded by: Edward Scull
- In office March 4, 1877 – March 3, 1879
- Preceded by: John Reilly
- Succeeded by: Alexander H. Coffroth

Personal details
- Born: November 20, 1821 Somerset, Pennsylvania, U.S.
- Died: September 27, 1888 (aged 66)
- Party: Republican

Jacob Miller Campbell (November 20, 1821 – September 27, 1888) was a Republican member of the U.S. House of Representatives from Pennsylvania. He also served as an officer and, later on, served more roles in the Union Army during the American Civil War.

== Early life ==
Jacob M. Campbell was born at "White Horse," near Somerset, Pennsylvania. He moved with his parents to Allegheny City, Pennsylvania, in 1826. He attended the public schools and learned the art of printing in the office of the Somerset Whig.

He was later connected with a magazine publishing company in Pittsburgh and with leading newspapers in New Orleans, Louisiana. He was engaged in steamboating on the lower Mississippi River from 1841 to 1847 and in gold mining in California in 1851. He aided in the building of the Cambria Iron Works in Johnstown, Pennsylvania, in 1853, and was employed by that company until 1861, when he resigned. Campbell was a delegate to the first Republican National Convention at Philadelphia in 1856.

== Civil War ==
Campbell served in the Union Army as a first lieutenant and quartermaster of Company G, Third Regiment, Pennsylvania Volunteer Infantry. He recruited the 54th Pennsylvania Volunteer Infantry and was commissioned its colonel on February 27, 1862. He was brevetted as a brigadier general in the 1866 omnibus promotions following the war, to date from March 13, 1865.

== Postbellum ==
After the war, Campbell returned to Johnstown, Pennsylvania, and served as surveyor general (later secretary of internal affairs) of Pennsylvania from 1865 to 1871.

Campbell was elected as a Republican to the Forty-fifth Congress. He was an unsuccessful candidate for reelection in 1878. He was again elected to the Forty-seventh, Forty-eighth, and Forty-ninth Congresses. He served as chairman of the United States House Committee on Manufactures during the Forty-seventh Congress. He was an unsuccessful candidate for renomination in 1886.

He remained financially interested in banking and in the manufacture of steel, and served as chairman of the Republican State convention in 1887.

Jacob Campbell died in Johnstown in 1888. He was interred there in Grandview Cemetery, Johnstown.

== See also ==
- List of American Civil War brevet generals (Union)

U.S. House of Representatives
Preceded by John Reilly	Member of the U.S. House of Representatives from Pennsylvania's 17th congressional district 1877–1879	Succeeded by Alexander H. Coffroth
Preceded by Alexander H. Coffroth	Member of the U.S. House of Representatives from Pennsylvania's 17th congressional district 1881–1887	Succeeded by Edward Scull
