= Edward Scull =

American politician

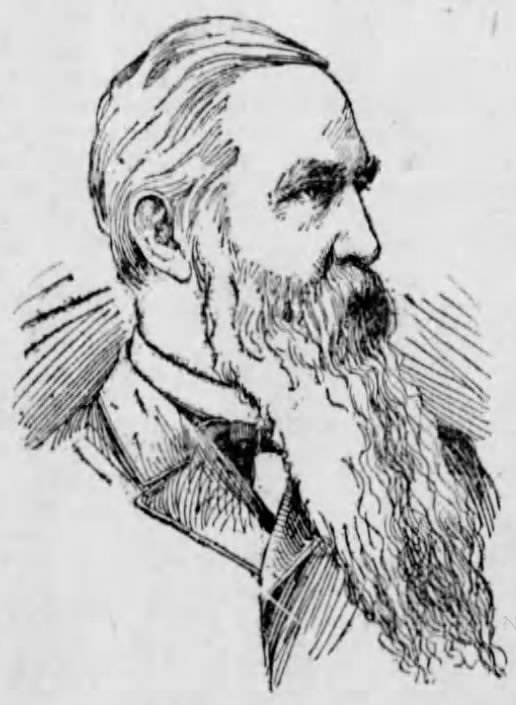

Member of the U.S. House of Representatives from Pennsylvania
- In office March 4, 1887 – March 3, 1893
- Preceded by: Jacob M. Campbell (17th); John Patton (20th)
- Succeeded by: Charles R. Buckalew (17th); Josiah D. Hicks (20th)
- Constituency: 17th district (1887-89); 20th district (1889-93)

Member of the Pennsylvania State Senate for the 20th district
- In office 1871
- Preceded by: Hiram Findlay
- Succeeded by: William Henry Stanton

Personal details
- Born: February 5, 1818 Pittsburgh, Pennsylvania, U.S.
- Died: July 10, 1900 (aged 82) Somerset, Pennsylvania, U.S.
- Party: Republican
- Spouse: Mary Ogle

Edward Scull (February 5, 1818 – July 10, 1900) was an American politician from Pennsylvania who served as a Republican member of the U.S. House of Representatives for Pennsylvania's 17th congressional district from 1887 to 1889 and 20th congressional district from 1889 to 1893.

== Biography ==
Scull was born in Pittsburgh, Pennsylvania. He attended the common schools in Pittsburgh and preparatory school in Steubenville, Ohio. He studied law and was admitted to the Westmoreland County bar in 1844. He moved to Somerset, Pennsylvania in 1846 and practiced law until 1857. He served as prothonotary and clerk of the court for three years.

He was appointed collector of internal revenue for the Sixteenth district of Pennsylvania by President Abraham Lincoln in 1863. He was removed by President Andrew Johnson in September 1866. He served as a member of the Pennsylvania State Senate for the 20th district in 1871. He served as a delegate to the Republican National Conventions in 1864, 1876, and 1884. He was appointed assessor of internal revenue by President Ulysses S. Grant in April 1869, and again appointed collector, on March 22, 1873, and served until August 1883, when the district was consolidated with another. He published and edited the Somerset Herald from 1852 to 1887 and worked as president of the First National Bank of Somerset until his death.

Scull was elected as a Republican to the Fiftieth, Fifty-first, and Fifty-second Congresses. After his time in Congress, he retired to Somerset. He died in Somerset.

== Sources ==
- United States Congress. "Edward Scull (id: S000205)". Biographical Directory of the United States Congress.
- Edward Scull at The Political Graveyard

Pennsylvania State Senate
Preceded by Hiram Findlay	Member of the Pennsylvania Senate, 20th district 1871	Succeeded by William Henry Stanton
U.S. House of Representatives
Preceded by Jacob M. Campbell	Member of the U.S. House of Representatives from Pennsylvania's 17th congressional district 1887–1889	Succeeded by Charles R. Buckalew
Preceded by John Patton	Member of the U.S. House of Representatives from Pennsylvania's 20th congressional district 1889–1893	Succeeded by Josiah D. Hicks
