= Pennsylvania's 12th congressional district =

U.S. House district for Pennsylvania

Coordinates: 40°25′42″N 79°29′11″W

- Interactive map of district boundaries since January 3, 2023 (Allegheny County outlined in red)
- Representative: Summer Lee; D–Swissvale
- Population (2025): 754,003
- Median household income: $73,154
- Ethnicity: 72.9% White; 15.1% Black; 4.5% Asian; 4.1% Two or more races; 2.8% Hispanic; 0.7% other
- Cook PVI: D+10

Pennsylvania's 12th congressional district is located in southwestern Pennsylvania, including all of the City of Pittsburgh and much of Allegheny County, as well as some of Westmoreland County. Since January 3, 2023, it has been represented by Summer Lee.

Before 2018, the 12th district was located in southwestern Pennsylvania and included all of Beaver County, and parts of Allegheny, Cambria, Lawrence, Somerset, and Westmoreland Counties. The Supreme Court of Pennsylvania redrew this and other state congressional districts in February 2018 after ruling the previous map unconstitutional due to partisan gerrymandering. The new 12th district covers much of the old 10th district. The old 12th district was redrawn to an area north and west of Pittsburgh and renamed the 17th district for the 2018 elections and representation after that.

Before the 2011 round of redistricting, the 12th district was widely considered to be gerrymandered by the Republican-controlled state legislature as a heavily Democratic district. It consisted of all of Greene County, and parts of Allegheny, Armstrong, Cambria, Fayette, Indiana, Somerset, Washington, and Westmoreland Counties.

== Recent election results from statewide races ==
Year	Office	Results
2008	President	Obama 59% – 40%
2008	Attorney General	Morganelli 51% – 49%
2008	Auditor General	Wagner 75% – 25%
2010	Senate	Sestak 57% – 43%
2010	Governor	Onorato 52% – 48%
2012	President	Obama 60% – 40%
2012	Senate	Casey Jr. 63% – 37%
2014	Governor	Wolf 61% – 39%
2016	President	Clinton 57% – 40%
2016	Senate	McGinty 57% – 39%
2016	Attorney General	Shapiro 61% – 39%
2016	Auditor General	DePasquale 64% – 31%
2016	Treasurer	Torsella 61% – 33%
2018	Senate	Casey Jr. 66% – 32%
2018	Governor	Wolf 68% – 31%
2020	President	Biden 59% – 39%
2020	Attorney General	Shapiro 62% – 34%
2020	Auditor General	Ahmad 57% – 39%
2020	Treasurer	Torsella 58% – 38%
2022	Senate	Fetterman 63% – 35%
2022	Governor	Shapiro 68% – 30%
2024	President	Harris 59% – 40%
2024	Senate	Casey Jr. 59% – 38%
2024	Attorney General	DePasquale 59% – 38%
2024	Auditor General	Kenyatta 57% – 40%
2024	Treasurer	McClelland 57% – 41%

== History ==
After the 2000 census, the Republican-controlled state legislature radically altered the 12th to get more Republicans elected from traditionally heavily Democratic southwestern Pennsylvania. A large chunk of the old 20th district was incorporated into the 12th. In some parts of the western portion of the district, one side of the street is in the 12th, while the other is in the 18th district (the reconfigured 20th). This led to criticism that the 12th was a gerrymander intended to pack as many of southwestern Pennsylvania's heavily Democratic areas as possible into just two districts—the 12th and the Pittsburgh-based 14th.

Located in southwestern Pennsylvania, the 12th district consisted of all of Greene County, and parts of Allegheny, Armstrong, Cambria, Fayette, Indiana, Somerset, Washington, and Westmoreland Counties. A thoroughly unionized district, the 12th was historically among the most Democratic areas of the state. However, the Democrats in this area were not as liberal as their counterparts in Philadelphia and Pittsburgh. Most were somewhat conservative on social issues, particularly abortion and gun control.

The 12th included all of Greene County, a highly rural region that still has a traditionally Democratic influence due to its labor leanings. In Washington county, the city of Washington and eastern portions of the county, a large and Democratic edge suburb of Pittsburgh, was a part of the 12th. Most of the Monongahela Valley region, a very Democratic area once an important steel-making area, was also part of the 12th. However, more rural western Washington County and the suburban northern portion of the county (with towns like McDonald and Canonsburg) then belonged to the 18th. The western portion of Fayette County, including the city of Uniontown, a labor Democratic stronghold, was part of this district. In contrast, the rural mountainous eastern portion was a part of the 9th.

The 12th district continued eastward, including southeastern and northeastern parts of Westmoreland County, including the labor Democratic city of Latrobe, while leaving the suburban western part of the county (with towns such as Murrysville) and the generally left-leaning city of Greensburg in the 18th. The major population base of the district was located just to the east, taking in most of Somerset and Cambria counties. This area, the heart of a sizeable coal-mining region, includes the district's largest city, Johnstown. The 12th also contained a part of Indiana County, mainly the college town of Indiana.

The 12th completed its wrap around the metro Pittsburgh region by ending in the northeastern corner of the city's suburbs, containing middle-class regions such as Lower Burrell and the working-class suburb of New Kensington. A portion of Armstrong County was also included in the district, including several industrial suburbs such as Freeport and Apollo. The district is notable as the only congressional district in the nation that voted for Democratic presidential candidate John Kerry in 2004 but went for Republican John McCain in 2008. This is mainly because, since 2000, southwestern Pennsylvania has gradually become more Republican.

=== 2006 election ===
In the 2006 election, Murtha was re-elected with 61% of the vote. His Republican opponent, Washington County Commissioner Diana Irey, received 39%.

=== 2008 election ===
John Murtha won the 2008 election with 58% of the vote. Murtha was a United States Marine and the first Vietnam War veteran to serve in Congress. He defeated Lt. Col. William T. Russell, an army veteran.

=== 2010 special election ===
Pennsylvania governor Ed Rendell scheduled a special election for May 18, 2010, following the death of Representative John Murtha. On March 8, 2010, the Pennsylvania Democratic Party's Executive Committee nominated Mark Critz, Murtha's former district director. On March 11, a convention of Republicans from the 12th district nominated businessman Tim Burns. The Libertarian Party's candidate was Demo Agoris, who ran for the Pennsylvania House of Representatives in the 48th district as a Libertarian in 2006.

Mark Critz won the election.

=== 2010 election ===
Mark Critz was re-elected in the regularly scheduled 2010 election, again beating Republican Tim Burns (this time with 51% of the vote against 49%).

=== 2012 election ===
Mark Critz ran for re-election to a second full term in the 2012 election but was defeated by Republican challenger Keith Rothfus. Critz garnered 48.5% of the vote to Rothfus' 51.5%. The 12th had absorbed a large chunk of the old 4th district, including Rothfus' home, after the 2010 census, and was significantly more Republican than its predecessor.

=== 2019 special election ===
After Tom Marino's resignation in January 2019, an election was held on May 21 to fill the open seat. Republican Fred Keller defeated 2018 Democratic nominee Mark Friedenberg.

== Counties and municipalities ==
Allegheny County (46)

Baldwin, Bethel Park, Braddock, Brentwood, Bridgeville, Chalfant, Clairton, Dravosburg, Duquesne, East McKeesport, East Pittsburgh, Elizabeth Borough, Elizabeth Township, Forward Township, Glassport, Homestead, Jefferson Hills, Liberty, Lincoln, McKeesport, Monroeville, Mount Oliver, Munhall, North Braddock, North Versailles Township, Pitcairn, Pittsburgh, Pleasant Hills, Plum, Port Vue, Rankin, South Park Township, South Versailles Township, Swissvale (part; also 17th), Trafford (shared with Westmoreland County) Turtle Creek, Upper St. Clair Township, Versailles, Wall, West Elizabeth, West Homestead, West Mifflin, Whitaker, Whitehall, White Oak, Wilkins Township, Wilmerding

Westmoreland County (17)

Adamsburg, Arona, Export, Hempfield Township (part; also 14th), Irwin, Jeannette, Madison, Manor, Murrysville, North Huntingdon Township, North Irwin, Penn Borough, Penn Township, Sewickley Township, South Huntingdon Township (part; also 14th), Sutersville, Trafford (shared with Allegheny County)

== List of members representing the district ==
Representative	Party	Years	Cong ress	Electoral history	Location
District established March 4, 1795
Albert Gallatin (Springhill Township)	Democratic-Republican	March 4, 1795 – May 14, 1801	4th 5th 6th 7th	Elected in 1794. Re-elected in 1796. Re-elected in 1798. Re-elected in 1800 but declined the seat to become U.S. Secretary of the Treasury.	1795–1803 [data missing]
Vacant		May 14, 1801 – December 7, 1801	7th		1795–1803 [data missing]
William Hoge (Washington)	Democratic-Republican	December 7, 1801 – March 3, 1803	7th	Elected October 13, 1801, to finish Gallatin's term and seated December 7, 1801. Redistricted to the 10th district.	1795–1803 [data missing]
District dissolved March 3, 1803
District re-established March 4, 1813
Aaron Lyle (West Middletown)	Democratic-Republican	March 4, 1813 – March 3, 1817	13th 14th	Redistricted from the 10th district and re-elected in 1812. Re-elected in 1814. Retired.	1813–1823 [data missing]
Thomas Patterson (West Middletown)	Democratic-Republican	March 4, 1817 – March 3, 1823	15th 16th 17th	Elected in 1816. Re-elected in 1818. Re-elected in 1820. Redistricted to the 15th district.	1813–1823 [data missing]
John Brown (Lewistown)	Democratic-Republican	March 4, 1823 – March 3, 1825	18th	Redistricted from the 9th district and re-elected in 1822. Lost re-election.	1823–1833 [data missing]
John Mitchell (Bellefonte)	Jacksonian	March 4, 1825 – March 3, 1829	19th 20th	Elected in 1824. Re-elected in 1826. Retired.	1823–1833 [data missing]
John Scott (Alexandria)	Jacksonian	March 4, 1829 – March 3, 1831	21st	Elected in 1828. Lost re-election.	1823–1833 [data missing]
Robert Allison (Huntingdon)	Anti-Masonic	March 4, 1831 – March 3, 1833	22nd	Elected in 1830. Retired.	1823–1833 [data missing]
George Chambers (Chambersburg)	Anti-Masonic	March 4, 1833 – March 3, 1837	23rd 24th	Elected in 1832. Re-elected in 1834. [data missing]	1833–1843 [data missing]
Daniel Sheffer (York)	Democratic	March 4, 1837 – March 3, 1839	25th	Elected in 1836. Lost re-election.	1833–1843 [data missing]
James Cooper (Gettysburg)	Whig	March 4, 1839 – March 3, 1843	26th 27th	Elected in 1838. Re-elected in 1840. [data missing]	1833–1843 [data missing]
Almon H. Read (Montrose)	Democratic	March 4, 1843 – June 3, 1844	28th	Redistricted from the 17th district and re-elected in 1842. Died.	1843–1853 [data missing]
Vacant		June 3, 1844 – December 2, 1844	28th		1843–1853 [data missing]
George Fuller (Montrose)	Democratic	December 2, 1844 – March 3, 1845	28th	Elected to finish Read's term. [data missing]	1843–1853 [data missing]
David Wilmot (Towanda)	Democratic	March 4, 1845 – March 3, 1851	29th 30th 31st	Elected in 1844. Re-elected in 1846. Re-elected in 1848. Retired.	1843–1853 [data missing]
Galusha A. Grow (Glenwood)	Democratic	March 4, 1851 – March 3, 1853	32nd	Elected in 1850. Redistricted to the 14th district.	1843–1853 [data missing]
Hendrick B. Wright (Wilkes-Barre)	Democratic	March 4, 1853 – March 3, 1855	33rd	Elected in 1852. Lost re-election.	1853–1863 [data missing]
Henry M. Fuller (Wilkes-Barre)	Opposition	March 4, 1855 – March 3, 1857	34th	Elected in 1854. Retired.	1853–1863 [data missing]
John G. Montgomery (Danville)	Democratic	March 4, 1857 – April 24, 1857	35th	Elected in 1856. Died.	1853–1863 [data missing]
Vacant		April 24, 1857 – December 7, 1857	35th		1853–1863 [data missing]
Paul Leidy (Danville)	Democratic	December 7, 1857 – March 3, 1859	35th	Elected to finish Montgomery's term. [data missing]	1853–1863 [data missing]
George W. Scranton (Scranton)	Republican	March 4, 1859 – March 24, 1861	36th 37th	Elected in 1858. Re-elected in 1860. Died.	1853–1863 [data missing]
Vacant		March 24, 1861 – July 4, 1861	37th		1853–1863 [data missing]
Hendrick B. Wright (Wilkes-Barre)	Democratic	July 4, 1861 – March 3, 1863	37th	Elected to finish Scranton's term. [data missing]	1853–1863 [data missing]
Charles Denison (Wilkes-Barre)	Democratic	March 4, 1863 – June 27, 1867	38th 39th 40th	Elected in 1862. Re-elected in 1864. Re-elected in 1866. Died.	1863–1873 [data missing]
Vacant		June 27, 1867 – November 21, 1867	40th		1863–1873 [data missing]
George W. Woodward (Wilkes-Barre)	Democratic	November 21, 1867 – March 3, 1871	40th 41st	Elected to finish Denison's term. Re-elected in 1868. Retired.	1863–1873 [data missing]
Lazarus D. Shoemaker (Wilkes-Barre)	Republican	March 4, 1871 – March 3, 1875	42nd 43rd	Elected in 1870. Re-elected in 1872. Retired.	1863–1873 [data missing]
Lazarus D. Shoemaker (Wilkes-Barre)	Republican	March 4, 1871 – March 3, 1875	42nd 43rd	Elected in 1870. Re-elected in 1872. Retired.	1873–1883 [data missing]
Winthrop W. Ketcham (Wilkes-Barre)	Republican	March 4, 1875 – July 19, 1876	44th	Elected in 1874. Resigned to become U.S. District Judge	1873–1883 [data missing]
Vacant		July 19, 1876 – November 7, 1876	44th		1873–1883 [data missing]
William H. Stanton (Scranton)	Democratic	November 7, 1876 – March 3, 1877	44th	Elected to finish Ketcham's term. Retired.	1873–1883 [data missing]
Hendrick B. Wright (Wilkes-Barre)	Democratic	March 4, 1877 – March 3, 1879	45th 46th	Elected in 1876. Re-elected in 1878. Lost re-election.	1873–1883 [data missing]
Hendrick B. Wright (Wilkes-Barre)	Greenback	March 4, 1879 – March 3, 1881	45th 46th	Elected in 1876. Re-elected in 1878. Lost re-election.	1873–1883 [data missing]
Joseph A. Scranton (Scranton)	Republican	March 4, 1881 – March 3, 1883	47th	Elected in 1880. Lost re-election.	1873–1883 [data missing]
Daniel W. Connolly (Scranton)	Democratic	March 4, 1883 – March 3, 1885	48th	Elected in 1882. Lost re-election.	1883–1893 [data missing]
Joseph A. Scranton (Scranton)	Republican	March 4, 1885 – March 3, 1887	49th	Elected in 1884. Lost re-election.	1883–1893 [data missing]
John Lynch (Wilkes-Barre)	Democratic	March 4, 1887 – March 3, 1889	50th	Elected in 1886. Lost re-election.	1883–1893 [data missing]
Edwin S. Osborne (Wilkes-Barre)	Republican	March 4, 1889 – March 3, 1891	51st	Redistricted from the at-large district and re-elected in 1888. Retired.	1883–1893 [data missing]
George W. Shonk (Plymouth)	Republican	March 4, 1891 – March 3, 1893	52nd	Elected in 1890. Retired.	1883–1893 [data missing]
William H. Hines (Wilkes-Barre)	Democratic	March 4, 1893 – March 3, 1895	53rd	Elected in 1892. Lost re-election.	1893–1903 [data missing]
John Leisenring (Upper Lehigh)	Republican	March 4, 1895 – March 3, 1897	54th	Elected in 1894. Retired.	1893–1903 [data missing]
Morgan B. Williams (Wilkes-Barre)	Republican	March 4, 1897 – March 3, 1899	55th	Elected in 1896. Lost re-election.	1893–1903 [data missing]
Stanley W. Davenport (Plymouth)	Democratic	March 4, 1899 – March 3, 1901	56th	Elected in 1898. Lost renomination.	1893–1903 [data missing]
Henry W. Palmer (Wilkes-Barre)	Republican	March 4, 1901 – March 3, 1903	57th	Elected in 1900. Redistricted to the 11th district.	1893–1903 [data missing]
George R. Patterson (Ashland)	Republican	March 4, 1903 – March 21, 1906	58th 59th	Elected in 1902. Re-elected in 1904. Died.	1903–1913 [data missing]
Vacant		January 21, 1906 – November 6, 1906	59th		1903–1913 [data missing]
Charles N. Brumm (Minersville)	Republican	November 6, 1906 – January 4, 1909	59th 60th	Elected to finish Patterson's term. Re-elected in 1906. Retired to run for judge of the court of common pleas of Schuylkill County, Pennsylvania, and then resigned once elected.	1903–1913 [data missing]
Vacant		January 4, 1909 – March 3, 1909	60th		1903–1913 [data missing]
Alfred B. Garner (Ashland)	Republican	March 4, 1909 – March 3, 1911	61st	Elected in 1908. Lost renomination.	1903–1913 [data missing]
Robert E. Lee (Pottsville)	Democratic	March 4, 1911 – March 3, 1915	62nd 63rd	Elected in 1910. Re-elected in 1912. Lost re-election.	1903–1913 [data missing]
Robert E. Lee (Pottsville)	Democratic	March 4, 1911 – March 3, 1915	62nd 63rd	Elected in 1910. Re-elected in 1912. Lost re-election.	1913–1933 [data missing]
Robert D. Heaton (Ashland)	Republican	March 4, 1915 – March 3, 1919	64th 65th	Elected in 1914. Re-elected in 1916. Retired.	1913–1933 [data missing]
John Reber (Pottsville)	Republican	March 4, 1919 – March 3, 1923	66th 67th	Elected in 1918. Re-elected in 1920. Retired.	1913–1933 [data missing]
John J. Casey (Wilkes-Barre)	Democratic	March 4, 1923 – March 3, 1925	68th	Elected in 1922. Lost re-election.	1913–1933 [data missing]
Edmund N. Carpenter (Wilkes-Barre)	Republican	March 4, 1925 – March 3, 1927	69th	Elected in 1924. Lost re-election.	1913–1933 [data missing]
John J. Casey (Wilkes-Barre)	Democratic	March 4, 1927 – May 5, 1929	70th 71st	Elected in 1926. Re-elected in 1928. Died.	1913–1933 [data missing]
Vacant		May 5, 1929 – June 4, 1929	71st		1913–1933 [data missing]
C. Murray Turpin (Kingston)	Republican	June 4, 1929 – January 3, 1937	71st 72nd 73rd 74th	Elected to finish Casey's term. Re-elected in 1930. Re-elected in 1932. Re-elected in 1934. Lost re-election.	1913–1933 [data missing]
C. Murray Turpin (Kingston)	Republican	June 4, 1929 – January 3, 1937	71st 72nd 73rd 74th	Elected to finish Casey's term. Re-elected in 1930. Re-elected in 1932. Re-elected in 1934. Lost re-election.	1933–1943 [data missing]
J. Harold Flannery (Pittston)	Democratic	January 3, 1937 – January 3, 1942	75th 76th 77th	Elected in 1936. Re-elected in 1938. Re-elected in 1940. Resigned to become judge of the common pleas court of Luzerne County, Pennsylvania.	1933–1943 [data missing]
Vacant		January 3, 1942 – May 19, 1942	77th		1933–1943 [data missing]
Thomas B. Miller (Plymouth)	Republican	May 19, 1942 – January 3, 1945	77th 78th	Elected to finish Flannery's term. Re-elected later in 1942. Lost re-election.	1933–1943 [data missing]
Thomas B. Miller (Plymouth)	Republican	May 19, 1942 – January 3, 1945	77th 78th	Elected to finish Flannery's term. Re-elected later in 1942. Lost re-election.	1943–1953 [data missing]
Ivor D. Fenton (Mahanoy City)	Republican	January 3, 1945 – January 3, 1963	79th 80th 81st 82nd 83rd 84th 85th 86th 87th	Redistricted from the 13th district and re-elected in 1944. Re-elected in 1946. Re-elected in 1948. Re-elected in 1950. Re-elected in 1952. Re-elected in 1954. Re-elected in 1956. Re-elected in 1958. Re-elected in 1960. Redistricted to the 6th district and lost re-election.	1943–1953 [data missing]
Ivor D. Fenton (Mahanoy City)	Republican	January 3, 1945 – January 3, 1963	79th 80th 81st 82nd 83rd 84th 85th 86th 87th	Redistricted from the 13th district and re-elected in 1944. Re-elected in 1946. Re-elected in 1948. Re-elected in 1950. Re-elected in 1952. Re-elected in 1954. Re-elected in 1956. Re-elected in 1958. Re-elected in 1960. Redistricted to the 6th district and lost re-election.	1953–1963 [data missing]
J. Irving Whalley (Windber)	Republican	January 3, 1963 – January 3, 1973	88th 89th 90th 91st 92nd	Redistricted from the 18th district and re-elected in 1962. Re-elected in 1964. Re-elected in 1966. Re-elected in 1968. Re-elected in 1970. Retired.	1963–1973 [data missing]
John P. Saylor (Johnstown)	Republican	January 3, 1973 – October 28, 1973	93rd	Redistricted from the 22nd district and re-elected in 1972. Died.	1973–1983 [data missing]
Vacant		October 28, 1973 – February 5, 1974	93rd		1973–1983 [data missing]
John Murtha (Johnstown)	Democratic	February 5, 1974 – February 8, 2010	93rd 94th 95th 96th 97th 98th 99th 100th 101st 102nd 103rd 104th 105th 106th 107th 108th 109th 110th 111th	Elected to finish Saylor's term. Re-elected later in 1974. Re-elected in 1976. Re-elected in 1978. Re-elected in 1980. Re-elected in 1982. Re-elected in 1984. Re-elected in 1986. Re-elected in 1988. Re-elected in 1990. Re-elected in 1992. Re-elected in 1994. Re-elected in 1996. Re-elected in 1998. Re-elected in 2000. Re-elected in 2002. Re-elected in 2004. Re-elected in 2006. Re-elected in 2008. Died.	1973–1983 [data missing]
John Murtha (Johnstown)	Democratic	February 5, 1974 – February 8, 2010	93rd 94th 95th 96th 97th 98th 99th 100th 101st 102nd 103rd 104th 105th 106th 107th 108th 109th 110th 111th	Elected to finish Saylor's term. Re-elected later in 1974. Re-elected in 1976. Re-elected in 1978. Re-elected in 1980. Re-elected in 1982. Re-elected in 1984. Re-elected in 1986. Re-elected in 1988. Re-elected in 1990. Re-elected in 1992. Re-elected in 1994. Re-elected in 1996. Re-elected in 1998. Re-elected in 2000. Re-elected in 2002. Re-elected in 2004. Re-elected in 2006. Re-elected in 2008. Died.	1983–1993 [data missing]
John Murtha (Johnstown)	Democratic	February 5, 1974 – February 8, 2010	93rd 94th 95th 96th 97th 98th 99th 100th 101st 102nd 103rd 104th 105th 106th 107th 108th 109th 110th 111th	Elected to finish Saylor's term. Re-elected later in 1974. Re-elected in 1976. Re-elected in 1978. Re-elected in 1980. Re-elected in 1982. Re-elected in 1984. Re-elected in 1986. Re-elected in 1988. Re-elected in 1990. Re-elected in 1992. Re-elected in 1994. Re-elected in 1996. Re-elected in 1998. Re-elected in 2000. Re-elected in 2002. Re-elected in 2004. Re-elected in 2006. Re-elected in 2008. Died.	1993–2003 [data missing]
John Murtha (Johnstown)	Democratic	February 5, 1974 – February 8, 2010	93rd 94th 95th 96th 97th 98th 99th 100th 101st 102nd 103rd 104th 105th 106th 107th 108th 109th 110th 111th	Elected to finish Saylor's term. Re-elected later in 1974. Re-elected in 1976. Re-elected in 1978. Re-elected in 1980. Re-elected in 1982. Re-elected in 1984. Re-elected in 1986. Re-elected in 1988. Re-elected in 1990. Re-elected in 1992. Re-elected in 1994. Re-elected in 1996. Re-elected in 1998. Re-elected in 2000. Re-elected in 2002. Re-elected in 2004. Re-elected in 2006. Re-elected in 2008. Died.	2003–2013
Vacant		February 8, 2010 – May 18, 2010	111th		2003–2013
Mark Critz (Johnstown)	Democratic	May 18, 2010 – January 3, 2013	111th 112th	Elected to finish Murtha's term. Re-elected later in 2010. Lost re-election.	2003–2013
Keith Rothfus (Sewickley)	Republican	January 3, 2013 – January 3, 2019	113th 114th 115th	Elected in 2012. Re-elected in 2014. Re-elected in 2016. Redistricted to the 17th district and lost re-election.	2013–2019
Tom Marino (Cogan Station)	Republican	January 3, 2019 – January 23, 2019	116th	Redistricted from the 10th district and re-elected in 2018. Resigned.	2019–2023
Vacant		January 23, 2019 – May 21, 2019	116th		2019–2023
Fred Keller (Middleburg)	Republican	May 21, 2019 – January 3, 2023	116th 117th	Elected to finish Marino's term. Re-elected in 2020. Redistricted to the 9th district and retired at the end of term.	2019–2023
Summer Lee (Swissvale)	Democratic	January 3, 2023 – present	118th 119th	Elected in 2022. Re-elected in 2024. Re-elected in 2026.	2023–

== Recent election results ==
=== 2012 ===
Pennsylvania's 12th congressional district, 2012
Party	Candidate	Votes	%
Republican	Keith Rothfus	175,352	51.7
Democratic	Mark Critz (incumbent)	163,589	48.3
Total votes		338,941	100.0
Republican gain from Democratic			

=== 2014 ===
Pennsylvania's 12th congressional district, 2014
Party	Candidate	Votes	%
Republican	Keith Rothfus (incumbent)	127,993	59.3
Democratic	Erin McClelland	87,928	40.7
Total votes		215,921	100.0
Republican hold			

=== 2016 ===
Pennsylvania's 12th congressional district, 2016
Party	Candidate	Votes	%
Republican	Keith Rothfus (incumbent)	221,851	61.8
Democratic	Erin Mcclelland	137,353	38.2
Total votes		359,204	100.0
Republican hold			

=== 2018 ===
Pennsylvania's 12th congressional district, 2018
Party	Candidate	Votes	%
Republican	Tom Marino (incumbent)	161,047	66.0
Democratic	Marc Friedenberg	82,825	34.0
Total votes		243,872	100.0
Republican hold			

=== 2019 special election ===
Pennsylvania's 12th congressional district special election, 2019
Party	Candidate	Votes	%	±%
Republican	Fred Keller	90,000	68.08%	+2.04%
Democratic	Marc Friedenberg	42,195	31.92%	−2.04%
Total votes		132,195	100.0%	N/A
Republican hold				

=== 2020 ===
Pennsylvania's 12th congressional district, 2020
Party	Candidate	Votes	%
Republican	Fred Keller (incumbent)	241,035	70.8
Democratic	Lee Griffin	99,199	29.2
Total votes		340,234	100.0
Republican hold			

=== 2022 ===
Pennsylvania's 12th congressional district, 2022
Party	Candidate	Votes	%
Democratic	Summer Lee	184,674	56.2
Republican	Mike Doyle	143,946	43.8
Total votes		328,620	100.0
Democratic hold			

=== 2024 ===
Pennsylvania's 12th congressional district, 2024
Party	Candidate	Votes	%
Democratic	Summer Lee (incumbent)	234,802	56.4
Republican	James Hayes	181,426	43.6
Total votes		416,228	100.0
Democratic hold			

== See also ==
- List of United States congressional districts
- Pennsylvania's congressional districts
