= Charles Denison =

American politician

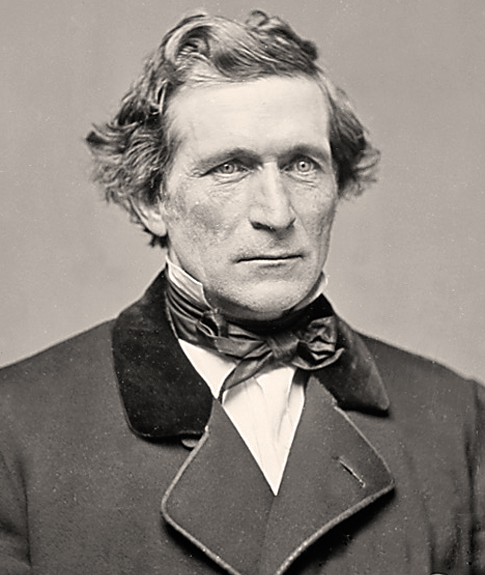

Member of the U.S. House of Representatives from Pennsylvania's 12th district
- In office March 4, 1863 – June 27, 1867
- Preceded by: Hendrick B. Wright
- Succeeded by: George W. Woodward

Personal details
- Born: January 23, 1818 Wyoming Valley, Pennsylvania
- Died: June 27, 1867 (aged 49) Wilkes-Barre, Pennsylvania
- Party: Democratic
- Relatives: George Denison (uncle)

Charles Denison (January 23, 1818 – June 27, 1867) was a Democratic member of the U.S. House of Representatives from Pennsylvania.

Charles Denison (nephew of George Denison) was born in Wyoming Valley, Pennsylvania. He received a liberal education, and was graduated from Dickinson College in Carlisle, Pennsylvania, in 1838. He studied law, was admitted to the bar in 1840 and commenced practice in Wilkes-Barre, Pennsylvania.

Denison was elected as a Democrat to the Thirty-eighth, Thirty-ninth, and Fortieth Congresses and served until his death in Wilkes-Barre. He was a delegate to the 1864 Democratic National Convention. He was buried in the Forty Fort Cemetery in Forty Fort, Pennsylvania.

Denison supported states' rights and opposed what he perceived as usage of the Civil War to impose the will of the federal government on the southern states. He voted against the Thirteenth Amendment banning slavery. Denison denounced abolitionism as "wicked and cruel fanaticism" and labeled the administration of President Abraham Lincoln as "despotic."

== See also ==
- List of members of the United States Congress who died in office (1790–1899)

U.S. House of Representatives
Preceded by Hendrick B. Wright	Member of the U.S. House of Representatives from Pennsylvania's 12th congressional district 1863–1867	Succeeded by George W. Woodward
