= Christian M. Straub =

American politician

Christian Markle Straub (1804 – June 7, 1860) was an American politician from Pennsylvania who served as a Democratic member of the U.S. House of Representatives for Pennsylvania's 11th congressional district from 1853 to 1855.

== Early life and education ==
Straub was born in Milton, Pennsylvania to Andrew II and Mary Eveline Walter. He studied law and was admitted to the bar. He served as prothonotary of Schuylkill County, Pennsylvania in 1845 and sheriff of Schuylkill County in 1849.

== Career ==
Straub was elected as a Democrat to the Thirty-third Congress. He was a member of the Pennsylvania State Senate for the 28th district from 1855 to 1856 and the 7th district from 1857 to 1858.

== Sources ==
- United States Congress. "Christian M. Straub (id: S000999)". Biographical Directory of the United States Congress.
- The Political Graveyard

U.S. House of Representatives
Preceded by Henry M. Fuller	Member of the U.S. House of Representatives from Pennsylvania's 11th congressional district 1853–1855	Succeeded by James H. Campbell
Pennsylvania State Senate
Preceded by	Member of the Pennsylvania Senate, 28th district 1855-1856	Succeeded by
Preceded by	Member of the Pennsylvania Senate, 7th district 1857-1858	Succeeded by
