= Charles Calvin Bowman =

American politician (1852–1941)

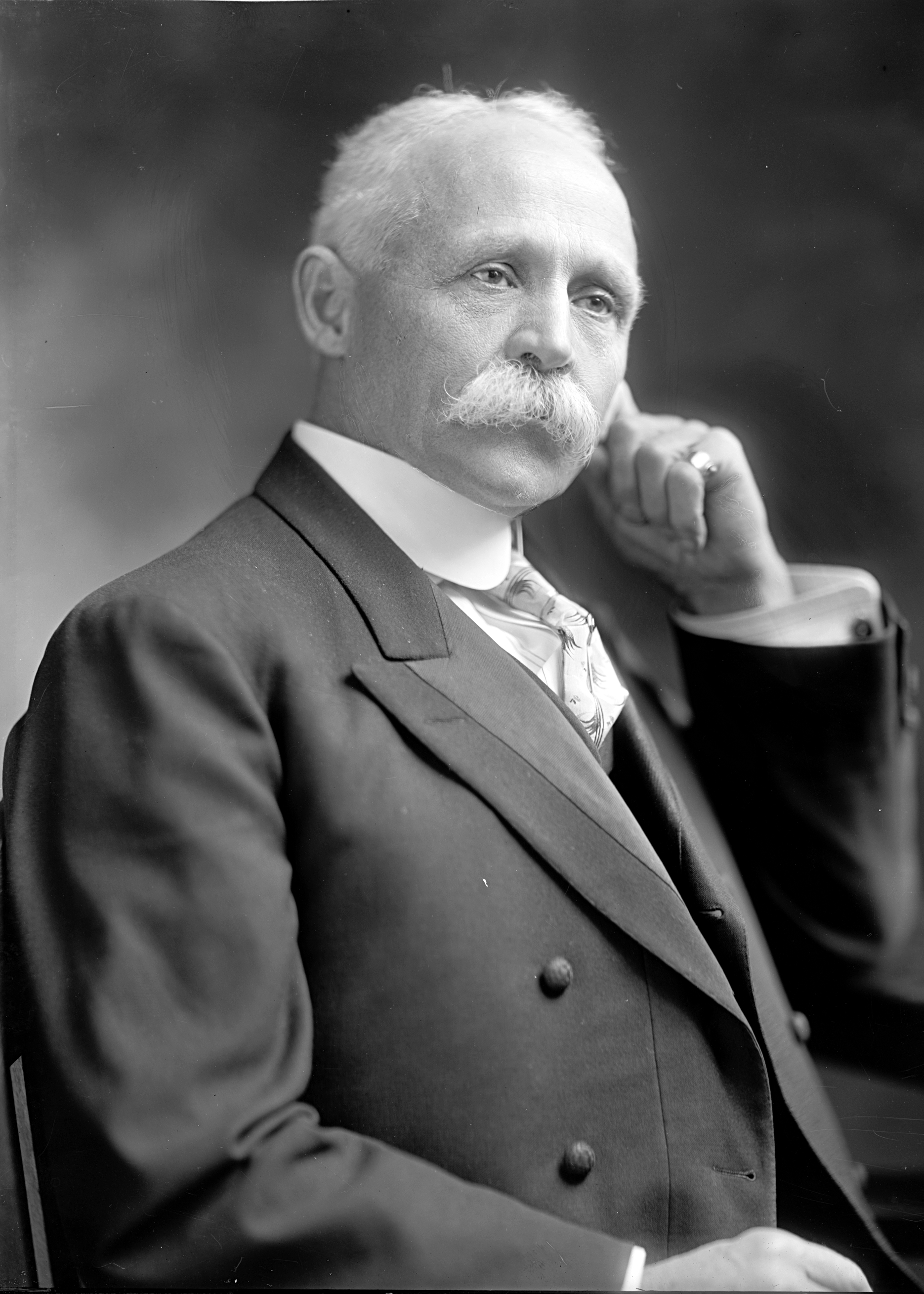

Member of the U.S. House of Representatives from Pennsylvania's 11th district
- In office March 4, 1911 – December 12, 1912
- Preceded by: Henry Wilbur Palmer
- Succeeded by: John J. Casey

Personal details
- Born: November 14, 1852 Troy, New York
- Died: July 3, 1941 (aged 88)
- Party: Republican

Charles Calvin Bowman (November 14, 1852 – July 3, 1941) was a Republican member of the U.S. House of Representatives from Pennsylvania.

Charles Calvin Bowman was born in Troy, New York. He attended Lansingburgh Academy in Troy, and learned the woodworking trade.

He graduated in civil engineering from Union College in Schenectady, New York, in 1875. He was engaged in civil engineering work for the State of Massachusetts at Danvers, Massachusetts, in 1875.

He organized the western shipping department of the Pennsylvania Coal Company of Pittston, Pennsylvania, in 1876, which he managed the company until 1883. He served as general manager of the Florence Coal Co., in 1883 and 1884, later operating as an independent miner and shipper of anthracite coal. He served as mayor of Pittston in 1896, and served as a member of the city council for sixteen terms. He was a delegate to the Independent Republican State convention in 1890 and to the Republican State convention in 1898.

Bowman presented credentials as a Republican Member-elect to the Sixty-second Congress, but his election was contested by his opponent George B. McLean. McLean argued that Bowman reported only $7,000 in campaign expenditures but actually spent more than $9,000. The House Committee on Elections found that this was not an error, but active fraud as evidenced by "erasures on check stubs and alteration of memoranda". As a result, the House declared that Bowman had not been elected. Bowman served from March 4, 1911 until December 12, 1912, when the seat was declared vacant. He was an unsuccessful candidate for election in 1912. He resumed the coal business, and died in Pittston in 1941 at the age of 88. He was interred in Pittston Cemetery.

== Sources ==
- United States Congress. "Charles Calvin Bowman (id: B000703)". Biographical Directory of the United States Congress.
- The Political Graveyard

U.S. House of Representatives
Preceded by Henry Wilbur Palmer	Member of the U.S. House of Representatives from Pennsylvania's 11th congressional district 1911–1912	Succeeded by John J. Casey
