= National Hotel (Washington, D.C.) =

Historic hotel in Washington, D.C.

Coordinates: 38°53′34.8″N 77°1′10.6″W

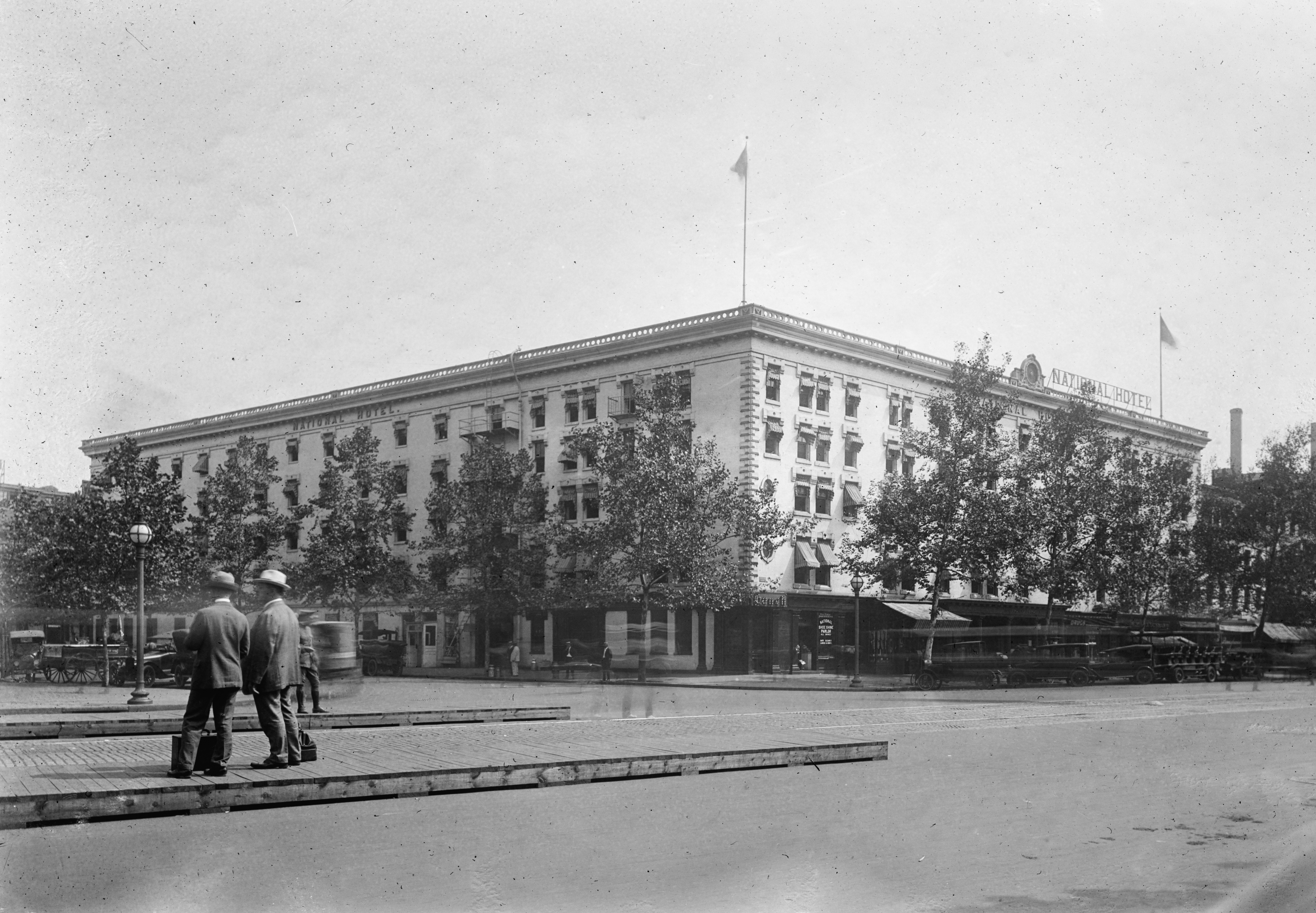
National Hotel, sometime between 1909 and 1920

The National Hotel was a hotel in Washington, D.C. It was located on the northeastern corner of the intersection of Pennsylvania Avenue and 6th Street NW. John Gadsby had it built in 1826. The hotel was sold to the city in 1929, and it was demolished in 1942.

The hotel was the site from which Solomon Northup was taken in 1841 after he was incapacitated beginning his Twelve Years a Slave.

In 1857, there was an outbreak of a mysterious illness at the hotel.

During the Civil War, Confederate sympathizers met there.

There were many notable people who resided at the National during their years in Washington. Two prominent politicians who lived here were Thomas W. Ferry and Henry Clay (who died at the National).

John Wilkes Booth had been staying at the National Hotel, in Room 228, the night that he assassinated Abraham Lincoln.
