= Stanley W. Davenport =

American politician (1861–1921)

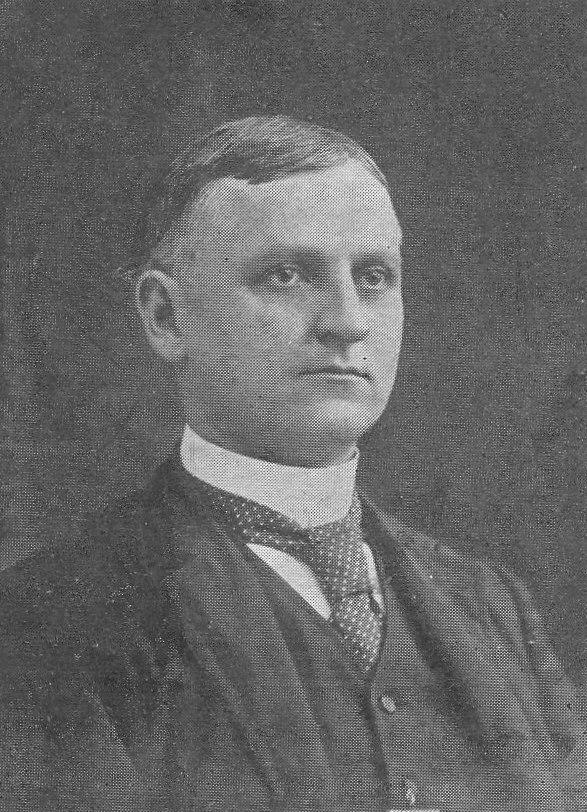

Member of the U.S. House of Representatives from Pennsylvania's 12th district
- In office March 4, 1899 – March 3, 1901
- Preceded by: Morgan B. Williams
- Succeeded by: Henry Wilbur Palmer

Personal details
- Born: July 21, 1861 Plymouth, Pennsylvania
- Died: September 26, 1921 (aged 60) Plymouth, Pennsylvania
- Party: Democratic
- Spouse: Mary Weir
- Children: Two
- Education: Wesleyan University

Stanley Woodward Davenport (July 21, 1861 – September 26, 1921) was an American politician from Pennsylvania who served as a Democratic member of the U.S. House of Representatives for Pennsylvania's 12th congressional district from 1899 to 1901.

== Biography ==
Stanley W. Davenport was born in Plymouth, Pennsylvania, the son of Edwin Davenport and his wife, Mary McAlarney. Davenport was educated in the public schools of Plymouth, attended Wyoming Seminary and graduated in 1884 from Wesleyan University, Middletown, Connecticut, earning a Bachelor of Arts.

After completing college, Davenport was associated in business for two years with his brother, Andrew L. Davenport, who owned a book store on Main Street in Plymouth, after which he studied law under the tutelage of the Honorable George Washington Shonk, a cousin. In 1890, Davenport was admitted to the Luzerne County Bar, and in 1891 he commenced the practice of law.

In 1884, Davenport was elected Register of Wills of Luzerne County, Pennsylvania, the only victorious Democrat on the ballot. In 1893, he was appointed a Director of the Poor for the central district of Luzerne County, serving for twenty-eight years as secretary and treasurer of the Central Poor Board. He served as the Register of Wills of Luzerne County again from 1894 to 1897.

In 1898, Davenport was nominated by the Democratic party for Congress and was elected to the 56th United States Congress, serving from March 4, 1899 to March 3, 1901, but was an unsuccessful candidate for re-nomination in 1900. Following this loss, Davenport resumed the practice of law in Plymouth until his death in 1921 at age 60 following a prolonged illness. He was buried in the Shawnee Cemetery, Plymouth, Pennsylvania.

Davenport married Mary Weir on June 13, 1889, with whom he had two daughters: Marian Livingston Davenport, born May 1, 1890 (later Mrs. Bryce Wadhams Blair, of Charlestown, West Virginia); and Mary Isabel Davenport, born in February 1894 (later Mrs. James Edward James, of Bethlehem, Pennsylvania).

== Sources ==
Birth & Death Certificates, Burial Deed, Marriage Certificates, Newspaper articles

- United States Congress. "Stanley W. Davenport (id: D000078)". Biographical Directory of the United States Congress.
- The Political Graveyard

U.S. House of Representatives
Preceded by Morgan B. Williams	Member of the U.S. House of Representatives from Pennsylvania's 12th congressional district 1899–1901	Succeeded by Henry Wilbur Palmer
