= Pwllpriddog Oak =

Historic tree in Carmarthenshire, Wales

Coordinates: 52°04′31.9″N 03°47′13.7″W

The Pwllpriddog Oak (Welsh: Derwen Pwllpriddog), also known as the Rhandirmwyn Oak, is a 600–700-year-old tree located in farmland near Rhandirmwyn in Carmarthenshire, Wales. Recently it has served as a duck roost and a music venue. In 2018 the tree was named Welsh Tree of the Year in a public vote.

== Description ==
External image
- Photograph of the Pwllpriddog Oak

The Pwllpriddog Oak is known in Welsh as Derwen Pwllpriddog, and an alternative English name is the Rhandirmwyn Oak. It is sited in a farm hedgerow by a country lane outside of Rhandirmwyn in Carmarthenshire, Wales. The tree is described as a giant, being some 8.4 metres (28 ft) in girth, and is completely hollow. The pub in Rhandirmwyn is named the "Royal Oak": there is possibly a connection to a local legend about the tree serving as a hiding place for a king. The hollow inside the tree has been used by farmers in the past as a pig sty – the current farmer uses its branches as a roost and nesting place for ducks. Bands and choirs have used the tree as a performance venue, and it is thought to be the only tree in Wales to have had live music performed inside of it.

== Tree of the year ==
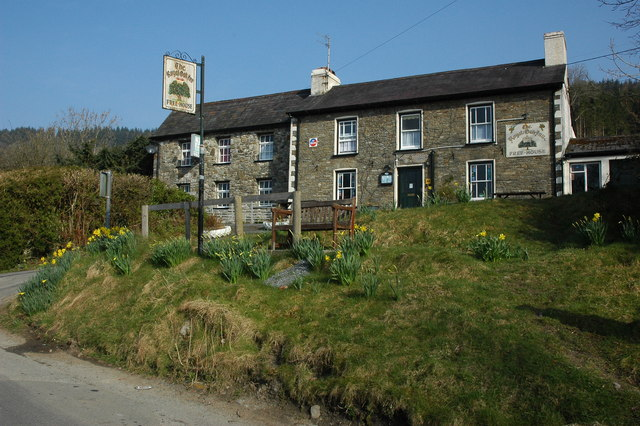
The Royal Oak pub is named in honour of the tree.

The Pwllpriddog Oak was entered into the Woodland Trust's Welsh Tree of the Year competition in 2014 under the name of the Rhandirmwyn Oak. It came in third place with 20% of the public vote – the competition was won that year by the Lonely Tree in Llanfyllin, Powys. The oak was re-entered into the competition in 2018 which it won, receiving a £1000 grant for tree care from the People's Postcode Lottery. A subsequent public vote was held in October 2018, in conjunction with the BBC's The One Show, to select an overall British tree of the year from the four national finalists. The winner for 2018 was England's Nellie's Tree.
