= John Leisenring =

American politician (1853–1901)

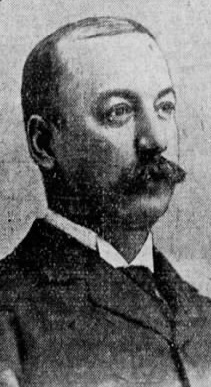
- From The Times Philadelphia, PA), January 21, 1901

Member of the U.S. House of Representatives from Pennsylvania's 12th district
- In office March 4, 1895 – March 3, 1897
- Preceded by: William H. Hines
- Succeeded by: Morgan B. Williams

Member of the Pennsylvania House of Representatives
- In office 1894-1895

Personal details
- Born: June 3, 1853 Ashton, Pennsylvania, U.S.
- Died: January 19, 1901 (aged 47) Philadelphia, Pennsylvania, U.S.
- Party: Republican

John Leisenring (June 3, 1853 – January 19, 1901) was an American politician from Pennsylvania who served as a Republican member of the U.S. House of Representatives for Pennsylvania's 12th congressional district from 1895 to 1897.

== Formative years ==
John Leisenring was born in Ashton, Pennsylvania, now known as Lansford, Carbon County, Pennsylvania. He attended two public schools, Schwartz’s Academy in Bethlehem, Pennsylvania, and an academy in Merchantville and Princeton, New Jersey. He became a civil and mining engineer and was identified with banking, coal, iron, and lumber industries. He moved from Mauch Chunk, Pennsylvania to Upper Lehigh, Pennsylvania, in 1885.

== Political career ==
A Republican, Leisenring was a member of the Pennsylvania State House of Representatives in 1894 and 1895, and was then elected to the Fifty-fourth Congress. He declined to be a candidate for reelection in 1896. He was a delegate to the Republican State convention in 1896. He resumed his former business pursuits and served as president of the Upper Lehigh Coal Company.

== Death and interment ==
Leisenring died in Philadelphia in 1901, and was interred in the City Cemetery in present-day Jim Thorpe, Pennsylvania. He was 47 at the time of his death.

== Sources ==
- United States Congress. "John Leisenring (id: L000235)". Biographical Directory of the United States Congress.
- The Political Graveyard

U.S. House of Representatives
Preceded by William Henry Hines	Member of the U.S. House of Representatives from Pennsylvania's 12th congressional district 1895–1897	Succeeded by Morgan B. Williams
