= William Henry Hines =

American politician (1856–1914)

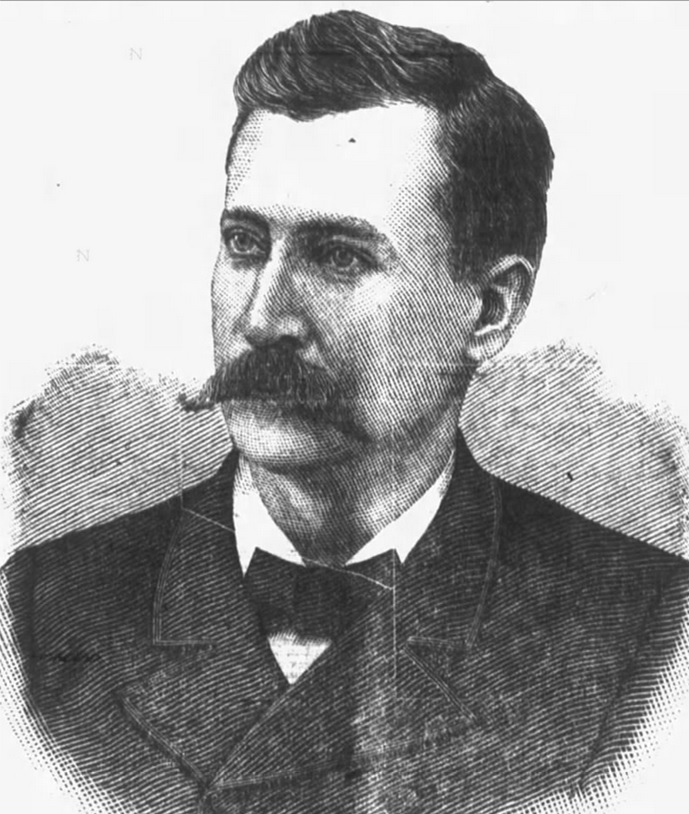

Member of the U.S. House of Representatives from Pennsylvania's 12th district
- In office March 4, 1893 – March 3, 1895
- Preceded by: George Washington Shonk
- Succeeded by: John Leisenring

Member of the Pennsylvania Senate for the 21st district
- In office 1888-1892
- Preceded by: Morgan B. Williams
- Succeeded by: Clarence W. Kline

Member of the Pennsylvania House of Representatives
- In office 1879-1880; 1883-1884

Personal details
- Born: March 15, 1856 Brooklyn, New York, US
- Died: January 17, 1914 (aged 57) Wilkes-Barre, Pennsylvania, US
- Party: Democratic; National Greenback

William Henry Hines (March 15, 1856 – January 17, 1914) was an American politician who served as a Democratic member of the U.S. House of Representatives for Pennsylvania's 12th congressional district from 1893 to 1895.

== Early life and education ==
William Henry Hines was born in Brooklyn, New York. He moved to Pennsylvania in 1865 with his parents, who settled in Hanover Township, Pennsylvania. He attended the public schools in Brooklyn and Wyoming Seminary in Kingston, Pennsylvania. He studied law and was admitted to the bar in Luzerne County, Pennsylvania, in 1881.

== Career ==
Hines was appointed town clerk of Hanover Township, Pennsylvania, in 1876 and elected assessor in 1877.

He served as a National Greenback member of the Pennsylvania State House of Representatives for Lackawanna and Luzerne County from 1879 to 1880 and as a Democratic member from 1883 to 1884. He served as a member of the Pennsylvania State Senate for the 21st district from 1888 to 1892. Hines was elected as a Democrat to the Fifty-third Congress. He was an unsuccessful candidate for re-election in 1894.

He worked as president of the Pocono Water Company and had unsuccessful campaigns for judge in the Pennsylvania Court of Common Pleas for Luzerne County in 1911 and 1913.

He resumed the practice of law in Wilkes-Barre and died there in 1914.

== Sources ==
- United States Congress. "William Henry Hines (id: H000635)". Biographical Directory of the United States Congress.
- The Political Graveyard

Pennsylvania House of Representatives
Preceded by	Member of the Pennsylvania House of Representatives; 1879-1880, 1883-1884	Succeeded by
Pennsylvania State Senate
Preceded by Morgan B. Williams	Member of the Pennsylvania Senate, 21st district 1888-1892	Succeeded by Clarence W. Kline
U.S. House of Representatives
Preceded by George W. Shonk	Member of the U.S. House of Representatives from Pennsylvania's 12th congressional district 1893–1895	Succeeded by John Leisenring
