= Morgan B. Williams =

American politician (1831–1903)

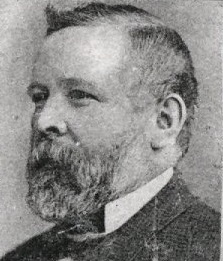

Member of the U.S. House of Representatives from Pennsylvania's 12th district
- In office March 4, 1897 – March 3, 1899
- Preceded by: John Leisenring
- Succeeded by: Stanley W. Davenport

Member of the Pennsylvania Senate for the 21st district
- In office 1885–1888
- Preceded by: Eckley Brinton Coxe
- Succeeded by: William Henry Hines

Personal details
- Born: September 17, 1831 Rhandir-Mwyn, Carmarthenshire, Wales
- Died: October 13, 1903 (aged 72) Wilkes-Barre, Pennsylvania, U.S.
- Party: Republican

Morgan B. Williams (September 17, 1831 – October 13, 1903) was a coal industry executive and politician who served as a Republican member of the U.S. House of Representatives for Pennsylvania's 12th congressional district from 1897 to 1899.

Williams was born in Rhandir-Mwyn, Carmarthenshire, Wales. He attended the public schools and assisted his father in the operation of a lead mine. When Williams was 16, his father died, and he took control of the lead mining operation. He moved to Australia in 1856 and began gold mining. He returned to Wales in August 1861.

He emigrated to the United States in March 1862. He first lived in Hyde Park, Pennsylvania and worked in the coal mines until 1865 when he moved to Wilkes-Barre, Pennsylvania. He was appointed superintendent for the Lehigh & Wilkes-Barre Coal Co., and held that position for fourteen years. In 1878, Williams, along with George and Fred Parrish, founded the Red Ash Coal Company. He was head of the Williams Coal Co. in Pottsville, Pennsylvania, worked as president of the Grenville Graphite Company in Canada, vice-president of the Wilkes-Barre Deposit and Savings Bank, as a director of the Spring Brook Water Supply Company and had financial interests in Vulcan Iron Works.

He was a member of the Wilkes-Barre school board and the city council for twelve years. He served as a member of the Pennsylvania State Senate for the 21st district from 1885 to 1888. He was a member of the Chicago World’s Fair Commission in 1893.

Williams was elected as a Republican to the Fifty-fifth Congress. He was an unsuccessful candidate for reelection in 1898. He remained engaged in coal mining and died in Wilkes-Barre in 1903, aged 72.

Pennsylvania State Senate
Preceded by Eckley Brinton Coxe	Member of the Pennsylvania Senate, 21st district 1885–1888	Succeeded by William Henry Hines
U.S. House of Representatives
Preceded by John Leisenring	Member of the U.S. House of Representatives from Pennsylvania's 12th congressional district 1897–1899	Succeeded by Stanley W. Davenport
