= Shawnee Cemetery, Plymouth, Pennsylvania =

Shawnee Cemetery
- Interactive map of Shawnee Cemetery

Details
- Established: 1873
- Country: United States
- Coordinates: 41.24190°N 75.96140°W
- No. of interments: 15,000
- Find a Grave: Shawnee Cemetery

Shawnee Cemetery in Plymouth, Pennsylvania, located on 13.5 acres on a hillside overlooking Wyoming Valley, was established by the Shawnee Cemetery Association, and chartered on September 5, 1873. Interments began in the fall of 1873, many of which were initially reinterments from other older cemeteries.

At an initial meeting of the directors of the association, chaired by Draper Smith, deeds for the cemetery grounds were paid for and accepted from John B. Smith, and Ira and Oliver Davenport, and a committee was appointed to install a fence around the grounds.

In 1994, following decades of neglect, Plymouth's General Federation of Women's Clubs, led by Janice Williams, undertook the task of restoring the once beautiful cemetery. They constructed a new shed to house maintenance equipment, painted iron fences, repaired headstones, removed trees, repaired roads, and installed new street signs.

In 2008, the Shawnee Cemetery Preservation Association took over the work of maintaining the grounds. Led for fifteen years by president Tom Jesso Sr. (1951-2024), the group has installed benches, made roadway repairs, removed brush, and repaired headstones. The Association's efforts to reclaim several hundred graves from the overgrowth in the outermost sections have facilitated the compilation of historical data, and revealed the borders of the cemetery.

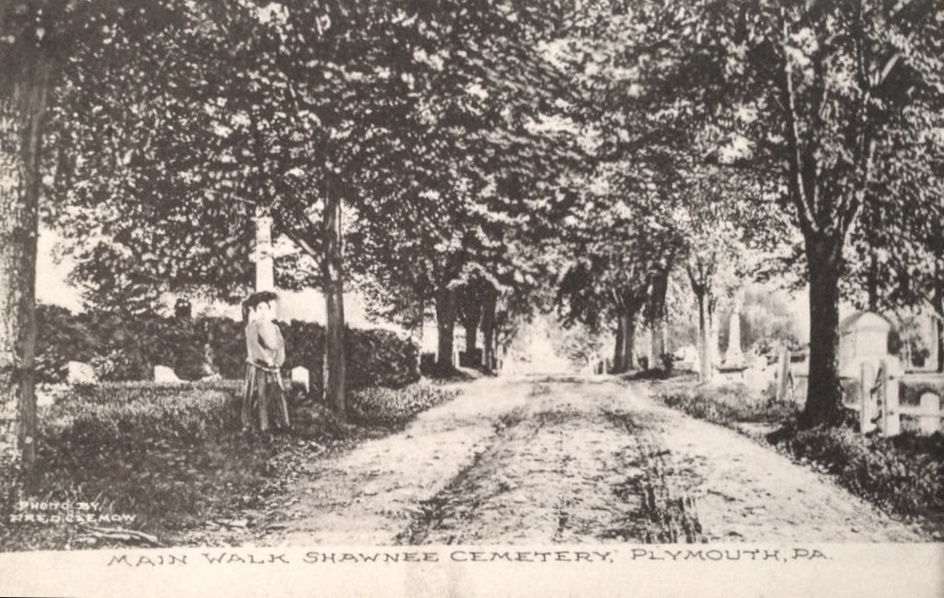
A view of the Shawnee Cemetery taken about 1908 by the photographer Fred Clemow (1872-1957).

== Notable interments ==
- Abram Nesbitt (died January 2, 1847), a veteran of the Revolutionary War.
- George Palmer Ransom (died September 5, 1850), a veteran of the Revolutionary War.
- Captain John Dennis (died in 1887), was elected Plymouth's 10th Burgess in 1881.
- Ira Davenport (died February 3rd, 1893), Early settler and pioneer of the valley. Was also appointed postmaster of Plymouth by President Jackson and reappointed by President Van Buren. Councilman, elected treasurer.
- Peter C. Roberts (died in 1894), appointed Plymouth's 13th Burgess in 1890.
- Daniel B. Loderick (died in 1898), was elected Plymouth's 14th Burgess, serving from 1893 to 1897.
- George Washington Shonk (died August 14, 1900), member of the U.S. House of Representatives.
- John Jenks Shonk (died May 1, 1904), coal operator, served in the Pennsylvania State Legislature from 1875 to 1878.
- John B. Smith (died July 19, 1904), proprietor Smith's Opera House, coal operator, served in the Pennsylvania State Legislature from 1877 to 1880.
- Alfred J. Martin (died in 1913), was elected Plymouth's 12th Burgess in 1889.
- Philip Walters (died in 1916), served as Plymouth's 15th Burgess from 1897 to 1900.
- Elijah Cox (died in 1918), was elected Plymouth's 16th Burgess in 1900.
- David D. Morris (died in 1919), was elected Plymouth's 19th Burgess in 1909.
- Stanley Woodward Davenport (died September 26, 1921), member of the U.S. House of Representatives.
- Morgan Bevan (died September 6, 1924), served as Plymouth's 18th Burgess from 1906 to 1909.
- Samuel U. Shaffer (died in 1929), a Civil War veteran, and Plymouth's 20th Burgess from 1914 to 1918.

== Gallery ==
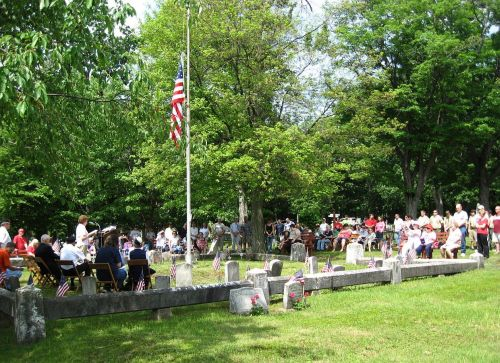
Shawnee Cemetery, Memorial Day 2011.

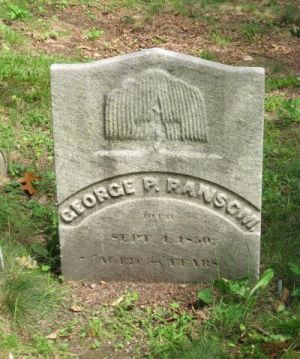
Tombstone of George Palmer Ransom, a veteran of the Revolutionary War.

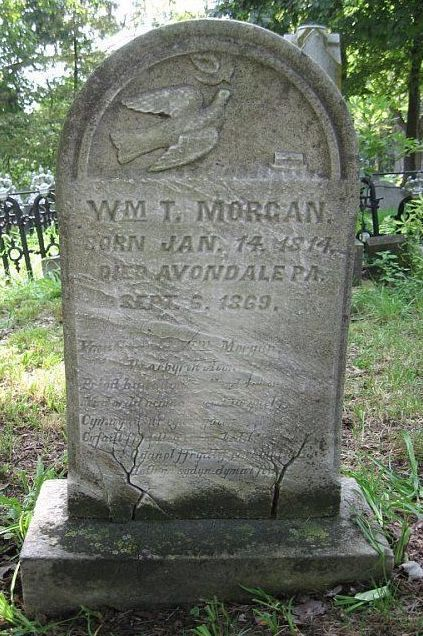
Tombstone of William Morgan, who died in the Avondale Mine Disaster of 1869.

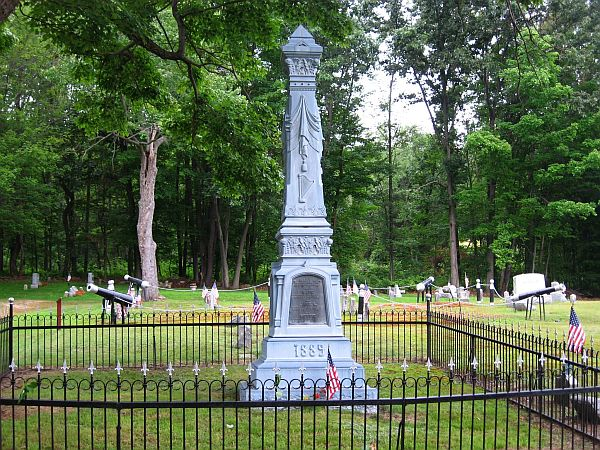
Monument to the victims of the Squib Factory Explosion of 1899.

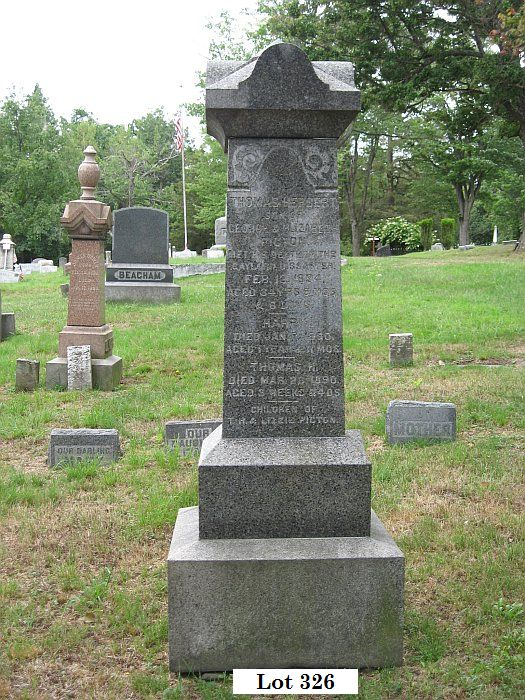
Tombstone of Thomas Picton, who died in the Gaylord Mine Disaster of 1894.

== See also ==
- Plymouth, Pennsylvania
- History of Plymouth, Pennsylvania
- Coal Mining in Plymouth, Pennsylvania
- Architecture of Plymouth, Pennsylvania
