= History of Plymouth, Pennsylvania =

Plymouth, Pennsylvania, sits on the west side of Pennsylvania's Wyoming Valley, wedged between the Susquehanna River and the Shawnee Mountain range. Just below the mountain are hills that surround the town and form a natural amphitheater that separates the town from the rest of the valley. Below the hills, the flat lands are formed in the shape of a frying pan, the pan being the Shawnee flats, once the center of the town's agricultural activities, and the handle being a spit of narrow land extending east from the flats, where the center of town is located. At the beginning of the 19th century, Plymouth's primary industry was agriculture. However, vast anthracite coal beds lay below the surface at various depths, and by the 1850s, coal mining had become the town's primary occupation.

== Yankee era (1753–1856) ==
The Susquehanna Company and early settlement

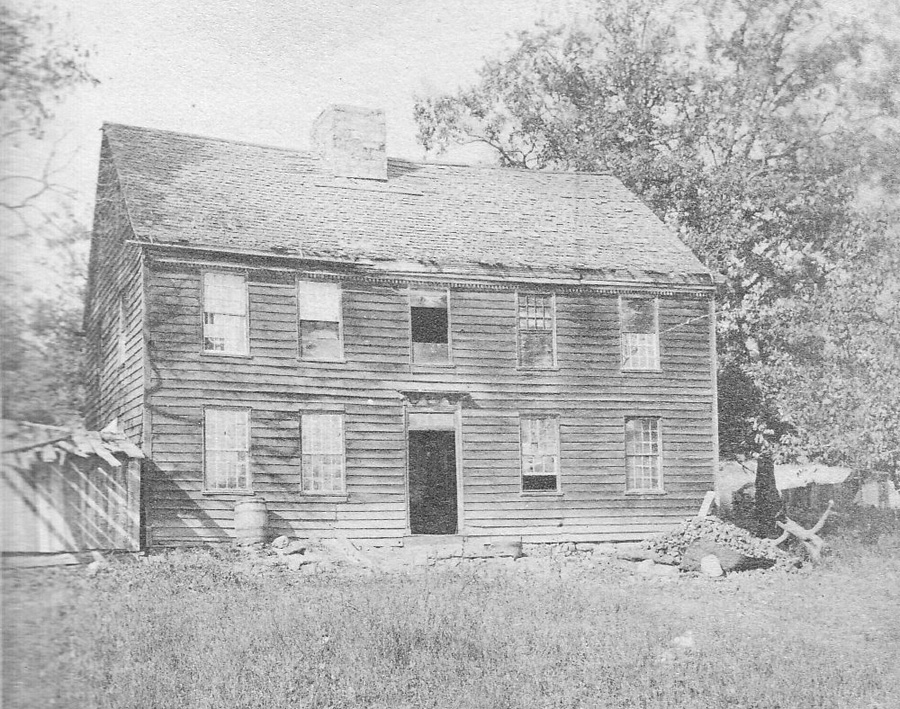
The Ransom House, which once stood near the corner of Main St. and Coal St., was an example of New England domestic architecture brought to Plymouth by Connecticut settlers.

The origins of Plymouth (also known as Shawnee and Shawneetown) date back to the creation of the Susquehanna Company in Windham, Connecticut, on June 18, 1753, formed to promote the settlement of certain lands along the Susquehanna in what is now northeastern Pennsylvania. This place, called "Wyoming", fell within the bounds of the charter issued in 1662 by Charles II to the Connecticut Colony. It also fell within the bounds of the charter issued by the same king in 1681 to William Penn, thus setting the stage for a conflict between the two colonies.

In 1754 at Albany, the Susquehanna Company purchased a deed to a tract of land along the Susquehanna River from the Iroquois (Six Nations) who had long held the land by right of conquest, and in 1769, John Durkee and a group of 240 Connecticut settlers created five townships, surveying their bounds, naming them Wilkesbarre (later renamed Wilkes-Barre), Nanticoke (later renamed Hanover), Pittstown (later renamed Pittston), Forty (later renamed Kingston) and Plymouth. During the summer of 1770, the settlers began to sub-divide the five townships into lots, and settlement began in earnest in 1772.

Armed men loyal to Pennsylvania twice attempted to evict the Connecticut settlers in what are known as the Pennamite–Yankee Wars. Following the American Revolution and ratification of the Articles of Confederation in 1781, Pennsylvania sued to resolve the conflict with Connecticut. A trial was held at Trenton, New Jersey, in 1782, and the conflict resolved in favor of Pennsylvania, which was granted full jurisdiction over the Susquehanna Company's lands.

Years of uncertainty ensued for the Connecticut settlers in the Wyoming Valley, until April 1799, when Pennsylvania passed the Compromise Act allowing settlers (in those townships which had been created and settled before the Trenton Decree of 1782) to pay a fee in return for certification of their ownership. Thus, Plymouth landowners who could establish their chain of title retained ownership of their land, but came under the jurisdiction of Pennsylvania. The process took years, but by 1811 most land claims had been resolved. Today, all ownership of land in Plymouth can be traced back to these certified titles.

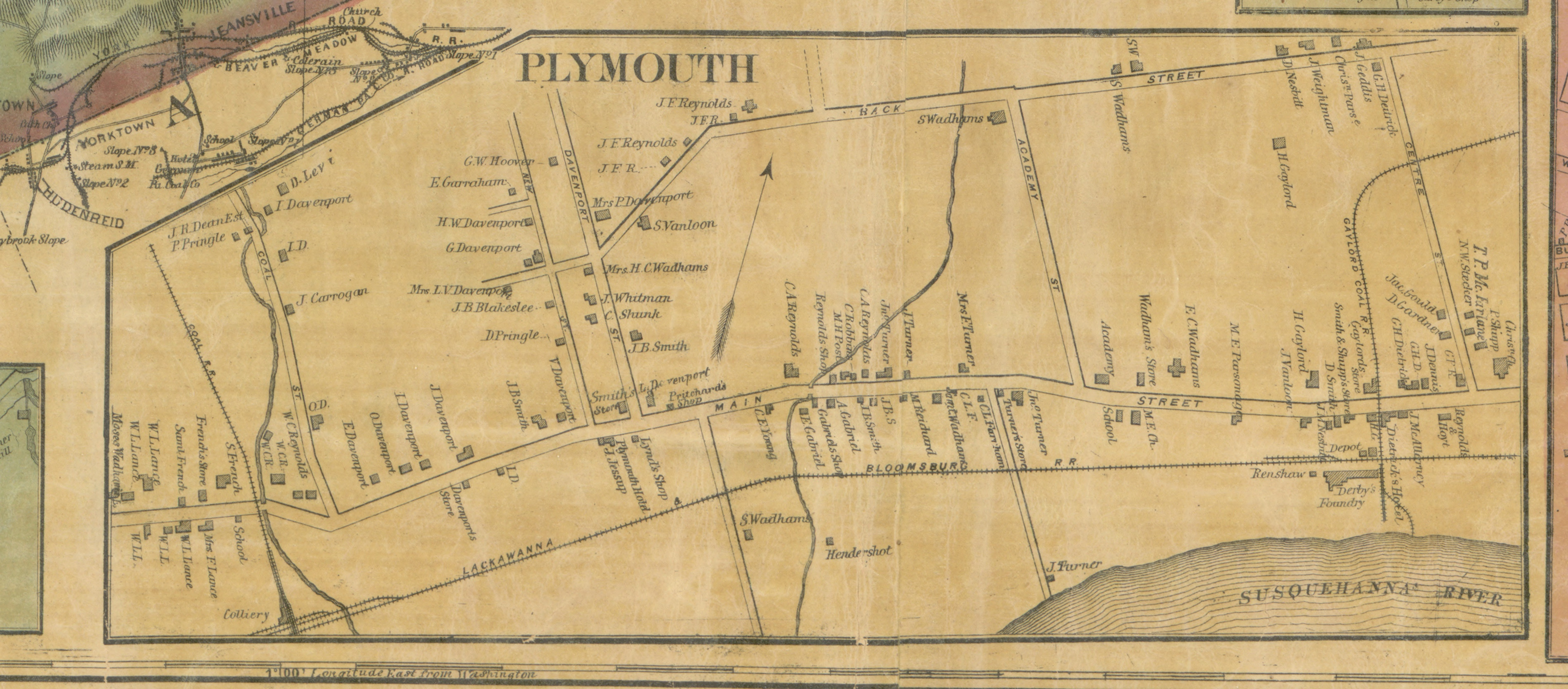
The 1864 Schooley Map illustrates the village of Plymouth two years before it was incorporated as a borough.

Large anthracite coal beds lay below Plymouth's surface at various depths. These beds were visible at a few locations in the form of outcrops, and one such location was a gorge created by Ransom Creek (now Coal Creek) located about a mile upstream from the Susquehanna River. Coal could be seen (and accessed) on both the east side (Turkey Hill) and the west side (Curry Hill) of the creek. Attracted by this outcrop, Abijah Smith came to Plymouth about 1806 from Derby, Connecticut, and bought land on the east side of the creek, intending to mine, ship and sell coal. In the fall of 1807, Smith floated an ark down the Susquehanna River loaded with about fifty tons of anthracite coal, and shipped it to Columbia in Lancaster County. The significance of Smith's shipment went unnoticed until 1873, when Hendrick B. Wright, in his Historical Sketches of Plymouth, wrote, "anthracite coal had been used before 1807, in this valley and elsewhere, in small quantities in furnaces, with an air blast; but the traffic in coal as an article of general use, was commenced by Abijah Smith, of Plymouth."

In 1811, Smith's brother, John Smith, began to mine coal on the west side of the creek. This second mine (often erroneously called Plymouth's first coal mine) achieved national fame as a kind of tourist attraction. In 1829, a writer from Wilkes-Barre posted a notice in the Connecticut Mirror, writing, "among the curiosities of our county (and we have a few) are Smith's Coal Mines, situated in Plymouth township in this county...it sends a sudden twinge through a fellow, say, to think himself walking under a mountain fifty feet through, with only here and there a pillar to support it...those who feel desirous of knowing more about this matter, must do as many others have done – go and see for themselves."

Wyoming Valley's coal industry grew steadily. In 1830, the Baltimore Patriot reported that "a greater quantity of Anthracite Coal has been sent down the Susquehanna this Spring than in any former season. The Baltimore Company have sent three thousand tons, and from other mines about seven thousand tons were dispatched, making an aggregate of ten thousand tons."

The North Branch Canal

As late as the 1840s, whenever high water allowed, coal from Wyoming Valley's coal mines was shipped down the Susquehanna River on wooden arks. But by the end of 1830, canal boats began to replace arks as the preferred method of transporting coal and other goods to market. In 1826, the Pennsylvania Board of Canal Commissioners began to survey the route of a new canal, to be called the North Branch Canal, to run alongside the north branch (the main branch) of the Susquehanna River from Northumberland to the New York border. The work was generally complete by the fall of 1830, and the first load of coal shipped from Wyoming Valley reached Berwick in October.

The canal was a boon to Plymouth's coal operators, who in 1830 included John Smith, Freeman Thomas, Henderson Gaylord and Thomas Borbidge, and encouraged others to open mines, such as Jameson Harvey and Jacob Gould. John Smith's teamsters led teams of horses deep into his mine, turned the team, loaded the wagon and then drove the team to the river bank to load the coal into canal boats. Gaylord, whose mine was at the base of Welsh Hill, improved on this method and built a gravity railroad that ran along what is now Walnut Street, down what is now Gaylord Avenue, to his wharf on the river. A similar branch, called the Swetland Railroad, was built from mines in Poke Hollow down a route which later became Washington Avenue, across Bull Run to another wharf on the river.

The early coal mines in Plymouth supported an ancillary industry, boat building. The arks used to transport goods on the river were built in a basin where Wadhams Creek entered the river. After the canal was built, the arks began to be replaced by flat-bottomed canal boats, built in the same basin with a distinctive design, known as "Shawnee boats." Many of the town's young men became boatmen and were well known along the length of the canal for their distinctive call, "Shawnee against the World."

== Years of industrial growth (1857–1900) ==
The Lackawanna and Bloomsburg Railroad

The Lackawanna and Bloomsburg Railroad reached Plymouth in 1857, and by June 1860, all 80 miles (130 km) of the railroad, from Scranton to Northumberland, were complete. In 1873, the line came under the control of the Delaware, Lackawanna and Western Railroad, which was backed by powerful New York financiers, and which operated several collieries along its length, including the Avondale Colliery in Plymouth.

The railroad's arrival led to the rapid transformation of Plymouth into a major supplier of anthracite coal. Small mining operations gave way to large, highly capitalized collieries, capable of reaching coal veins deep underground. These large operations attracted foreign labor, first from the British Isles, and then from Eastern Europe. The jobs provided by the coal industry came with the constant risk of death or injury and, for those who survived, chronic health problems. The annals of Plymouth's history include a long list of mining fatalities as well as one of the nation's greatest mine disasters.

Incorporation of Plymouth Borough

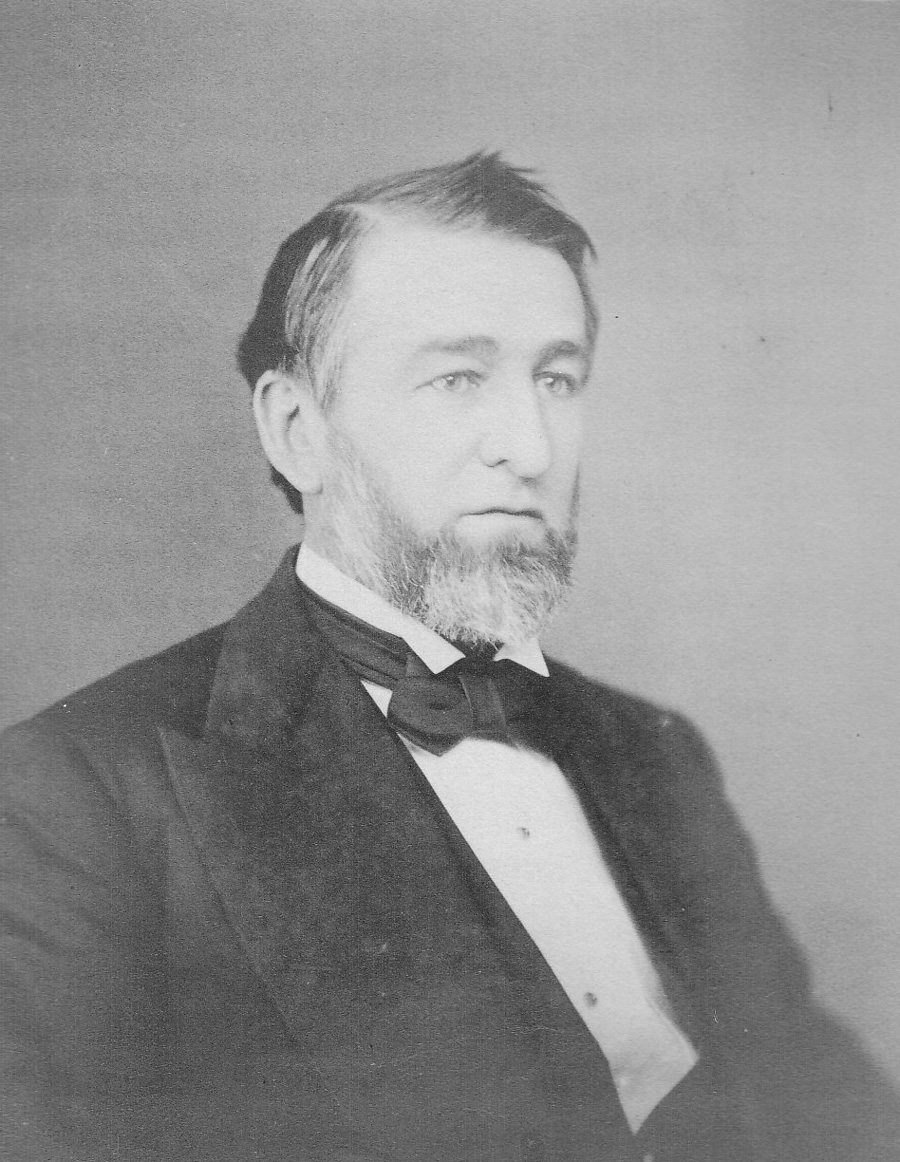
Elijah C. Wadhams was elected Plymouth Borough's first burgess (mayor) in 1866.

What is now Plymouth Borough was originally part of Plymouth Township. Plymouth Borough was incorporated in April 1866. The boundaries of the new borough extended from the line of the No. 11 Lance Coal Breaker on the east to Driscoll Street on the west, about a mile and a half; and from the river on the south to near the foot of the mountain on the north. When first created, the borough was divided into two wards, east and west, the dividing line being Academy Street. Later, these two wards were sub-divided into additional wards. After incorporation, the borough elections were held in the Old Academy where the township elections had previously been held. The first borough election was held in May 1866, and Elijah C. Wadhams was elected as the borough's first burgess.

Welsh, English, Scottish, and Irish immigration

In the wake of the arrival of the Lackawanna and Bloomsburg Railroad in 1857, a large number of immigrants came to Plymouth to work in the coal mines and, as the population grew, it became more diverse. According to the 1860 census, Plymouth Township had 2,393 residents. By the time of the 1870 census, the population had grown to 7,736, including 807 born in Ireland, 926 born in Wales, and 713 born in England. In addition to these newcomers, there were 138 Scots, 52 Germans, 39 Canadians, 5 French, and 1 Norwegian. Moreover, many of the 4,635 Pennsylvania-born residents were the children of these immigrants. By 1870, roughly 75% of the town's population was either foreign-born, or the children of foreign-born parents.

The influx of immigrants from the British Isles led to the construction of several new buildings, including St. Vincent's church for the Roman Catholic congregation, St. Peter's for the Anglicans, the Presbyterian church for a largely Scottish congregation and several new churches for a variety of Welsh congregations.

Avondale mine disaster

The Avondale Mine Disaster occurred on September 6, 1869, when 108 men and boys died at the Avondale Colliery, located just west of the Plymouth borough line. A fire in the mine shaft, ignited by a ventilating furnace, spread to the breaker which stood over the shaft. The breaker was destroyed by fire, trapping those working in the mine below. All were killed, as were two men who volunteered to enter the mine soon after the fire. One result of the disaster was the enactment in 1870 of a law regulating mining which required employment by the State of mine inspectors, the mapping of all mine works, the creation of two means of egress from every mine, provision for proper ventilation, reporting and investigation of all accidents and the establishment of rules of conduct for employees.

Labor troubles

A bank panic on September 18, 1873, led to a prolonged national depression, and by 1877 there were about three million unemployed, roughly 25 percent of the working population. These circumstances led to the outbreak known as the Great Railroad Strike of 1877. It was the first nationwide strike, one in which Plymouth played a small but interesting part. Samuel L. French, Plymouth's burgess at the time, recalled,

"In July, 1877, almost immediately succeeding the peaceful enjoyments incident to the centennial celebration of our national independence, the country was startled at the outbreak of very serious rioting by the railroad employees of Pittsburgh. These outbreaks of lawlessness, like an epidemic of a contagious disease, rapidly spread over near the entire state. Railroad traffic was for a time interrupted, employees being assaulted and engines and cars demolished. Local authorities were utterly unable to cope with the situation."

On July 25, a general strike was called in northeastern Pennsylvania on the Delaware and Hudson Railroad and the Delaware, Lackawanna and Western Railroad (the line that ran through Plymouth). The mine workers employed by these railroads (many from Plymouth) struck as well. On August 2, three thousand state militia troops arrived in the Wyoming Valley. Samuel L. French wrote,

"The miners in the anthracite regions of Schuylkill and Luzerne and Lackawanna counties were at the time on strike and soon became infected. A demon like spirit seemed to pervade the masses. In Scranton, Mayor McKune had been violently assaulted, and a posse of the leading citizens had fired upon and killed several of the rioters. A passenger train on the L&B R.R., arriving at Plymouth from Northumberland in the evening was stoned and the train obliged to remain on the siding at the depot. I was Burgess at the time and a committee of representative citizens reported to me, their fears of contemplated incendiarism against certain of the properties located here and connected with mining industries, and requested me to officially invoke protection from the State. I telegraphed the State authorities and soon thereafter a regiment of soldiers was in possession of the town."

"...Brigadier General E. W. Matthews, a former school teacher in Plymouth, was in charge of the troops which invaded the town. In front of the engine of the train which carried the troops was placed a gun, and at Nanticoke several companies were disembarked, and as skirmishers, during the night, proceeded up the road, taking into custody every man caught out of doors. Near a hundred of these night prowlers were thus captured, quite a number in Plymouth, some of whom were carried to Scranton, there to give an account of their actions. The troops remained stationed here, and in the locality for several weeks, the staff officers using the stalled railroad cars for their headquarters."

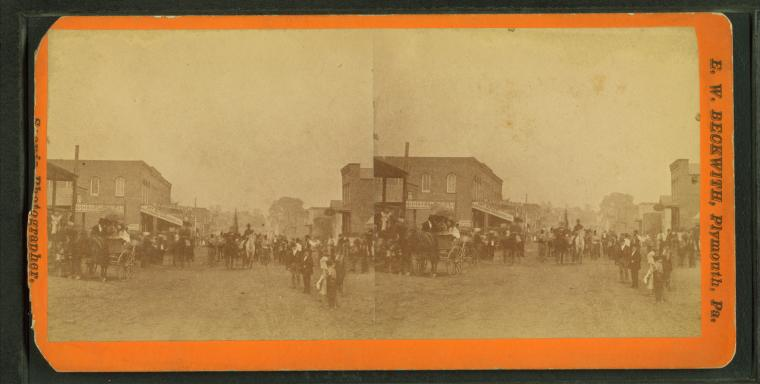
A view of Main Street in Plymouth about 1877.

Polish, Lithuanian, and Slovak immigration

By 1880, a new mix was added to the population of Plymouth with the arrival of immigrants from Eastern Europe. These were welcomed by the mining companies because they worked for low wages, and thus undercut the bargaining power of the increasingly organized Irish and Welsh miners. In the 1880 census, only 86 of Plymouth's residents were born in Poland, 25 in Prussia, 9 in Hungary, 8 in Austria, and 2 in Russia. Most likely they were all ethnically Slovak, Lithuanian, and Polish. Like most immigrants, many of the new arrivals were poor and uneducated and, at first, spoke little or no English. They were referred to in the press as "foreigners" and during the early years of their arrival were often made to feel unwelcome. Their function as strike-breakers added to their unpopularity. On February 26, 1890, The Philadelphia Inquirer reported:

"The Poles and Hungarians who live in such numbers in Plymouth and vicinity promise to be speedily cleared out. At different times before several hundred have been shipped away to fill the strikers place at Punxsutawney by the agents of the company who are circulating throughout this region and today 300 more were sent off in a special train. They left on the Delaware, Lackawanna and Western Railroad at 11 o'clock, many of them accompanied by their wives and children and carrying a most miscellaneous collection of goods with them. Each man was supplied with a bottle of whiskey, a big paper of tobacco, and a ticket to Punxsutawney. Another batch is being raised and will leave Plymouth in a day or two."

While some of the Eastern European immigrants were transitory, many more came to Plymouth and stayed, eventually forming a large and important part of the population. By 1890, Plymouth boasted three Roman Catholic churches with Eastern European congregations, St. Mary's (Polish), St. Stephen's (Slovak), and St. Casimir's (Lithuanian). By the 1920s, these three groups were said to represent 40% of the town's population.

The first Central High School

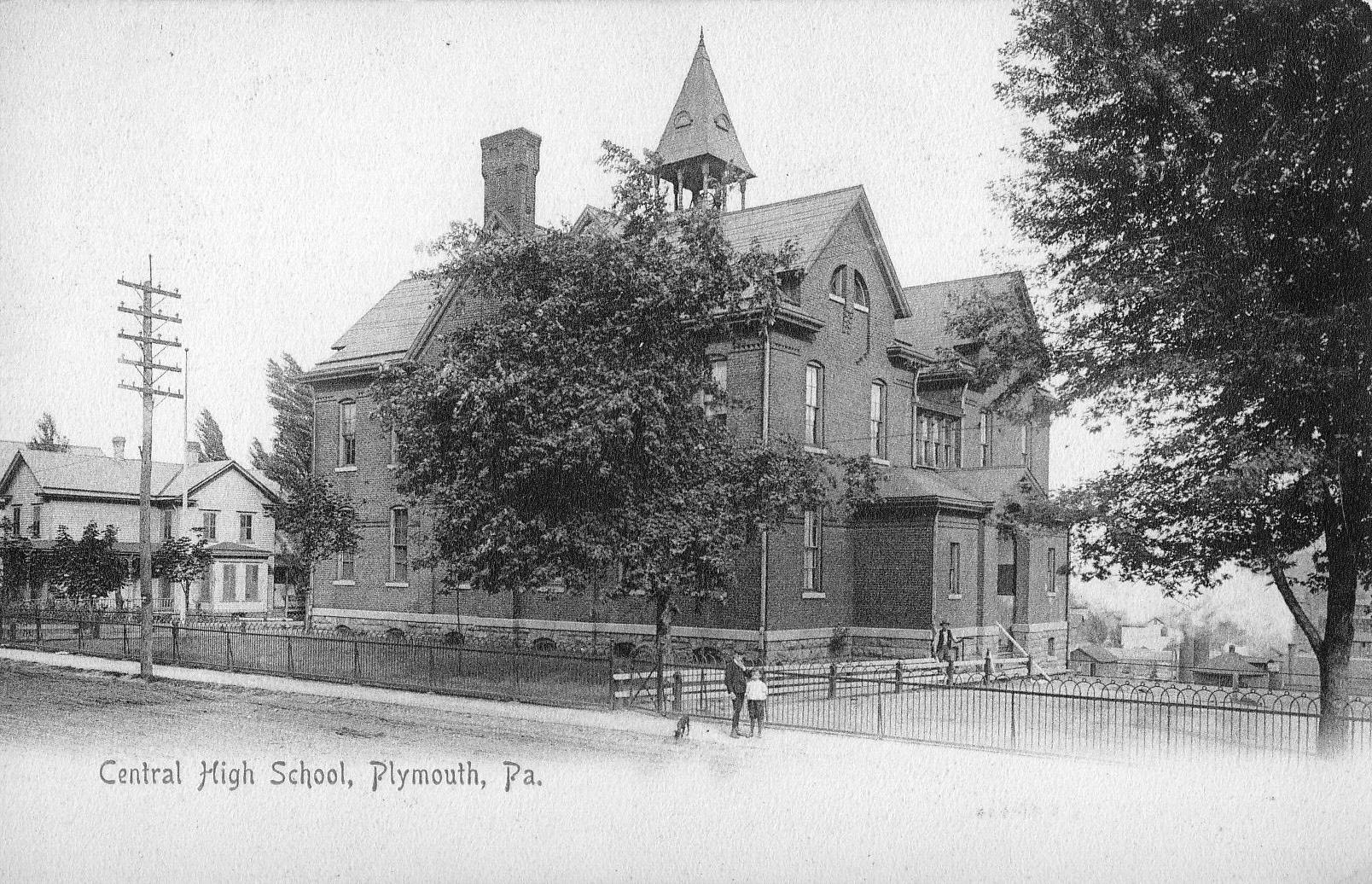
Plymouth's Central High School was built in 1884 and was destroyed by fire in 1905.

The first Central High School was designed by the architect Frederick J. Amsden, and built in 1884 by Samuel Livingston French and his Plymouth Planing Mill Co. The school saw its first graduating class in 1886, but was destroyed by fire in February 1905. According to the February 24, 1905 edition of the Wilkes-Barre Times:

"A serious fire occurred at Plymouth this morning at 12:30, when the Plymouth Central high school was so badly gutted and damaged that it will have to be re-built. The building is located on Shawnee Avenue, only a short distance from the busiest section of that town, it being about 1,300 feet from the Pioneer and Wyoming Valley knitting mills and Shawnee box factory. The fire was discovered at 12:30 and an alarm was rung from Box 26 calling out the entire fire department which quickly responded, but the blaze had gained considerable headway and a sheet of flames could be seen issuing from the top of the building."

The Typhoid Epidemic of 1885

The physicians who staffed the temporary hospital in the Central High School, prepared a map of Plymouth's water supply, to illustrate how typhoid was transmitted.

The Typhoid Epidemic of 1885 was caused by contamination of the town's water supply. Like the Avondale Mine Disaster of 1869, it aroused the sympathy of the entire nation. The epidemic was eventually traced to a dairy farmer who lived on Mountain Road alongside Coal Creek, the stream that fed the town's water supply. During the Christmas holiday in 1884, he visited his brother, the owner of a cigar store in Philadelphia, and returned home in January ill with typhoid. During his weeks of recuperation, the snow on the ground around his farmhouse became contaminated. At the same time, the water company's reservoirs had become so low, that the company began to pump water, as a substitute source, from the Susquehanna River.

In late March, the weather began to warm and the snow began to melt, so that the stream and one of its reservoirs (known as the Third Water Dam) became contaminated. Furthermore, because of the melting snow, the reservoir began to fill. Hoping to stop pumping river water, the water company's superintendent lit a fire at the exit pipe of the reservoir, allowing water to flow freely downstream and contaminate the town's water supply.

By the week of April 12, between 50 and 100 new cases were reported daily. By September, 1,104 cases were recorded (out of a population of just over 8,000), including 713 in April, 261 in May, 83 in June, 31 in July, 15 in August and 1 in September. Taking into account unreported cases, the number was probably much higher.

Dr. Morris Stroud French was a physician in Philadelphia at the time of the epidemic, one of several sent to Plymouth to set up a temporary hospital in the Central High School building. After the epidemic, French prepared a report of the hospital's activities, listing all the patients who were treated, the ward where they lived, the length and cost of their treatment, and, when applicable, the date of their death. French recorded 1,153 victims, of whom 114 died. He estimated the cost of the epidemic, including the cost of treatment and lost wages, at about $100,000.

Martin Wilkes and the Polish–Lithuanian Church War

By the time that the 1887 city directory was published, there were three Roman Catholic congregations in Plymouth: "St. Vincent's Catholic Church" (for "English-speaking"—mostly Irish) Catholics, "St. Stephen's Hungarian Catholic Church", (for Slovaks), and "St. Mary's Polish Catholic Church" (for Poles and Lithuanians). St. Mary's congregation was founded in the spring of 1885. The trustees purchased land on Willow Street and built a small wooden church (on the site of the later school building). Although the Poles and Lithuanians spoke different languages, their histories were intertwined, and the Diocese of Scranton assumed the two groups would amicably share the same church and cemetery so long as their parish priest was fluent in both languages. As it turned out, there was animosity between them. In 1889–1890, these feelings were inflamed by an outspoken parishioner named Martin Wilkes, who came to be known in the national press as "the Polish King". Wilkes was born in Poland and immigrated to the United States in 1873. By the time of the 1880 census, he was working as a coal miner, living in West Nanticoke, and by 1889, he had acquired a saloon, gained a small following and proclaimed himself leader of the Poles in Plymouth.

St. Mary's congregation's first priest was Polish. But after he departed, trouble arose when the Diocese of Scranton appointed, not once, but twice, a Lithuanian priest to St. Mary's. The Poles objected on the grounds that their greater number, earlier arrival and greater financial contribution entitled them to preference. The second Lithuanian priest, Father Alexandras Burba, was appointed to St. Mary's on August 22, 1889. Burba spoke Polish and Lithuanian, but was an ardent Lithuanian nationalist; the Polish trustees allowed him to celebrate mass in the church but refused to give him possession of the parsonage. On October 22, Bishop O'Hara arrived from Scranton and sent Father Mack (of the St. Vincent's congregation) to gain access to the parsonage, but when he knocked on the door, he was "met by three guns pointing at him from an upstairs window."

Next, Father Mack went to the Town Hall and got warrants for the arrest of the rebel faction, after which the police arrested three of them. When the rebels reached the town lock-up (in an effort to rescue the prisoners), they encountered constable Michael Melvin and in the ensuing scuffle broke his leg. According to The Philadelphia Inquirer, The Polanders still hold possession of the priest's house tonight. The Burgess says he will clear every man out tomorrow if he has to make dead men of them all."

After this episode, Father Burba departed St. Mary's, and the split between the two nationalities became permanent, with the Lithuanians forming their own congregation and building their own church, completed in December 1890.

The electric railway and the Carey Avenue Bridge

The Plymouth Street Railway was incorporated on May 14, 1889, and in 1891 its directors built an electric railway, or trolley line, down the middle of Plymouth's Main Street, running from the east end of the borough to a turn-around at the west end of town. That same year, the line was extended along the north side of Ross Hill to Edwardsville, where transfers could be made to a similar railway that ran across the Market Street Bridge to Wilkes-Barre. When the Plymouth Street Railway was complete, the Wilkes-Barre & Wyoming Valley Traction Co. leased it and operated it along with several other trolley lines. After the Carey Avenue Bridge was completed in the spring of 1895, the Wilkes-Barre & Wyoming Valley Traction Co. built a second railway line across the bridge, providing a second, more direct route to Wilkes-Barre's public square.

Ultimately, the network included the boroughs and townships of Ashley, Courtdale, Edwardsville, Forty Fort, Hanover, Kingston, Larksville, Miners Mills, Nanticoke, Parsons, Pittston, Plains, Plymouth, Sugar Notch, West Pittston, West Wyoming, Wilkes-Barre, and Wyoming. The trolley cars ran until the 1950s and were an important amenity, making it easier for residents to go to work, to shop, to visit friends and relatives, and to spend time at new amusement parks that sprung up along the lines, including Sans Souci Park, located between Nanticoke and Wilkes-Barre.

The Spanish–American War

In 1898, the Ninth Regiment, a state militia organization founded in 1879 and headquartered in Wilkes-Barre, volunteered to serve in the war with Spain. On April 27, 1898, two days after Spain declared war, the various companies that formed the regiment (including Plymouth's Company I) met at the Wilkes-Barre armory and marched to the Lehigh Valley railroad station. Enthusiasm for the war was at a high point, and it was estimated that 130,000 people gathered to see the troops off. In May, they made camp at Chickamauga Park, Georgia, where in July an outbreak of typhoid occurred with roughly half of the 1,300 troops contracting the disease, from which 29 men died. The war ended on August 12 while the Ninth Regiment was still camped in Georgia, and on September 19 the regiment returned to Wilkes-Barre. Plymouth's Company I was led by Capt. Harry W. Pierce, First Lieut. Adnah McDaniel, Second Lieut. William F. Powell, First Sergeant George W. Kostenbauder and Quartermaster Sergeant John May. The musicians were John T. Hayward and George N. Van Loon.

The end of the 19th century

During the last thirty-five years of the 19th century, Plymouth had nearly reached its ultimate state. Virtually all the streets that would ever be created were now in place, and most of the houses, churches and commercial buildings that would ever be built had now been built. Plymouth's coal mines were established and consolidated in the hands of a small number of operators, and its water system, telegraph and telephone service, electrical lines and gas pipes were fully developed. A trolley system connected the residents to all of the neighboring towns and cities. The next three decades would be prosperous ones during which the town's residents would enjoy the bounty of the years of industrial growth. Coal production would grow and the population steadily increase in size and wealth. One of the problems that this increase presented was the need to build sufficient school buildings to accommodate the growing population, and the growing number of families who could now afford to send their children to school, rather than to work in the mines.

== Years of prosperity (1901–1929) ==
The Great Flood of 1902

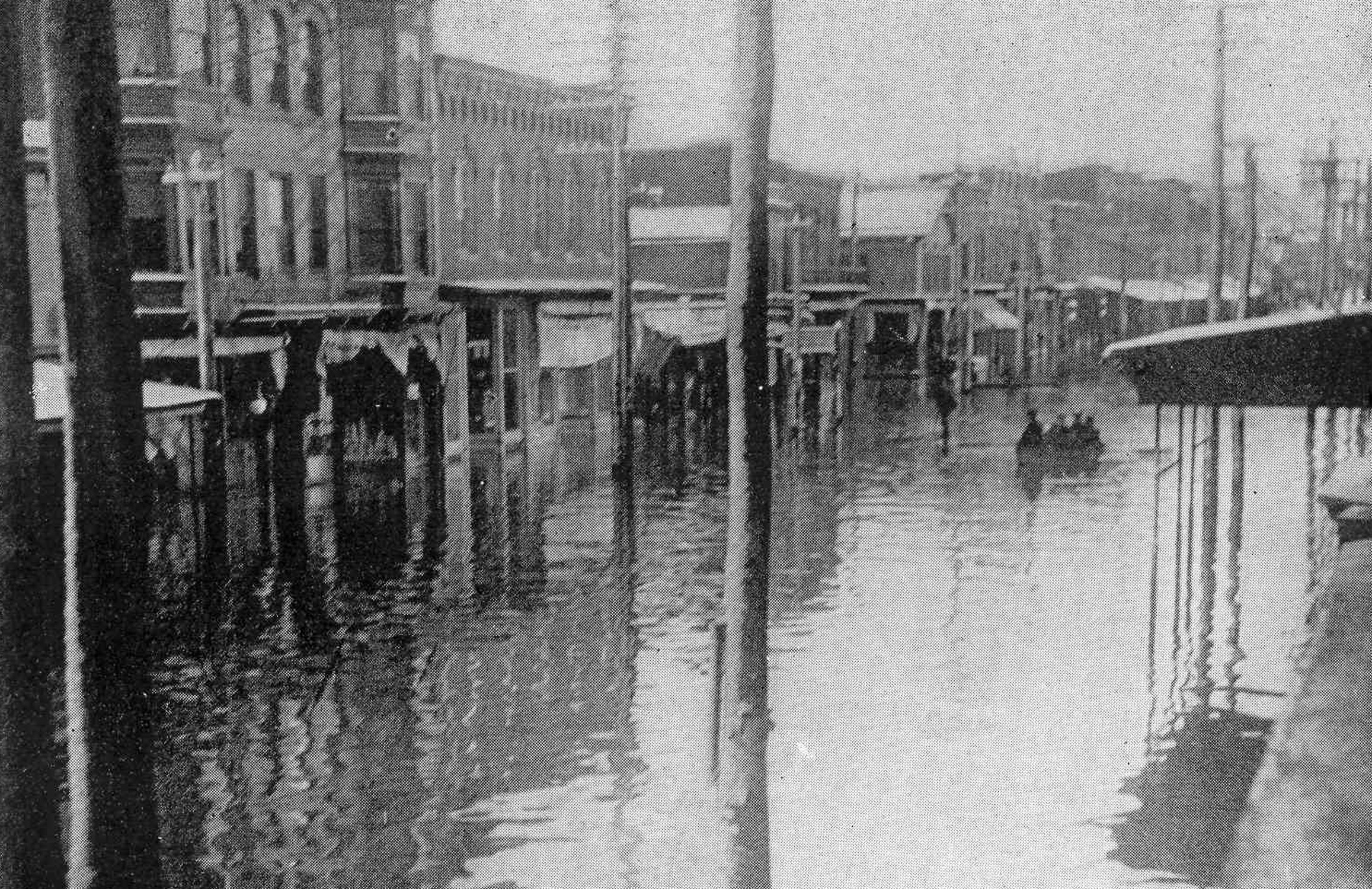
A view of Main Street, looking east from Center Ave. during the 1902 flood

One of the most destructive floods in the history of the Wyoming Valley occurred on Sunday, March 2, 1902, when the waters of the Susquehanna River rose and flooded a vast developed area. It was the largest flood since the Great Flood of 1865. Eight deaths were reported in Wilkes-Barre. The temperature suddenly rose, and snow which had covered much of the Susquehanna's watershed melted. At the same time, more than 2 inches (51 mm) of rain fell within a short period. The combined melted snow and rain caused the river to rise rapidly and the ice to break on February 28. All day Saturday, March 1, the river rose, until Sunday when it crested at 31 feet (9.4 m) above the low water mark.

Wyoming Valley had experienced less extensive flooding a few months earlier, on December 15, 1901, and therefore, residents were more prepared than they might have been. In Plymouth, water covered the streets closest to the river and surrounded or flooded many houses. The railroads were damaged, bridges were swept away and great portions of roadbeds washed out. Wyoming Valley's street car system was paralyzed, and it was a few weeks before cars were run regularly.

Plymouth recovered quickly from the 1902 flood. On March 6, trains began running on schedule to Scranton on the Delaware, Lackawanna and Western Railroad. And by March 8, the first street car arrived in town from Edwardsville. The West family set up an electric pump on Main Street and began pumping out flooded cellars for the town's businessmen. Capt. Theodore Renshaw went to Peter Shupp's old house on Center Avenue and measured the flood's high-water mark and found it to be at street curb level. Renshaw recalled that the 1865 flood had risen 6 inches (150 mm) above the floor of Shupp's residence, and calculated that the 1865 flood had been 2'-9" higher than the 1902 flood.

The second Central High School

The architect of the second Central High School was Harry Livingston French. In 1905, when French was awarded the commission to design the new school, he was already well known to the Plymouth school board: French was a native of Plymouth, descended from an old and distinguished family. In 1900, when the school board commissioned him to design alterations to the Franklin Street School, Harry French had been an architect for only a few years. He graduated from Cornell University in 1894, but soon after left for Meeker, Colorado, where his brother practiced medicine. French spent sixteen months in Meeker, returning east in the beginning of 1897. By April 1899, his firm, McCormick & French, had won third place in the design competition for the new Luzerne County Courthouse. For their efforts, they received a prize of $300. However, in 1905, architect F. J. Osterling of Pittsburgh, the winner of the competition, was forced to resign in the middle of construction. He was replaced by McCormick & French.

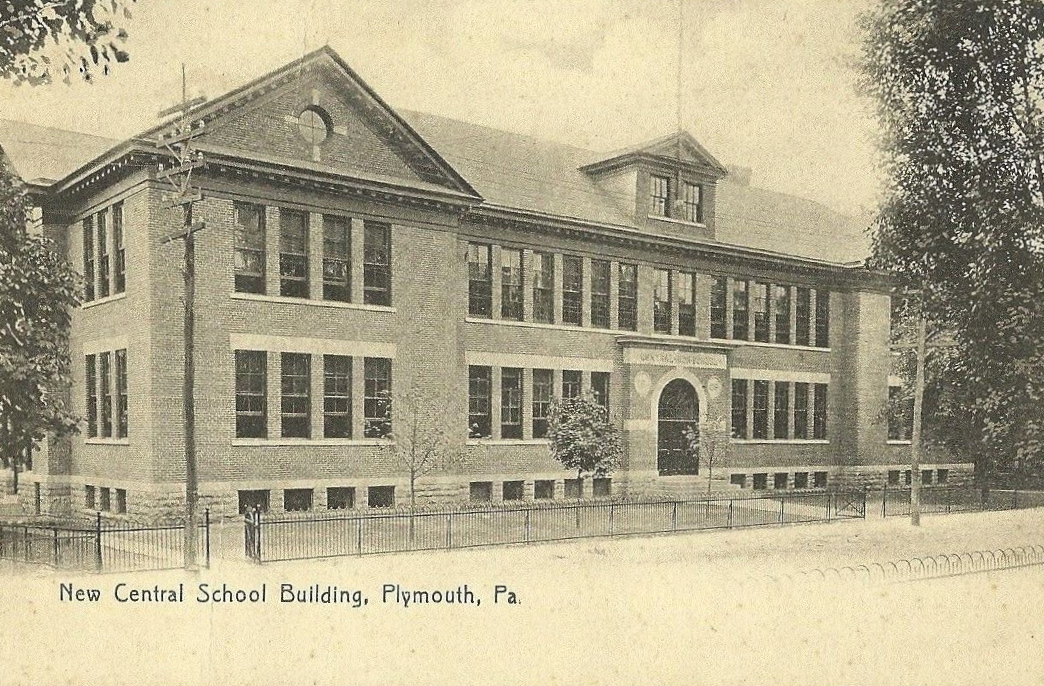
Plymouth's second Central High School was built after the first school was destroyed by fire in 1905.

Harry French inherited numerous social, business and political connections — his father was Samuel Livingston French, born in Plymouth on September 8, 1839, a great-grandson of Noah Wadhams, Plymouth's illustrious 18th century preacher. Samuel L. French was a veteran of the Civil War, having served in the Union Army from 1861 to 1862. Afterwards, he was a politically active Republican. In 1872, he was elected Register of Wills for Luzerne County, and in 1874, became the first clerk of the Orphans' Court. In 1875, he was elected to the first of several terms as Burgess of Plymouth, and held that office during the great labor troubles of 1877. Samuel L. French was also an amateur historian — he wrote a book about the Army of the Potomac, and in 1915 published Reminiscences of Plymouth, his homage to the antebellum years of his hometown.

In 1880, Samuel L. French became a retail lumber dealer, founding the Plymouth Planing Mill Company, which he ran until 1902. It was this company which built the old Central High School in 1884. The old school, and the new one that replaced it, sat on a bluff overlooking the Parrish Colliery of the Lehigh & Wilkes-Barre Coal Co. Both school and colliery sat on land that once was part of the Wadhams estate. After the fire, the school board must have engaged McCormick and French immediately, for it was only one month after the fire that the board met to announce that the architects' plans were accepted, plans for a much larger building than the original. On March 23, 1905, the Wilkes-Barre Times reported:

"At a special meeting of the school board held last evening in the office of the secretary, J. A. Opp, held for the purpose of adopting the plans and specifications of the proposed new school building, which is to take the place of the building which was burned down on February 24, it was decided to accept the plans that had been prepared by McCormick and French. The plans are for a building of sixteen rooms, which is twice the size of the old building, and it will be a substantial structure, which will be one of the prettiest buildings in town. The secretary was instructed to advertise for bid, and another meeting will be called on April 12 for the purpose of opening the bids and awarding the contract. A motion was unanimously carried that the sale of bonds be held in the office of the secretary on April 10."

On June 1 that year, the class of "nineteen-five" held its commencement exercises. Fourteen students received their diplomas. Charles H. Kaeufer read an eloquent speech entitled "Memorial of the Central Building".

"Workmen have now removed the last traces of the old school. Whatever will remain of the old building in the future is embedded in the minds and hearts of the boys and girls who have come to maturity during the twenty-one years of its usefulness. The shelter which the building has afforded has resulted in the up-building of character and the implanting of healthy sentiments in the boys and girls of Plymouth. The expenditure has not been in vain. The building has been a fortress against ignorance and superstition. Its memory should be cherished lovingly. Patriotism has been infused, industry fostered, and wickedness condemned. Therefore the influence of the building must be ranked among the permanent possessions of the community."

On the following evening, the Plymouth High School Alumni Association held its fourth annual banquet. Mrs. L. S. Smith, one of the "few surviving members" of the first graduating class (1886), spoke of her memories of the old school, a talk that was followed by a musical presentation and a toast given by the future governor of Pennsylvania, Arthur James.

The summer of 1905 came and went as work began on the new school. On August 18, the Times reported that "sills were laid for the new Central School house yesterday." On August 26, pupils were ordered to report to Rooms 7 and 8 of the Willow St. School. The class of 1906 would spend the entire school year in temporary quarters, for it was not until Labor Day, September 3, 1906, that the new building was dedicated. The Wilkes-Barre Times sent a reporter:

"Plymouth's handsome new High school was dedicated and formally opened to-day with impressive and appropriate exercises amid the cheers of several thousand people. Prior to the exercises at the school there was a grand parade, in which many secret societies from in and out of town took part, together with bands of music ... The parade formed at the corner of Main and Bridge Streets, moved to Davenport, countermarched to Gaylord and thence to the high school where the exercises were held ... "The progress of the public school" was the subject of an eloquent address by J. Q. Creveling, who began by comparing the present school system with that of years gone by when Plymouth and all its institutions were in their infancy. He spoke of the rapid advancement in the education of America's army of children and of the responsibility resting upon the thousands of men and women employed in the work of fitting them to enter upon life's duties."

The event was organized by the Junior Order of United American Mechanics, perhaps a union representing the men who built the building. The O.U.A.M. presented the school with a new flag as well as a bible for each classroom. The new building served as Plymouth's high school for only seven years, for on Labor Day, September 1913, another parade and dedication exercise took place, this time to celebrate the opening of yet another new high school building — this one on Main Street. After 1913, the 1906 Central High School was used to educate children in the lower grades.

The third high school building

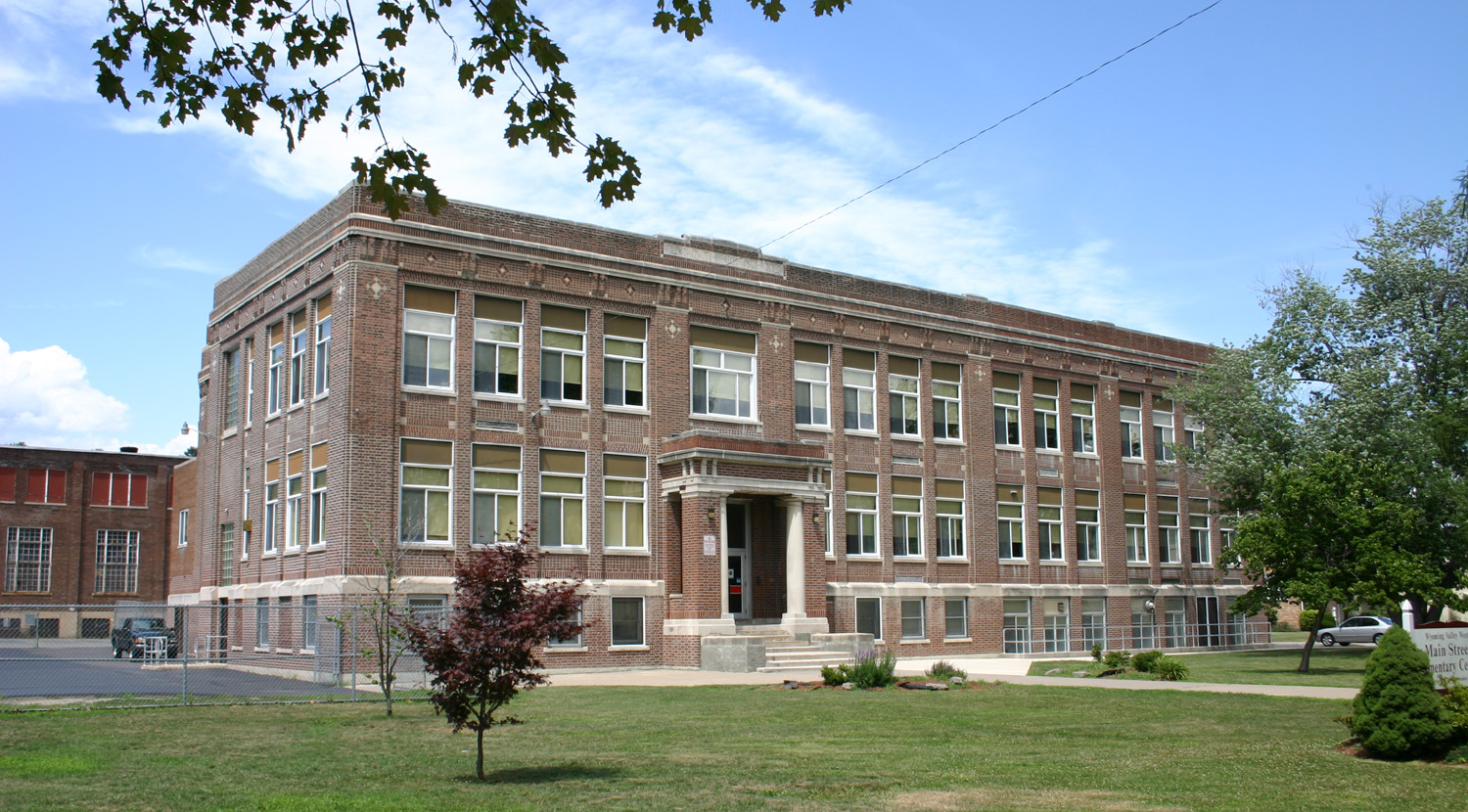
Plymouth's 1913 high school building was designed by architect Alfred Freeman. The portion to the far right, fronting Wadhams Street, was added later.

Plymouth's third high school building was dedicated on September 1, 1913, following a large parade through the town. The parade featured the police force, three fire departments, the school directors, school children on floats, various labor unions and several fraternal organizations. At the ceremony, the Central School children sang "March of our Nation", and after the graduates of the class of 1914 raised the flag, the students and audience sang "The Star-Spangled Banner", accompanied by the school's marching band. The chairman of the dedication ceremony was Harold L. Freeman, and the architect of the new building was his brother, New York's Alfred Freeman, a Plymouth native and graduate of Plymouth High School's class of 1892. The building was built by Perkins and Heffernan, and the plumbing work installed by Doyle Brothers, both Plymouth firms.

The building (which was later added onto) had four rooms on the first floor and four on the second floor plus a large study room. The basement was reserved for the cloakrooms, boiler rooms, lavatories and a room for the School Directors.

William B. Cleary, writing in the Wilkes-Barre Times Leader, noted that "The new school building is located in the central portion of the town, set back sufficiently from the main street to give it an important position and affords an opportunity to make most attractive grounds."

Plymouth's third high school building was converted to an elementary school in July 1979, and demolished in August 2014. Architectural historian (and former attendee) Michael Lewis commented in The Times Leader newspaper: "As far as architecture is concerned, the high school is neither original nor innovative. It is simply one of those solid, serviceable and beautifully constructed school buildings built a century ago, when it seemed that America could build durable and efficient public buildings effortlessly."

The First World War

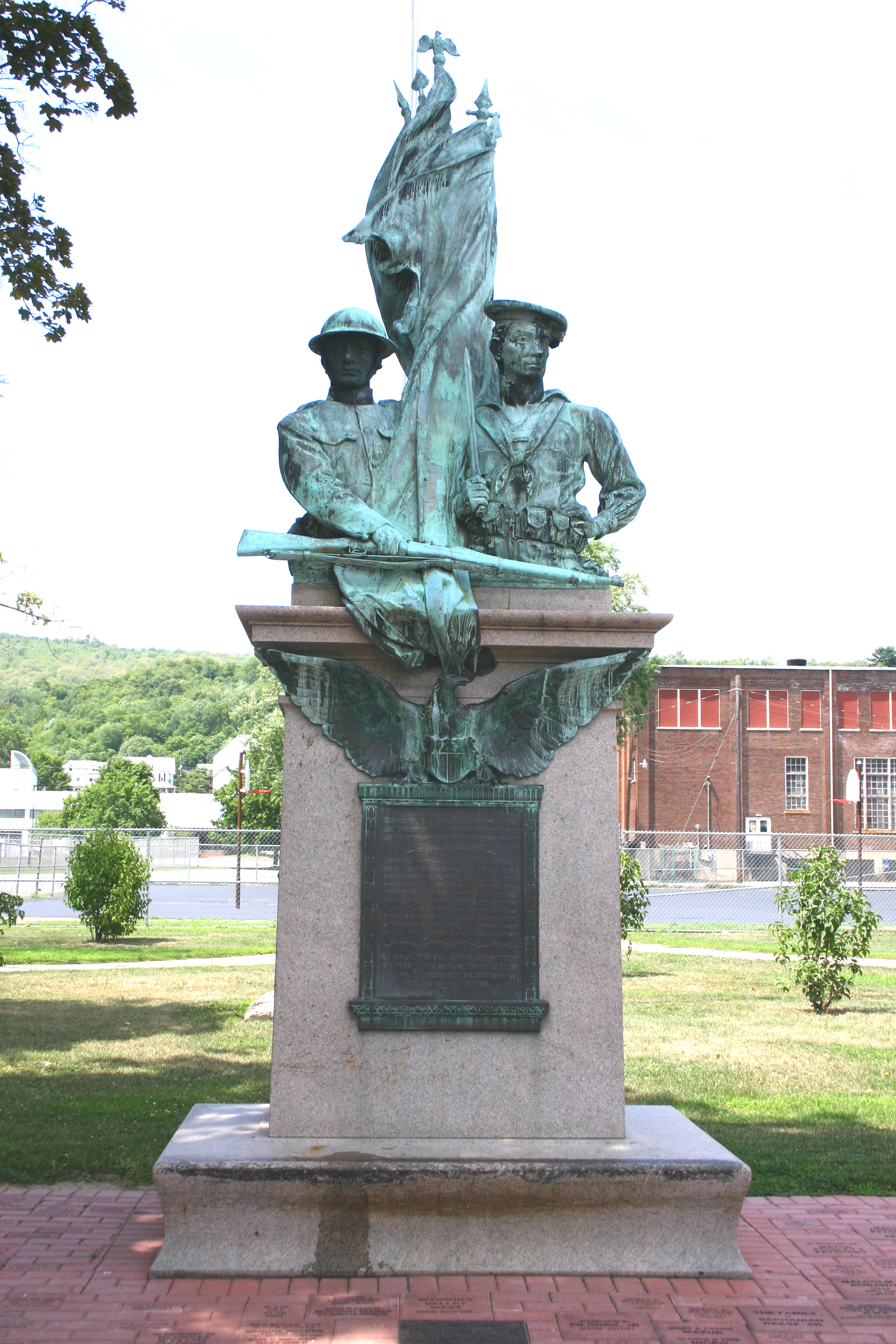
The Soldiers and Sailors Monument in 2007

The First World War broke out in 1914, but America remained neutral until it declared war on Germany on April 6, 1917. The Selective Service Act of 1917 was passed on May 18, 1917, and by July a lottery was scheduled so that local districts could meet their assigned quotas of men. District 6 (comprising Plymouth and Larksville boroughs) was initially required to furnish 154 men, and many more, men and women, would eventually serve. The war ended when an armistice was signed on November 11, 1918, but "Welcome Home" day in Plymouth was not celebrated until June 30, 1919. That day, a parade formed, with the public school students gathering at Wadhams Street, fraternal lodges on Girard Avenue, soldiers and sailors on Gaylord Avenue, the Polish and Slovak societies on Centre Avenue, and Catholic school children on Eno Street. Participants marched up to the Carey Avenue Bridge and back to Gaylord Avenue where they disbanded. Burgess George E. Gwilliam declared the day to be "one of rejoicing with a cessation of all labor", and banned all cars and trolleys from the streets. After the parade, all four movie theaters opened their doors to veterans free of charge.

By the time of the "Welcome Home" parade of 1919, a fundraising drive was underway to erect a monument to the soldiers and sailors who had served in the First World War. A committee was formed, and George T. Brewster (1862–1943), a sculptor from New York, was engaged. Brewster had studied at the Massachusetts State Normal Art School, and in Paris at the École des Beaux-Arts. Since 1915, he had been busy creating a large number of statues, busts and relief portraits for the Vicksburg National Military Park. For Plymouth, Brewster prepared a design of two life-size figures, a soldier and sailor, mounted atop a granite base. In the contract, the sculptor agreed not to duplicate the design anywhere in Pennsylvania. The unveiling was scheduled for November 11, 1919, but the work was delayed and funds ran short. The bronze plaque, listing the names of the fallen, was optimistically dated Memorial Day, 1920. The dedication finally took place on November 11, 1920, two years after the war's end. Schools and mines were closed for the day, and afterward a parade formed, said to be Plymouth's largest ever. The monument still stands and is the principal public work of art in the borough.

The fourth high school building

Plymouth's 1925 high school building was designed by architect Louis Hancock. The third high school, seen at the far right, became the junior high school.

Plymouth's fourth high school building, designed by the Scranton-based architect Louis Hancock, was completed in 1925 on a site immediately to the west of the third high school (which then became the Junior High School building). The new building cost $203,000 and was dedicated on February 12, 1925. A few weeks before the dedication, a reporter took a tour of the building, writing that:

"After years of anticipation and debate, the new high school represents the achievement of an ideal. It has advanced Plymouth several years ahead of the status formerly held. Allied with the adjacent recreation field, where athletics are carried out, the school is a complete foundry of young manhood and young womanhood, an inspiration to the spirit that has written the name of Plymouth High School upon the top of the roster of public educational institutions."

Many of the town's residents credited school board member Ward P. Davenport for expediting the construction of the school, for attending to its details and for keeping the costs under control. By the time the school was complete, Davenport was in poor health and retreated to Atlantic City to recuperate. Davenport's health did not improve, and the December 1925 issue of the school's newspaper, the Shawnee Arrow, made note of his death. By the spring of 1926, the school had been renamed Ward P. Davenport High School, and the stone tablet over the front door with the inscription "Plymouth High School" was replaced with one inscribed with Davenport's name.

== Years of retrenchment (1930–1972) ==
The Plymouth Post Office before the addition of 1966.

Plymouth Post Office

In November 1933, funds were allocated for a new post office building in Plymouth. The allocation was expedited by two Plymouth natives, Michael E. Comerford, the movie-theater owner, who happened to be the regional representative of the recently created National Recovery Administration, and Frank C. Walker, Comerford's nephew, a Roosevelt ally and the NRA's executive secretary. Among the sites suggested by the Plymouth Chamber of Commerce was the east half of the old railroad depot, across Main Street from the Plymouth high school, more or less where the new post office was built. Construction began in January 1935 and the building was dedicated on November 23, 1935. President Franklin D. Roosevelt was an amateur architect who admired early American architecture, and the new building was designed in the Georgian style that was especially popular at the time. An addition, undistinguished but sympathetic to the original wing, was built in the 1960s.

The post office's most interesting feature is a mural installed in 1938 by the artist Jared Blanford French (1905–1988) entitled "Mealtime, The Early Coal Miners", one of more than 1,200 works of art commissioned by the U.S. Treasury between the years 1934 and 1943 through a program intended to embellish Federal buildings and encourage the arts during the Great Depression. French's mural and the town's Soldiers and Sailors monument are the two most significant secular public works of art in Plymouth.

Great Flood of 1936

One of the Susquehanna River's most damaging floods occurred in March 1936. In the Wyoming Valley, the flood waters covered approximately 45 square miles (120 km^{2}). Property loss in Plymouth Borough alone was estimated to be about $1,000,000. A large number of Plymouth residents were left homeless, and many volunteers responded to help with rescue and relief efforts. These were coordinated from headquarters set up in the Town Hall building. The Vine Street and Franklin Street schools were converted to temporary dormitories, and the Central School served as a makeshift hospital. The town's three fire companies patrolled the flooded areas during the inundation, and afterward did duty pumping out flooded cellars. After the flood waters receded, Atty. Harold L. Freeman and Mrs. John Q. Mask chaired a fund-raising drive to aid families left destitute by the disaster, while Mrs. Ralph Worthington and Mrs. C. C. Groblewski coordinated donations of clothing made by the Red Cross.

The Diamond Jubilee celebration of 1941

By the 1940s, two rival energy sources, oil and natural gas, competed with anthracite coal, both of which were cheaper to extract and to ship. The anthracite industry received a temporary boost during the Second World War, but by the late 1950s, the industry was all but dead, with the exception of some strip mine operations that continued throughout the 1960s.

In September 1941, seventy-five years after Plymouth was incorporated as a borough, the town began a five-day celebration at Huber Field, including a pageant with the patriotic theme "America on Parade". Like many American towns, Plymouth had an ethnically diverse population, formed largely by the descendants of Irish, Welsh, Polish, Lithuanian and Slovak immigrants. Patriotism had an important place in the school curriculum, and the generation that was coming of age in 1941 had been educated to think of themselves as Americans first and foremost. After the Grand Finale of the pageant, according to the Jubilee's promotional pamphlet, the audience was "requested to join with the cast and with the Shawnee Choral Society in the singing of our National Anthem."

While the townspeople celebrated, war was raging in Europe and Asia. The ninth scene of the pageant, "Democracy Defended", was described in the Jubilee's pamphlet as a...

"... tableau of "Peace," following the [First] World War — a war which we fought to "end war". It is presented as a tribute to the brave men and courageous women who gave their all so that Democracy might survive, and in the hope that America may continue to remain honorably at Peace."

However, two months after the celebration, the Imperial Japanese Navy Air Service launched the attack on Pearl Harbor that drew America into war again. Many men and women from Plymouth served in the armed forces during the Second World War.

The writers of the Plymouth Diamond Jubilee pamphlet expressed optimism about the future. In the pageant's tenth scene, "American and Plymouth Today", the Diamond Jubilee Queen, Catherine Oldfield (in later years a Plymouth school teacher known as Catherine Bogdon), delivered her address of welcome "attended by boys and girls, young men and women of Plymouth and vicinity." The scene was described as "symbolic of modern youth, keeping step with the times, moving forward in step with current events. They are the men and women of tomorrow — the destiny of America we love will be in their hands." But owing to the decline of the local economy, many of the young men and women in attendance would have to move elsewhere in order to find work.

The Plymouth Diamond Jubilee celebration of 1941 occurred at an interesting time in the town's history. Still vital, and having survived a decade-long economic depression, the town looked forward to a return to its past prosperity. But unbeknown to the populace, a slow and steady decline would soon begin. Because of the collapse of the anthracite coal industry, the town's population, 15,507 in 1940, would decline to 5,951 by the year 2010.

Plymouth centennial celebration

In 1966, the residents of Plymouth celebrated the 100th anniversary of the incorporation of the Borough of Plymouth. The honorary chairman was the burgess, Edward F. Burns, and the general chairman was Angelo Grasso. The festivities began on June 11, 1966, with the Centennial Ball, held at the Gaylord Avenue Armory, during which Sandy Smith was chosen to be Miss Plymouth Centennial. A week of parades and parties culminated on June 18, Pioneer and Homecoming Day, with the Grand Parade. In between, the Centennial Committee presented at Huber Field "In Olde Shawnee", a fifteen-episode spectacle produced by John B. Rogers Productions of Fostoria, Ohio. Many residents, church groups, and civic and fraternal groups participated in the Centennial. During Centennial Week, many women donned old-time costumes from colonial days, and many men grew goatees, moustaches and "mutton-chop" side-burns, which by 1966 had been long out of fashion.

School consolidation 1966–1967

The first Plymouth High School graduating class received their diplomas in 1886, and the last graduating class received theirs in 1966. In the fall of 1966, Plymouth's school system merged with the Edwardsville and Larksville schools to become "Plymouth Area High School", one of three divisions in a consolidated school district called "Wyoming Valley West". In the fall of 1967, the Plymouth Area division combined with the other schools in the district to form a single high school in which freshmen and sophomores attended the Plymouth high school building, and juniors and seniors attended the Kingston high school building. Currently, the Wyoming Valley West High School building is located in Plymouth, just south of the site of the old Central High School, Plymouth's second high school building (built 1906 and demolished in 1980), and just north of Plymouth's third high school building (built 1913 and demolished in 2014) and Plymouth's fourth high school building (built 1925 and demolished in 1979).

Agnes Flood of 1972

Unlike earlier floods in the Wyoming Valley, most of which were caused by spring freshets, the 1972 flood was caused by bizarre and unusual weather patterns, including heavy rainfall that began in mid-April. In May almost 7.93 inches (201 mm) of rain fell, and in June another 7.55 inches (192 mm) fell, so that by late June the Susquehanna watershed was becoming saturated. By Wednesday, June 21, tropical storm Agnes arrived and was hovering over the Susquehanna watershed, dropping up to 12 inches (300 mm) of rain upstream in a single day. All around the valley, signs of trouble loomed: Main Street in Shavertown flooded, Harvey's Lake overflowed, Hunstville Dam was full, a bridge washed out in Towanda. But meanwhile, at Wilkes-Barre the river height was only 13.67 feet (4.17 m) above the low water level. Nevertheless, by 10:00 pm that night the river had quietly risen to 20.98 feet (6.39 m), causing Civil Defense Headquarters in the Luzerne County Courthouse to evacuate. Plymouth residents were ordered to leave their homes by 2:00 am.

By early morning Thursday, June 22, a widespread evacuation of the valley's flood zone was underway. At 6:00 am, water poured through a dike at Plymouth, and one hour later the river reached a height of 34.62 feet (10.55 m), rapidly approaching the 37-foot (11 m) limit of the valley's dike system. Countless volunteers passed sandbags from hand to hand in a futile effort to raise the dike level and hold back the water, until at 11:00 am, Civil Defense sounded the alarm calling a halt to all efforts on the east side. At 1:00 pm, water came over the dike at Forty Fort, after which work stopped on the west side as well.

Telephones no longer worked, electricity was no longer available and sewage systems were incapacitated. The absence of refrigeration led to a shortage of food. Martial law went into effect as rescue efforts got underway, and thousands of volunteers descended on the valley to assist with the rescue and then the clean-up. Meanwhile, the water rose higher and higher, finally peaking at 40.60 feet (12.37 m) at 7:00 pm, Saturday, June 24. At its greatest extent the flood was 5 miles (8.0 km) wide and 35 miles (56 km) long. Eventually, the water receded, leaving behind 25,000 homeless residents, and acres of devastation and mud.

== Burgesses (mayors) of Plymouth, Pennsylvania ==
=== Nineteenth-century burgesses (elected or appointed from 1866 to 1900) ===
- Elijah Catlin Wadhams was born at Plymouth on July 17, 1825, and was educated at Dickinson College and New York University, from which he graduated in 1847. He was elected Plymouth's first burgess in 1866, holding the office until 1869. Wadhams moved to Wilkes-Barre in 1873 and died there in 1889.
- Josiah William Eno was born in Simsbury, Connecticut, in 1820 and settled at Plymouth in 1855. He was one of the signers of the 1866 petition asking the courts to create Plymouth Borough, and was elected auditor in the first borough election the same year. Eno was elected Justice of the Peace in 1867, 1872, 1877 and 1882, and in this capacity served as coroner during the inquest into the Avondale Mine Disaster of 1869. He was elected Plymouth's second burgess in 1870 and re-elected in 1871. He became the fourth burgess in 1873 and was re-elected in 1874, holding office until the election held on February 16, 1875. Eno died in 1895 and was buried in Forty Fort Cemetery, Forty Fort, Pennsylvania.
- Charles H. Cool was born on January 4, 1839, at Beaver Meadows, Pennsylvania, the son of William Hoppa Cool (one of the owners of Plymouth's Gaylord Colliery) and his wife, Jane (Lockhart) Cool. Charles H. Cool appeared in the 1870 census at Plymouth, age 31, occupation "retired merchant." He became Plymouth's third burgess in 1872, but by 1880, had moved to West Pittston. In 1892, he ran as the Prohibitionist candidate for the United States Congress, Twelfth Congressional District, and lost the election to William Hines by a wide margin. Cool died in 1927 and was buried in the West Pittston Cemetery.
- Edward D. Barthe (a.k.a. Edmund D. Barthe) was born in Philadelphia on September 7, 1829, the son of Peter D. Barthe, a carpenter, and as a young man learned the printing trade. During the Civil War, he joined the Pennsylvania Volunteers, Twenty-Sixth Regiment, Company C, entering the service as a sergeant and leaving in 1862 by medical discharge. In 1867, he came to Wilkes-Barre and joined the staff of the Wilkes-Barre Record. For many years Barthe was the editor of the Plymouth Weekly Star newspaper. He was Plymouth's fifth burgess, elected on February 16, 1875. Barthe died on June 4, 1892, and is buried at Hillside Cemetery in Roslyn, Pennsylvania.
- Samuel Livingston French was born in Plymouth on September 28, 1839. He was Plymouth's sixth burgess, holding the office from 1876 to 1877, and was burgess during the 1877 labor riots. He was succeeded by John Y. Wren in 1878. However, in the election held Tuesday, February 18, 1879, Samuel L. French and the Citizens Party won every contested office, and French returned to office as Plymouth's eighth burgess. Samuel Livingston French died in 1923 and is buried in the Hollenback Cemetery, Wilkes-Barre, Pennsylvania.
- John Young Wren was born in Glasgow, Scotland on July 6, 1827, the son of William Wren and his wife, Jean McCreath. He was the first immigrant to be elected burgess. Wren fought on the side of the Union during the Civil War in Battery G, 2nd Artillery, 112th Regiment, and was mustered out with the rank of captain. In 1870, he lived at Plymouth and worked as a machinist, and about 1871, established an iron foundry located on the southwest corner of Cherry and Willow streets. The business suffered during the economic downturn of the mid-1870s and eventually failed. By 1887, he and his family lived at 54 Gaylord Avenue, supported by Wren's son Christopher, an insurance agent. For many years, Wren's daughter, Annie, was the art teacher at Plymouth's Central High School. Captain Wren was elected as Plymouth's seventh burgess in 1878 and served for one year. He died at Plymouth on June 14, 1899, and was buried at Edgehill Cemetery, West Nanticoke, Pennsylvania.
- Henry Coffin Magee was born on February 6, 1848, at Carroll Township, Perry County, Pennsylvania, where his father, Richard Magee, was a carpenter, cabinet maker, farmer, and undertaker. Magee graduated from the State Normal School, Bloomsburg, Pennsylvania, in 1871. He taught school and was the principal of the public schools of Plymouth from 1871 to 1876. In October 1875, he was admitted to the Luzerne County Bar and began to practice law. In 1880, he was an attorney living at 115 Main Street (old address system), next door to former burgess E. D. Barthe. That year he was elected burgess, the ninth to hold the office. In 1884, he was elected as a Republican to the Pennsylvania state legislature, serving between 1885 and 1886, but lost a re-election bid in 1886. In 1887, he boarded at the Parrish House (formerly the Elijah Wadhams Homestead). Magee died at Plymouth on April 27, 1888, and is buried in Union Cemetery, New Bloomfield, Pennsylvania
- Capt. John Dennis was born in 1810 at Bere Alston, Devon, England, and after emigrating to the United States in 1848 settled at Scranton, Pennsylvania. He lived in Plymouth from 1854 until 1856 during which time he was the contractor who sank the Patten shaft at Poke Hollow, near the corner of Washington Avenue and State Street, the first mine shaft sunk on the west side of Wyoming Valley. He returned to Plymouth about 1865, in time to sign the petition requesting the incorporation of Plymouth Borough. He was elected the tenth burgess in 1881 and served two terms. On May 7, 1883, at a meeting of the borough council, the "Bonds of Chief Burgess, John Dennis, [were] approved." He died at Parsons, Pennsylvania, on May 3, 1887, and was buried in the Shawnee Cemetery.
- Thomas Kerr was Plymouth's eleventh burgess. He was born in 1844 at Kilbirnie, Scotland, but migrated with his parents to the United States in 1849. Kerr grew up in Wilkes-Barre, and in January 1879, established a music store in Plymouth and later added a hardware store and real estate business. In 1887, his shop was located at 60 East Main Street, and advertised "Hardware, Stoves and Tinware, House-Furnishing Goods, also Sewing Machines, Music and Musical Instruments. Agent for Slate Roofing." In 1885, Kerr was elected burgess as a Republican with the backing of the town's Prohibitionist faction, and in 1887 was reelected. Kerr and his family attended Plymouth's Presbyterian church. In April 1895, when no longer burgess, Kerr acquired the Plymouth concession for Singer sewing machines. On May 4, 1895, he made news when he was seriously burned as the result of a gas explosion. Kerr died at Wilkes-Barre on March 15, 1911, and was buried in Oaklawn Cemetery, Hanover Township, Pennsylvania.
- Alfred J. Martin was born in 1839 at Cornwall, England, and migrated to the United States in 1869. Martin was born at the Cornwall county prison in Bodmin where his father was warden. He was Plymouth's twelfth burgess, elected in 1889, but probably began his term as burgess at the beginning of 1890. However, in May 1890 John C. F. Jenkins filed a petition in the Prothonotary's office to have Martin's citizenship papers annulled on the grounds that they were fraudulently obtained. The court decided in favor of Jenkins, and in June 1890, Judge Charles E. Rice declared Martin's naturalization to be null and void, forcing Martin from office. In 1908, Martin traveled back to England to visit siblings he hadn't seen in forty years. On October 6, 1913, Martin died at his home at 70 Academy Street, and was buried in the Shawnee Cemetery.
- Peter C. Roberts was born in Denbighshire, North Wales, in 1832 and came to the United States in 1864. In 1886, he lived at 59 Bank (later Girard) Street and was the sexton of the Welsh Baptist Church. In 1888, he was a Justice of the Peace, with offices at 45 West Main Street. He was Plymouth's thirteenth burgess, appointed by the courts in 1890 to replace Alfred J. Martin. At the same time, he was a Justice of the Peace and had offices at 30 Center Avenue. After his first term expired, Roberts was elected in February 1891 on the Citizens ticket, and then re-elected in 1892. In 1893, no longer burgess, he was a Justice of the Peace and a real estate agent. Roberts died on January 1, 1894, and was buried in the Shawnee Cemetery.
- Daniel B. Loderick was born in New Jersey about 1853. He was a harness maker, having learned the trade from James Laird of Wilkes-Barre, who later became his father-in-law. As a young man, "Dan" Loderick was a well-known baseball player in the position of catcher for Wilkes-Barre's "shoemaker nine". By 1880, Loderick was living in Plymouth, working at his trade. He was included in the 1887 City Directory: his shop was at 12 West Main Street and his residence at 40 Center Avenue. He served as Plymouth's High Constable from 1881 to 1884 and from 1889 to 1892. He was the borough's fourteenth burgess, and despite being a Democrat in an overwhelmingly Republican town, he was elected three times, serving from 1893 to 1897. Loderick died at his home on Gaylord Avenue of Bright's disease on February 1, 1898, at the age of 45, and was buried in the Shawnee Cemetery.
- Philip Walters was born in Wales in 1846, and migrated to the United States in 1869. He was nominated for burgess at the Republican convention held in Plymouth's Town Hall on January 18, 1897, edging out J.D. Williams and William Hoover. Walters was subsequently elected in the general election. He served until early 1900. Afterward, he served as a Justice of the Peace and worked as an insurance agent. Philip Walters died on June 17, 1916, and was buried in the Shawnee Cemetery on June 20, 1916. At the funeral, the pallbearers included former burgess W. D. Morris and future burgess Charles W. Honeywell.
- Elijah Cox (a naturalized citizen born in England in 1847) was elected Plymouth's sixteenth burgess on February 20, 1900, defeating Joseph Anderson, former burgess Thomas Kerr and future burgess Morgan Bevan. Cox served until 1903. He died at Plymouth on February 26, 1918, and is buried in the Shawnee Cemetery.

=== Twentieth century burgesses (elected or appointed from 1901 to 2000) ===
- John M. Thomas was born in Wales in 1840, and emigrated to the United States in 1870. He was elected as Plymouth's seventeenth burgess in the election held on February 17, 1903. Running as an independent, he defeated Alonzo Whitney, the Republican candidate and John T. Dwyer, the Democratic candidate. Thomas ran the River Breeze hotel for many years, but at the time of his election, worked as a miner at the Gaylord Colliery. On April 20, 1903, acting as burgess, Thomas shot and killed a mad dog on Main Street. He was tried for extortion in connection with a peddler's license that he had issued, a somewhat frivolous charge prosecuted by the peddler, and was acquitted on June 19, 1903. One of his last acts as burgess was to sign on February 13, 1906, an ordinance creating a regular police force in the borough. On January 25, 1913, when no longer burgess, Thomas shot and killed his son William, a veteran of the Spanish–American War. The shooting occurred on Main Street. Thomas was defended by H. L. Freeman and future governor Arthur H. James. He testified in his own defense, claimed the shooting was accidental and was acquitted by a jury on April 10.
- Morgan Bevan was born in Wales about 1850, the son of John M. and Elizabeth Bevan. In 1887, Bevan lived with his parents at 30 Ridge (now Cambria) Street. The father died in 1890. In 1900, Morgan Bevan was a bachelor, living with his mother on Cameron Street, working as a "medical salesman" selling patent medicines. He was elected burgess as a Republican on February 20, 1906, defeating Bernard Feenan, the independent candidate; John Jones, the Citizen's party candidate; and Stephen Cusma, the Workingman's party and Roosevelt party candidate. There was no candidate from the Democratic party. Bevan held office as the borough's eighteenth burgess from 1906 to 1909. He died in September 1924 and was buried in the Shawnee Cemetery.
- David D. Morris (also known as W.D. Morris) was born in Wales about 1847. He was said to have been a veteran of the Civil War. He lost the Republican primary on January 23, 1909, to Thomas Evans. There was so little interest in the Democratic primary that no record was kept, so Morris claimed to have won it in order to stay in the race. In the end, he ran on the Citizens ticket. His campaign was managed by future governor Arthur H. James and was considered to be unusually well run. In the general election held on February 16, Morris drew 1,317 votes to Evans' 989 and became Plymouth's nineteenth burgess. In February 1911, Burgess Morris ordered all of Plymouth's businesses to close during the funeral services for Rev. T. J. Donahoe, the rector of St. Vincent's church. On July 4, 1911, Morris presided over the grand opening of a playground at Cherry Street on the grounds of the Gaylord colliery, donated to the town by the Kingston Coal Co. In July 1912, Morris made national news when he arrested 30 hoboes who were loitering in Plymouth, and arranged for them to compete in a baseball game. The losers were arrested and taken to the town lock-up, whereas the winners were given a free dinner and made to leave town. On January 6, 1914, Morris submitted his final monthly report for December 1913 to the town council. Morris was buried in the Shawnee Cemetery with military honors on Memorial Day, 1919.
- Samuel U. Shaffer fought in the Civil War with the 143rd Pennsylvania Volunteers. He began his political career as borough clerk in 1879, when Samuel L. French was burgess. In 1887, he lived at 70 Bead Street, and ran a hardware store at 11 West Main Street. He announced his candidacy for burgess on July 9, 1913, and was elected on November 4, 1913, defeating Edward F. Burns by a vote of 1,101 to 573. Shaffer was sworn into office as the twentieth burgess on January 5, 1914, by his predecessor, David Morris, and held the office until January 1918. Shaffer died on March 19, 1929, and was buried in the Shawnee Cemetery.
- George E. Gwilliam was born in Pennsylvania in 1883, the son of Welsh-born parents George and Annie Gwilliam. The mother immigrated to the United States in 1854; the father in 1865. Relatively prosperous by 1900, the father owned an insurance agency, while his son, sixteen years old, had the luxury of being "at school" rather than at work in the coal mines. By 1908, George E. Gwilliam had followed his father into the insurance business. In the primary election on September 19, 1917, Gwilliam won both the Republican and Democratic nominations defeating William E. Smith, Thomas Close, William D. Morris and Gomer Reese. Gwilliam won the general election on November 6, 1917 and served as Plymouth's twenty-first burgess from 1918 to 1925. He was a fervent Prohibitionist and in August 1920 ordered the saloons of Plymouth to close on Sundays. After he retired as burgess, Gwilliam remained active in politics and in November 1927 was elected Luzerne County Recorder of Deeds. Gwilliam died in 1969 and was buried in the Forty Fort Cemetery, Forty Fort, Pennsylvania.
- William E. "Billy" Smith was born in Wales about 1880, and migrated to the United States with his parents in 1881. As a young man he lost a leg when he leaped from the balcony of the Plymouth Armory. From at least 1908 until 1915, he ran a pool hall and cigar store on Main Street. In 1917, Smith ran unsuccessfully for burgess. In 1922, he was a Justice of the Peace. In November 1925, Smith ran against John Boney, a Democrat, and Sephaniah Reese, an Independent candidate. Boney, considered a Republican running as a Democrat, did not really campaign and on November 3, 1925, Smith won by a large margin. In October 1933, at the end of his second term, Smith fell ill and Joseph Bialogowicz, a borough council member, acted as burgess. Smith died on October 21, 1933, and for a short time there was a move to appoint his widow burgess (she would have become Plymouth's first female burgess) and give her the Democratic and Republican nominations in the November general election, but the appointment and the nominations were given to Charles W. Honeywell instead. To his credit, Honeywell gave his salary for the remainder of Smith's term to Smith's wife. Smith is buried in the Fern Knoll Cemetery, Dallas, Pennsylvania.
- Charles W. Honeywell was born about 1858, probably in Exeter Township, Pennsylvania, the son of Daniel D. and Julia Ann Honeywell. In 1860, the father was a farmer. By 1880, the family lived at Plymouth where the father worked as a shoemaker, and Charles, now 22, worked in a brickyard. In 1887, Honeywell was employed as a manager for J.E. Coursen, owner of a general store, but also employed by the Plymouth Police Department. By 1891, Honeywell was a constable, tax collector and insurance agent with offices at 34 East Main Street. After a long career as a Justice of the Peace, Honeywell became burgess in October 1933 upon the death of William E. Smith. Smith had won both the Democratic and Republican nominations, and was replaced by Honeywell on both tickets after his death, by agreement of both parties. Owing to poor health, Honeywell served one term and resigned as burgess in December 1937. Upon his resignation, he was replaced by Samuel J. Brokenshire. Honeywell died on December 28, 1937, and is buried in Hanover Green Cemetery, Hanover Township, Pennsylvania.
- Samuel John Brokenshire was the last of Plymouth's Cornish-Welsh-born burgesses. He was born at Redruth, Cornwall, England in 1872, the son of Samuel Brokenshire and his wife, Wilmot Opie, and migrated to the United States sometime between 1874 and 1885. The family settled on Palmer Street near the corner of Jeanette Street, a popular neighborhood for newly arrived Welsh and English immigrants. Samuel Brokenshire Sr. died at Plymouth on July 1, 1888, age 46. In 1891, Samuel Jr. was employed as a driver, boarding with his mother. In 1900, he lived with his mother and worked as a day laborer. After serving as constable for five years, on June 3, 1907, he was named Plymouth's High Constable. On his 1918 draft registration card, Brokenshire gave his occupation as "high constable" and a note is appended: "right arm amputated below elbow." Brokenshire never married, and from 1910 to 1930, he boarded with the Andrew Hendershot family on Shawnee Avenue. In the 1910 census, his occupation was given as a constable. In May 1912 he rescued a child from being run over by a street car. In 1921, Brokenshire made local news when he was called for jury duty. He claimed that his only vacation each year was to attend the World Series and was dismissed. On May 1, 1937, Brokenshire announced his candidacy for burgess, but Charles W. Honeywell won the election. However, Brokenshire was appointed burgess in December 1937 when Honeywell resigned. In July 1939, Brokenshire sent the Borough police to stop Elizabeth Gurley Flynn, a union organizer for the Industrial Workers of the World and a well-known member of the American Communist Party, from giving a speech in Plymouth. In the general election held on November 4, 1941, Brokenshire, running as a Republican, defeated his Democratic opponent (Edward "Starky" Stugenski) by a vote of 3,490 to 2,406. It was Brokenshire's second term. He was elected for a third term in November 1945. In January 1954, Brokenshire began his fifth term as burgess at the age of 82, Pennsylvania's oldest chief magistrate. Brokenshire died in April 1956 and was buried in Mount Greenwood Cemetery, Trucksville, Pennsylvania.
- Horace C. Cooper was born at Franklin Township, Pennsylvania in 1883, the son of Joshua Cooper, a house builder who lived on Girard Avenue. In 1930, Horace Cooper lived at 78 Wadhams Street, engaged in the same occupation as his father. Cooper was appointed to be Plymouth's twenty-fifth burgess after the death of Samuel Brokenshire, but failed to win election on his own account in 1957. Cooper died in 1965 and was buried in the Fern Knoll Cemetery, Dallas, Pennsylvania.
- Joseph J. Braja was born in Plymouth on June 9, 1915, the son of Jacob Braja and his wife, Hedwig Gilica. He served during the Second World War in the Third Armored Division under the command of General George Patton and fought in the Battle of the Bulge. He attained the rank of staff sergeant, and was awarded the Silver Star (1945) and the Purple Heart medals. In the 1957 race for burgess, seven men vied in the Republican primary for the office, including incumbent Horace Cooper, who was defeated by Donald E. Hosey. Nevertheless, on November 5, Braja, backed by the Democratic boss Ben Mazur, defeated Hosey by 97 votes to become the first member of the Democratic Party to be elected burgess. He was sworn in on February 6, 1958, and served until 1962. When not serving as burgess, he was an employee of the Luzerne County Road and Bridge Department. Braja died on May 23, 2003, and was buried in St. Mary's Cemetery, Plymouth Township, Pennsylvania.
- Donald E. Hosey was born on May 13, 1922, the son of Plymouth political leader and council member I. J. Hosey and his wife, Mary (Mangan) Hosey. Running as a Republican, Hosey was elected Plymouth's twenty-seventh burgess in 1962, and served until 1966. He was the borough's first ethnically Irish burgess. Hosey died on December 28, 1990, and was buried in St. Mary's Cemetery, Hanover Township, Pennsylvania.
- Edward F. Burns was born on August 5, 1922, the son of Edward and Rose Burns, and grew up on Plymouth's Church Street. His father was a coal miner. Burns graduated from St. Vincent's High School (1940) and served during the Second World War in the Army Air Forces. He graduated from King's College, Wilkes-Barre, in 1951, and after briefly teaching school in New Jersey, returned to Plymouth, where he worked as a bank employee for many years. Burns was Plymouth's twenty-eighth burgess. He was also Plymouth's longest-serving burgess, first elected to the position in January 1966 and holding it through consecutive elections until his death on January 19, 1994. As burgess, he presided over Plymouth's Centennial celebration in 1966, and oversaw the borough's restoration efforts in the aftermath of the 1972 Agnes Flood. Burns's love of his hometown and his relish for the job were evident to all who knew him, and, in return, he was much beloved by his constituents. Burns was buried in St. Vincent's Cemetery, Larksville, Pennsylvania.
- Stanley T. Petrosky was born about 1940, the son of Stanley A. Petrosky and his wife, Margaret Harnen. He attended Plymouth's St. Vincent High School, where he was a member of coach Joe Evan's legendary 1957 basketball team, which won the Pennsylvania state championship. Petrosky graduated from Plymouth High School (1958) and King's College, Wilkes-Barre. He was elected to the borough council in 1989, and was appointed burgess in 1994 after the death of Edward F. Burns. Petrosky died in February 2001 and was buried in St. Mary's Cemetery, Plymouth Township, Pennsylvania.

=== Twenty-first century burgesses (elected or appointed in 2001 and after) ===
- Dorothy Novak Petrosky was Plymouth's thirtieth burgess. A lifetime resident of Plymouth and a graduate of Plymouth High School (Class of 1957), she was married for 36 years to Burgess Stanley T. Petrosky, and was appointed to replace him after his death in February 2001. Petrosky was elected in her own right in the general election that same year and became the first woman to hold the office of burgess in Plymouth. However, in the 2017 election, she was defeated by Thomas McTague.
- Thomas F. McTague was a 1958 graduate of Plymouth High School, a former assistant to Mayor Edward F. Burns, and a former councilman from 1994 to 2014. McTague won the Democratic primary on May 16, 2017, defeating the incumbent, Dorothy Petrosky. No Republican was on the ballot. McTague ran unopposed in the general election held on November 7, 2017, and was inaugurated as Plymouth's thirty-first burgess in January 2018. McTague died in office on September 27, 2019.
- Frank J. Coughlin, Jr. was formerly the president of the borough council. He was appointed Plymouth's thirty-second burgess in October 2019 to complete the term of the previous burgess, Thomas F. McTague, which ended in January 2022. In the Luzerne County primary election held May 18, 2021, Coughlin won both the Democratic and Republican nominations. In the general election held November 21, 2021, Coughlin, essentially unopposed, was elected to a four-year term with 97.8% of the vote.

== See also ==
- Plymouth, Pennsylvania
- Coal mining in Plymouth, Pennsylvania
- Architecture of Plymouth, Pennsylvania
- Shawnee Cemetery, Plymouth, Pennsylvania
