= Plymouth, Pennsylvania =

Borough in Pennsylvania, US

- Borough
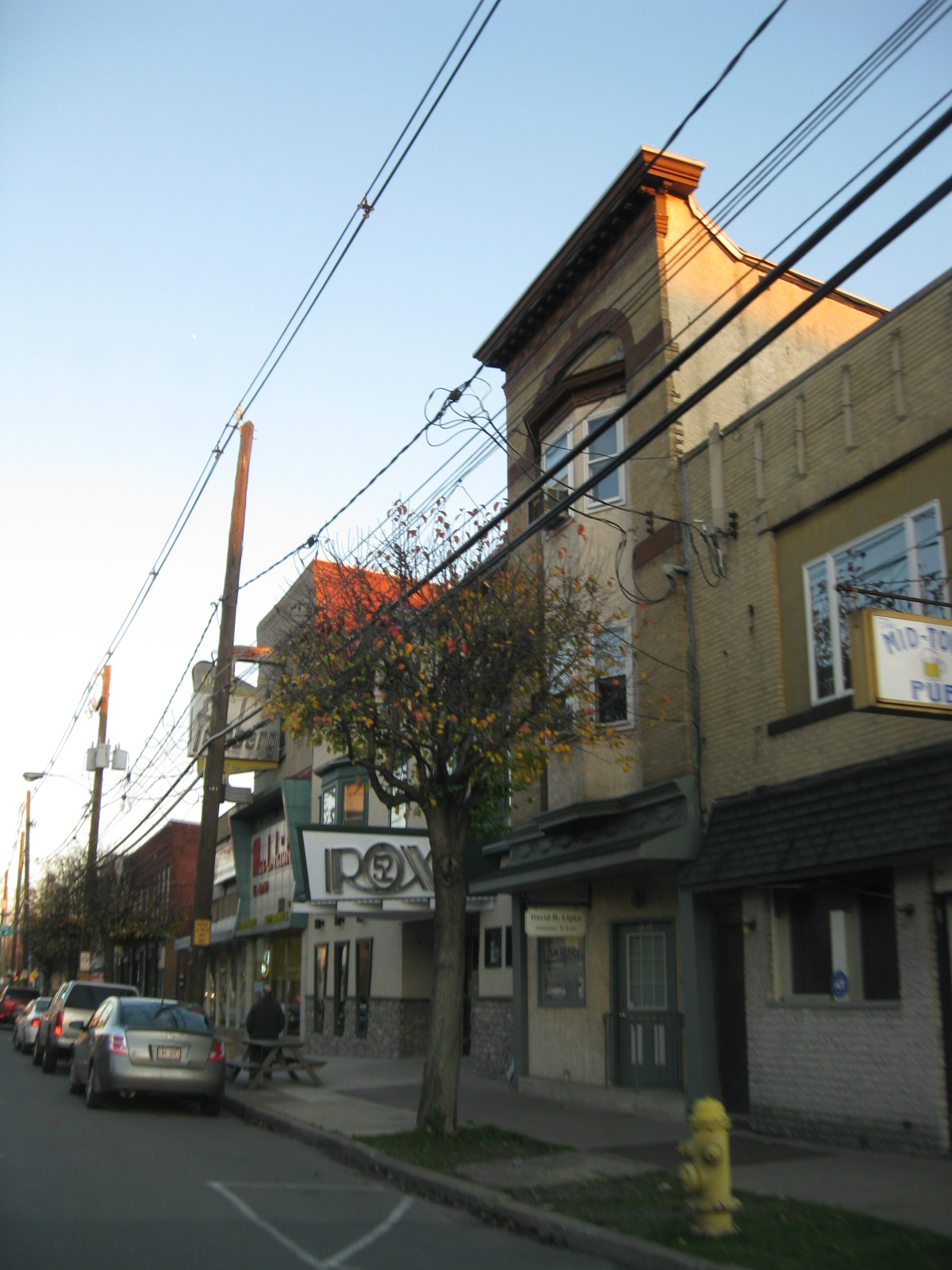
- Downtown Plymouth

- Location of Plymouth in Luzerne County, Pennsylvania

- Location within Pennsylvania Location within the United States
- Coordinates: 41°14′31″N 75°56′53″W
- Country: United States
- State: Pennsylvania
- County: Luzerne
- Settled: 1769
- Incorporated: 1866

Government
  - Type: Borough Council
  - Mayor: Frank Coughlin

Area
  - Total: 1.17 sq mi (3.03 km^{2})
  - Land: 1.07 sq mi (2.78 km^{2})
  - Water: 0.097 sq mi (0.25 km^{2})

Population (2020)
  - Total: 5,763
  - Density: 5,370.4/sq mi (2,073.51/km^{2})
- Time zone: UTC−5 (Eastern (EST))
  - Summer (DST): UTC−4 (EDT)
- Zip code: 18651
- Area code: 570
- FIPS code: 42-61648
- Website: plymouthboroughpa.gov//

Plymouth is a borough in Luzerne County, Pennsylvania, United States, located 4 miles (6 km) west of Wilkes-Barre, along the Susquehanna River. The population was 5,763 as of the 2020 census.

== History ==
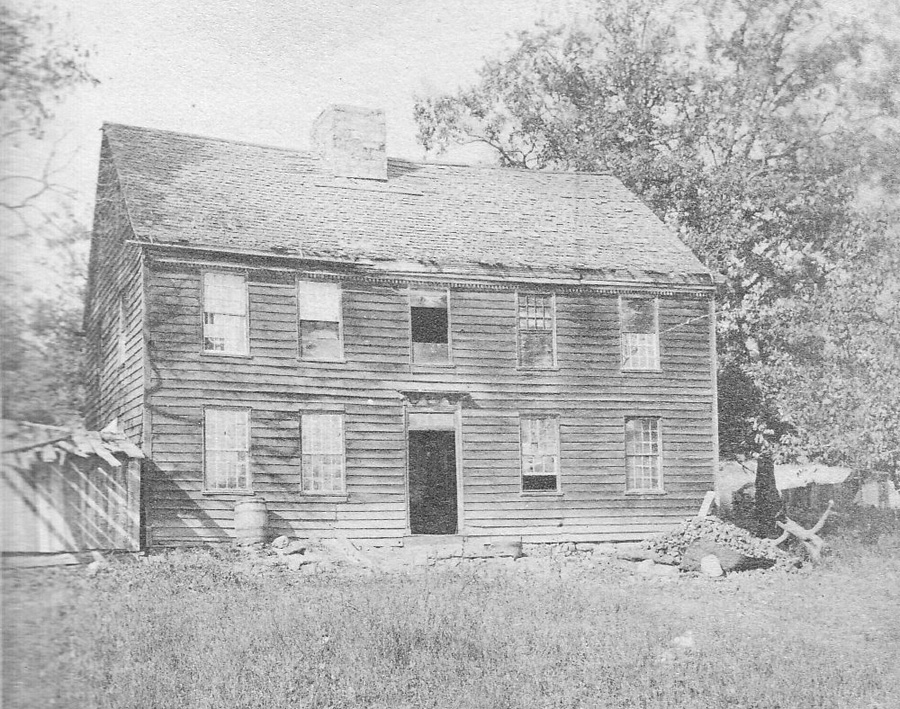
The Ransom House, which once stood near the corner of Main St. and Coal St., was an example of New England domestic architecture brought to Plymouth by Connecticut settlers.

Plymouth was first settled in 1769 by New Englanders under the Susquehanna Company of Connecticut. In its earliest days, Plymouth was a quiet, agricultural community resembling a traditional New England village. However, its territory was a central battleground for the Pennamite-Yankee Wars, a series of armed land clashes between Connecticut and Pennsylvania settlers. The dispute was finally resolved in favor of Pennsylvania through the Compromise Act of 1799, which permanently secured landowners' properties under Pennsylvania's jurisdiction.

The town's trajectory shifted dramatically with the discovery of anthracite coal, a clean-burning fuel laying in massive reserves beneath the surface. In 1807, brothers Abijah and John Smith made the town's first commercial shipment of coal down the Susquehanna River on wooden arks. By the 1850s, agriculture gave way to a massive industrial mining boom. The arrival of the railroad in 1857 accelerated this transformation, turning Plymouth into a thriving industrial hub that attracted diverse immigrant populations. This ultimately led to it separating from Plymouth Township and becoming a borough in 1866. The first borough election was held in May 1866, and Elijah C. Wadhams was elected as the borough's first burgess.

At its peak in 1910, Plymouth boasted a population of nearly 17,000 residents. In addition to extensive mining operations, local factories manufactured items like miners' drilling tools, silk hosiery, and lumber products. Like most of the region, the borough faced safety crises, notably the tragic 1869 Avondale Mine Disaster in nearby Plymouth Township, which claimed 110 lives and catalyzed the state's first mine inspection laws. Following the mid-20th-century decline of the anthracite industry, Plymouth adapted from a roaring coal town into a quiet, residentially focused historic borough.

=== Architecture ===
At the beginning of the 19th century, Plymouth's primary industry was agriculture, and many of its residents were the descendants of the Connecticut Yankees who first settled the town. Its early architecture resembled that of a small New England village.

Large quantities of anthracite coal lay below the surface at various depths, and by the 1850s, coal mining had become the town's primary occupation, attracting a more diverse population. After the arrival of the railroad in 1857, the town's architecture became more typical of a growing industrial center.

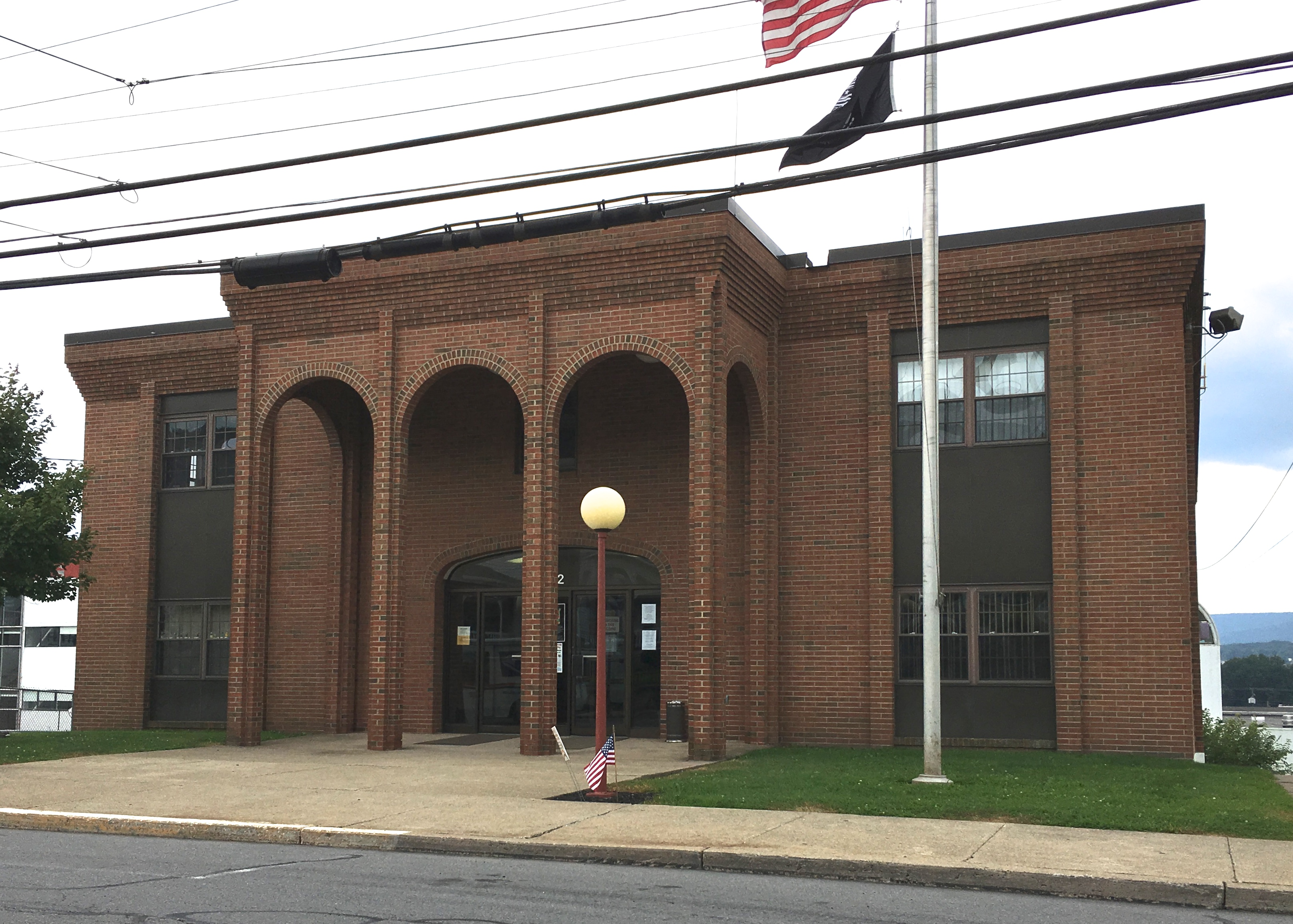
Plymouth Municipal Building

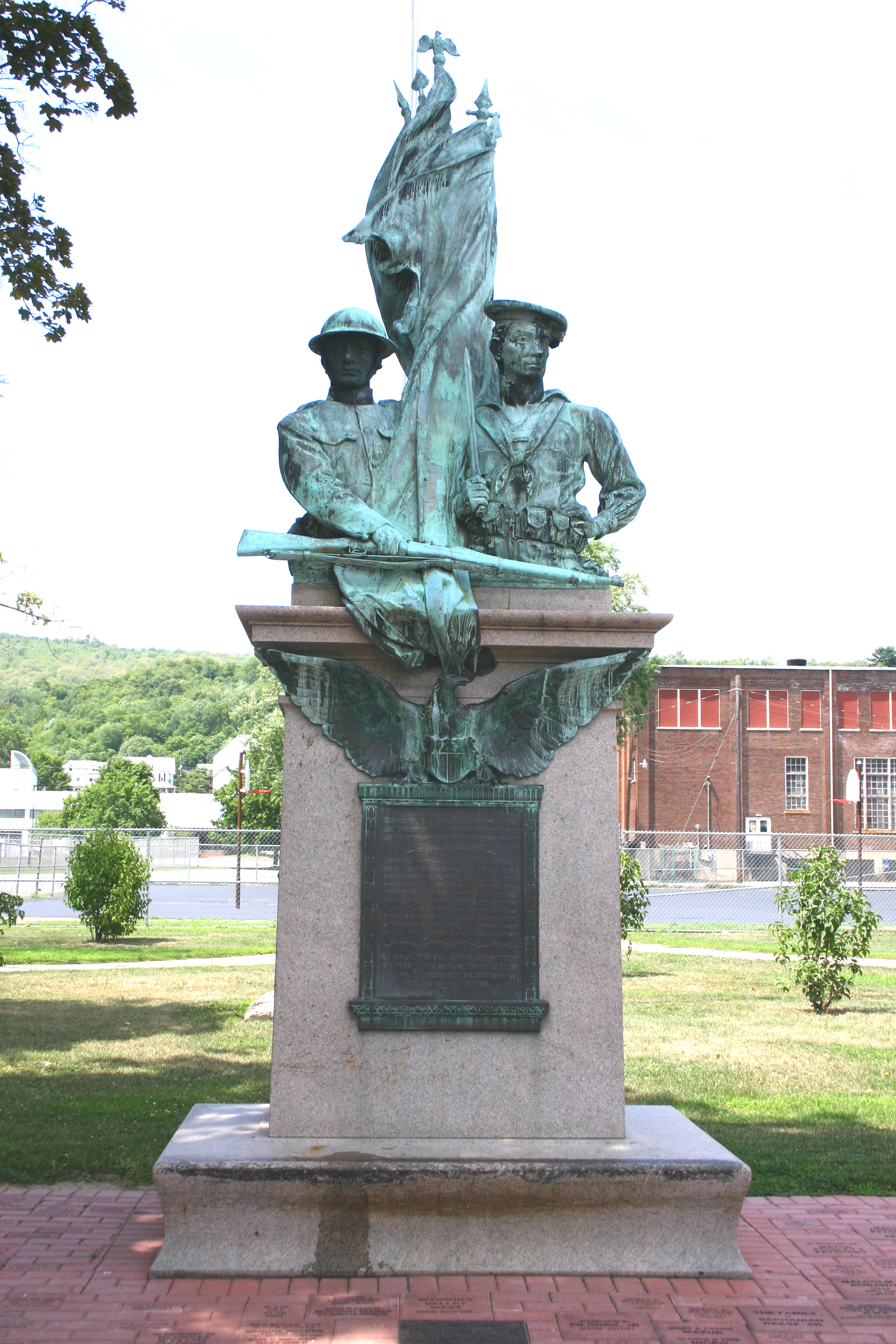
Soldiers and Sailors Monument (dedicated 1920)

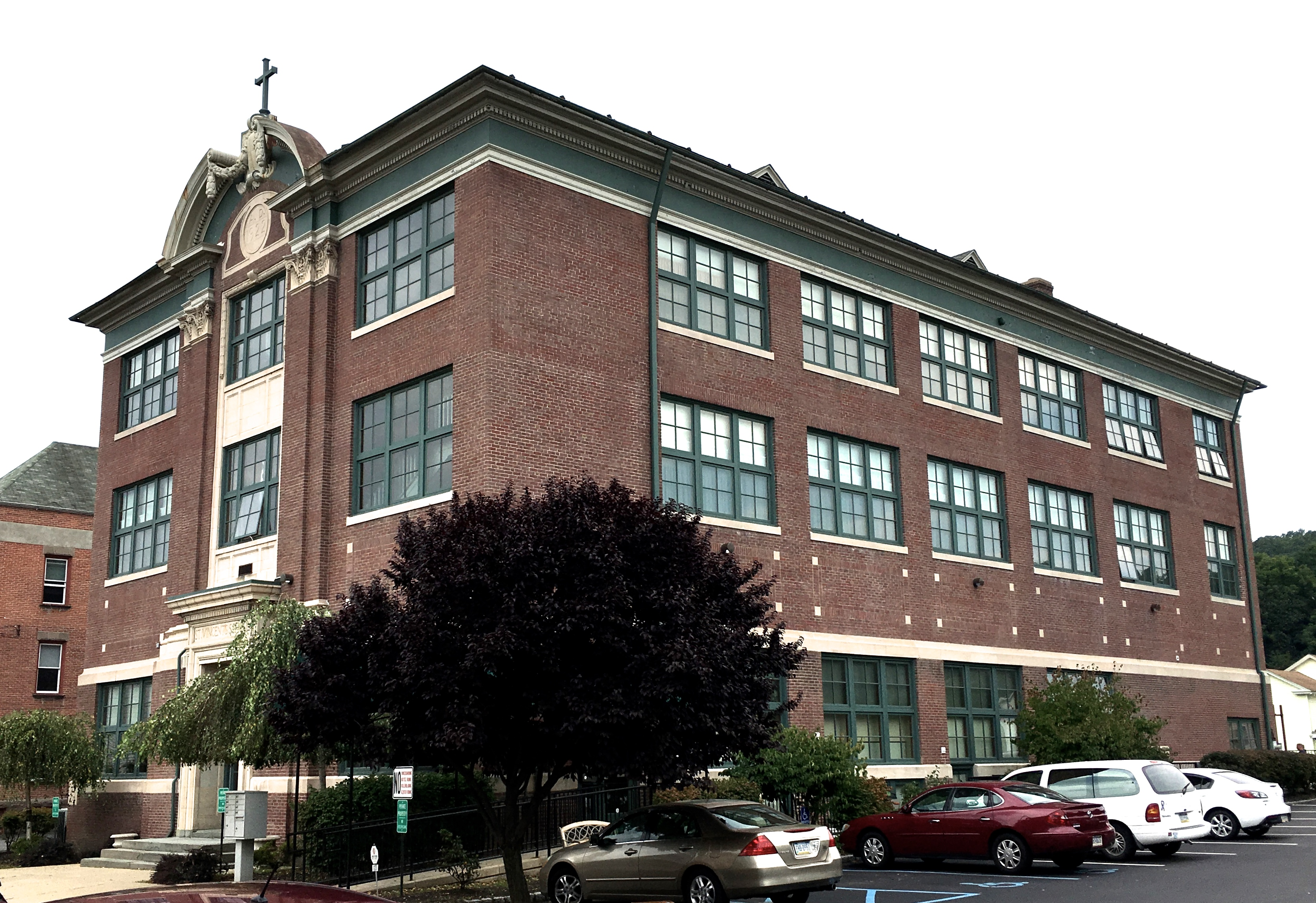
St. Vincent's School in Plymouth

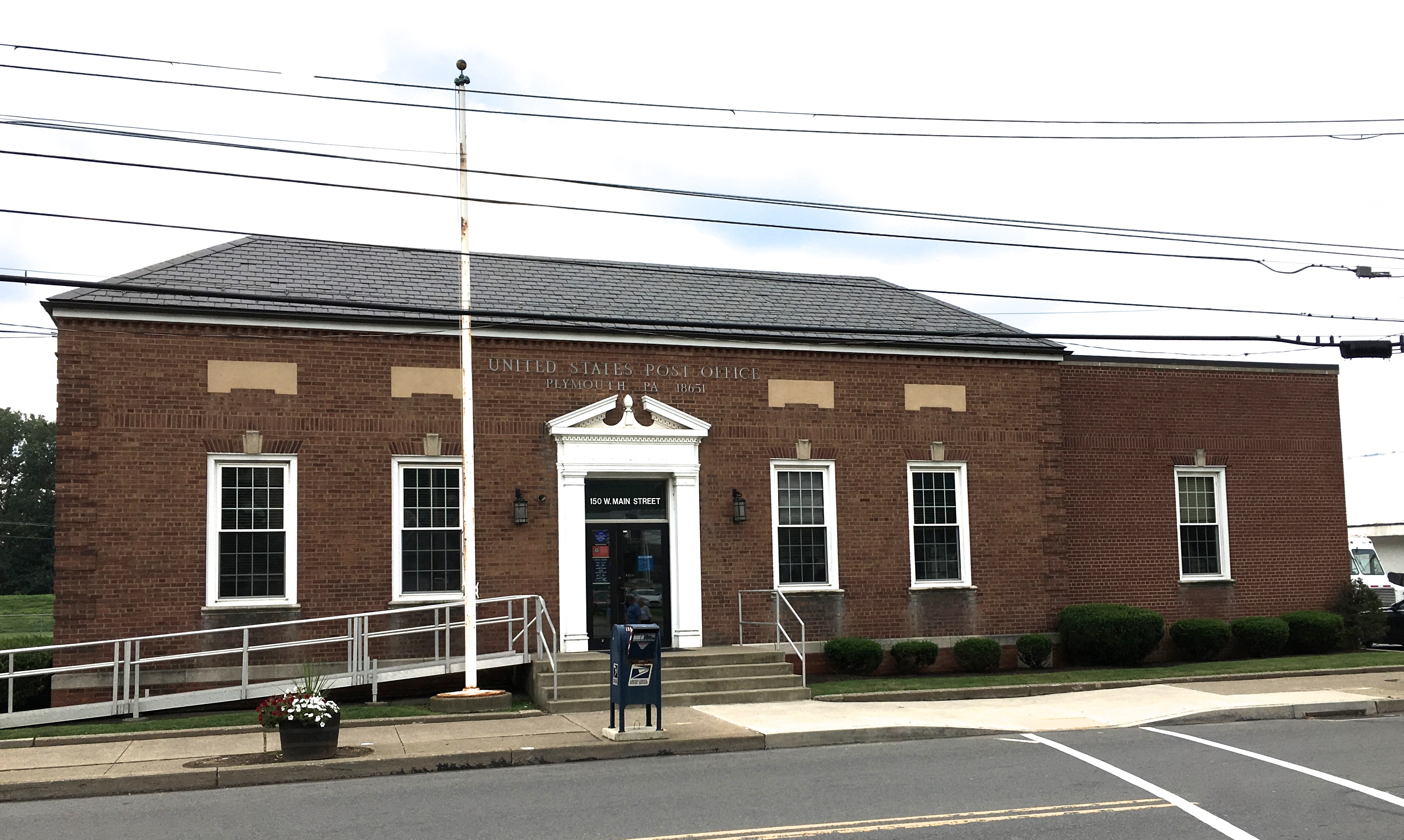
Plymouth Post Office

== Geography ==
Plymouth is situated along the Susquehanna River in Luzerne County. According to the United States Census Bureau, the borough has a total area of 1.2 square miles (3.1 km^{2}), of which 1.1 square miles (2.8 km^{2}) is land and 0.08 square miles (0.2 km^{2}), or 7.31%, is water. U.S. Route 11 runs directly through the borough.

== Demographics ==
Historical population
Census	Pop.	Note	%±
1870	2,684		—
1880	6,065		126.0%
1890	9,344		54.1%
1900	13,649		46.1%
1910	16,996		24.5%
1920	16,500		−2.9%
1930	16,543		0.3%
1940	15,507		−6.3%
1950	13,021		−16.0%
1960	10,401		−20.1%
1970	9,536		−8.3%
1980	7,605		−20.2%
1990	7,134		−6.2%
2000	6,507		−8.8%
2010	5,951		−8.5%
2020	5,763		−3.2%

=== 2020 demographics ===
At the 2020 census, Plymouth had a population of 5,763.

=== 2010 demographics ===
At the 2010 census, Plymouth had a population of 5,951. The reported racial and ethnic origin of the population was 90.6% White, 4.3% African American, 0.2% Native American, 0.5% Asian, 0.1% from other races, 2.0% reporting two or more races, and 3.3% Hispanic or Latino.

=== 2000 demographics ===
As of the census of 2000, Plymouth had a population of 6,507. The reported racial and ethnic origin of the population was 98.4% White, 0.8% African American, 0.2% Native American, 0.1% Asian, 0.2% from other races, and 0.3% from two or more races. Hispanic or Latino of any race were 0.8% of the population. The median income for a household in the borough was $27,379.

== Education ==
It is in the Wyoming Valley West School District.

== Notable people ==
- Ike Borsavage (1924–2014), born in Plymouth; professional basketball player.
- Abe Cohen (1933–2001), born in Plymouth; professional football player.
- Stanley Woodward Davenport (1861–1921), born and lived in Plymouth; lawyer and Democratic congressman.
- Mark Duda (born 1961), born in Plymouth; professional football player.
- Harry Livingston French (1871–1928), born in Plymouth; grew up there; the architect of Plymouth’s Central School.
- Gwilym Gwent (1834–1891), Welsh-born composer; lived and worked in Plymouth after immigrating.
- Jimmy Harnen (born 1963), grew up in Plymouth; singer and songwriter.
- Gov. Arthur Horace James (1883–1973), Plymouth native son; lawyer, judge, governor of Pennsylvania.
- Benjamin James (1912–2015), born in Plymouth; college football coach.
- Col. Benjamin Washington Johnson (1924–1992), Plymouth high school class of 1933; record-breaking collegiate sprinter.
- Milton Jones (1894–1932), born in Plymouth; race car driver.
- Joe Katchik (1931–2014), born in Plymouth; Plymouth high school class of 1949; professional football player.
- David Kautter (born ca 1948), Plymouth high school class of 1966; lawyer and tax policy advisor.
- John Kraynak (1894–1961), born in Plymouth; one of many pugilists who adopted the alias “K.O. Sweeney.”
- Walter J. Kozloski (1935–1979), born in Plymouth; New Jersey politician.
- Frank Martz Sr. (1885–1936), born in Plymouth; businessman.
- John E. Mazur (1930–2013), born in Plymouth; Plymouth high school class of 1948; professional football player.
- John G. Mellus (1917–2005), born in Plymouth; professional football player.
- Thomas Byron Miller (1896–1976), born in Plymouth; lawyer, Republican congressman.
- David P. Reese Jr. (1905–1962), born in Plymouth, state representative.
- George Washington Shonk (1850–1900), born in Plymouth; lawyer and Republican congressman.
- Herbert B. Shonk (1881–1930), born in Plymouth; New York politician.
- James Francis Stanley (1887–1947), born in Plymouth; professional baseball player.
- Thomas W. Templeton (1867–1935), born in Plymouth; florist, Republican congressman.
- Frank Comerford Walker (1886–1959), born in Plymouth; lawyer, United States Postmaster General.
- Thomas Joseph Walker (1877–1945), born in Plymouth; lawyer, and United States Customs Court judge.
- Hendrick Bradley Wright (1808–1881), born in Plymouth; lawyer, Democratic congressman and author; his history of Plymouth was published in 1873.

== See also ==
- History of Plymouth, Pennsylvania
- Coal mining in Plymouth, Pennsylvania
- Architecture of Plymouth, Pennsylvania
- Pennamite–Yankee War
- Shawnee Cemetery, Plymouth, Pennsylvania
