= Rhandirmwyn =

Village in Carmarthenshire, Wales

Coordinates: 52.0784°N 3.7748°W

Rhandirmwyn: Welsh: Rhandir-mwyn
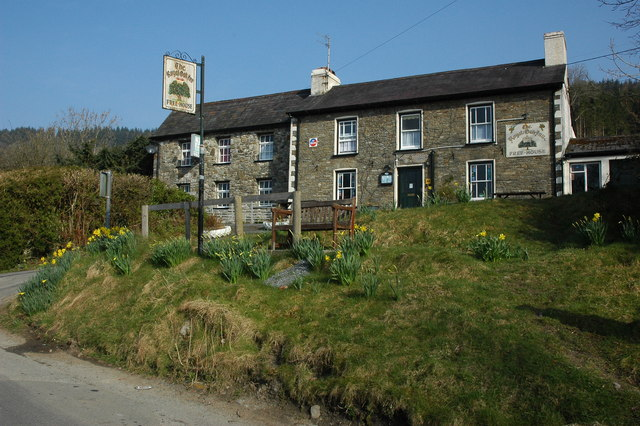
- The Royal Oak Inn in the centre of Rhandirmwyn

- Location within Carmarthenshire
- OS grid reference: SN7838843758
- Community: Llanfair-ar-y-bryn
- Principal area: Carmarthenshire
- Preserved county: Dyfed
- Country: Wales
- Sovereign state: United Kingdom
- Post town: Llandovery
- Postcode district: SA20
- Dialling code: 01550
- Police: Dyfed-Powys
- Fire: Mid and West Wales
- Ambulance: Welsh
- UK Parliament: Caerfyrddin
- Senedd Cymru – Welsh Parliament: Carmarthen East and Dinefwr

Rhandirmwyn (or Rhandir-mwyn) is a small village in the north east of Carmarthenshire, Wales. Located in the upper Towy valley, 3 km north of Cilycwm village, it extends on both sides of the river. It lies in the parish of Llanfair-ar-y-bryn.

The Nantymwyn Lead Mine, above the village, was in existence since Roman times, and closed in 1932. Tourism is now the main industry. The surrounding Upper Town Valley is filled with ancient sites from the Neolithic era, Iron Age, and Bronze Age.

Sarn Ddu is a Roman road that runs along the eastern edge of the valley. Twm Siôn Cati was associated with Rhandirmwyn, although he was born in Tregaron. A cave at the Dinas Hill was one of his hideouts.

The village is also the location of Coleg Elidyr.

The Pwllpriddog Oak stands nearby.

== Notable people ==
- Morgan B. Williams (1831–1903), a coal industry executive and US politician; Republican member of the U.S. House of Representatives for Pennsylvania from 1897 to 1899. He was born in Rhandir-Mwyn.
