= George W. Shonk =

American politician (1850–1900)

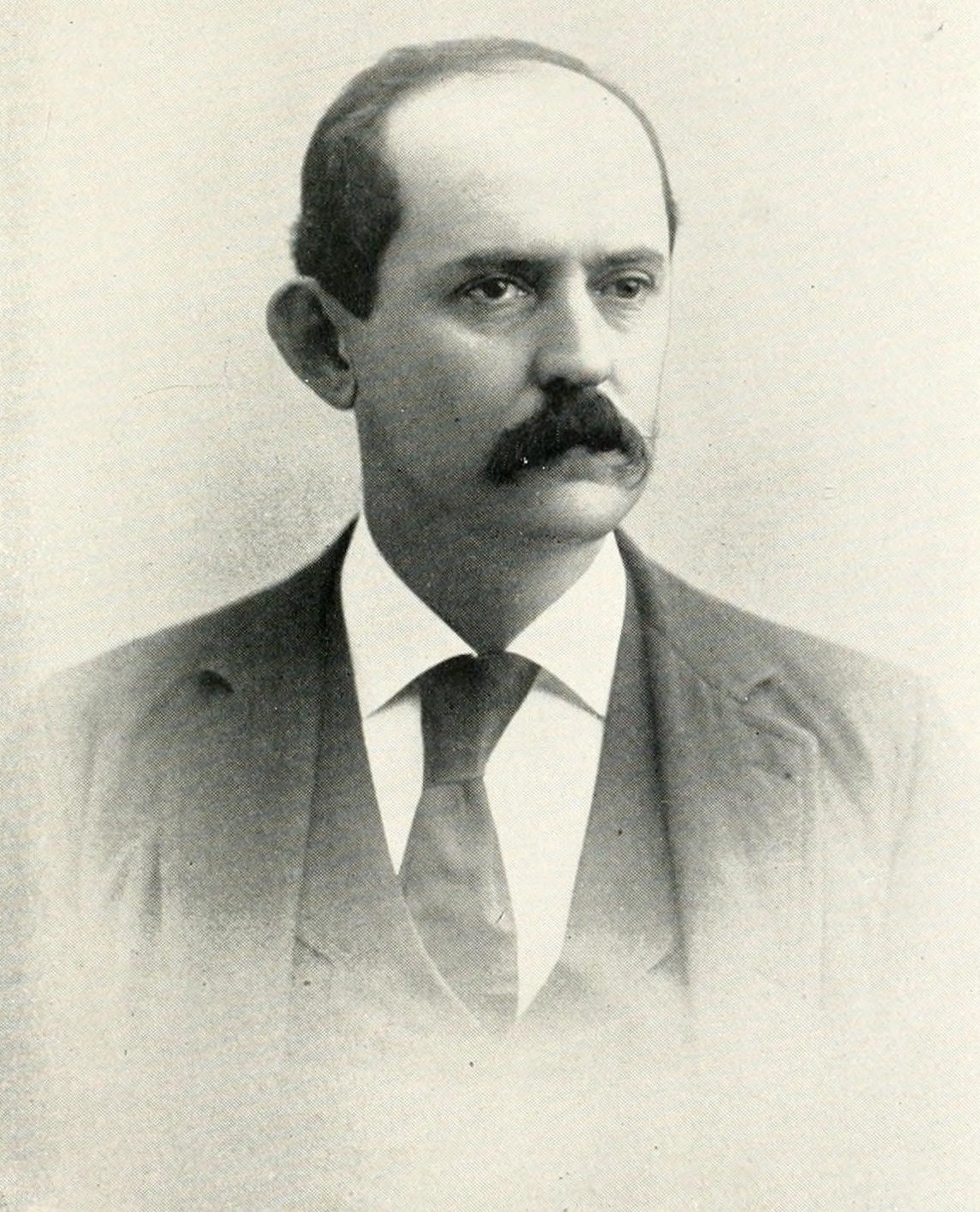
George W. Shonk, about 1893.

George Washington Shonk (April 26, 1850 – August 14, 1900) was a Republican member of the U.S. House of Representatives from Pennsylvania.

== Formative years and family ==
Born in Plymouth, Pennsylvania, on April 26, 1850, the son of John Jenks Shonk, a mine operator, and his wife, Amanda Davenport, George Shonk attended Plymouth's public schools, and prepared for college at Wyoming Seminary in Kingston, Pennsylvania. In 1873, he graduated from Wesleyan University in Middletown, Connecticut. In 1876, after studying law, he was admitted to the bar of Luzerne County, Pennsylvania, after which he practiced law in Wilkes-Barre, Pennsylvania.

Shonk married Ida Elizabeth Klotz (1856–1911) on August 11, 1880. They were the parents of New York Assemblyman Herbert B. Shonk (1881–1930), and Emily Weaver Shonk (1885–1974).

== Public service and later years ==
Shonk was elected as a Republican to the Fifty-second Congress. He declined to be a candidate for renomination in 1892, and resumed the practice of his profession in Wilkes-Barre.

He also became interested in coal mining in Pennsylvania.

== Death and interment ==
Shonk died on a business trip to Washington, D.C., on August 14, 1900. He was buried in the Shawnee Cemetery, Plymouth, Pennsylvania.

== Sources ==
- United States Congress. "George W. Shonk (id: S000376)". Biographical Directory of the United States Congress.
- The Political Graveyard

U.S. House of Representatives
Preceded by Edwin S. Osborne	Member of the U.S. House of Representatives from Pennsylvania's 12th congressional district 1891–1893	Succeeded by William H. Hines
