= Edwards River =

Edwards River may refer to:

- Edwards River (Mid Canterbury), a tributary of the Bealey River in New Zealand
- Edwards River (North Canterbury), a tributary of the (northern) Waiau River in New Zealand
- Edwards River (Illinois), United States

== See also ==
- Edwards (disambiguation)
- Edward River (disambiguation)
