= Thomas Podmore =

American architect

Thomas Podmore (1859–1948) was a British-born American architect. In addition to his lengthy architectural career as an architect, Podmore is noteworthy for his experiments with the fabrication of concrete products.

== Early life ==
Thomas Podmore was born at Cherrington, Shropshire, England in 1859, the son of a farmer, and was baptized at the nearby village of Tibberton on March 23, 1859. In 1881, he was living on St. Ann Street in Stoke-upon-Trent, Staffordshire, employed as an "architect's assistant."

== Career in America ==
Podmore emigrated to the United States about 1883, worked for a few years in New York, then moved to Wilkes-Barre, Pennsylvania. There, in 1886, he joined forces with Albert Hamilton Kipp to form the architecture firm Kipp & Podmore. The firm dissolved by mutual consent at the end of 1891.

In 1903, Podmore received a patent for a "machine for molding concrete blocks," and in 1907 founded the Podmore Concrete Co., for the manufacture of concrete blocks by a method of Podmore's own devising.

Podmore retired in 1928 after the completion of his last building, Sprague Memorial Hall, in Kingston, Pennsylvania. He died in 1948.

== Principal architectural works ==
- Nelson Memorial Hall, Wyoming Seminary, Kingston, Pennsylvania, built in 1887 — as Kipp & Podmore.
- Methodist Episcopal Church, Dallas, Pennsylvania, completed in 1889 — as Kipp & Podmore.
- Armory, Gaylord Avenue, Plymouth, Pennsylvania, built in 1891 — as Kipp & Podmore.
- State Street School, Nanticoke, Pennsylvania, built in 1891 — as Kipp & Podmore.
- St. Peter's Episcopal Church, Plymouth, Pennsylvania, built in 1893.
- Wyoming Valley Country Club, Wilkes-Barre, Pennsylvania, built 1896.
- W. G. Eno Residence, Ross Street, Wilkes-Barre, Pennsylvania, built 1899.
- J. B. Woodward Residence, Northampton Street, Wilkes-Barre, Pennsylvania, built 1899.
- Town Hall, Edwardsville, Pennsylvania, built 1899.
- Wyoming Valley Country Club Enlargement, Wilkes-Barre, Pennsylvania, built 1903.
- Grace English Lutheran Church, 500 S. Franklin St, Wilkes-Barre, Pennsylvania, dedicated May 1911.
- R. R. M. Carpenter Residence, Wilmington Delaware, built in 1911.
- Wilkes-Barre Contagious Hospital, East Division Street, Wilkes-Barre, Pennsylvania, completed 1918.
- Walter S. Carpenter Jr. Residence, Wilmington, Delaware, completed in 1918.
- Nesbitt Memorial Athletic Field, Wyoming Seminary, Kingston, Pennsylvania, dedicated October 1922.
- Sprague Hall, Wyoming Seminary, Kingston, Pennsylvania, completed in 1928.

== Gallery ==
Nelson Memorial Hall, Wyoming Seminary, Kingston, Pennsylvania, completed 1887.

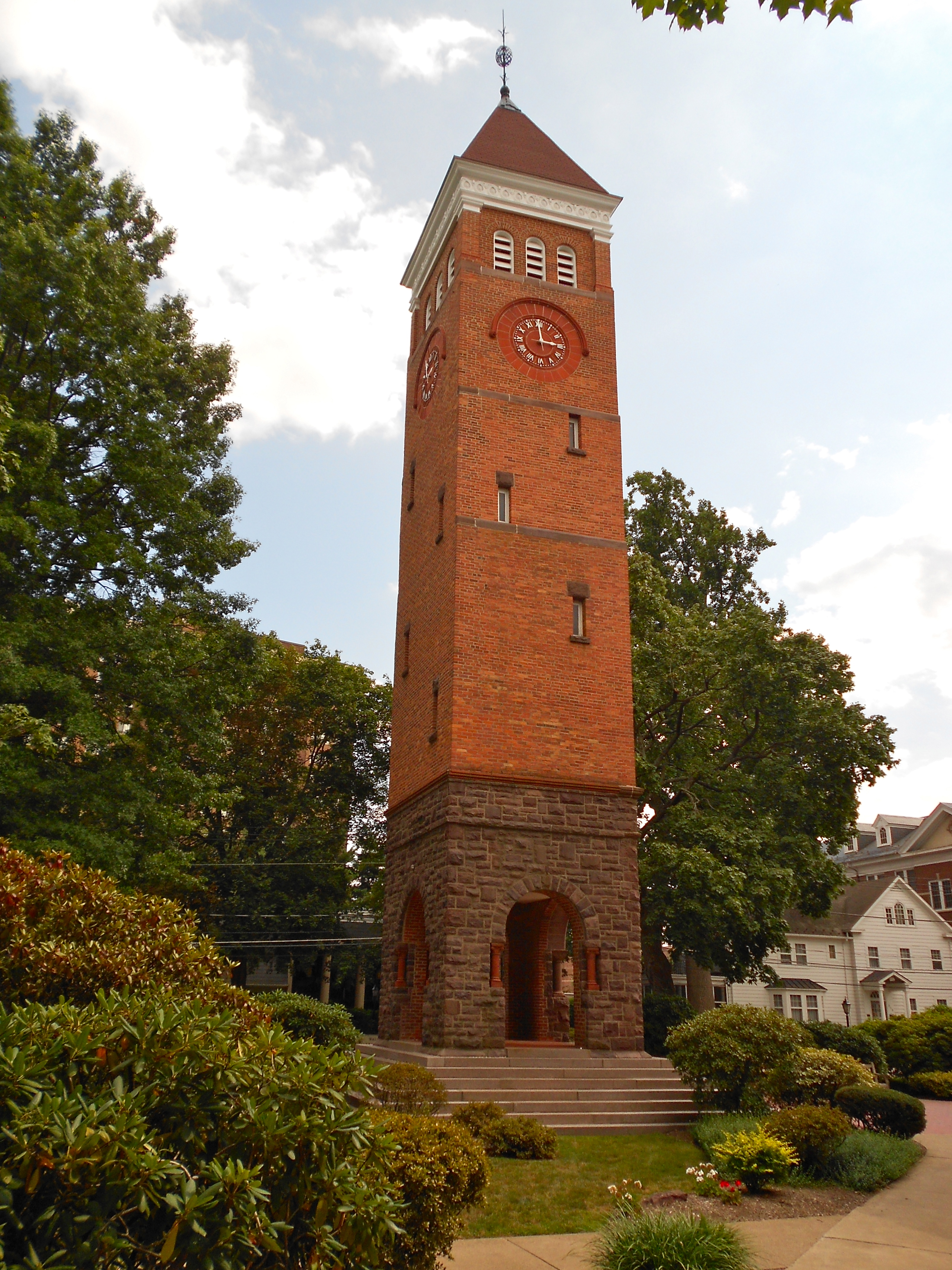
Nelson Memorial, Wyoming Seminary, Kingston, Pennsylvania, photographed in 2013.

Methodist Episcopal Church, Dallas, Pennsylvania, completed 1889.

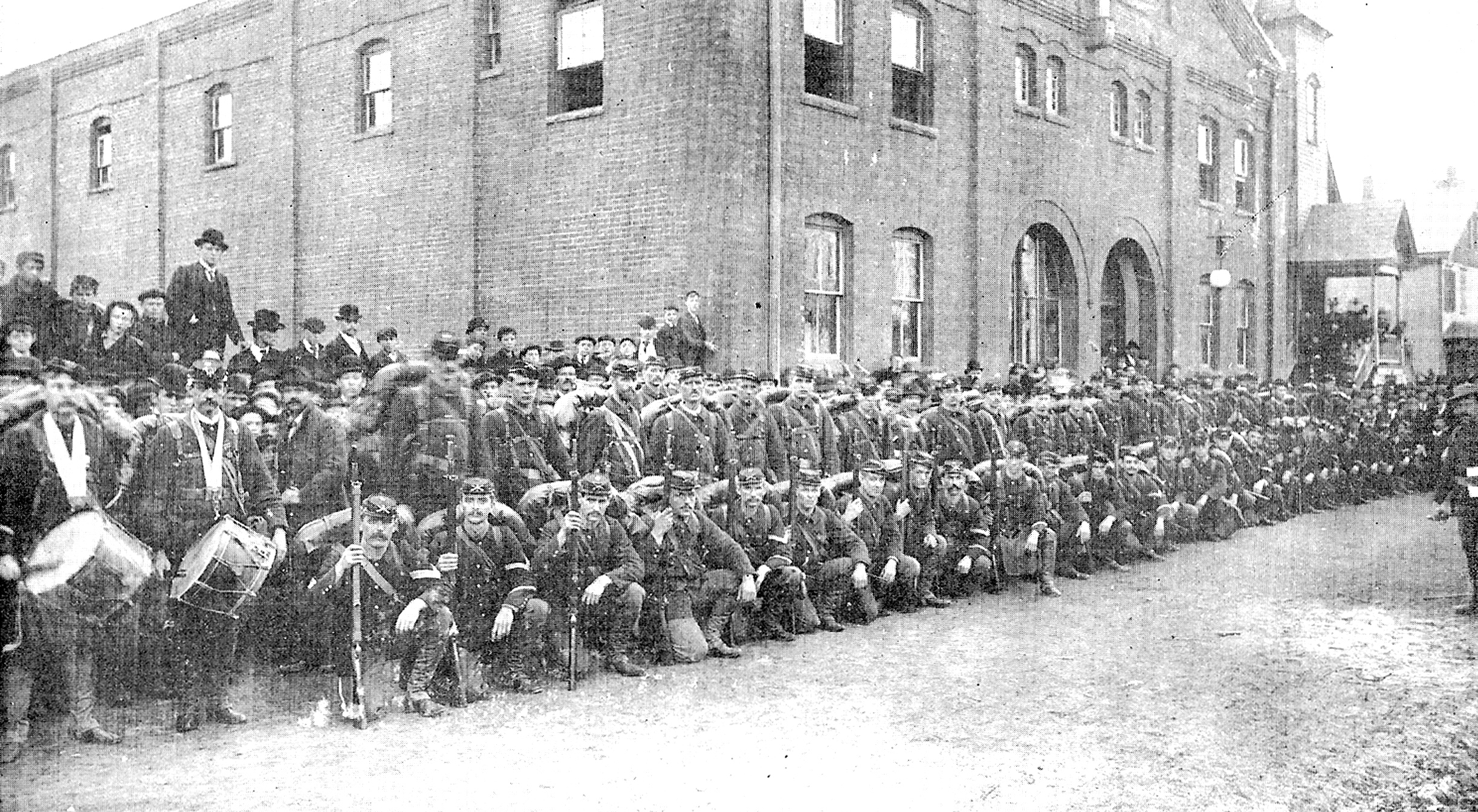
Armory, Gaylord Avenue, Plymouth, Pennsylvania, completed 1891.

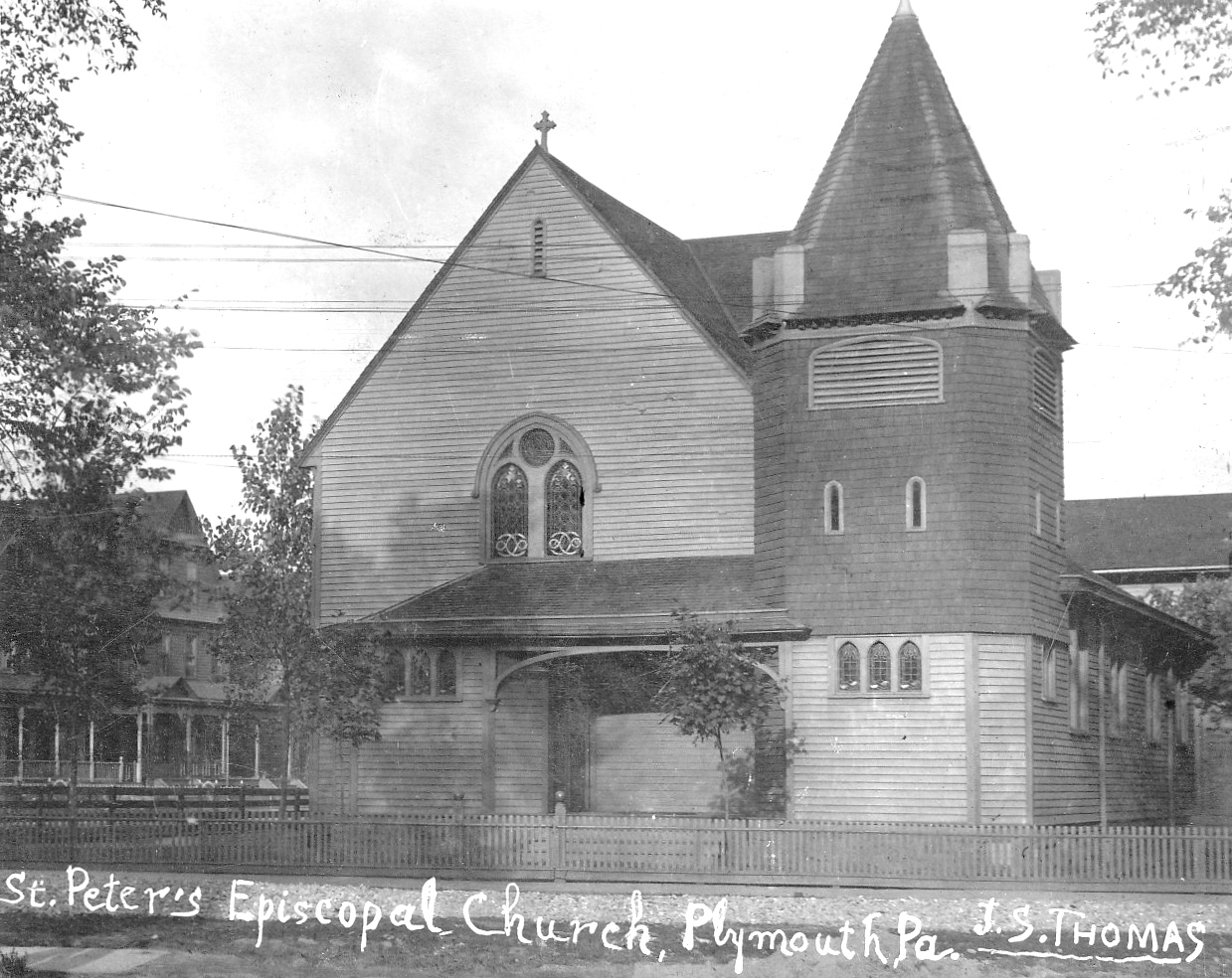
St. Peter's Episcopal Church, Plymouth, Pennsylvania, completed 1893.

Wyoming Valley Country Club, Wilkes-Barre, Pennsylvania, built 1896.

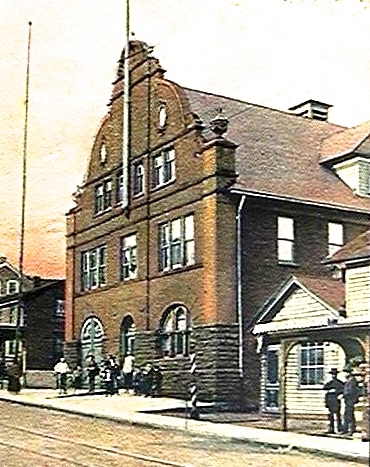
Town Hall, Edwardsville, Pennsylvania, completed 1899.

Wyoming Valley Country Club Enlargement, Wilkes-Barre, Pennsylvania, completed 1903.

Sprague Memorial, Wyoming Seminary, Kingston, Pennsylvania, completed 1928.

== See also ==
- Architecture of Plymouth, Pennsylvania
- List of British architects
- List of American architects
