= Architecture of Plymouth, Pennsylvania =

== Introduction ==
Plymouth, Pennsylvania sits on the west side of Pennsylvania's Wyoming Valley, wedged between the Susquehanna River and the Shawnee Mountain range. Just below the mountain are hills that surround the town and form a natural amphitheater that separates the town from the rest of the valley. Below the hills, the flat lands are formed in the shape of a frying pan, the pan being the Shawnee flats, once the center of the town's agricultural activities, and the handle being a spit of narrow land extending east from the flats, where the center of town is located.

At the beginning of the 19th century, Plymouth's primary industry was agriculture, and many of its residents were the descendants of the Connecticut Yankees who first settled the town. Its early architecture resembled that of a small New England village. However, vast anthracite coal beds lay below the surface at various depths, and by the 1850s, coal mining was the town's primary occupation, attracting a more diverse population. After the arrival of the railroad in 1857, the town's architecture became more typical of a growing industrial center.

== Notable buildings (1780–1860) ==
Name	Image	Image Date	Location	Year Built	Current Condition	Notes
Morse Tavern (a.k.a. Jenkins House)		1873 Photo	East Main St. across from Elm Street	Built c. 1780	Demolished	Residence/Tavern of Dr. Anna Morse Partly Demolished December 1882. 'Old Jenkins House' moved in March 1883. House Demolished 1883–1884. Elm tree cut down September 1895.
Name	Image	Image Date	Location	Year Built	Current Condition	Notes
Old Stone House		Undated Photo	West Main St. below Coal St.	Built c. 1780	Extant	Methodist congregation met there in 1792.
Name	Image	Image Date	Location	Year Built	Current Condition	Notes
Ransom House		1873 Photo	West Main St. near Coal Street	Built c. 1800	Demolished after 1873	An example of New England domestic architecture brought to Plymouth by Connecticut settlers.
Name	Image	Image Date	Location	Year Built	Current Condition	Notes
Wadhams Homestead		1864 Map 1873 Photo 2007 Photo	Academy St., near Shawnee Avenue	Built c. 1810	Extant, but much altered	1864: On Schooley Map as "Wadhams Homestead" 1873: On Beers Map as "Wadhams Homestead" 1915: "although it has been changed in appearance and altered to suit the requirements of tenants, [it] is apparently in as good condition as ever."
Name	Image	Image Date	Location	Year Built	Current Condition	Notes
The Old Academy		1873 Photo Photo About 1875	West Main St., at Academy Street	Built 1815	Converted to Tenements by 1896. Demolished c. 1955	1815: Built with funds, and on land, provided by Calvin Wadhams. School use lower floor & Church use upper floor 1873: Both upper & lower floors assigned for School use 1884: Plymouth Borough gave the Old Academy to the Lehigh & Wilkes-Barre Coal Co., in trade for the land at Shawnee Avenue on which the First High School (Central School) was built in 1884.
Name	Image	Image Date	Location	Year Built	Current Condition	Notes
Joseph Wright House		1873 Photo 1937 Photo	West Main St., below Coal Street	Built c. 1815	Demolished	Joseph Wright was the father of Hendrick Bradley Wright.
Name	Image	Image Date	Location	Year Built	Current Condition	Notes
Henderson Gaylord House		1873 Photo 1935 Photo 2007 Photo	135 West Main Street near Wadhams Street	Built c. 1830	Extant but altered	
Name	Image	Image Date	Location	Year Built	Current Condition	Notes
Jameson Harvey House		1864 Painting 1938 Photo	McDonald St. near West Nanticoke, PA	Built 1832	Extant but altered	Barn (now a residence) sits across the street
Name	Image	Image Date	Location	Year Built	Current Condition	Notes
Elijah C. Wadhams House (a.k.a. Parrish House Hotel)		1864 Map 1884 Aerial Map 1873 Photo	Main Street east of Academy Street	Built c. 1852.	Demolished	1852: Built by _____ Bennett 1873: Sold by E.C. Wadhams 1875: Converted to a hotel by A.M. Jeffords.
Name	Image	Image Date	Location	Year Built	Current Condition	Notes
Methodist Church (First Church Building)		Photo 1856—1876	Main Street across from Academy Street	Dedicated October 8, 1856.	Dismantled and relocated in 1876–1877	Dismantled and rebuilt at Forty Fort, PA, and rededicated 1877, but destroyed by fire June 2, 1900.
Name	Image	Image Date	Location	Year Built	Current Condition	Notes
Christian Church		Photo about 1904 Photo 2009	Main Street near Center Avenue	Dedicated August 1857.	Extant (as of 2022)	1857: building attributed to Thomas U. Walter, Architect 1888: alterations to entrance portico 1905: rededicated with new facade and added steeple
Name	Image	Image Date	Location	Year Built	Current Condition	Notes
Derby's Foundry		Photo 1920	West Railroad St., near Hanover St.	Built 1860	Demolished	1860: Built by John F. Derby as a foundry 1870: Converted to a planing mill and lumber yard 1873: On Beers Map as "Harvey Bros. & Kern" 1912: On Sanborn Map as "West Lumber & Mfgr" 1925: On Sanborn Map as "Plymouth Lumber Co"
Name	Image	Image Date	Location	Year Built	Current Condition	Notes

== Notable buildings (1861–1880) ==
Name	Image	Image Date	Location	Year Built	Current Condition	Notes
First National Bank (First Building)		Photo c. 1875 Photo About 1904	Main Street below Gaylord Avenue	Built c. 1865	Replaced by New Building in 1915	
Name	Image	Image Date	Location	Year Built	Current Condition	Notes
First Presbyterian Church		1910 Postcard 1910 Postcard	Church Street	Foundation 1866 Dedicated June 13, 1868	Demolished	Masonry Entrance and Steeple added between 1884–1891 Architect of Sunday School Annex (Built 1896): Harry Livingston French.
Name	Image	Image Date	Location	Year Built	Current Condition	Notes
First Welsh Baptist Church (First Church Building)		1873 Map	Girard Avenue at Ashley Street	Built 1870	Destroyed by fire in 1875.	Brick structure designed by Welsh-born, Wilkes-Barre architect Aneurin Jones (1822–1904). The Congregation relocated to Shawnee Avenue after 1875 fire
Name	Image	Image Date	Location	Year Built	Current Condition	Notes
Smith Opera House		1873 Photo 1884 Sketch 1918 Photo	West Main Street	Built 1871	Collapsed During Renovation in 1918	Replaced by Polish Alliance Hall in 1928
Name	Image	Image Date	Location	Year Built	Current Condition	Notes
Willow St School (First School Building)		1873 Map 1884 Aerial Map	Willow Street	Land purchased 1870. Built 1872.	Demolished April 1892 after mine subsidence.	Replaced by new school building in 1892
Name	Image	Image Date	Location	Year Built	Current Condition	Notes
Franklin Street School		1884 Aerial Map 1920 Photo	Franklin Street	Built 1872.	Extant	Enlarged in 1900 by architect Harry Livingston French. Sold by School Board 1978.
Name	Image	Image Date	Location	Year Built	Current Condition	Notes
St. Vincent's R.C. Church (First Church Building)		Photo c. 1883 1884 Aerial Map	Church Street	Dedicated October 1872.	Demolished March 1922.	Became a school building about 1883
Name	Image	Image Date	Location	Year Built	Current Condition	Notes
First Primitive Methodist Church		1909 Photo	Church Street at Cherry Street	Dedicated May 11, 1873.	Extant (2021)	Altered and elevated June 1887.
Name	Image	Image Date	Location	Year Built	Current Condition	Notes
Shawnee Cemetery		1908 Photo	Mountain Road	Established September 5, 1873.	Extant	An example of landscape design.
Name	Image	Image Date	Location	Year Built	Current Condition	Notes
Welsh Presbyterian Church (aka Gaylord Ave Presbyterian Church)		1873 Photo 1884 Aerial Map	115 Gaylord Avenue	Dedicated December 1873.	Since 1994 Home of Plymouth Historical Society	Congregation was chartered June 1868
Name	Image	Image Date	Location	Year Built	Current Condition	Notes
Welsh Hill Cemetery (St. Vincent's Cemetery)			Cemetery Street at Barney Street	Dedicated 1874.	Abandoned.	Graves relocated to new cemetery in 1911.
Name	Image	Image Date	Location	Year Built	Current Condition	Notes
First Water Dam (Coal Creek No. 1 Reservoir)			Coal Creek	Built 1876.	Demolished	James H. Brown, engineer; Coon Brothers, builder. The dam was 80 feet long and 15 feet deep
Name	Image	Image Date	Location	Year Built	Current Condition	Notes
Second Water Dam (Coal Creek No. 2 Reservoir)			Coal Creek	Built 1876.	Demolished	James H. Brown, engineer; Coon Brothers, builder. The dam was 110 feet long and 20 feet deep
Name	Image	Image Date	Location	Year Built	Current Condition	Notes
First Welsh Baptist Church (Second Church Building)		1884 Aerial Map	West Shawnee Avenue at Girard Avenue	Built 1876.	Extant	Sunday School Annex Added in 1916.
Name	Image	Image Date	Location	Year Built	Current Condition	Notes
Methodist Church (Second Church Building)		Photo August 1877 Photo c. 1890 1902 Map	West Main Street across from Academy Street	Built 1876–1877; dedicated January 9, 1878.	Extant	Architect: Charles Vandergrift. Photo by E.W. Beckwith illustrates the church nearing completion during labor strife of 1877 when troops were stationed in Plymouth.
Name	Image	Image Date	Location	Year Built	Current Condition	Notes
Third Water Dam (Coal Creek No. 3 Reservoir)			Coal Creek	Built 1878.	Demolished	James H. Brown, engineer; Coon Brothers, builder: Coon Brothers. The dam was 130 feet long and 25 feet deep.
Name	Image	Image Date	Location	Year Built	Current Condition	Notes
Fourth Water Dam (Coal Creek No. 4 Reservoir)			Coal Creek	Built About 1879.	Demolished	James H. Brown, engineer; Coon Brothers, builder. The dam was 330 feet long and 12 feet deep.
Name	Image	Image Date	Location	Year Built	Current Condition	Notes
Vine Street School (First School Building)		1884 Aerial Map 1896 photo	Vine Street	Built 1880	Demolished 1927	Builder: Plymouth Planing Mill.
Name	Image	Image Date	Location	Year Built	Current Condition	Notes

== Notable buildings (1881–1900) ==
Name	Image	Image Date	Location	Year Built	Current Condition	Notes
St. Stephen's Convent		1904 Photo	West Main Street at Wadhams Street	Built c. 1881 (between 1879–1884)	Extant (2021)	
Name	Image	Image Date	Location	Year Built	Current Condition	Notes
German Reformed Church		1884 Aerial Map	Willow Street	Dedicated November 5, 1882.	Extant (2022)	
Name	Image	Image Date	Location	Year Built	Current Condition	Notes
Franklin Street Primitive Methodist Church (First Church Building)		1884 Aerial Map 1884 Aerial Map	Franklin Street at Mill Street	Dedicated January 28, 1883.	Destroyed by fire on March 2, 1913.	Formerly the Presbyterian Church of Kingston, built in 1842 and moved to Plymouth in 1882.
Name	Image	Image Date	Location	Year Built	Current Condition	Notes
John J. Shonk House		2017 Photo Photo about 1900	East Main Street at Vine Street	Completed December 1883.	Extant	Front porch modified between 1912 and 1925. The sprinter Ben Johnson lived in this house from 1929–1933 when it was owned by Shonk's daughter Clara McAlarney.
Name	Image	Image Date	Location	Year Built	Current Condition	Notes
St. Peter's Episcopal Church (First Church Building)		1884 Aerial Map	Academy St, between Ashley St and West Main St	1879–1884	Replaced by new church in 1893	Formerly "Old Schoolhouse" on Main St., but was relocated and enlarged (after 1879 but before 1884).
Name	Image	Image Date	Location	Year Built	Current Condition	Notes
First High School		1904 Postcard 1904 Photo	Shawnee Avenue	Built 1884	Destroyed by fire in 1905	Architect: Frederick J. Amsden. Builder: Samuel Livingston French, Plymouth Planing Mill
Name	Image	Image Date	Location	Year Built	Current Condition	Notes
St. Mary's R.C. Church (First Church Building and Second School Building)		1891 Map	Willow Street.	Completed c. 1885	Demolished c. 1950 and replaced with new school building in 1951.	Wood frame building. After the dedication of The second church building in 1905, the first church building was converted to a schoolhouse.
Name	Image	Image Date	Location	Year Built	Current Condition	Notes
St. Mary's R.C. School (First School Building)		1891 Map	Willow Street	Completed c. 1885	Demolished	Wood frame building. Converted to a dwelling c. 1907.
Name	Image	Image Date	Location	Year Built	Current Condition	Notes
Hose Co. No. 2 (First Firehouse)			Davenport Street at Shawnee Avenue	Built c. 1886		Replaced in 1898 by Second Firehouse on West Main Street.
Name	Image	Image Date	Location	Year Built	Current Condition	Notes
St. Vincent's R.C. Church (Second Church Building)		Postcard c. 1910 Photo 2017	Church St.	Cornerstone laid September 1882. Dedicated September 1887.	Extant but unused since 2006.	Architect: Frederick J. Amsden, Scranton, PA. Builder: J. Nelson, Scranton, PA. Murals: Ferdinand Baraldi, Philadelphia, Pennsylvania.
Name	Image	Image Date	Location	Year Built	Current Condition	Notes
Pioneer Knitting Mills		1896 Map Lithograph c. 1898 Postcard c. 1910	Shawnee Avenue East of Downing Street	Established 1890. East Wing added 1897	Demolished after 1940 Basement level remains in use	Proprietor: Ambrose West
Name	Image	Image Date	Location	Year Built	Current Condition	Notes
Pilgrim Congregational Church			Center Avenue at Shawnee Avenue	Built after 1873 and by 1891.	Extant (2022)	
Name	Image	Image Date	Location	Year Built	Current Condition	Notes
No. 3 Fire Company (First Fire House)		Photo c. 1890	Vine Street	Built by 1891.		Converted to a residence after 1907.
Name	Image	Image Date	Location	Year Built	Current Condition	Notes
Wyoming Valley Knitting Mills		1896 Map 1897 Portrait	Shawnee Avenue Between Downing and Academy Streets	Established 1891	Demolished after 1925	Proprietor: Thomas West
Name	Image	Image Date	Location	Year Built	Current Condition	Notes
St. Casimir's (Lithuanian) R.C. Church (First Church Building)		Photo c. 1899	Chestnut Street	Dedicated January 1891.	Destroyed by fire January 1902	Builder: Grant White.
Name	Image	Image Date	Location	Year Built	Current Condition	Notes
Ebenezer English Baptist Church			Gaylord Avenue at Ashley Street	Dedicated October 18, 1891.	Extant	Congregation was chartered on June 11, 1888.
Name	Image	Image Date	Location	Year Built	Current Condition	Notes
Town Hall (Gaylord Avenue)		Photo c. 1900 1918 Photo	Gaylord Avenue	Built 1891.	Sold for $2,500 in 1943 then demolished in 1944.	Architect: Frederick J. Amsden, Scranton, PA. Builder: Joseph W. Campbell, and/or Charles C. Ransom.
Name	Image	Image Date	Location	Year Built	Current Condition	Notes
Plymouth Armory (PA National Guard)		1898 Photo (During Spanish–American War)	Gaylord Avenue	Built 1891	Demolished	Architect: Kipp & Podmore, Wilkes-Barre, PA. Builder: Charles C. Ransom.
Name	Image	Image Date	Location	Year Built	Current Condition	Notes
Willow Street School (Second School Building)		1896 Map 1920 photo	Willow Street	Built 1892	Demolished October 1972.	Architect: Frederick J. Amsden. Builder: J.W. Campbell, Plymouth, PA Abandoned as school in 1959. Re-opened as Youth Center in 1963.
Name	Image	Image Date	Location	Year Built	Current Condition	Notes
DL&W RR Passenger Depot		1896 Map Postcard c. 1910	West Main Street	Completed August 1893.	Demolished after 1949	Note: Passenger service ended November 15, 1949.
Name	Image	Image Date	Location	Year Built	Current Condition	Notes
St. Peter's Episcopal Church (Second Church Building)		Postcard c. 1910	Academy Street at Ashley Street	Dedicated October 1893	Demolished	Architect: Thomas Podmore.
Name	Image	Image Date	Location	Year Built	Current Condition	Notes
St. Vincent's Rectory		August 2017 Photo	Church Street at Eno Street	Completed December 1893	Extant	Architect: Frederick J. Amsden. Builder: William O'Malley, Wilkes-Barre, PA.
Name	Image	Image Date	Location	Year Built	Current Condition	Notes
St. Stephen's R.C. Church (First Church Building)		1894 Photo 1904 Photo	Girard Avenue	Cornerstone laid October 23, 1887. Dedicated November 29, 1894.	Demolished 1953	Architect: Frederick J. Amsden.
Name	Image	Image Date	Location	Year Built	Current Condition	Notes
Carey Avenue Bridge (First Bridge)		1904 Photo 1904 Photo		Built 1895.	Demolished in 1948 and Reused at Retreat Hospital, Newport Twp., PA in 1951.	Builder: Penn Bridge Co.
Name	Image	Image Date	Location	Year Built	Current Condition	Notes
Stegmaier's Beer Depot			Rear of 130 West Main Street	After 1891 but before 1896	Abandoned or demolished (2022)	Later became the Golden Quality Ice Cream factory
Name	Image	Image Date	Location	Year Built	Current Condition	Notes
Elm Congregational Church (First Church Building)		Photo c. 1900	East Main, opposite Elm Street	Cornerstone May 24, 1896. Dedicated September 27, 1896.	Destroyed by fire on January 15, 1916.	Built on site of old Morse Tavern.
Name	Image	Image Date	Location	Year Built	Current Condition	Notes
Barn Hill School (aka Temperance Hill School)		Photo c. 1930		Built 1898.		Replaced 'Little Red Schoolhouse' on Temperance Hill Three-room schoolhouse; abandoned as school in 1936
Name	Image	Image Date	Location	Year Built	Current Condition	Notes
Hose Company No. 2 (Second Firehouse)				Completed October 1898.	Extant with Added Wing	
Name	Image	Image Date	Location	Year Built	Current Condition	Notes
Nottingham Street School			Nottingham Street, between 2nd and 3rd Streets	Built 1898.	Extant (2022) but no longer a schoolhouse	Enlarged in 1910 Abandoned as school in 1957.
Name	Image	Image Date	Location	Year Built	Current Condition	Notes
SS Peter & Paul Greek Catholic Church (First Church Building)		1925 Photo	20 Turner Street	Dedicated May 30, 1899.	Demolished	
Name	Image	Image Date	Location	Year Built	Current Condition	Notes
St. John the Baptist R.C. Church		Photo c. 1910	Nesbitt Street at 3rd Street (Larksville)	Dedicated May 31, 1899.	Extant	
Name	Image	Image Date	Location	Year Built	Current Condition	Notes
Ambrose West House		Postcard c. 1910 1906 Photo	Shawnee Avenue	Built 1899.	Town Hall from 1943–1974 Demolished May 1974.	Builder: Charles C. Ransom. Became Plymouth Town Hall in 1943
Name	Image	Image Date	Location	Year Built	Current Condition	Notes
Polish National Catholic Church (First Church Building)		Postcard c. 1950	Main Street near Vine Street	Under construction by November 1898; cornerstone dedicated on December 26, 1898.	Demolished 1990	Clad in aluminum siding in 1956.
Name	Image	Image Date	Location	Year Built	Current Condition	Notes

== Notable buildings (1901–1930) ==
Name	Image	Image Date	Location	Year Built	Current Condition	Notes
St. Casimir's (Lithuanian) R.C. Church (Second Church Building)		About 1910	Chestnut Street	Dedicated April 1903.	Demolished in 1955 following mine subsidence.	Replaced by new church in Hanover Twp., PA, dedicated April 1957.
Name	Image	Image Date	Location	Year Built	Current Condition	Notes
St. Mary's (Polish) R.C. Church (Second Church Building)		Postcard about 1915 Postcard about 1940	Willow St	Foundation built 1902; Dedicated May 30, 1905	Extant but altered.	Damaged by fire February 1919. Re-opened September 1921. Architect: Harry A. Weise Brick bell tower added in 1984
Name	Image	Image Date	Location	Year Built	Current Condition	Notes
St. Vincent's Convent		Postcard About 1915	Church Street	Dedicated 1905	Extant	Architect: Owen McGlynn Builder: Charles C. Ransom.
Name	Image	Image Date	Location	Year Built	Current Condition	Notes
Second High School (aka Central High School)		Postcard About 1910	Shawnee Avenue	Built 1906	Demolished About 1980	Architect: Harry Livingston French Builder: Charles C. Ransom
Name	Image	Image Date	Location	Year Built	Current Condition	Notes
Plymouth National Bank		Postcard About 1910	East Main Street Between Eno St and Center Ave	Built 1907	Facade destroyed in 1966 alteration	Architect: Harry Livingston French
Name	Image	Image Date	Location	Year Built	Current Condition	Notes
No. 3 Fire Company			Vine Street	Dedicated May 26, 1908.	Extant	Builder: Charles C. Ransom
Name	Image	Image Date	Location	Year Built	Current Condition	Notes
No. 1 Fire Company		Postcard about 1910	Gaylord Avenue	Dedicated December 1908.	Extant	Architect: Charles Wilson. Builder: J.D. Cooper
Name	Image	Image Date	Location	Year Built	Current Condition	Notes
Third High School		Postcard About 1920. 2007 Photo	Main St. at Wadhams St.	Built 1913 Became the Junior High School after 1925 Became an elementary school after 1979	Demolished 2014	Architect: Alfred Freeman, New York, NY Addition built 1928, Ralph M. Herr, Architect. 13 Room Addition built 1937, Ralph M. Herr, Architect.
Name	Image	Image Date	Location	Year Built	Current Condition	Notes
Harveys Creek Aqueduct			Components: 1) a 1-1/2 mile open channel leading from Pikes Creek Reservoir runs along the west side of Harveys Creek to 2) a 26" diameter pipeline, running down the hill to Harveys Creek and up the hill on the east side, feeding 3) a 2,700 foot-long reinforced concrete aqueduct on the hillside above Harveys Creek, terminating at 4) a short connecting pipeline, running into 5) a 3,400 foot-long, 9' x 7' tunnel, running beneath Shawnee Mountain, emptying into 6) a small collecting reservoir (known as the Jersey Reservoir), drained by 7) a 48" diameter pipeline, 1,300 feet-long, connecting to the distribution point at Coal Creek.	Built 1912–1913	Partially Extant; Abandoned 2011 or earlier.	Engineer: J.H. Lance, Spring Brook Water Co. Builder: Frank Melvin Capacity: 50 million gallons per day
Name	Image	Date of Image	Location	Year Built	Current Condition	Notes
Franklin Street Primitive Methodist Church (Second Church Building)		1971 Postcard	Franklin Street at Mill Street	Dedicated November 2, 1913	Extant (2018)	Replaced First Church Building destroyed by fire in 1913.
Name	Image	Date of Image	Location	Year Built	Current Condition	Notes
Plymouth–Breslau Bridge		1914 Photo 1915 Photo 1989 Photo	Opposite Gaylord Avenue	Completed 1914.	Demolished	Builder: Penn Bridge Co., Beaver Falls, PA, H.S. Battie, Engineer Bridge widened in 1945–1946
Name	Image	Image Date	Location	Year Built	Current Condition	Notes
First National Bank (Second Building)		Postcard 1915 2009 Photo	West Main St.	Built 1915	Extant	Architect: Harry Livingston French
Name	Image	Image Date	Location	Year Built	Current Condition	Notes
Elm Congregational Church (Second Church Building)		2009 Photo	East Main opposite Elm Street	Cornerstone May 12, 1917.	Extant	Builder: Samuel Reynolds.
Name	Image	Image Date	Location	Year Built	Current Condition	Notes
Soldiers & Sailors Monument		1932 Photo 2007 Photo	West Main Street	Dedicated in 1920	Extant but needing restoration	Sculptor: George Brewster
Name	Image	Image Date	Location	Year Built	Current Condition	Notes
Huber Stadium, Plymouth High School		Postcard About 1940	West Main Street	Dedicated May 15, 1920.	Replaced with new athletic fields about 2014	Stadium walls were built around existing athletic fields from Sept 1935 to July 1936 with WPA labor. Architect: Ralph M. Herr.
Name	Image	Image Date	Location	Year Built	Current Condition	Notes
St. Vincent's School (Second School Building)		August 2017 Photo	Church St.	Built 1922	Extant but converted to residential use	Architect: Emile G. Perrot, Philadelphia, PA.
Name	Image	Image Date	Location	Year Built	Current Condition	Notes
St. Stephen's Parochial School			Wadhams Street	Begun June 1922 Dedicated September 3, 1923.	Demolished	Architect: Henry A. Weise Builder: Alaimo Brothers, Pittston, PA
Name	Image	Image Date	Location	Year Built	Current Condition	Notes
B'nai Israel Synagogue		1924 Photo	Center Avenue near Church Street	Cornerstone October 5, 1924.	Extant	Architect: Henry A. Weise. Builder: Harry T. Perkins.
Name	Image	Image Date	Location	Year Built	Current Condition	Notes
Fourth High School (aka Ward P. Davenport High School)		1932 Photo	West Main Street	Dedicated February 1925	Demolished 1979.	Architect: Lewis Hancock Jr., Scranton, PA Builder: Herman Mailander
Name	Image	Image Date	Location	Year Built	Current Condition	Notes
Shawnee Movie Theater		1925 Photo	West Main Street	Grand Opening May 25, 1925	Demolished	
Name	Image	Image Date	Location	Year Built	Current Condition	Notes
Polish Alliance Hall		August 2017 Photo	404 West Main Street	Dedicated 1928	Extant	Architect: Thomas A. Foster Contractor: M.L. Roth.
Name	Image	Image Date	Location	Year Built	Current Condition	Notes
Vine Street School (Second School Building)		1928 Photo	Vine Street	Dedicated September 1928.	Extant (2021) but no longer a school.	Architect: Ralph M. Herr
Name	Image	Image Date	Location	Year Built	Current Condition	Notes
Comerford Mausoleum			St Vincent's Cemetery	Dedicated May 30, 1928.	Extant (2023).	
Name	Image	Image Date	Location	Year Built	Current Condition	Notes
Bell Telephone Building		1930 Photo	37-39 Willow Street	Built 1930.		Mechanized telephone switching station, which replaced human telephone operators based in Center Avenue office.
Name	Image	Image Date	Location	Year Built	Current Condition	Notes

== Notable buildings (1931–1972) ==
Name	Image	Image Date	Location	Year Built	Current Condition	Notes
Plymouth Post Office		Postcard c. 1940 2017 Photo	West Main Street	Dedicated November 1935	Extant. Addition completed February 1966.	Replaced post office at 127 West Main Street. Murals by Jared French
Name	Image	Image Date	Location	Year Built	Current Condition	Notes
Huber Stadium Walls, Plymouth High School		Postcard c. 1940	West Main Street	Walls completed 1936	Demolished and replaced with new athletic fields about 2014	Stadium walls were built around existing athletic fields from Sept 1935 to July 1936 with WPA labor. Architect: Ralph M. Herr.
Name	Image	Image Date	Location	Year Built	Current Condition	Notes
Dr. George R. Drake Memorial Electric Scoreboard			In Huber Stadium	Dedicated September 1948.	Demolished	Paid for by the Plymouth Lettermen's Club
Name	Image	Image Date	Location	Year Built	Current Condition	Notes
Carey Avenue Bridge (Second Bridge)				Dedicated September 20, 1948.	Demolished in 2002 and replaced by third bridge.	Builder: C. F. Goeringer
Name	Image	Image Date	Location	Year Built	Current Condition	Notes
St. Mary's Parochial School (Third School Building)			Willow Street	Dedicated September 9, 1951	Extant	Architect: Michael J. Bochnik
Name	Image	Image Date	Location	Year Built	Current Condition	Notes
Ebenezer Baptist Church Educational Building			Girard Avenue	Dedicated June 8, 1952.	Extant	Architect: Michael J. Bochnik Builder: William Jenkins, Plymouth, PA
Name	Image	Image Date	Location	Year Built	Current Condition	Notes
St. Stephen's Church (Second Church Building)			Wadhams Street	Dedicated July 3, 1955	Extant	Architect: George Yundt, Allentown, PA. Builder: Anthony Grosek, Plains, PA.
Name	Image	Image Date	Location	Year Built	Current Condition	Notes
Plymouth National Guard Armory (Second Building)			747 West Main Street	Dedicated September 22, 1962.	Extant	Architect: Price & Dickey, Architects, Media, PA Builder: Raymon R. Hedden & Co., Dallas, PA
Name	Image	Image Date	Location	Year Built	Current Condition	Notes
Plymouth Public Library			West Main Street	Completed February 1969 Dedicated May 17, 1970.	Extant	Architect: Michael J. Bochnik
Name	Image	Image Date	Location	Year Built	Current Condition	Notes

== Coal breakers below Academy Street ==
Name	Image	Date of Image	Map	Location	Year Built	Current Condition	Notes
Jameson Harvey Breaker		1864 Painting		West Main Street near West Nanticoke		Demolished in 1871 after a boiler explosion.	
Grand Tunnel - Freeman Thomas's Coal Chute				West Main Street near West Nanticoke	Built c. 1832 by Freeman Thomas.	Destroyed by fire January 1860.	
Grand Tunnel - Mammouth Co.'s Coal Chute				West Main Street near West Nanticoke	Built in 1860 to replace Freeman Thomas' Grand Tunnel Coal Chute.		
MacFarlane Breaker				West Main Street near West Nanticoke	Built 1857.	Destroyed by fire in 1865.	
Susquehanna Coal Co. No. 3 Breaker		Photo by E.W. Beckwith c. 1875	1884 Map	West Main Street near West Nanticoke	Built 1872 to replace Jameson Harvey Breaker	Demolished 1932	Designer: Charles F. Ingram, Engineer, Wilkes-Barre, Pennsylvania Builder: James Linskill. Purchased in 1922 by the Grand Tunnel Coal Co.
Name	Image	Date of Image	Map	Location	Year Built	Current Condition	Notes
Chauncey Colliery Breaker (First Building)		1911	1884 Map	West Main Street	Built Before 1873	Demolished 1919	
Chauncey Colliery Breaker (Second Building)				West Main Street	Built 1919.	Destroyed by Fire January 1923	Designer: Frank B. Davenport, Engineer.
Chauncey Colliery Breaker (Third Building)		1926		West Main Street	Completed April 1923.	Demolished 1941	Designer: Paul Sterling, Engineer, Wilkes-Barre, PA Builder: E.E. Reilly, Kingston, PA
Name	Image	Date of Image	Map	Location	Year Built	Current Condition	Notes
Avondale Colliery Breaker (First Building)		September 1869		West Main Street		Destroyed by fire September 1869	
Avondale Colliery Breaker (Second Building)			1884 Map	West Main Street	Built 1870		Designer: Henry J. Phillips, Engineer.
Avondale Colliery Breaker (Third Building)				West Main Street	Completed November 1905.	Demolished 1935	
Name	Image	Date of Image	Map	Location	Year Built	Current Condition	Notes
Jersey Colliery Breaker			1884 Map	West Main Street	Built before 1873.	Demolished after 1884	
Name	Image	Date of Image	Map	Location	Year Built	Current Condition	Notes
Plymouth Red Ash Coal Co. Breaker				West Main Street East of DeHaven Street	Completed December 1914.	Demolished June 1942.	Leased from John Turner Estate
Name	Image	Date of Image	Map	Location	Year Built	Current Condition	Notes
Washington Colliery Breaker (First Building)		1884	1884 Map	Flat Road below West Main Street	Built c. 1854	Demolished 1890	Known (by 1873) as J. R. Reynolds Breaker Known (by 1884) as Lehigh & Wilkes-Barre Coal Co. "Reynolds No. 16"
Washington Colliery Breaker (Second Building)		Postcard c. 1906		Flat Road below West Main Street	Built 1890	Demolished 1912	Known as Lehigh & Wilkes-Barre Coal Co. "Reynolds No. 16"
Name	Image	Date of Image	Map	Location	Year Built	Current Condition	Notes
Nottingham Colliery Breaker (First Building)		Postcard 1905 Old Breaker (left) New Breaker (right)	1884 Map	West Main Street	Built 1868. Enlarged 1875.	Demolished 1905	
Nottingham Colliery Breaker (Second Building)		Postcard c. 1910	NA	West Main Street	Built 1903–1905	Demolished August 1936	
Name	Image	Date of Image	Map	Location	Year Built	Current Condition	Notes

== Coal breakers above Academy Street ==
Name	Image	Date of Image	Map	Location	Year Built	Current Condition	Notes
Parrish Colliery Breaker (First Building)		1884 (see item 28 on aerial map)		West Main Street near Downing Street	Built 1884	Destroyed by fire 1887	Builder: Joseph C. Tyrrell.
Parrish Colliery Breaker (Second Building)		1901	1896 map 1902 Map	West Main Street near Downing Street	Completed 1887.	Collapsed in Storm 1920	Builder: J.C. Tyrrell. Foreman: Alexander Scott.
Name	Image	Date of Image	Map	Location	Year Built	Current Condition	Notes
Dodson Colliery Breaker (First Building)		Photo c. 1875 Photo August 1877	1884 Map	East Main Street opposite Cherry Street	Built 1870	Destroyed by fire July 1899	
Dodson Colliery Breaker (Second Building)		Postcard c. 1912	1902 Map	East Main Street opposite Cherry Street	Built 1900	Demolished	
Name	Image	Date of Image	Map	Location	Year Built	Current Condition	Notes
Lance Colliery Breaker (First Building)		Photo c. 1867 1877 Photo		East Main Street near Chestnut Street	Built c. 1865; Remodeled in 1873.	Demolition begun October 1882.	1877 Photo shows Lance Breaker in Distance.
Lance Colliery Breaker (Second Building)		1884 Aerial Map 1899 Photo	1884 Map	East Main Street near Chestnut Street	Built 1882-1883.	Demolished July 1931.	
Lance Colliery Breaker (Third Building)		Postcard c. 1940		East Main Street near Chestnut Street	Built 1931	Demolished (some ancillary buildings remain)	
Name	Image	Date of Image	Map	Location	Year Built	Current Condition	Notes
Gaylord Colliery Breaker (First Building)			1873 Map	Washington Avenue (aka Prospect Avenue) above Cherry Street	Built c. 1872.	Destroyed by fire 1879	
Gaylord Colliery Breaker (Second Building)		1884 Aerial Map Postcard c. 1906	1884 Map	Washington Avenue (aka Prospect Avenue) above Cherry Street	Built 1879	Demolished 1935	Builder: A.B. Tyrell.
Name	Image	Date of Image	Map	Location	Year Built	Current Condition	Notes
Hillside Colliery Breaker				Plymouth "above Welsh Hill."	Completed May 1906	Demolished after 1917	Builder: Coats & Haywood.
Name	Image	Date of Image	Map	Location	Year Built	Current Condition	Notes
D&H Breaker No. 5 (aka Fuller's Shaft) (First Building)		1884 1905	1884 Map	Washington Avenue above Carver Street	Built before 1873	Became a Washery 1899; Destroyed by fire April 1907.	
D&H Breaker No. 5 (Loree) (Second Building)		Postcard c. 1910		Shupp's Creek	Built about 1898.	Destroyed by Fire 1919.	
D&H Breaker No. 5 (Loree) (Third Building)		1919 Photos		Shupp's Creek	Completed April 1919.	Demolished in 1993.	
Name	Image	Date of Image	Map	Location	Year Built	Current Condition	Notes
D&H Breaker No. 4 (Swetland Shaft)		1884 Aerial Map	1884 Map	Intersection of Vine Street and State Street	Built 1857.	Abandoned January 1899. Demolished 1901	
Name	Image	Date of Image	Map	Location	Year Built	Current Condition	Notes
Boston Colliery Breaker (First Building)		Photo c. 1875	1884 Map	East Main Street at Shupp's Creek	Built 1874 or earlier.	Destroyed by fire in 1887	Photo by E.W. Beckwith
Boston Colliery Breaker (Second Building)		1904	NA	State Street at Shupp's Creek	Built 1887	Demolished 1909	
Name	Image	Date of Image	Map	Location	Year Built	Current Condition	Notes
D&H No.1 Colliery Breaker (First Building)				East Main Street at Shupp's Creek		Destroyed by Fire September 1, 1876.	
D&H No.1 Colliery Breaker (Second Building)			1884 Map	East Main Street at Shupp's Creek		Demolished	
Name	Image	Date of Image	Map	Location	Year Built	Current Condition	Notes
D&H No.2 Colliery Breaker			1884 Map	Shupp's Creek	Built 1864.	Demolished 1916.	
Name	Image	Date of Image	Map	Location	Year Built	Current Condition	Notes
D&H No.3 Colliery Breaker (First Building)			1884 Map	Shupp's Creek	Built before 1873. Unused as of October 1879.	Destroyed by Fire November 15, 1894.	
D&H No.3 Colliery Breaker (Second Building)				Shupp's Creek	Built 1893	Destroyed by Fire 1916.	
Name	Image	Date of Image	Map	Location	Year Built	Current Condition	Notes
Woodward Colliery (First Building)		1900 Photo		Toby's Creek (Edwardsville)	Completed July 1888.	Demolished 1917	
Woodward Colliery (Second Building)				Toby's Creek (Edwardsville)	Built 1917.	Demolished	Foundation: Curtis Construction Co. of New York.
Name	Image	Date of Image	Map	Location	Year Built	Current Condition	Notes

== See also ==
- History of Plymouth, Pennsylvania
- Coal mining in Plymouth, Pennsylvania
- Pennamite–Yankee War
- Plymouth, Pennsylvania
