= Edwards =

Edwards may refer to:

== People ==
- Edwards (surname), an English surname
- Edwards family, a prominent family from Chile
- Edwards Barham (1937–2014), American politician
- Edwards Davis (1873–1936), American actor, producer, and playwright
- Edwards Pierrepont (1817–1892), American attorney, jurist, and orator

== Places ==
=== United States ===
- Edwards, Arkansas, in Prairie County
- Edwards, California
- Edwards, Colorado
- Edwards, Illinois
- Edwards, Kentucky, in Logan County (see April 2, 2006 tornado outbreak)
- Edwards Dam, a former dam on the Kennebec River in Maine
- Edwards, Michigan
- Edwards, Mississippi
- Edwards, Missouri
- Edwards (town), New York
- Edwards (village), New York
- Edwards, Wisconsin
- Edwards Air Force Base, in California
- Edwards Plateau region of Texas
  - Edwards Aquifer, an aquifer in that region
- Edwards County, Illinois
- Edwards County, Kansas
- Edwards County, Texas
- Edwards Township, Michigan
- Edwards Township, Minnesota
- Edwards River (Illinois)

=== Elsewhere ===
- Edwards Islet (Tasmania), Australia
- Edwards Islet (Ducie Island), in the Pitcairn Islands
- Edwards, Osgoode Township, Ontario, Canada
- Edwards River (Mid Canterbury), a tributary of the Bealey River in New Zealand
- Edwards River (North Canterbury), a tributary of the (northern) Waiau River in New Zealand

== Corporations and products ==
- A. G. Edwards, a full-service US securities broker-dealer
- Edwards Lifesciences, a manufacturer of cardiovascular disease treatment equipment
- Edwards Ltd, a vacuum engineering business of Atlas Copco
- Edwards Theaters, a movie theatre chain owned by Regal Entertainment Group
- ESP Edwards Series, an electric guitar brand produced by the ESP company in Japan
- Edwards, a brand name of frozen pies owned by the Schwan Food Company
- Edwards Super Food Store, a former supermarket chain in the United States
- Edwards Personal Preference Schedule, a non-projective personality inventory
- JD Edwards, a computer software company

== Court cases ==
- Edwards v. Aguillard, a 1987 U.S. Supreme Court ruling on teaching Creationism in Louisiana
- Edwards v. Arizona, a 1981 U.S. Supreme Court ruling on police interrogation and the fifth amendment
- Edwards v. California, a 1941 U.S. Supreme Court ruling on interstate migration
- Edwards v. Habib, a 1968 D.C. Circuit (United States) decision on retaliatory eviction
- Edwards v. Habib, a 1953 U.S. Supreme Court ruling on demonstrations at a state house
- Indiana v. Edwards, a 2008 U.S. Supreme Court ruling on competency to stand trial
- Edwards v. Canada (Attorney General), also known as the Persons Case, a 1930 case in the Judicial Committee of the Imperial Privy Council on women's eligibility to be members of the Canadian federal Senate
- Edwards v National Coal Board, a 1949 English Court of Appeal ruling on the meaning of "reasonably practicable"
- Grant v Edwards, a 1986 English Court of Appeal case on common intention

== Other uses ==
- USS Edwards, various United States Navy ships
- Edwards syndrome, a genetic disorder

== See also ==
- Edward (disambiguation)
- Edwardsville (disambiguation)
