= Owen McGlynn =

American architect (1878–1918)

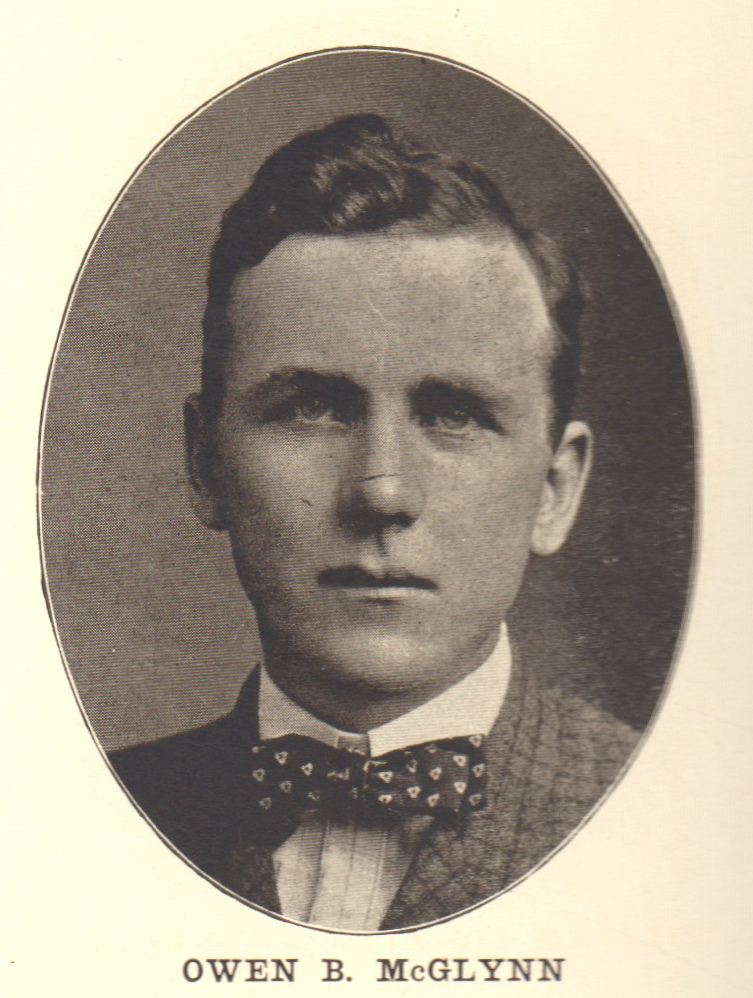

Owen McGlynn (March 28, 1878 – October 15, 1918) was an architect who practiced in Wilkes-Barre, Pennsylvania at the end of the nineteenth century and at the beginning of the twentieth. He designed in a variety of styles, including the classical and Gothic revival. His built works included numerous banks, schools and churches.

== Biography ==
McGlynn was born in Stockton, Pennsylvania, on March 28, 1878, the son of Daniel and Bridget McGlynn. The father immigrated to the United States in 1866 and worked as a coal miner. The son was educated at St. Mary's R.C. School in Wilkes-Barre, Pennsylvania. In the 1900 census of Wilkes-Barre, McGlynn gave his age as 23 and his occupation as architect.

Around 1900, McGlynn formed a partnership with an older, more established architect, Benjamin Davey, Jr. That year, they completed the new St. Aloysius R.C. Church in Lee Park, near Wilkes-Barre, to which they each donated a stained glass window. After Davey died in December 1901, McGlynn assumed full ownership of the practice.

McGlynn married Elizabeth MacDermott on October 17, 1900. He died on October 15, 1918, of pneumonia brought on as a result of the Spanish flu.

== Architectural works ==
Among the completed works of Owen McGlynn are the following:

- Rubinsky Building, Market Street Luzerne, Pennsylvania (1897, while employed by Rudrauff & Davey)
- C.M. Schwab School, Weatherly, Pennsylvania, begun September 1901 and dedicated on September 19, 1903
- St. Ann's Monastery, Scranton, Pennsylvania (dedicated in March 1904)
- 27 South Main Street Office Building, Wilkes-Barre, Pennsylvania (completed in 1904)
- Nanticoke High School, Nanticoke, Pennsylvania (completed in 1904)
- School and Convent, St. Mary's Church, Washington St., Wilkes-Barre, Pennsylvania (1905)
- Convent, St. Vincent's Church, Plymouth, Pennsylvania (completed in 1905)
- Sacred Heart of Jesus Church, Wilkes-Barre, Pennsylvania, (cornerstone laid October 14, 1906)
- St. Mary's School, conversion of church to school, Plymouth, Pennsylvania (1907)
- First National Bank, Nanticoke, Pennsylvania (1907)
- First National Bank, Lansford, Pennsylvania (1907)
- First National Bank, Tamaqua, Pennsylvania (1907)
- Addition to Mercy Hospital, Wilkes-Barre, Pennsylvania (1907)
- Sts. Cyril and Methodius Church and Residence, Edwardsville, Pennsylvania (1907)
- Town Hall, Coaldale, Pennsylvania (1907)
- St. Mary's Byzantine Catholic Church, Freeland, Pennsylvania (1907)
- Washington Avenue School, Plymouth, Pennsylvania (1908)
- Courtright Avenue School (about 1908)
- Church of the Immaculate Conception, Jim Thorpe, Pennsylvania (dedicated October 4, 1908)
- Church of the Sacred Heart of Jesus and Mary, Scranton, Pennsylvania
- St. Mary's Greek Catholic Church, McAdoo, Pennsylvania
- James M. Coughlin High School, Wilkes-Barre, Pennsylvania (dedicated February 1912)
- Citizens Bank, Freeland, Pennsylvania (completed July 1913)

== Gallery ==
The First National Bank, Nanticoke, Pennsylvania (built 1902-1903)

The C.M. Schwab School in Weatherly, PA (completed 1903)

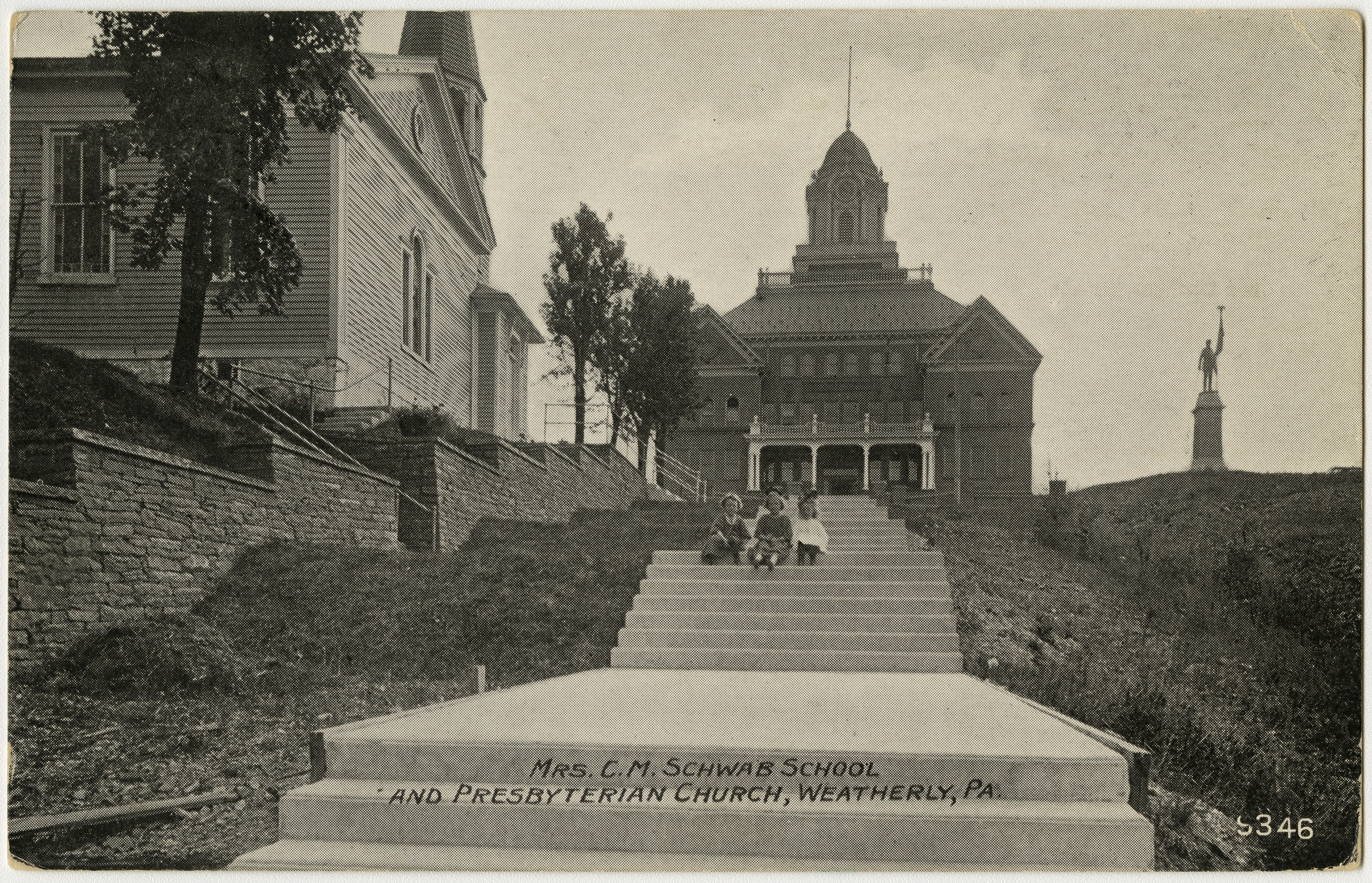
The C.M. Schwab School in Weatherly, PA (completed 1903)

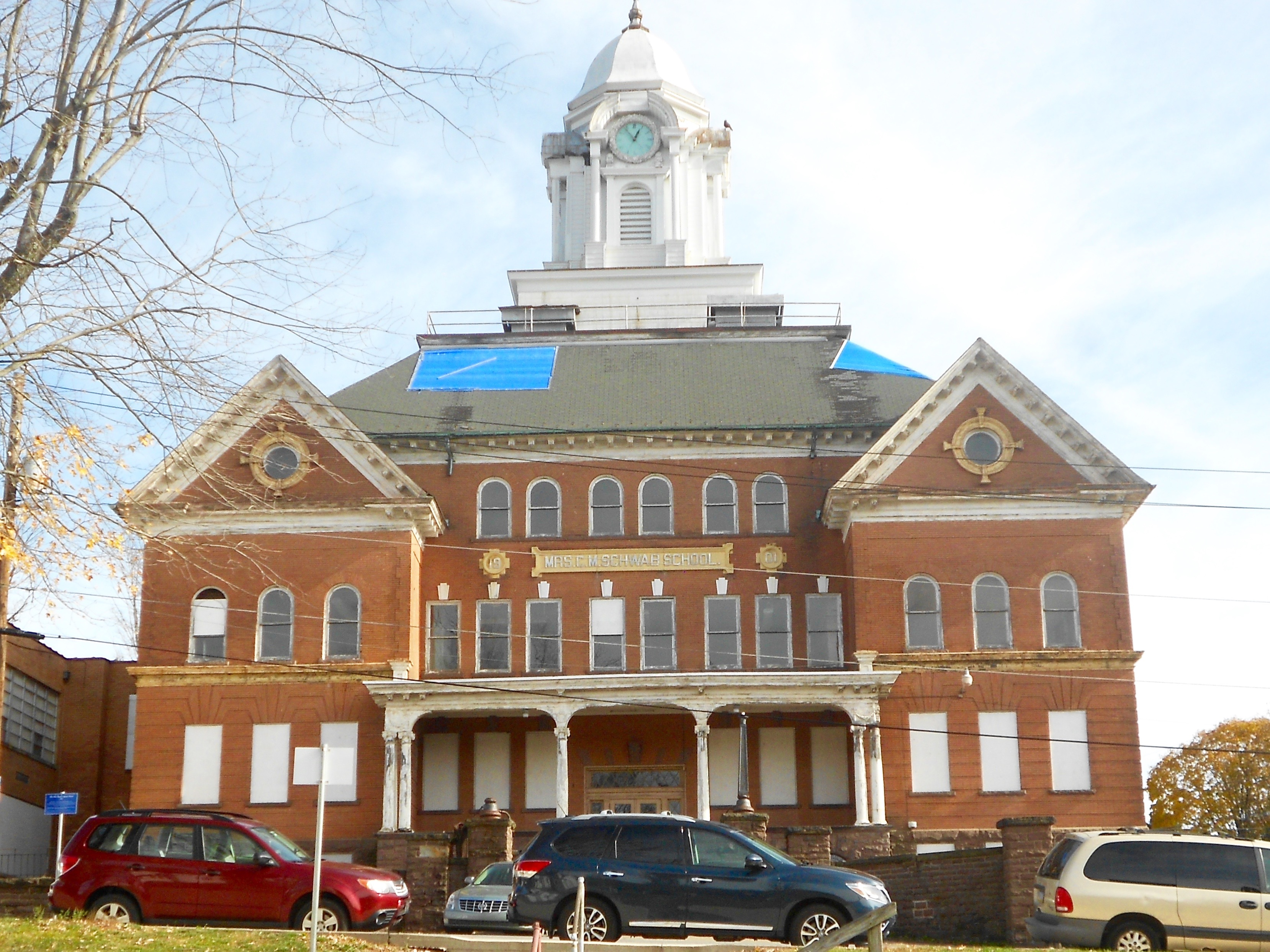
A View of the C.M. Schwab School in 2016

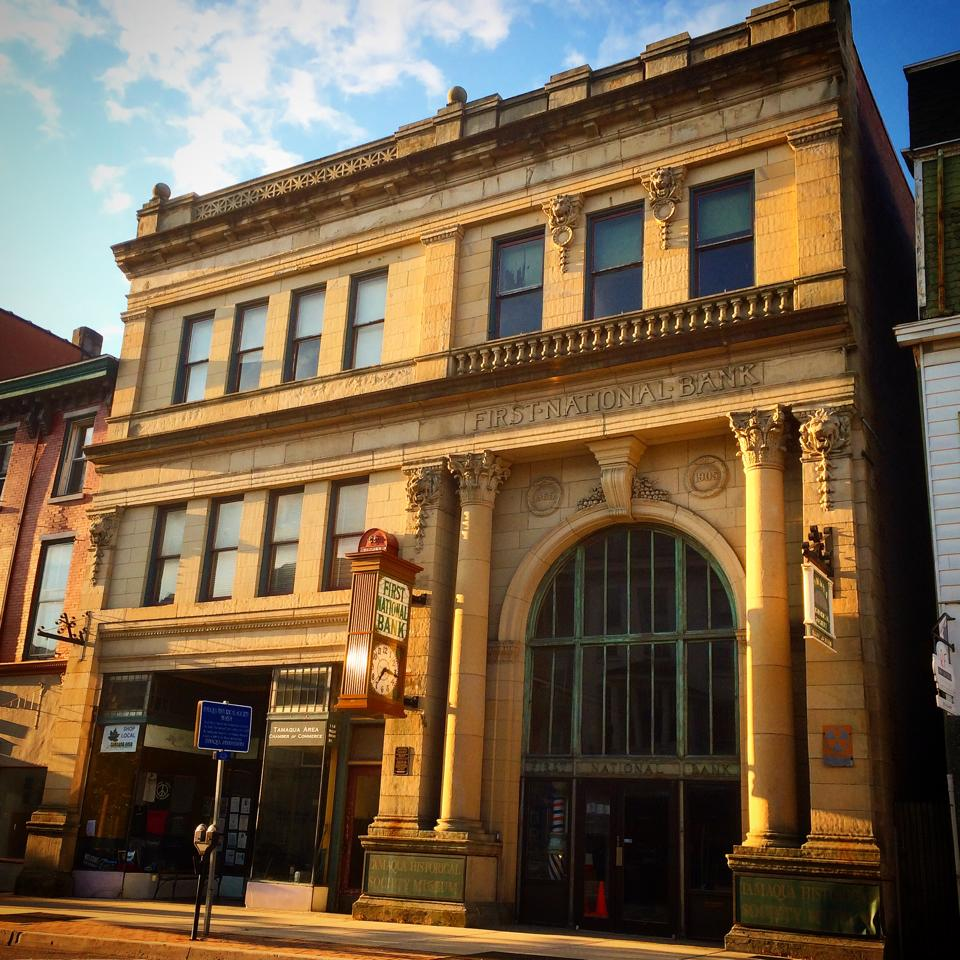
First National Bank, Tamaqua, Pennsylvania (built 1904)

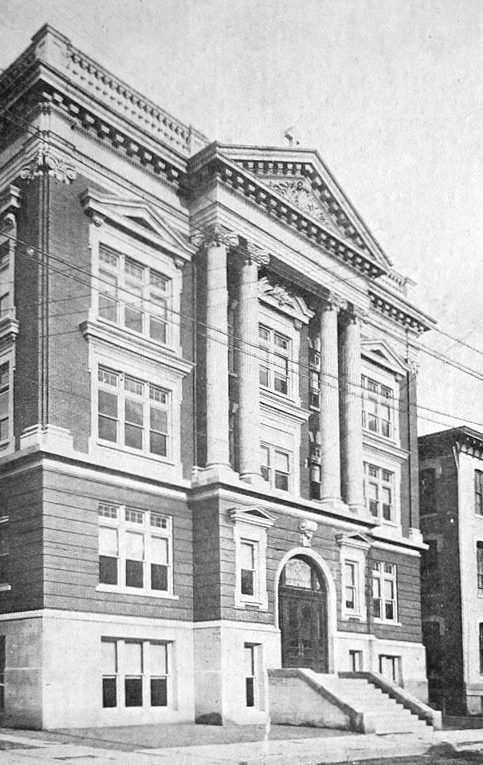
St. Mary's Parochial School, Wilkes-Barre, Pennsylvania (completed in 1905)

St. Vincent's Convent, Plymouth, Pennsylvania (completed in 1905)

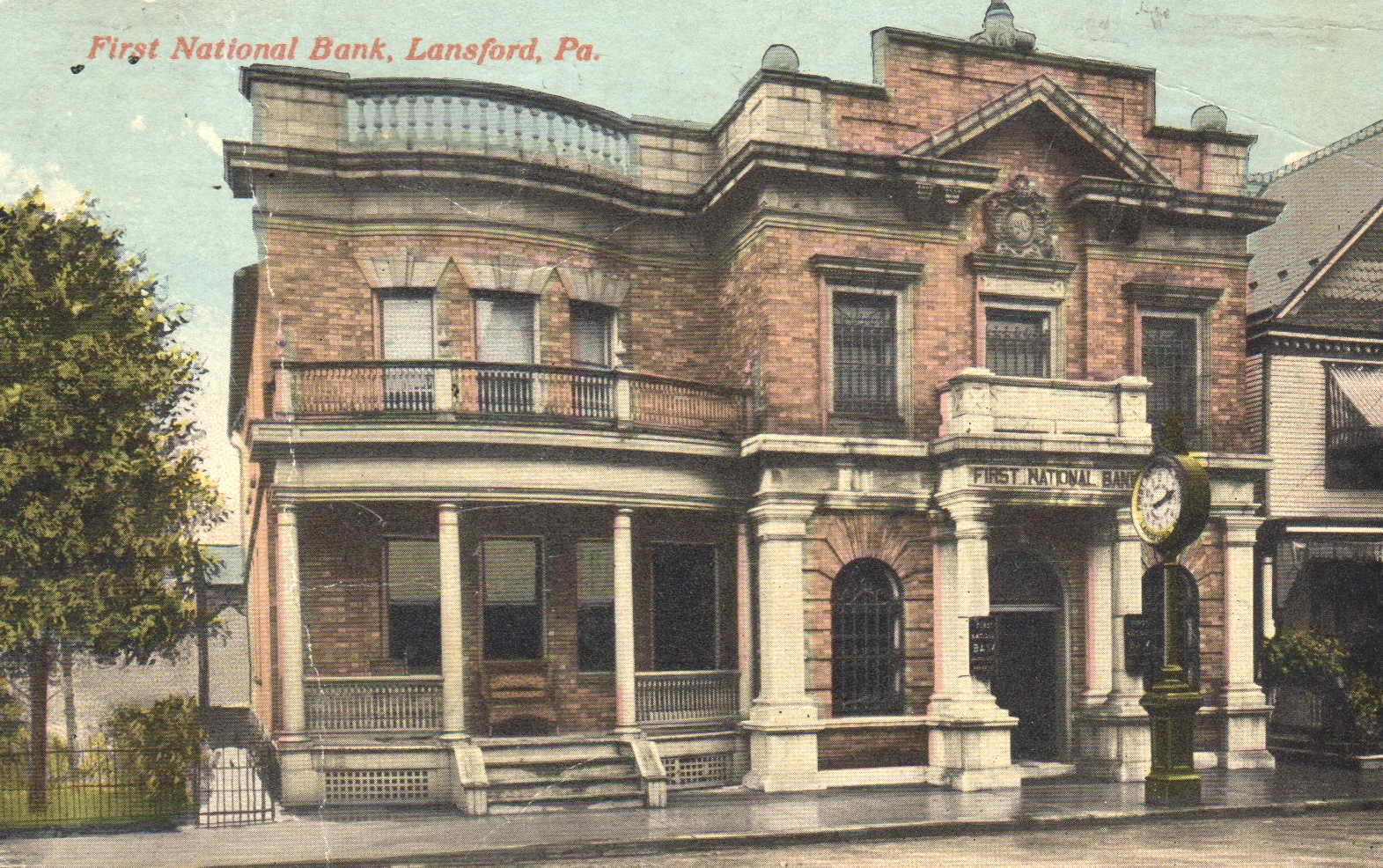
The First National Bank, Lansford, Pennsylvania (completed 1907)

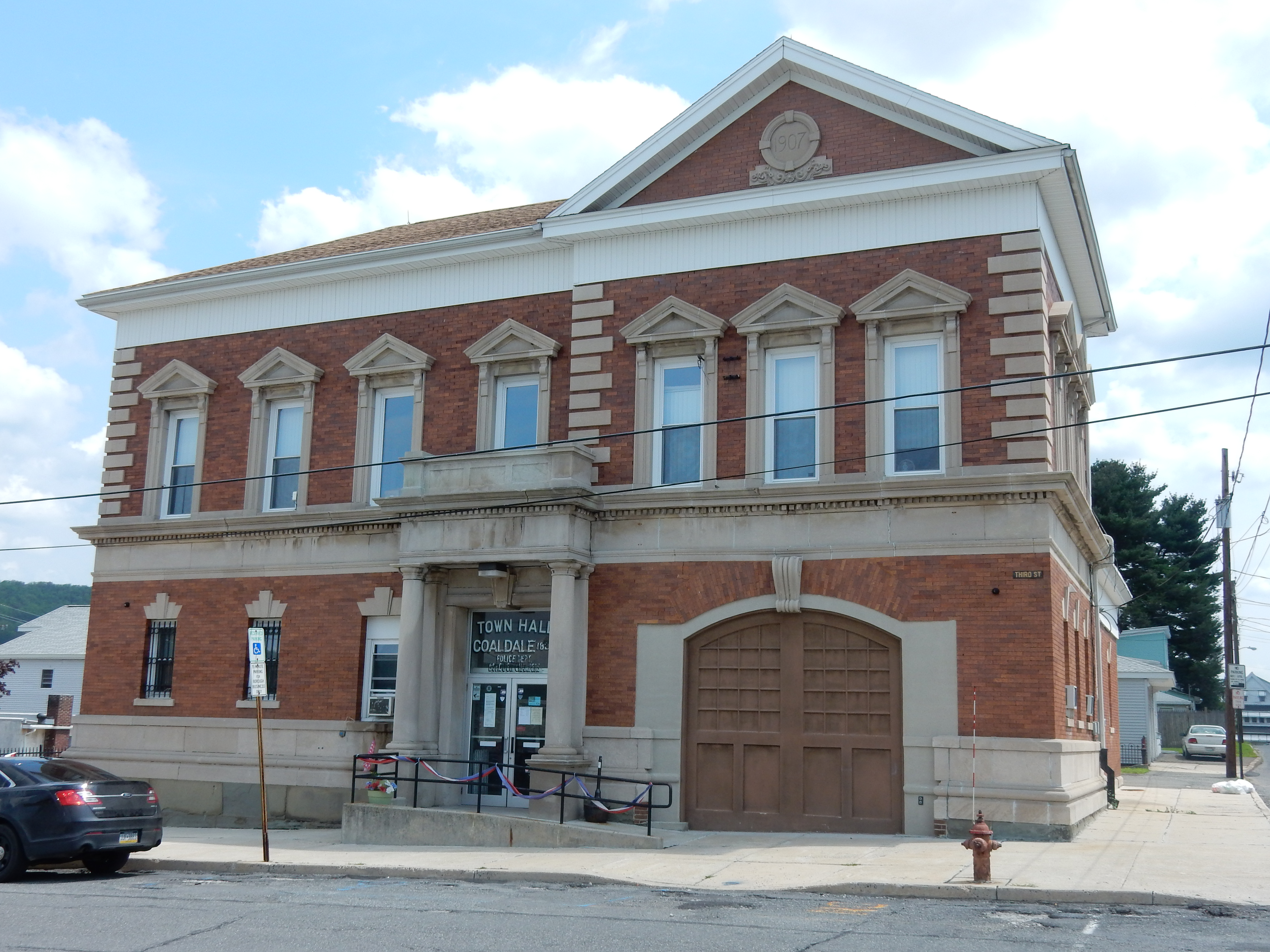
Town Hall, Coaldale, Pennsylvania (completed 1907)

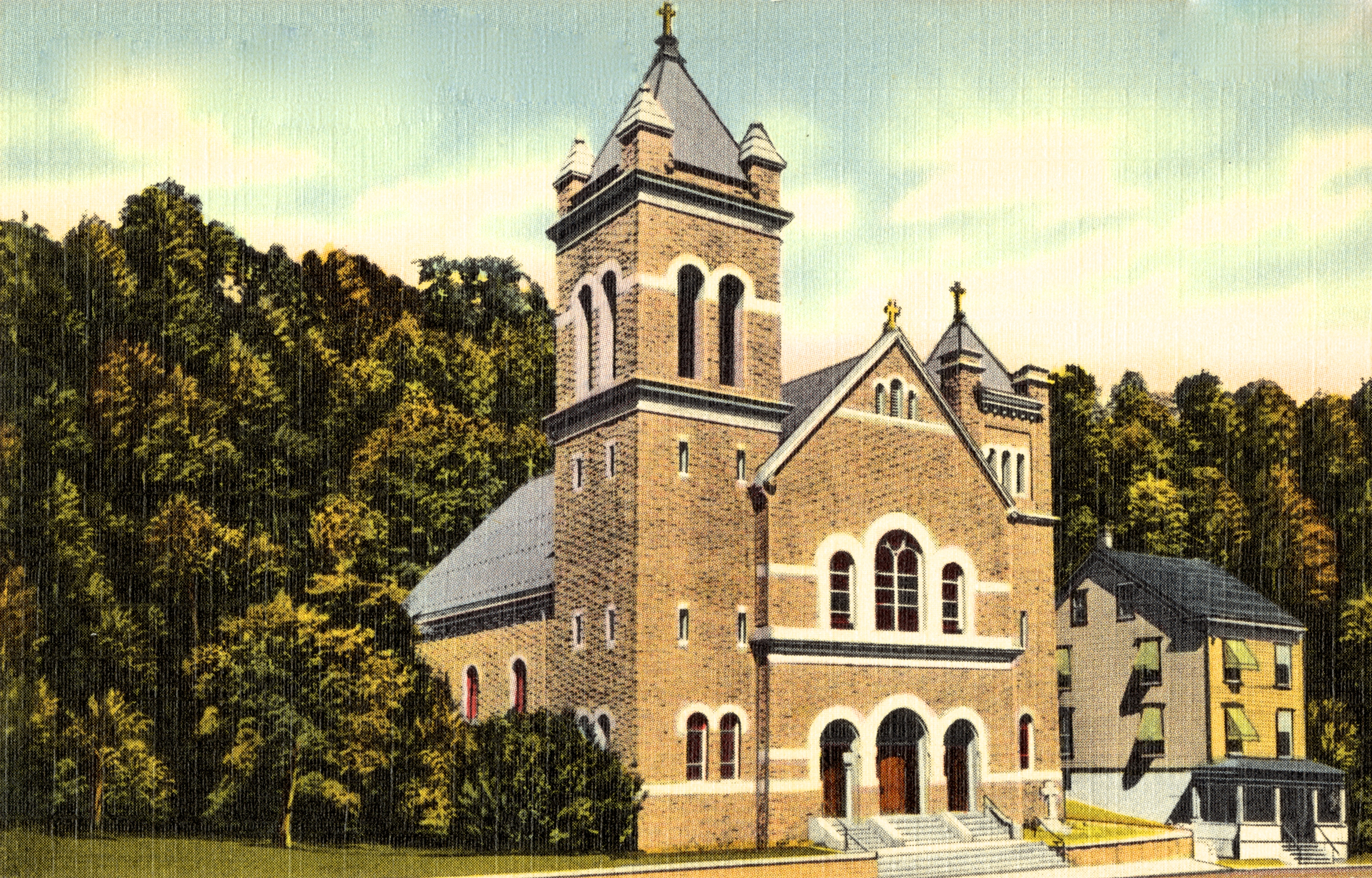
Roman Catholic Church, Jim Thorpe, Pennsylvania (built 1908)

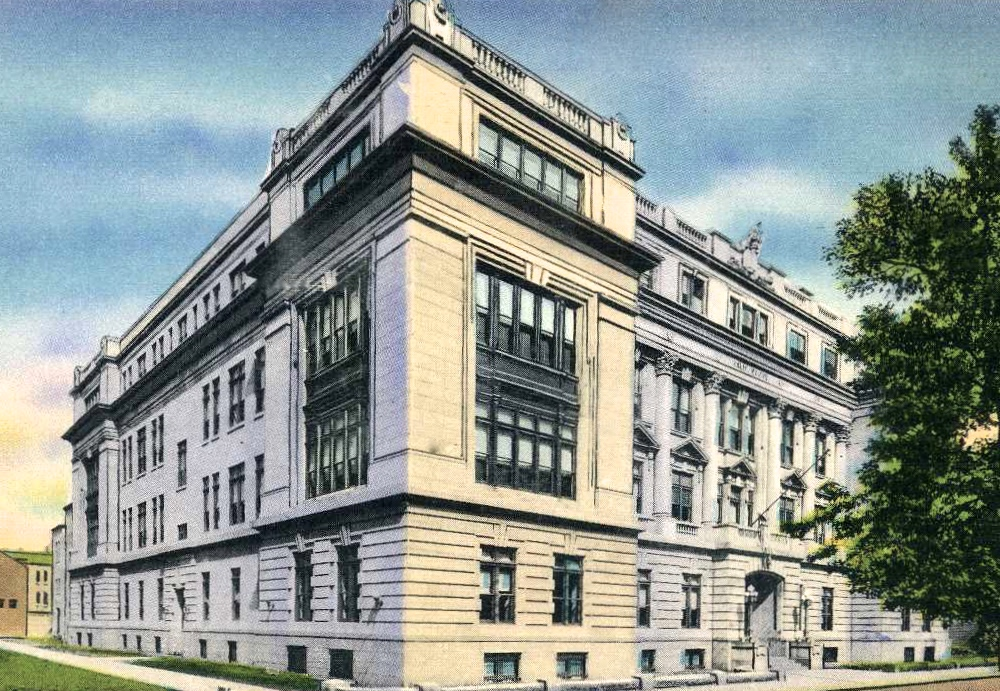
Coughlin High School, Wilkes-Barre, Pennsylvania (completed 1912)

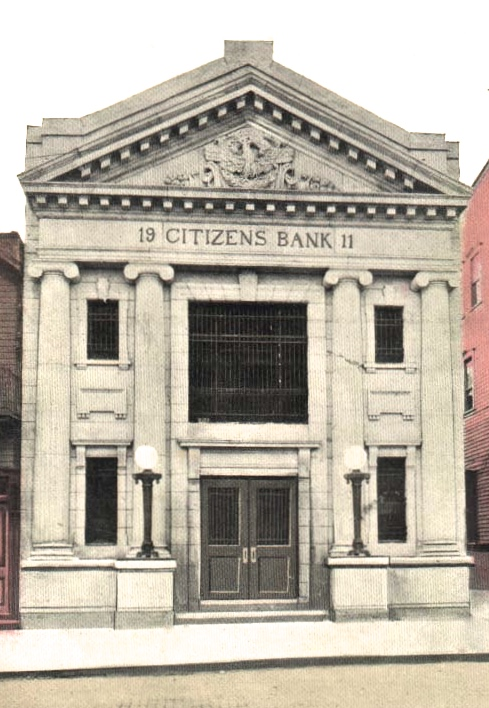
The Citizens Bank, Freeland, Pennsylvania (completed July 1913)

== See also ==
- Architecture of Plymouth, Pennsylvania
- List of American architects
