= Edwardsville =

Edwardsville may refer to:

== Canada ==
- Edwardsville, Nova Scotia

== United Kingdom ==
- Edwardsville, Merthyr Tydfil

== United States ==
- Edwardsville, Alabama
- Edwardsville, Illinois, the most populous place in the US with the name
  - Southern Illinois University Edwardsville
- Edwardsville, Indiana
- Edwardsville, Kansas
- Edwardsville, Ohio
- Edwardsville, Pennsylvania
