= Edward (disambiguation) =

Edward is an English given name.

Edward may also refer to:

- Edward (ballad), a traditional murder ballad
- Edward (EP), by British singer-songwriter Emmy the Great
- Edward (mango), a mango cultivar
- Lake Edward, the smallest of the Great Lakes of Africa
- Rural Municipality of Edward, Manitoba, Canada

== Other ==
- Edward River (disambiguation)
- Edward Gaming

== See also ==
- Edwards (disambiguation)
