= Frederick J. Amsden =

American architect (1841–1906)

Frederick J. Amsden was an architect from Scranton, Pennsylvania. He was a veteran of the Civil War with the rank of captain.

== Life ==
Amsden was born at Rome, New York, on June 19, 1841 to Joel Amsden and Anna Theresa Power.

The family relocated to Scranton in 1850 where his father was employed as resident engineer for the Lackawanna Iron & Coal Co and also laid out the plans for the city.

Amsden was educated in private schools in Scranton. He was then enrolled at the R.E. Rice Academy at Stamford. After leaving school Amsden was employed in his father's civil engineering firm.

During the American Civil War Amsden was first commissioned in 1862 as a lieutenant with 136th Pennsylvania infantry.

Amsden was an officer with the 24th Signal Corps.

After the death of his father in 1868 Amsden took over the family firm. Operating as a city surveyor in the 1870s, he later devoted himself almost entirely to being an architect.

As an Architect is most known for laying out the plans of most Catholic churches in Scranton.

== Personal life ==
Married in 1894 to L. May Davies of Carbondale

== Death ==
Frederick J. Amsden died at Scranton on June 5, 1906.

== Principal Architectural Works ==
- St. Patricks Orphan Asylum in Jermyn,Pennsylvania (built 1880).
- First Central High School, Plymouth, Pennsylvania (built 1884).
- St. Vincent's Church, Plymouth, Pennsylvania (cornerstone 1882; dedicated 1887).
- Town Hall, Plymouth, Pennsylvania (completed 1891).
- Willow Street School, Plymouth, Pennsylvania (completed 1892).
- Rectory, St. Vincent's Church, Plymouth, Pennsylvania (completed 1893).
- St. Stephen's Church, Plymouth, Pennsylvania (dedicated 1894; demolished 1953).
- St. Leo's Church, Ashley, Pennsylvania (cornerstone 1890; dedicated 1897).

== Gallery ==
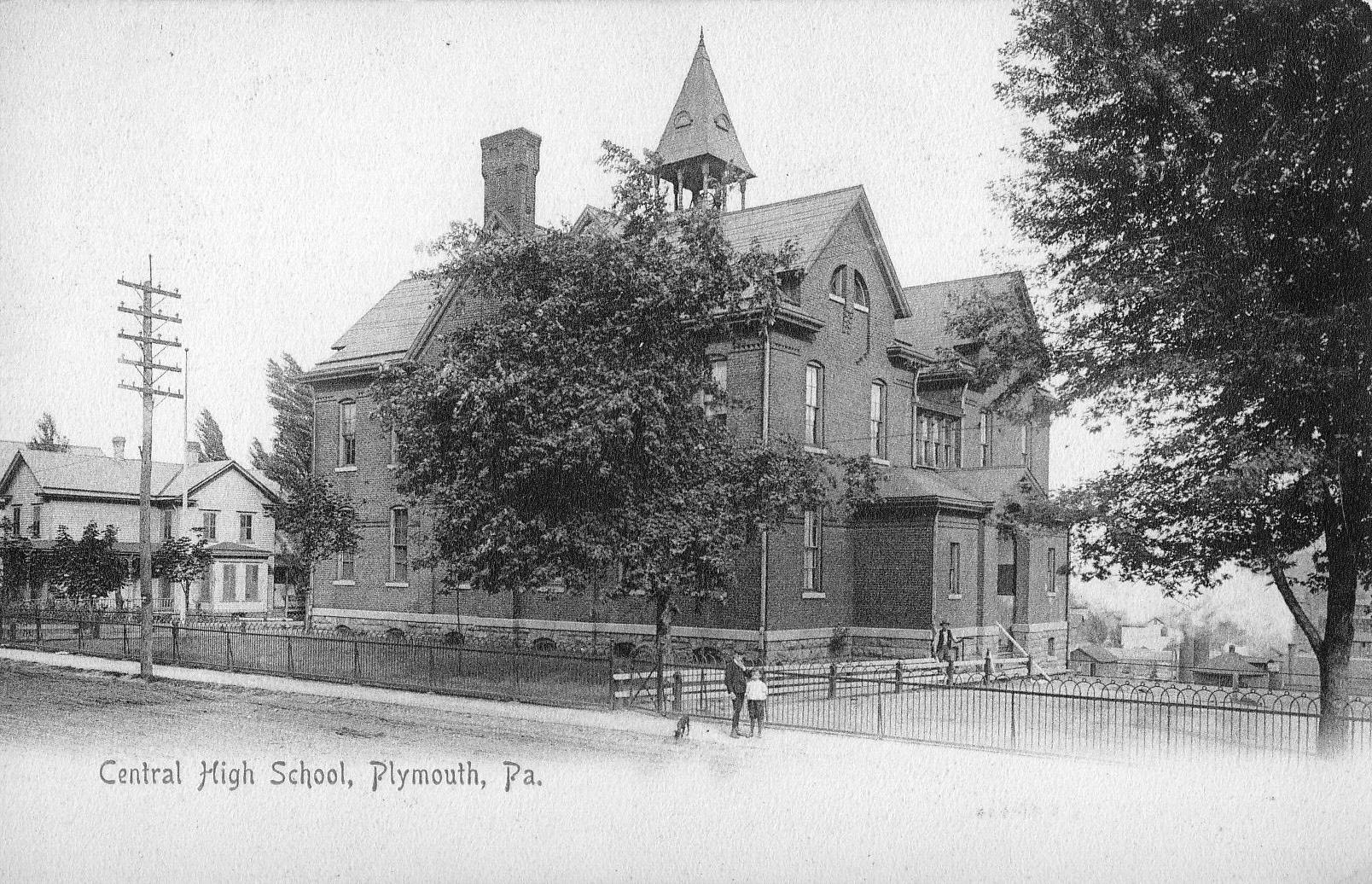
First Central High School, Plymouth, Pennsylvania, built in 1884.

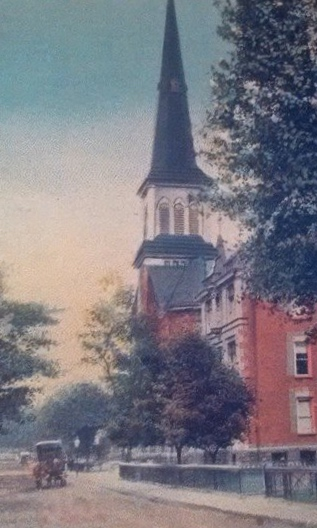
St. Vincent's Church, Plymouth, Pennsylvania, dedicated in 1887.

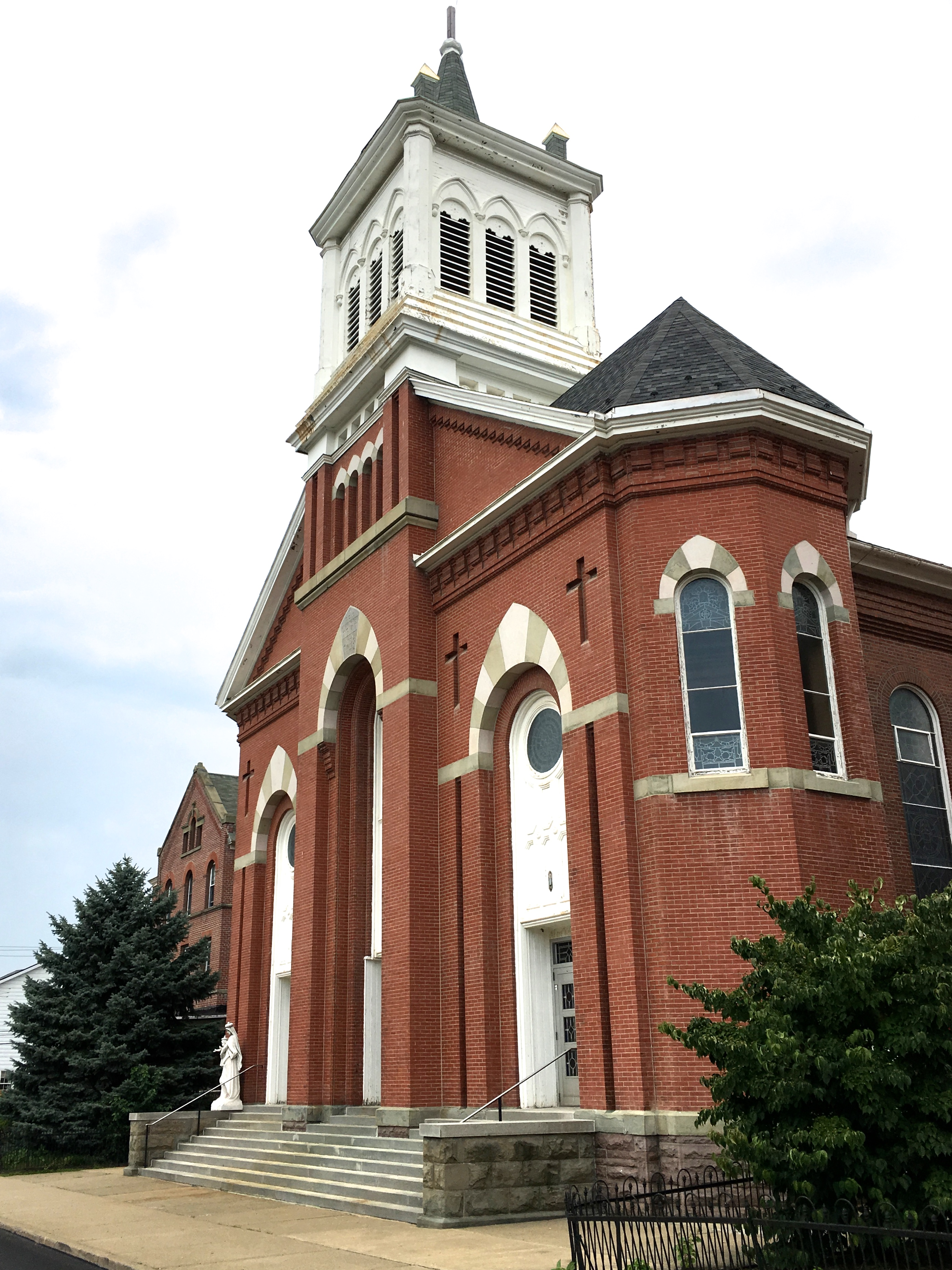
St. Vincent's Church, Plymouth, Pennsylvania, dedicated in 1887.

Town Hall, Plymouth, Pennsylvania, completed in 1891.

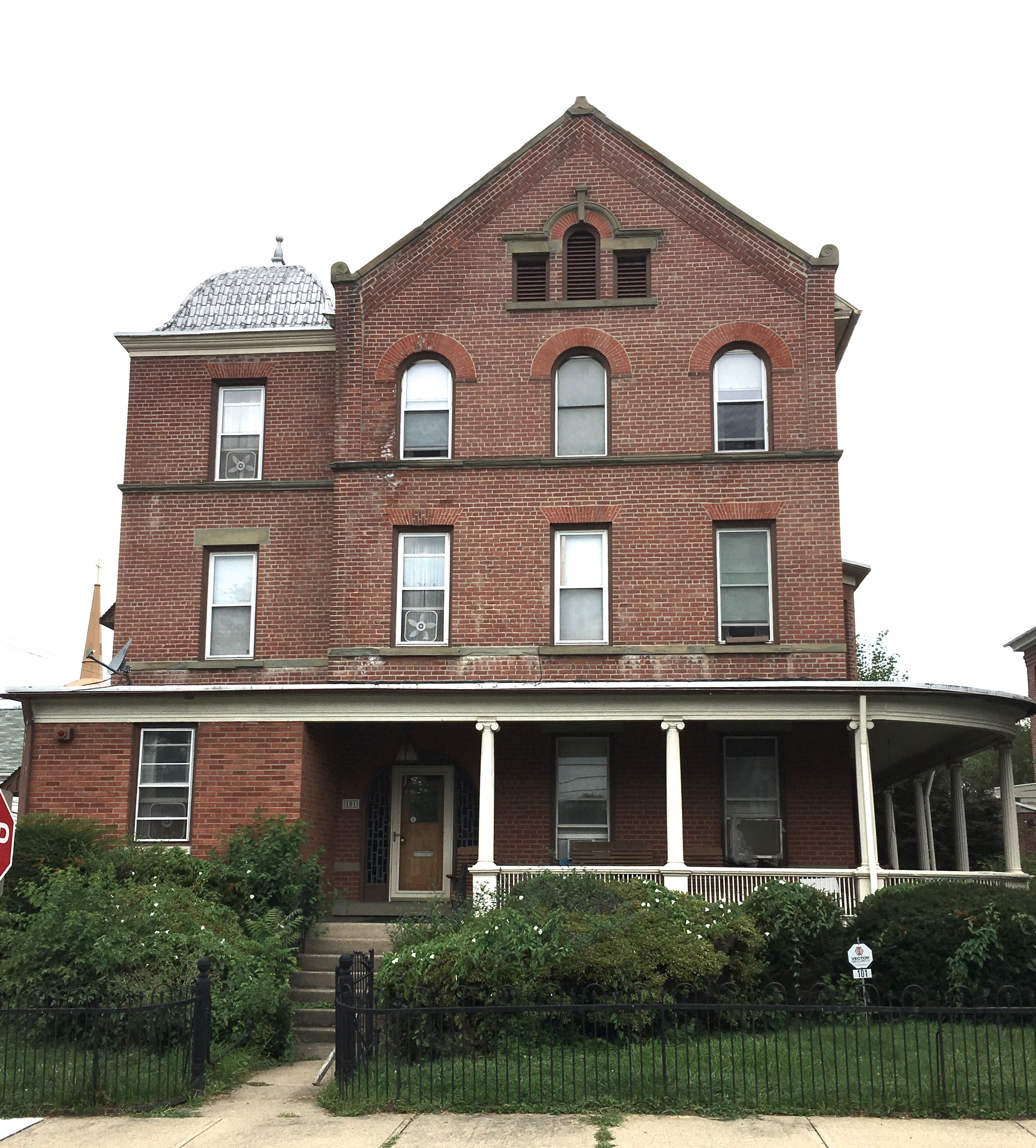
Rectory, St. Vincent's Church, Plymouth, Pennsylvania, completed in 1893.

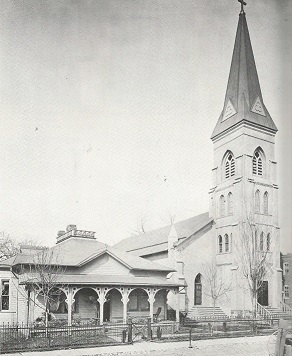
St. Stephen's Church, Plymouth, Pennsylvania, dedicated in 1894.

St. Leo's Church, Ashley, Pennsylvania, completed in 1897.

== See also ==
Architecture of Plymouth, Pennsylvania
