= Edward River (disambiguation) =

Edward River may refer to:

- Edward River, a branch of the Murray River in south western New South Wales, Australia
- Edward River Council, a local government near the river
- Edward River (Queensland), a river in Queensland, Australia
- Edward River, Queensland, a locality in the Shire of Cook, Queensland, Australia

== See also ==
- Edward (disambiguation)
- Edwards River (disambiguation)
