= USS Edwards =

USS Edwards has been the name of more than one United States Navy ship, and may refer to:

- USS Edwards (DD-265), a Clemson-class destroyer in commission from 1919 to 1922 and from 1939 to 1940; transferred to the Royal Navy as HMS Buxton in 1940
- USS Edwards (DD-619), a Gleaves-class destroyer in commission from 1942 to 1946

USS Edwards sometimes can also be used to refer to various other United States Navy ships, including:

- USS John D. Edwards (DD-216), a Clemson-class destroyer in commission from 1920 to 1945
- USS Heywood L. Edwards (DD-663), a Fletcher-class destroyer in commission from 1944 to 1946; transferred to Japan as JDS Ariake (DD-183) in 1959
- USS Ray K. Edwards (DE-237), a Rudderow-class destroyer escort converted during construction into the high-speed transport USS Ray K. Edwards (APD-96)
- USS Ray K. Edwards (APD-96), a Crosley-class high speed transport in commission from 1945 to 1946
- USS Richard S. Edwards (DD-950), a Forrest Sherman-class destroyer in commission from 1959 to 1982
- USS Wilbert A. Edwards (SP-315), also known as USS W. A. Edwards, a patrol vessel in commission from 1917 to 1919
