= Albert Hamilton Kipp =

American architect

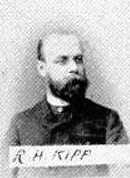
- Born: November 14, 1850; New York, New York
- Died: May 22, 1906 (aged 55); Dallas, Pennsylvania
- Occupation: Architect
- Spouse: Sarah Jennie Scott
- Parent(s): Albert A. Kipp and Mary F. Lunderbilt

Albert Hamilton Kipp (November 14, 1850 – May 22, 1906) was an architect from Wilkes-Barre, Pennsylvania.

== Career ==
Albert Hamilton Kipp was born in New York City on November 14, 1850, but grew up at Mount Pleasant, New York where his step-father, Elijah Bird, worked as a carpenter.

Kipp worked for a few years in New York for James Renwick, before moving to Wilkes-Barre, Pennsylvania in June 1886. He joined forces with Thomas Podmore in December 1886 to form the architecture firm Kipp & Podmore, but the firm dissolved by mutual consent at the end of 1891.

Kipp died at Dallas, Pennsylvania in 1906, and was buried in the Sleepy Hollow Cemetery at Sleepy Hollow, New York.

== Principal architectural works ==
- E. B. Hutchinson Residence, 847 Prospect Place, Crown Heights, Brooklyn, New York, built about 1886.
- Puritan Congregational Church, Wilkes-Barre, Pennsylvania, completed 1887.
- Nelson Memorial Hall, Wyoming Seminary, Kingston, Pennsylvania, built in 1887 — as Kipp & Podmore.
- Methodist Episcopal Church, Dallas, Pennsylvania, completed in 1889 — as Kipp & Podmore.
- Armory, Gaylord Avenue, Plymouth, Pennsylvania, built in 1891 — as Kipp & Podmore.
- State Street School, Nanticoke, Pennsylvania, built in 1891 — as Kipp & Podmore.
- Spalding Library, Athens, Pennsylvania, built in 1897.
- Pettebone Gymnasium, Wyoming Seminary, Kingston, Pennsylvania, built in 1898.
- First National Bank, Public Square, Wilkes-Barre, Pennsylvania, completed in 1906.

== Gallery ==
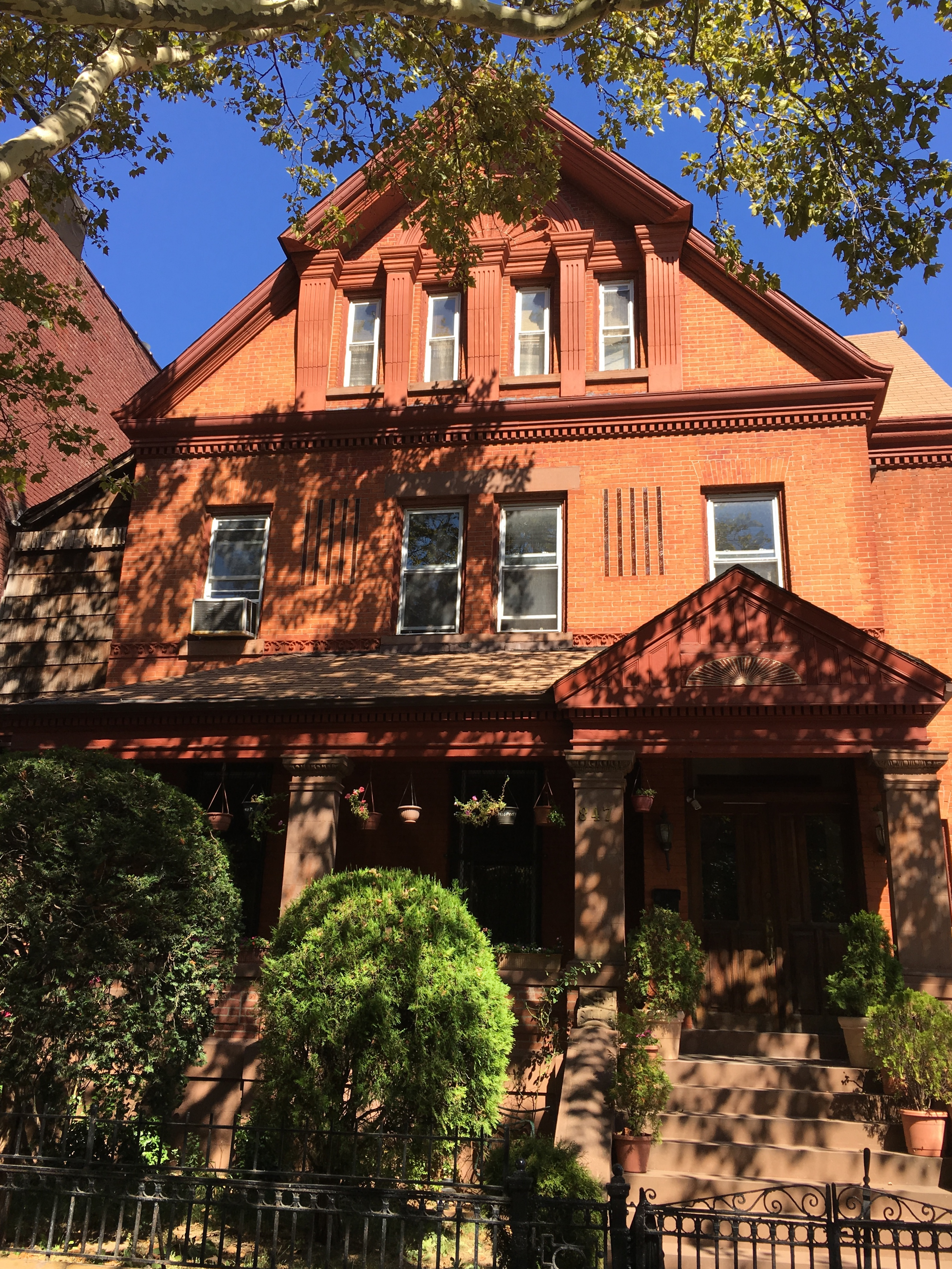
Hutchinson Residence, Crown Heights, Brooklyn, New York, built about 1886.

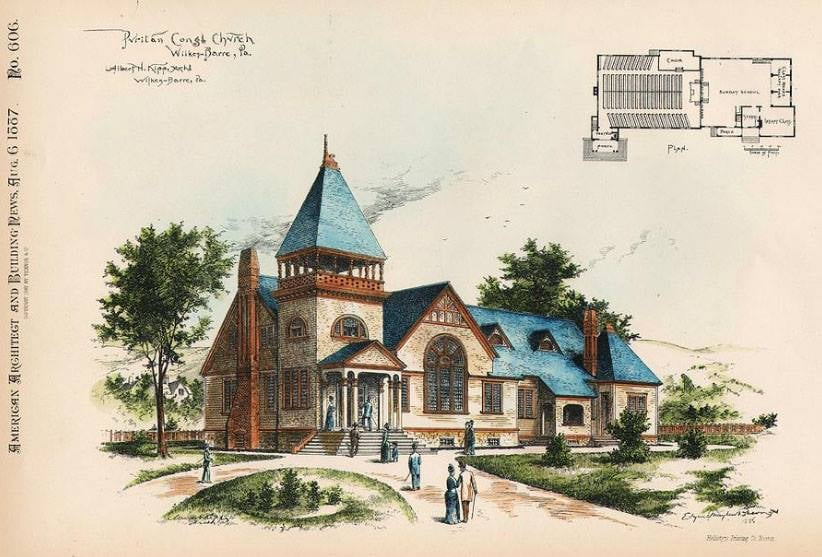
Puritan Congregational Church, Wilkes-Barre, Pennsylvania, completed about 1887.

Nelson Memorial Hall, Wyoming Seminary, Kingston, Pennsylvania, completed 1887.

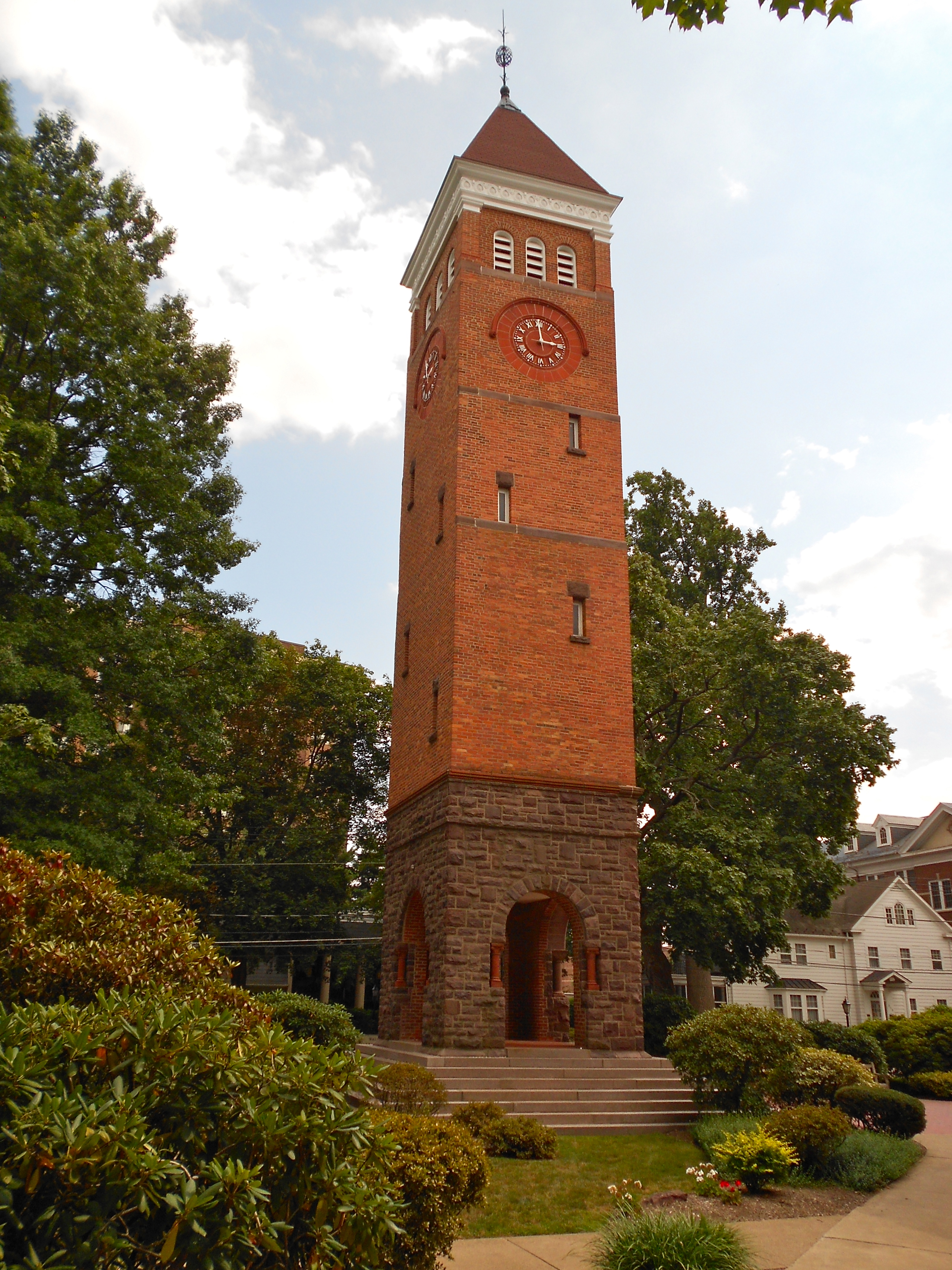
Nelson Memorial, Wyoming Seminary, Kingston, Pennsylvania, photographed in 2013.

Methodist Episcopal Church, Dallas, Pennsylvania, completed 1889.

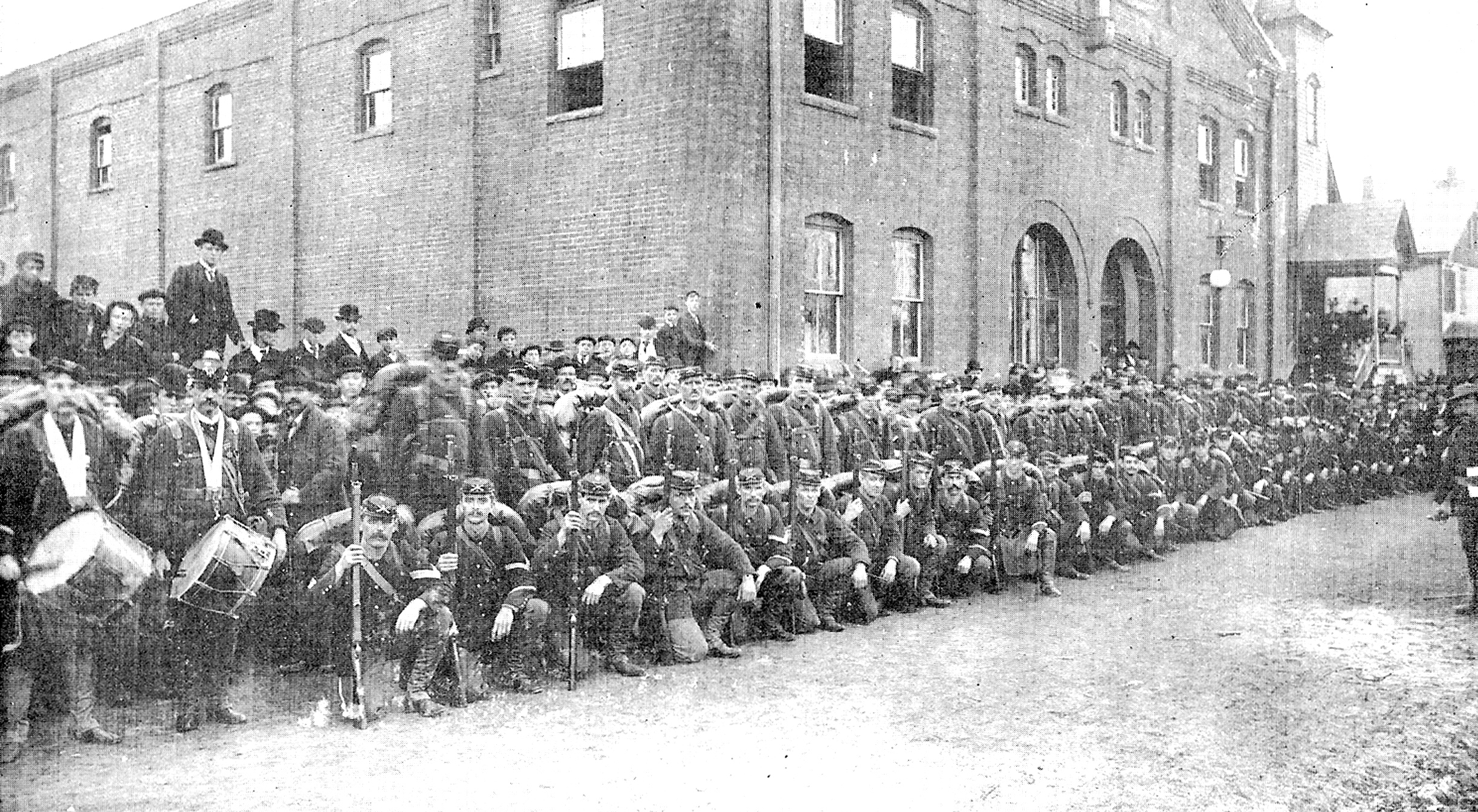
Armory, Gaylord Avenue, Plymouth, Pennsylvania, completed 1891.

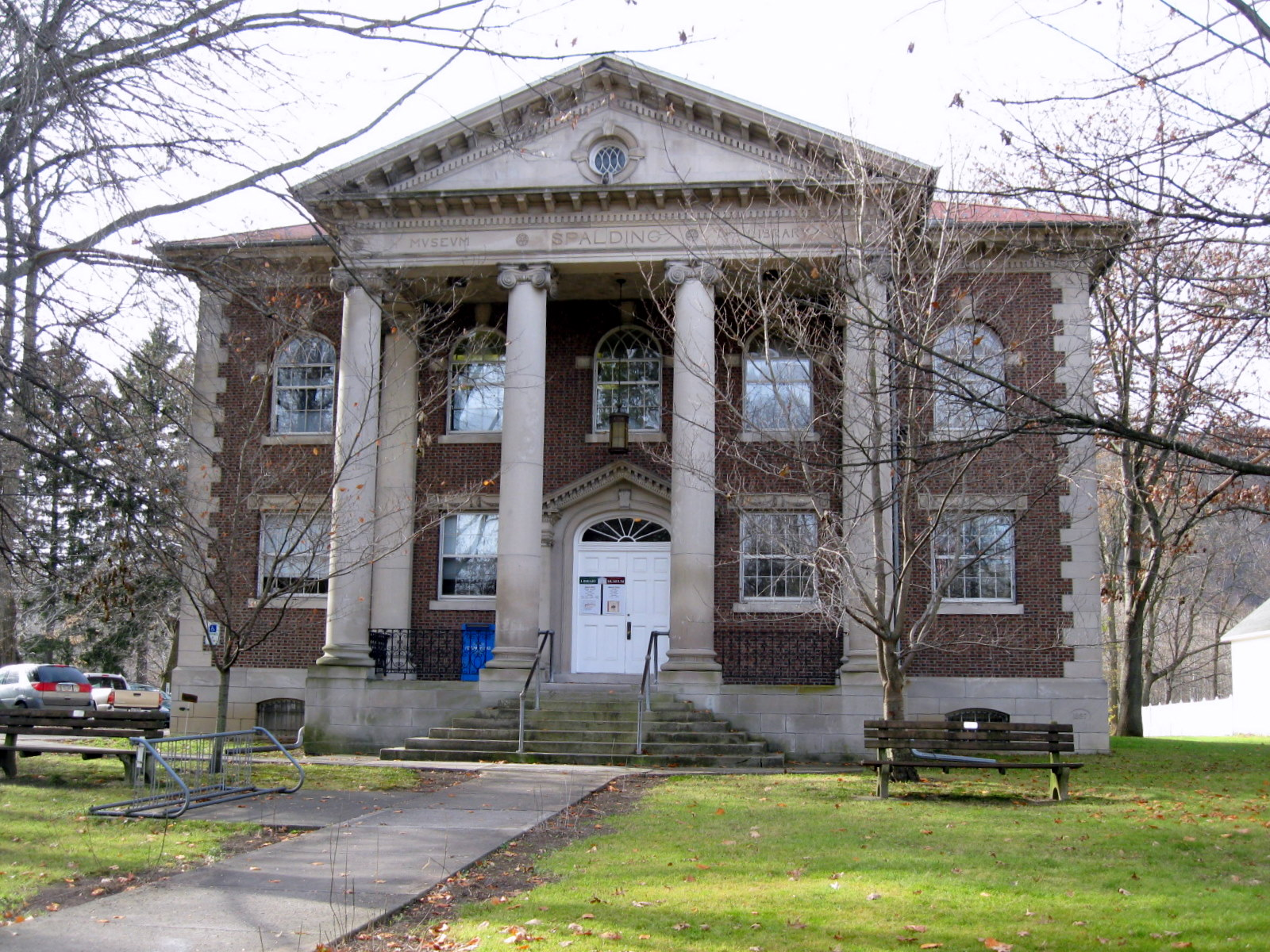
Spalding Memorial Library, Athens, Pennsylvania, completed 1897.

Pettibone Gymnasium, Wyoming Seminary, Kingston, Pennsylvania, built 1898.

== See also ==
- List of American architects
