= Edwardsville, Ohio =

Unincorporated community in Ohio, U.S.

Coordinates: 39°20′13″N 84°01′39″W

Edwardsville is an unincorporated community in Warren County, in the U.S. state of Ohio. Edwardsville is the oldest community in Harlan Township.

== History ==
Edwardsville was laid out in 1824 by Edward Thomas, and named for him. A post office called Edwardsville was established in 1825, and remained in operation until 1901.
