= Edwardsville, Pennsylvania =

Borough in Pennsylvania, US

- Borough
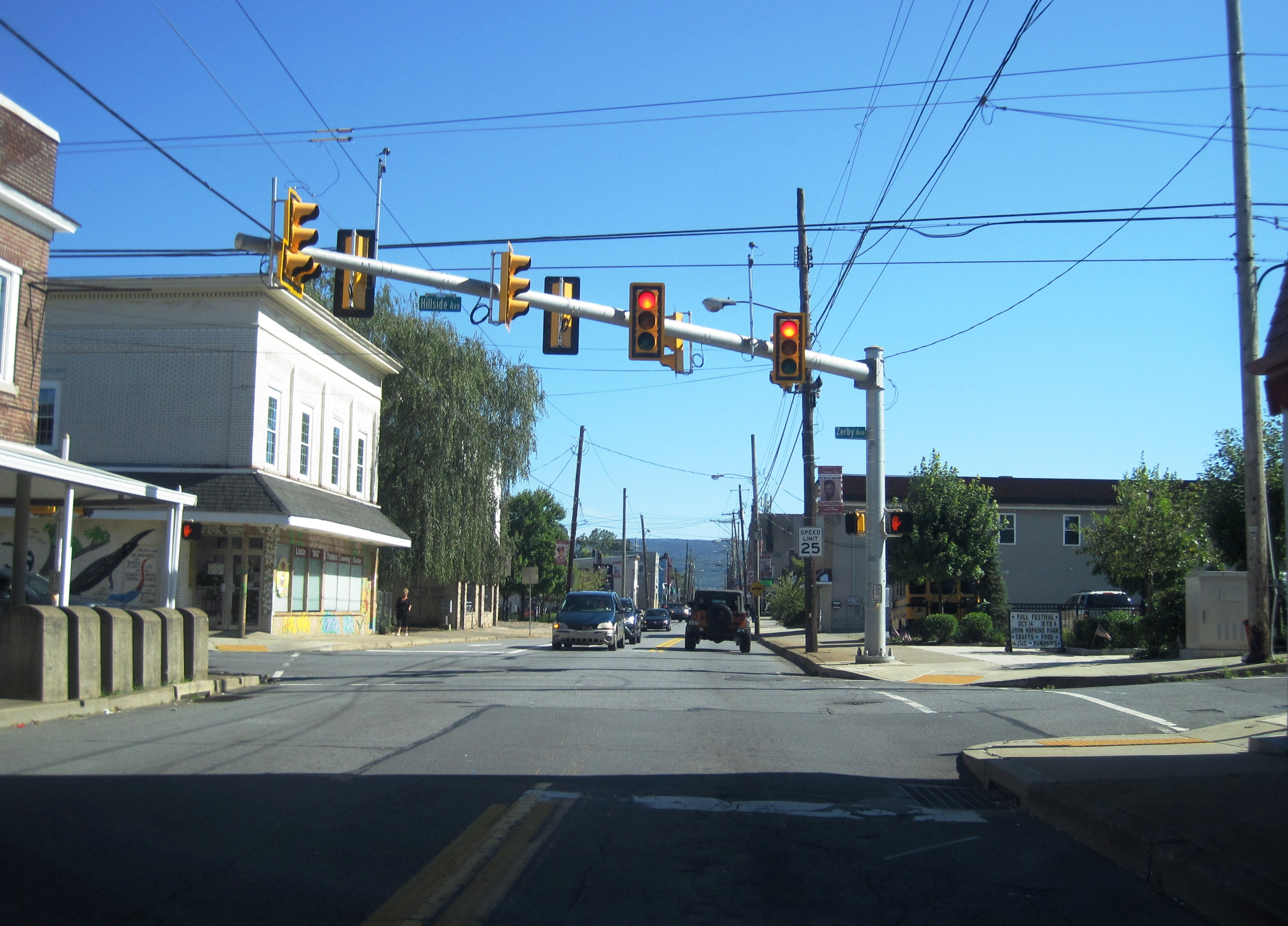
- Main Street in Edwardsville

- Location of Edwardsville in Luzerne County, Pennsylvania.

- Location within Pennsylvania Location within the United States
- Coordinates: 41°15′58″N 75°54′30″W
- Country: United States
- State: Pennsylvania
- County: Luzerne
- Settled: 1768
- Incorporated: 1884

Government
  - Type: Mayor-Council
  - Mayor: Sherri Dubaskas Cordes

Area
  - Total: 1.24 sq mi (3.20 km^{2})
  - Land: 1.19 sq mi (3.07 km^{2})
  - Water: 0.050 sq mi (0.13 km^{2})

Population (2020)
  - Total: 4,929
  - Density: 4,160.6/sq mi (1,606.43/km^{2})
- Time zone: UTC-5 (Eastern (EST))
  - Summer (DST): UTC-4 (EDT)
- Zip code: 18704
- Area code: 570
- FIPS code: 42-22672
- Website: www.edwardsvilleborough.com

Edwardsville is a borough in Luzerne County, Pennsylvania, United States. The population was 4,918 at the 2020 census.

== History ==
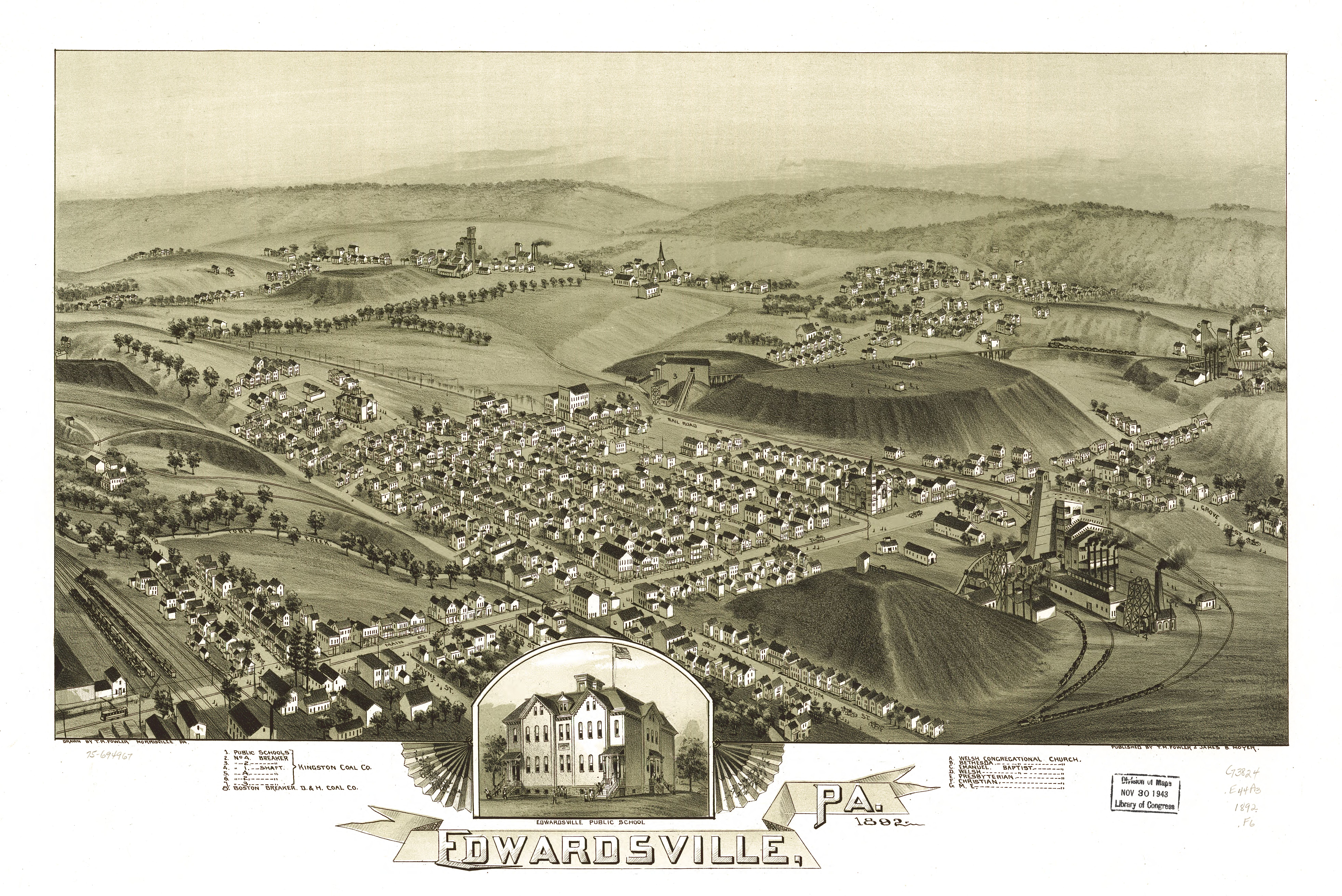
Edwardsville in 1892

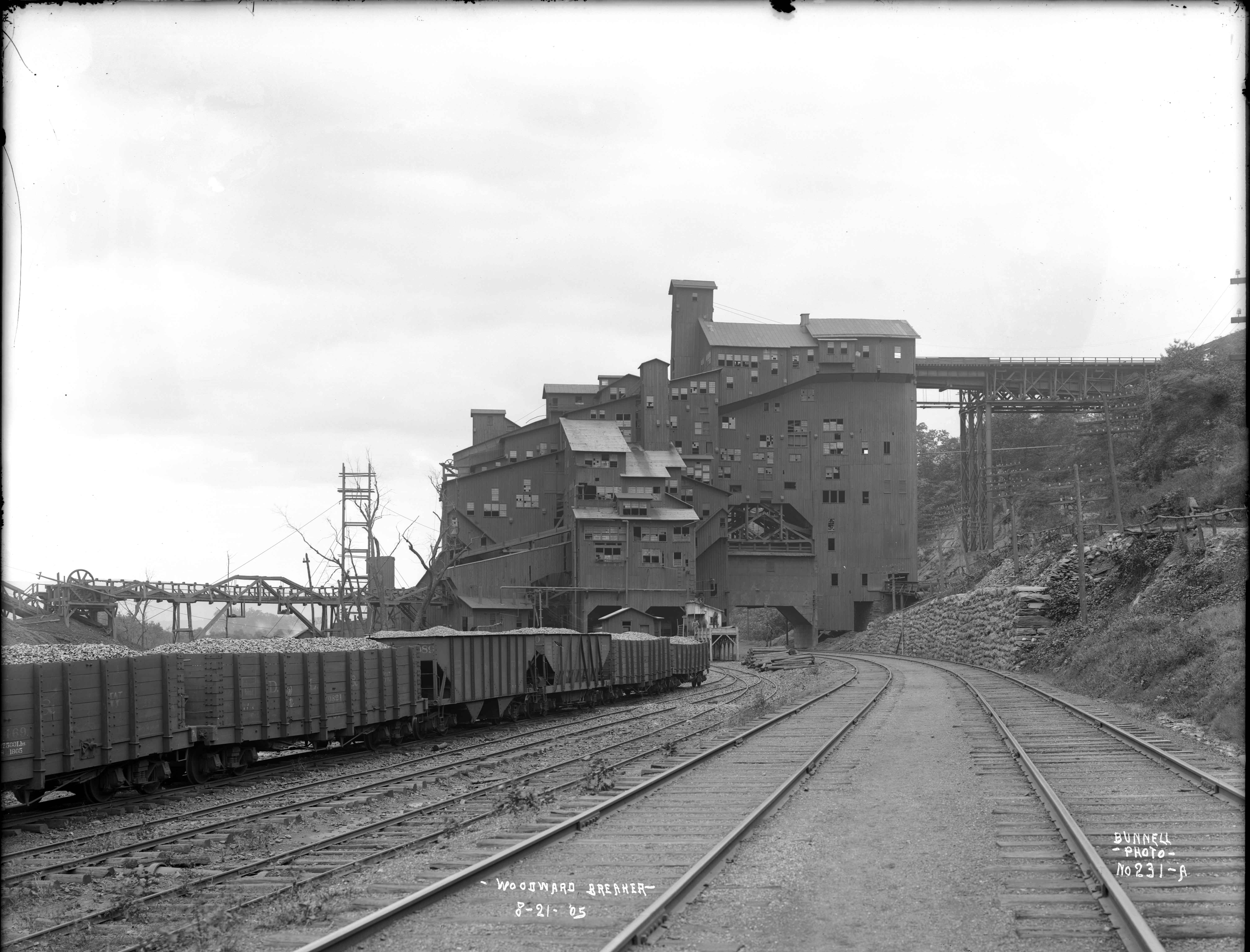
Coal breaker in Edwardsville

The area was first settled in 1768 by pioneers from Connecticut during the era of the Susquehanna Company’s expansion. For much of its early years, the settlement was a quiet agricultural and milling outpost; one of its earliest industrial landmarks was Moneypenny’s Mill, a significant grain mill and inn built by William Moneypenny to serve travelers crossing the Susquehanna River.

Beyond coal, Edwardsville became regionally famous for its brewing industry. In 1889, the Bartels Brewing Company was established in the borough, eventually becoming one of the most prominent breweries in Northeastern Pennsylvania. Known for its "Professor" mascot and high-quality lagers, Bartels provided significant employment and served as a cornerstone of local commerce until the mid-20th century. During this peak period, the borough was also a vital stop on the regional electric trolley lines, linking residents to the neighboring urban centers of Wilkes-Barre and Kingston.

The mid-20th century brought the inevitable decline of the coal industry, a shift that hit Edwardsville particularly hard. The Knox Mine Disaster of 1959, though occurring nearby, effectively signaled the end of deep mining in the Wyoming Valley, leading to a long period of economic restructuring. Today, Edwardsville has transitioned into a residential and retail-focused community. While the coal breakers are gone, the borough remains a key part of the Wilkes-Barre metropolitan area, characterized by its dense suburban feel and a modern economy driven by healthcare, retail, and local services.

== Geography ==
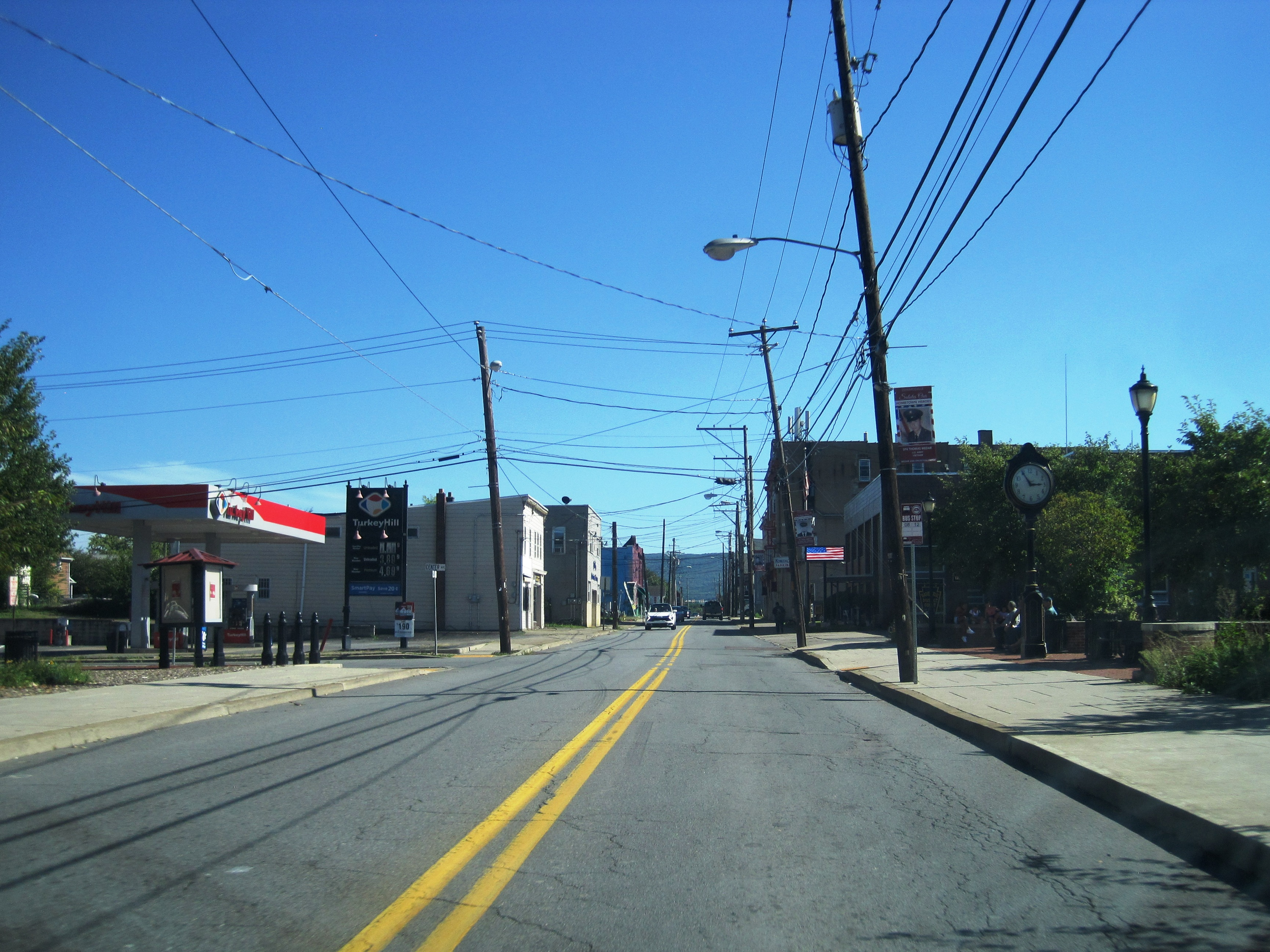
Main Street, Edwardsville

Edwardsville is located at 41°15′58″N 75°54′30″W (41.266081, -75.908457).

According to the United States Census Bureau, the borough has a total area of 1.2 square miles (3.1 km^{2}), of which 1.2 square miles (3.0 km^{2}) is land and 0.04 square miles (0.1 km^{2}), or 2.95%, is water. The Susquehanna River makes up the borough's southern border.

=== Transportation ===
U.S. Route 11 is the only major highway running through Edwardsville.

== Demographics ==
Historical population
| Census | Pop. | Note | %± |
|---|---|---|---|
| 1890 | 3,284 | | — |
| 1900 | 5,165 | | 57.3% |
| 1910 | 8,407 | | 62.8% |
| 1920 | 9,027 | | 7.4% |
| 1930 | 8,847 | | −2.0% |
| 1940 | 7,998 | | −9.6% |
| 1950 | 6,686 | | −16.4% |
| 1960 | 5,711 | | −14.6% |
| 1970 | 5,633 | | −1.4% |
| 1980 | 5,729 | | 1.7% |
| 1990 | 5,399 | | −5.8% |
| 2000 | 4,984 | | −7.7% |
| 2010 | 4,816 | | −3.4% |
| 2020 | 4,929 | | 2.3% |
| 2021 (est.) | 4,911 | ▼ | −0.4% |

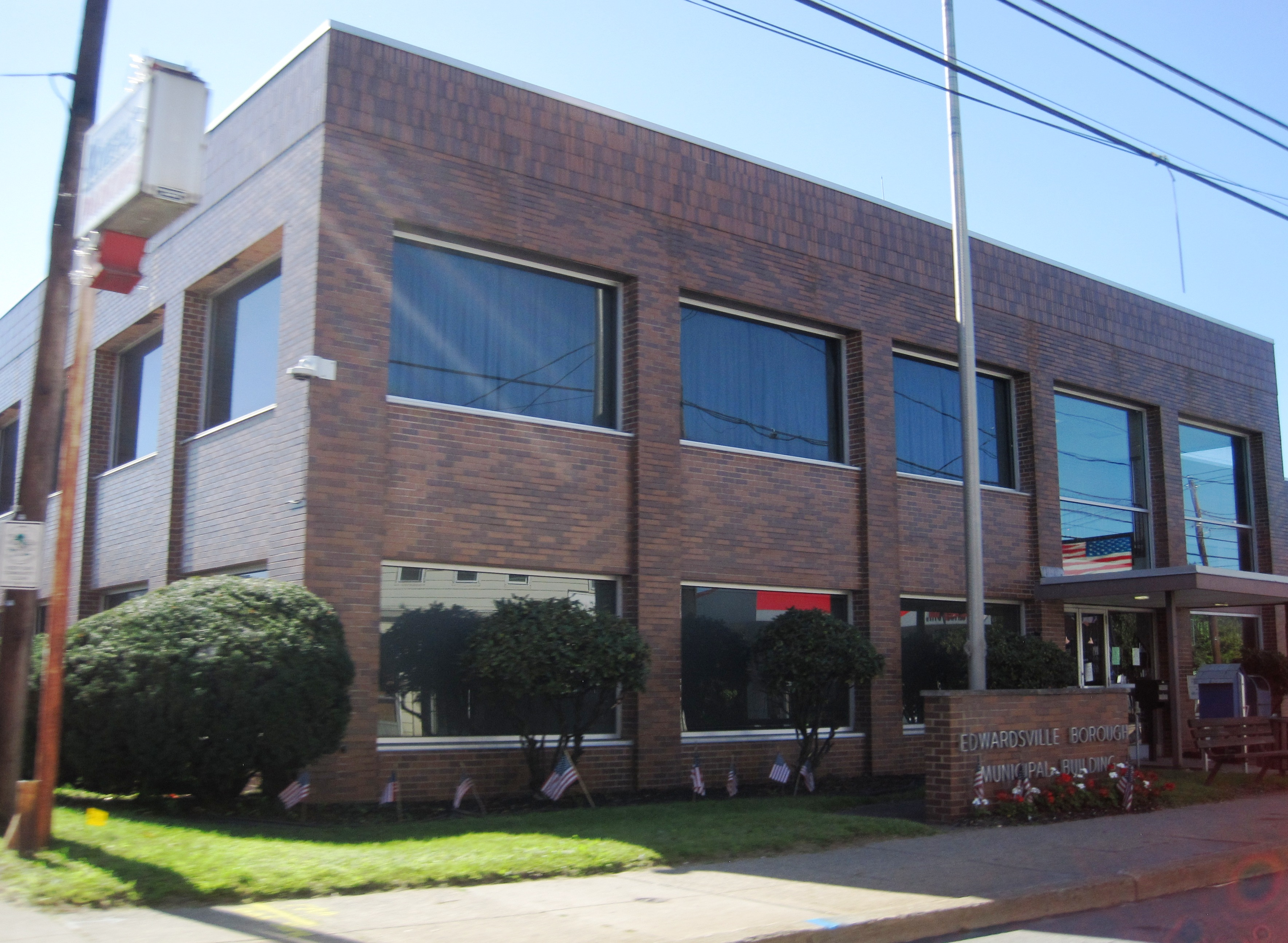
Edwardsville Borough Hall

=== 2020 census ===
As of the 2020 census, Edwardsville had a population of 4,929. The median age was 38.2 years. 23.8% of residents were under the age of 18 and 18.5% were 65 years of age or older.

For every 100 females, there were 84.5 males, and for every 100 females age 18 and over, there were 77.7 males age 18 and over.

100.0% of residents lived in urban areas, while 0.0% lived in rural areas.

There were 2,259 households in Edwardsville, of which 29.3% had children under the age of 18 living in them. Of all households, 24.9% were married-couple households, 21.7% were households with a male householder and no spouse or partner present, and 44.9% were households with a female householder and no spouse or partner present. About 39.2% of all households were made up of individuals and 18.4% had someone living alone who was 65 years of age or older.

There were 2,556 housing units, of which 11.6% were vacant. The homeowner vacancy rate was 1.6% and the rental vacancy rate was 6.7%.

Racial composition as of the 2020 census
| Race | Number | Percent |
|---|---|---|
| White | 3,508 | 71.2% |
| Black or African American | 767 | 15.6% |
| American Indian and Alaska Native | 19 | 0.4% |
| Asian | 40 | 0.8% |
| Native Hawaiian and Other Pacific Islander | 0 | 0.0% |
| Some other race | 193 | 3.9% |
| Two or more races | 402 | 8.2% |
| Hispanic or Latino (of any race) | 532 | 10.8% |

=== 2000 census ===
As of the census of 2000, there were 4,984 people, 2,345 households, and 1,280 families living in the borough. The population density was 4,233.5 inhabitants per square mile (1,634.6/km^{2}). There were 2,587 housing units at an average density of 2,197.4 per square mile (848.4/km^{2}).

The racial makeup of the borough was 95.43% White, 2.57% African American, 0.30% Native American, 0.30% Asian, 0.36% from other races, and 1.04% from two or more races. Hispanic or Latino of any race were 1.18% of the population.

There were 2,345 households, out of which 26.6% had children under the age of 18 living with them, 31.2% were married couples living together, 18.9% had a female householder with no husband present, and 45.4% were non-families. 41.1% of all households were made up of individuals, and 21.3% had someone living alone who was 65 years of age or older. The average household size was 2.09 and the average family size was 2.81.

In the borough the population was spread out, with 22.7% under the age of 18, 8.8% from 18 to 24, 26.7% from 25 to 44, 20.6% from 45 to 64, and 21.2% who were 65 years of age or older. The median age was 38 years. For every 100 females there were 78.8 males. For every 100 females age 18 and over, there were 73.0 males.

The median income for a household in the borough was $20,000, and the median income for a family was $26,908. Males had a median income of $25,733 versus $21,657 for females. The per capita income for the borough was $13,464. About 26.9% of families and 25.9% of the population were below the poverty line, including 34.6% of those under age 18 and 28.1% of those age 65 or over.

== Education ==
It is in the Wyoming Valley West School District.
