= Coal Creek (Susquehanna River tributary) =

Stream in Pennsylvania, United States

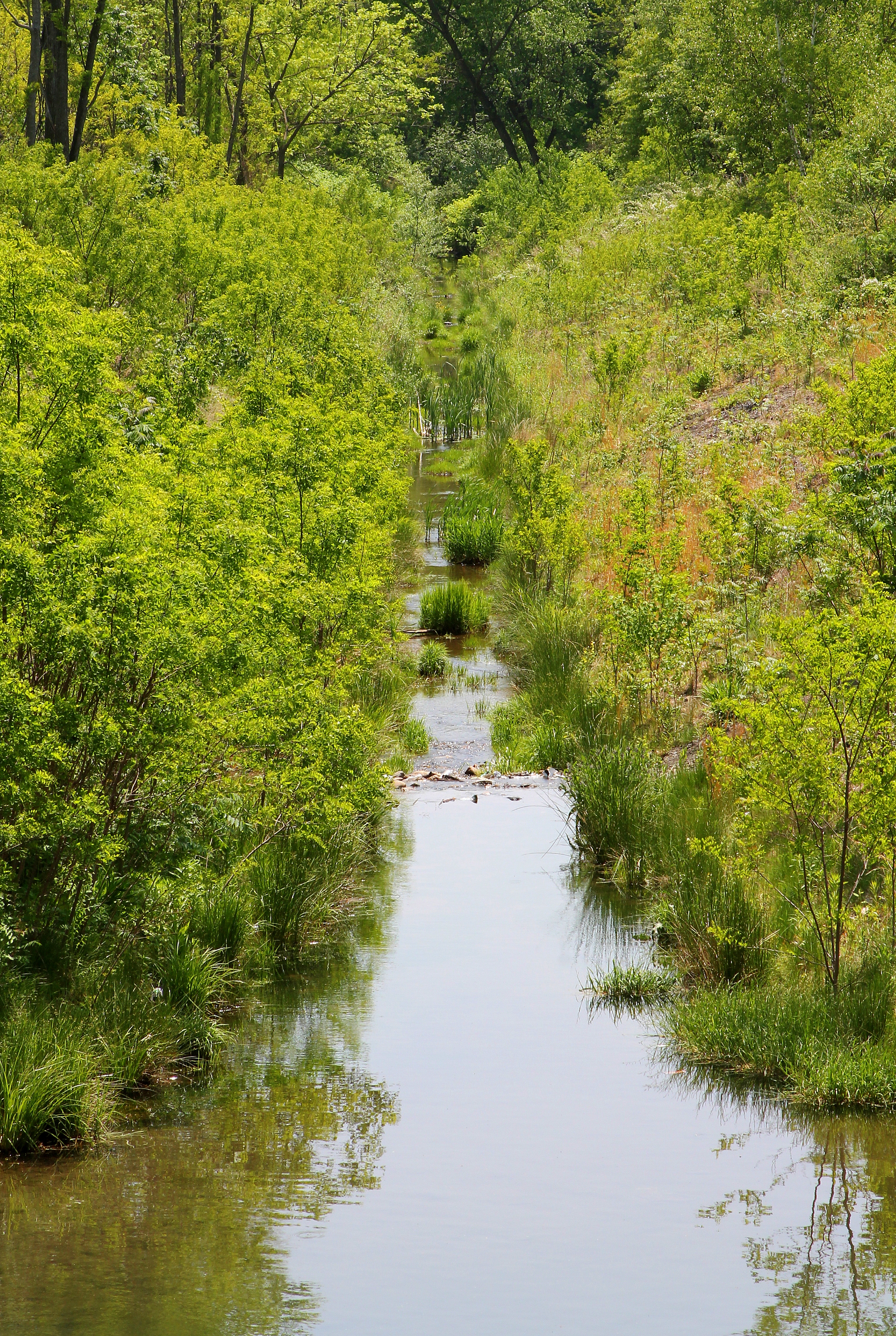
- Coal Creek looking downstream in its lower reaches

Physical characteristics
- Source
  - location: valley near the northern border of Plymouth Township, Luzerne County, Pennsylvania
  - elevation: between 1,400 and 1,420 feet (430 and 430 m)
- Mouth
  - location: Susquehanna River in Plymouth, Luzerne County, Pennsylvania
  - coordinates: 41°13′45″N 75°57′23″W
  - elevation: 515 ft (157 m)
- Length: 2.9 mi (4.7 km)
- Basin size: 1.46 mi^{2} (3.8 km^{2})
- Discharge
  - average: often dry

Basin features
- Progression: Susquehanna River → Chesapeake Bay

Coal Creek is a tributary of the Susquehanna River in Luzerne County, Pennsylvania, in the United States. It is approximately 2.9 miles (4.7 km) long and flows through Plymouth Township and Plymouth. The watershed of the creek has an area of 1.46 square miles (3.8 km^{2}). A reservoir known as Spring Brook Reservoir Number Four is situated on the creek. The surficial geology near the creek includes Wisconsinan Till, Wisconsinan Ice-Contact Stratified Drift, alluvium, coal dumps, and bedrock consisting of sandstone and shale. On July 3, 2011, Coal Creek flooded when 5 inches (13 cm) of rain fell in the watershed in less than 90 minutes. The flood caused $5 million in damage. The creek is designated as a Coldwater Fishery and a Migratory Fishery.

== Course ==
Coal Creek begins in a valley near the northwestern border of Plymouth Township. It flows south-southwest for nearly a mile, passing through Spring Brook Reservoir Number Four. After passing through the reservoir, the creek continues flowing south-southwest for a short distance before turning south-southeast. After several tenths of a mile, its valley becomes significantly shallower and it turns southeast, entering Plymouth. A few tenths of a mile further downstream, the creek turns south-southeast. After several tenths of a mile, it crosses US Route 11 and, about 3,000 feet from its mouth, exits Plymouth, reentering Plymouth Township. A short distance further downstream, it reaches its confluence with the Susquehanna River.

Coal Creek joins the Susquehanna River 184.96 miles (297.66 km) upriver of its mouth.

== Hydrology ==
In 1916, Coal Creek was described as having clear waters as far downstream as the Lehigh and Wilkes-Barre Coal Company's mine openings, near an outcrop. However, downstream of that point, large amounts of mine water were pumped into the creek. Nowadays the creek is often dry, but can experience short, high-rate floods on occasion.

== Geography and geology ==
The elevation near the mouth of Coal Creek is 515 feet (157 m) above sea level. The elevation near the creek's source is between 1,400 and 1,420 feet (430 and 430 m) above sea level. As it descends over 800 feet (240 m) in less than three miles between its source and its mouth, the creek is a "rapid stream".

Since the Coal Creek Flood in 2011, 1,500 feet (460 m) of Coal Creek in residential areas have been protected with riprap and concrete walls. The creek is in the Wyoming Valley. Its headwaters are in mountains in Plymouth Township.

Reynolds Shaft is not far from the mouth of Coal Creek. The Baltimore Coal Company historically had a mine on the creek. A 100-year-old water main runs through the creek. The water main is made of cast iron and supplies water to a third of the Wyoming Valley.

For a significant portion of its length, the surficial geology of the watershed of Coal Creek features a glacial or resedimented till known as Wisconsinan Till, as well as bedrock consisting of sandstone and shale. Near the creek's lower reaches, alluvium, coal dumps, Wisconsinan Ice-Contact Stratified Drift, and land where coal was once surface mined.

== Watershed ==
The watershed of Coal Creek has an area of 1.46 square miles (3.8 km^{2}). The creek's mouth is in the United States Geological Survey quadrangle of Wilkes-Barre West. However, its source is in the quadrangle of Kingston.

The watershed of Coal Creek is extremely narrow in its lower reaches. It is considerably broader in its middle and upper reaches, but is still much longer than it is wide.

A reservoir known as the Spring Brook Reservoir Number Four is situated on Coal Creek approximately 1 mile (1.6 km) downstream of its source. This reservoir is at an elevation of 1,280 feet (390 m) above sea level. It is dammed and has a capacity of 6,000,000 gallons. In the early 1900s, another reservoir was present on the creek 0.5 miles (0.80 km) further downstream, at an elevation of 1,100 feet (340 m) above sea level. This reservoir held only 3,000,000 gallons and is known as Reservoir Number Three. Further downstream was Reservoir Number Two, which was at an elevation of 940 feet (290 m) above sea level and held 1,500,000 gallons.

Much of the flow of Coal Creek is diverted around a levee at one point. Some of the creek's flow also goes through storm sewers.

== History ==
Coal Creek has been known by other names during its history, including: Coleman's Creek, Mill Creek, Smith's Creek and Ransom Creek.

Coal beds lay below Plymouth's surface at various depths, beds that were visible in the form of outcrops along Coal Creek, about a mile upstream from the Susquehanna River. Attracted by this outcrop, Abijah Smith came to Plymouth about 1806, and with his business partner Lewis Hepburn, bought a 75-acre plot (called Lots 45 and 46) on the east side of the creek, intending to mine, ship and sell coal. According to Plymouth historian Hendrick B. Wright, in the fall of 1807, Abijah Smith purchased an ark from John P. Arndt, a Wilkes-Barre merchant, which Arndt had used for the transportation of plaster. Smith floated the ark from Wilkes-Barre to Plymouth, loaded it with about fifty tons of anthracite coal, and shipped it to Columbia, in Lancaster County. By 1835, the mine belonged to John Ingham (married in 1827 to Abijah Smith's widow), who lost it that year in a Sheriff's sale. By 1873, the mine was owned by Hendrick B. Wright, and leased to Broderick, Conyngham & Co., operators of the Nottingham Colliery.

In 1805, Hezekiah Roberts, Sr. obtained a patent for 121 acres (0.49 km^{2}) of land, called Lot 44, on the west side of Coal Creek, which he sold to William Currie, who in 1810, sold to Lewis Hepburn (Abijah's Smith's partner). In 1811, Hepburn sold half the rights to John Smith (Abijah Smith's brother). In 1816, after Lewis Hepburn died, Hepburn's son Patrick sold Smith the second half of the coal rights. John Smith operated his mine on the west side of Coal Creek from 1811 until about 1837. In 1840, Smith leased his coal beds to his son, Francis J. Smith, his stepson, Samuel French, and his sons-in-law, Draper Smith and William C. Reynolds. In 1848, Smith sold the coal rights to Lot 44 outright to Reynolds.

Coal Creek was entered into the Geographic Names Information System on August 2, 1979. Its identifier in the Geographic Names Information System is 1172052. On July 3, 2011, a localized flooding event known as the Coal Creek Flood occurred. During the event, 5 inches (13 cm) or more of rain fell in 90 minutes in the watershed, causing "indescribable damage". After the flood, the municipalities of Plymouth and Plymouth Township began clearing the resulting debris and opening temporary access roads. However, the area did not qualify for federal aid, as the damage was highly localized. The flood is considered to be a 1000 year flood. However, the nearby Wadham Creek (less than a mile from Coal Creek) did not even overflow its banks.

In 2011, several Emergency Watershed Program projects were planned for the watershed of Coal Creek. Flooding on the creek in 2011 destroyed the nearby Coal Street and exposed a 100-year-old 36-inch water main. The damage cost by the Coal Creek Flood in 2011 was upwards of $5,000,000. The total cost of repairing Coal Creek was $1,342,732.

== Biology ==
Coal Creek is designated as a Coldwater Fishery and a Migratory Fishery.

== See also ==
- Harveys Creek, next tributary on the west side of the Susquehanna River going downriver
- Wadham Creek, next tributary on the west side of the Susquehanna River going upriver
- List of rivers of Pennsylvania
