= Wadham Creek =

Wadham Creek Wadhams Creek
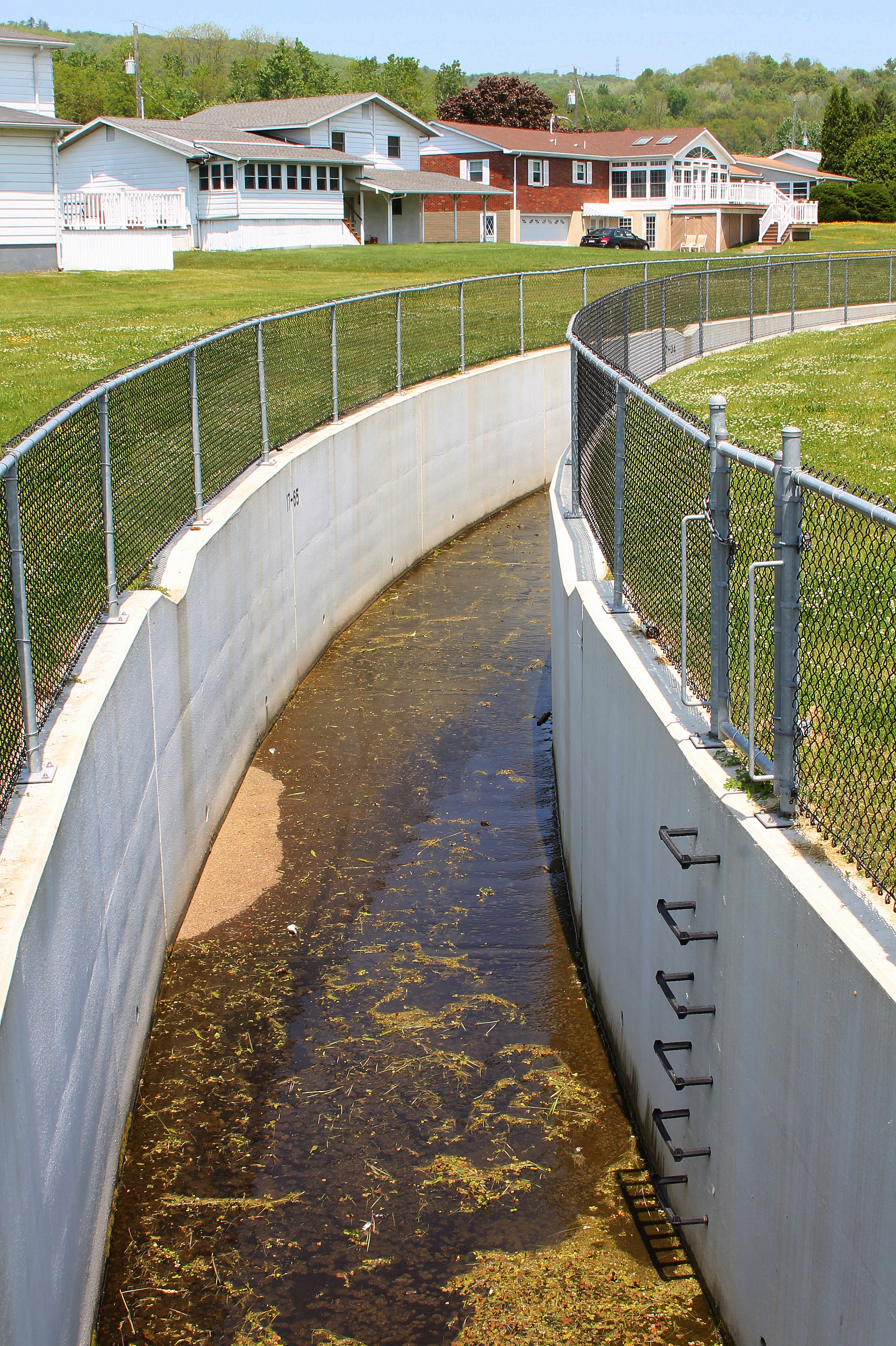
- Wadham Creek looking upstream

Physical characteristics
- Source
  - location: Base of a mountain in Plymouth Township, Luzerne County, Pennsylvania
  - elevation: Between 740 and 760 feet (230 and 230 m)
- Mouth
  - location: Susquehanna River in Plymouth, Luzerne County, Pennsylvania
  - coordinates: 41°14′09″N 75°57′07″W
  - elevation: 515 ft (157 m)
- Length: 1.1 mi (1.8 km)
- Basin size: 1.28 sq mi (3.3 km^{2})
- Discharge
  - average: Often dry

Basin features
- Progression: Susquehanna River → Chesapeake Bay

Wadham Creek, usually styled Wadhams Creek, and in the 18th century first known by European settlers as Whittlesey Creek, is a tributary of the Susquehanna River in Luzerne County, Pennsylvania, in the United States. It is approximately 1.1 miles (1.8 km) long and flows through Plymouth Township and Plymouth Borough. The creek's watershed has an area of 1.28 square miles (3.3 km^{2}). It has one dam. The drainage basin of Wadham Creek is designated as a Coldwater Fishery and a Migratory Fishery.

== Course ==
Wadham Creek begins on the base of the Shawnee Mountain range in Plymouth Township. The elevation of the creek's source is between 740 and 760 feet (230 and 230 m) above sea level. It flows south for a short distance before entering the Plymouth Borough. Once in Plymouth, the creek continues to flow south for several tenths of a mile before turning southwest. After several hundred feet, it turns southeast and crosses beneath US Route 11. A short distance further downstream, it reaches its confluence with the Susquehanna River. The elevation near the mouth of Wadham Creek is 515 feet (157 m) above sea level.

Wadham Creek joins the Susquehanna River 185.43 miles (298.42 km) upstream of its mouth.

== Watershed, geography, hydrology, and geology ==
The watershed of Wadham Creek has an area of 1.28 square miles (3.3 km^{2}). The creek's mouth is in the United States Geological Survey's Wilkes-Barre West quadrangle, while its source is in the Kingston quadrangle.

There are a number of diversions and debris structures on Wadham Creek upstream of Plymouth. In Plymouth, the creek flows through both open channels and culverts. Wadham Creek has a dam above where it crosses Shawnee Avenue. The dam is 32 feet (9.8 m) high. Mine subsidence affects the dam, but as of 2009, Luzerne County considered the mitigation of this problem to be low-priority.

Wadham Creek is typically dry. However, it can experience short, high-rate floods on occasion.

The surficial geology in the vicinity of the lower reaches of Wadham Creek consists largely of alluvium, with some fill. The surficial geology near the creek's middle reaches consists mainly of alluvial fan and Wisconsinan Ice-Contact Stratified Drift. The surficial geology in the creek's upper reaches features land where coal was once surface mined, with large pits and piles of rock waste.

== History ==
Until the late 18th century, Wadham Creek was known as Whittlesey Creek. In the 1940s, Wadham Creek was known as Nottingham Creek after the nearby Nottingham Colliery. On August 2, 1979, the creek was entered into the Geographic Names Information System as "Wadham Creek." Its identifier in the Geographic Names Information System is 1190462.

According to Samuel L. French's 1915 history, Reminiscences of Plymouth, Luzerne County, Penna, arks and flat-bottomed boats used to transport coal downriver to market were constructed in a long-vanished natural formation known as the "basin". In the 19th century, a blacksmith shop and a mill operated adjacent to the creek.

In 1959, the creek-bed was reformed in concrete from its source to a new earth-fill dam northeast terminus of First Street. The project, which cost $123,000, was flanked nearly its entire length by strip-mine operations.

In 2000–01, after 30 years of political wrangling Wadham Creek was the subject of a restoration project costing $1.3 million. The restoration included giving the creek a concrete streambed and walls. Had the restoration not been done, the creek could have eventually flooded and caused severe damage like the nearby Coal Creek, according to Clif Madrack, a former borough administrator.

In 2011, Coal Creek, less than a mile away, flooded severely after a rainfall 4 inches (10 cm) in less than 45 minutes, but Wadham Creek was did not overflow its banks or suffer any erosion.

== Biology ==
The entire drainage basin of Wadham Creek is designated as a Coldwater Fishery and a Migratory Fishery.

== See also ==
- Coal Creek, next tributary on the west side of the Susquehanna River going downriver
- Brown Creek, next tributary on the west side of the Susquehanna River going upriver
- List of rivers of Pennsylvania
