= Brown Creek =

Physical characteristics
- Source
  - location: valley on a mountain in the northwestern part of Larksville, Luzerne County, Pennsylvania
  - elevation: between 1,320 and 1,340 feet (400 and 410 m)
- Mouth
  - location: Susquehanna River in Plymouth, Luzerne County, Pennsylvania
  - coordinates: 41°14′19″N 75°56′33″W
  - elevation: 528 ft (161 m)
- Length: 3.1 mi (5.0 km)
- Basin size: 2.79 mi^{2} (7.2 km^{2})
- Discharge
  - average: often dry

Basin features
- Progression: Susquehanna River → Chesapeake Bay

Brown Creek (also known as Brown's Creek) is a tributary of the Susquehanna River in Luzerne County, Pennsylvania, in the United States. It is approximately 3.1 miles (5.0 km) long and flows through Larksville and Plymouth. The watershed of the creek has an area of 2.79 square miles (7.2 km^{2}). It is designated as a Coldwater Fishery and a Migratory Fishery. The creek has two dams on it: the Brown Creek Dam and the Brown Creek Debris Dam. It is crossed by a number of bridges, and covered by several buildings.

== Course ==
Brown Creek begins in a valley on a mountain, once known as Pine Swamp, in the northwestern part of Larksville. It flows south-southwest for a few tenths of a mile before turning southeast for several tenths of a mile, passing through the community of Gregory and exiting its valley. The creek then turns south-southeast for a few tenths of a mile before turning southeast and then south-southwest, entering Plymouth after several tenths of a mile. In Plymouth, it turns east for a short distance before turning south, crossing beneath US Route 11 and reaching its confluence with the Susquehanna River.

Brown Creek joins the Susquehanna River 185.92 miles (299.21 km) upriver of its mouth.

== Hydrology, geography and geology ==
The elevation near the mouth of Brown Creek has an area of 528 feet (161 m) above sea level. The elevation near the source of the creek is between 1,320 and 1,340 feet (400 and 410 m) above sea level.

The discharge of Brown Creek was measured three times in 1956. On November 6, 1956, it was measured to be 0.14 cubic feet per second. On June 30, 1956, it was measured to be 0.20 cubic feet per second and on September 21, 1956, it was measured to be 0.37 cubic feet per second. Brown Creek is typically dry. However, it can experience short, intense floods on occasion. Near the debris dam on the creek, most of its flow is diverted through a 10-foot (3-meter) wide pressure conduit that carries water through a nearby levee. The remaining flow continues through the channel of Brown Creek in both open channels and culverts, running under roads and buildings.

== Watershed ==
The watershed of Brown Creek has an area of 2.79 square miles (7.2 km^{2}). The section of the creek's watershed that is upstream of the community of Gregory has an area of 0.70 square miles (1.8 km^{2}). The creek's mouth is in the United States Geological Survey quadrangle of Wilkes-Barre West. However, its source is in the quadrangle of Kingston.

Brown Creek is dammed by a dam known as the Brown Creek Dam, which is located on Cherry Street in the borough of Plymouth. Its reservoir is dry in typical conditions. As of 1980, the dam was in "fair" condition, although it is experiencing some erosion. It is classified as a "high hazard-small dam". Mine subsidence affects the dam, but a plan to fix this is considered to be low-priority. A pumping station also operates on the creek. There is also a debris dam on the creek near Edwards Street.

== History ==
Brown Creek, usually called Brown's Creek, has been known by many other names historically, including: Nesbitt's Creek, Cooper's Run, Poke Hollow Creek, Bull Run Creek and Pine Swamp Creek.

A concrete culvert bridge carrying Carver Street was constructed over Brown Creek in 1951. It is 29.9 feet (9.1 m) long and is situated in Plymouth. Another concrete culvert bridge, this one carrying State Route 1001, was built over the creek in 1953. It is 40.0 feet (12.2 m). It underwent replacement in 2014 for a cost of $443,000.

An earth-fill dam and a debris dam were constructed on Brown Creek in 1959 for a cost of $492,000. A pressure conduit on Brown Creek failed during Tropical Storm Lee.

Brown Creek was entered into the Geographic Names Information System on August 2, 1979. Its identifier in the Geographic Names Information System is 1170364.

== Biology ==
The entire drainage basin of Brown Creek is designated as a Coldwater Fishery and a Migratory Fishery.

== See also ==
- Wadham Creek, next tributary on the west side of the Susquehanna River going downriver
- Shupp's Creek, next tributary on the west side of the Susquehanna River, going upriver.
- Toby Creek, next tributary (after Shupp's Creek) on the west side of the Susquehanna River going upriver.
- List of rivers of Pennsylvania
