= Pikes Creek =

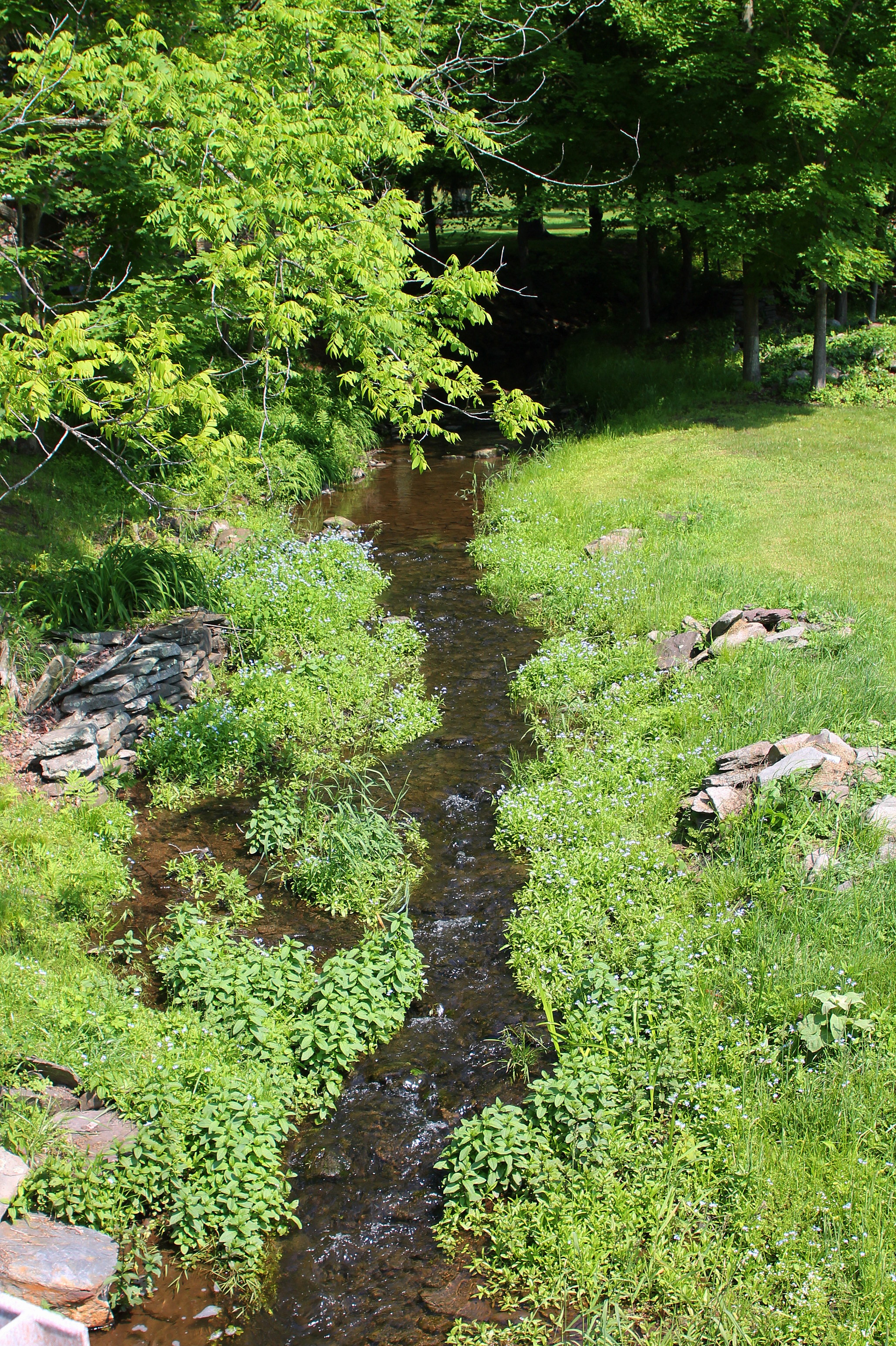
- Pikes Creek looking upstream

Physical characteristics
- Source
  - location: pond or small lake in Lake Township, Luzerne County, Pennsylvania
  - elevation: 1,480 ft (450 m)
- Mouth
  - location: Harveys Creek on the border between Jackson Township, Luzerne County, Pennsylvania and Plymouth Township, Luzerne County, Pennsylvania
  - coordinates: 41°15′46″N 76°02′01″W
  - elevation: between 940 and 960 feet (290 and 290 m)
- Length: 8.9 mi (14.3 km)
- Basin size: 11.6 mi^{2} (30 km^{2})
- Discharge
  - average: 556 cu ft/s (15.7 m^{3}/s) peak annual discharge upstream of Fades Creek (10% probability)

Basin features
- Progression: Harveys Creek → Susquehanna River → Chesapeake Bay
- Tributaries
  - right: Fades Creek

Pikes Creek (also known as Pike Creek) is a tributary of Harveys Creek in Luzerne County, Pennsylvania, in the United States. It is approximately 8.9 miles (14.3 km) long and flows through Lake Township, Lehman Township, Jackson Township, and Plymouth Township. The watershed of the creek has an area of 11.6 square miles (30 km^{2}). It is designated as a High-Quality Coldwater Fishery and a Migratory Fishery, as well as being Class A Wild Trout Waters for part of its length. The creek has a 400-acre reservoir, which is known as the Pikes Creek Reservoir and supplies water to tens of thousands of people. A number of bridges have been constructed over the creek.

== Course ==
Pikes Creek begins in a pond or small lake in Lake Township. It flows southwest for several tenths of a mile before turning south-southeast, east, and then south. The creek then turns southeast for several tenths of a mile before turning south for more than a mile, flowing alongside Pennsylvania Route 29 and through the community of Pikes Creek and crossing Pennsylvania Route 118. At the southern end of the community, the creek receives Fades Creek, its only named tributary, from the right. Pikes Creek then turns west-southwest for a short distance before turning south, exiting Pikes Creek and Lake Township and entering Lehman Township. After some distance, the creek turns east-southeast, flowing away from Pennsylvania Route 29, and enters the Pikes Creek Reservoir after more than a mile. At the southwestern edge of the reservoir, the creek turns southeast for several hundred feet before turning east along the border between Jackson Township and Plymouth Township. After several tenths of a mile, it reaches its confluence with Harveys Creek.

Pikes Creek joins Harveys Creek 5.60 miles (9.01 km) upstream of its mouth.

== Hydrology ==
At the border between Lake Township and Lehman Township, the peak annual discharge of Pikes Creek has a 10 percent chance of reaching 845 cubic feet per second. It has a 2 percent chance of reaching 1508 cubic feet per second and a 1 percent chance of reaching 1868 cubic feet per second. The peak annual discharge has a 0.2 percent chance of reaching 2927 cubic feet per second.

Upstream of the tributary Fades Creek, the peak annual discharge of Pikes Creek has a 10 percent chance of reaching 556 cubic feet per second. It has a 2 percent chance of reaching 1008 cubic feet per second and a 1 percent chance of reaching 1225 cubic feet per second. The peak annual discharge has a 0.2 percent chance of reaching 1986 cubic feet per second.

== Geography and geology ==
The elevation near the mouth of Pikes Creek is between 940 and 960 feet (290 and 290 m) above sea level. The elevation of the creek's source is approximately 1,480 feet (450 m) above sea level.

Pikes Creek flows through a manmade concrete flume for part of its length.

A layer of alluvium with a thickness of 10 feet (3.0 m) occurs in the valley of Pikes Creek. It contains stratified sand, silt, and gravel. Wisconsinan Outwash, which consists of stratified sand and gravel, also occurs in the creek's valley. There are large piles of drift in the creek's valley and Wisconsinan Ice-Contact Stratified Drift occurs with a thickness of more than 30 feet (9.1 m) at the community of Pikes Creek. This drift also occurs near the creek's headwaters. Glacial or resedimented tills such as Wisconsinan Bouldery Till and Wisconsinan Till also occur in the creek's vicinity, as does a rock quarry pit. Bedrock consisting of sandstone and shale occur in the area as well.

== Watershed ==
The watershed of Pikes Creek has an area of 11.60 square miles (30.0 km^{2}). At least part of the creek is in the United States Geological Survey quadrangle of Harveys Lake. The portion of the watershed that is upstream of Fades Creek has an area of 2.93 square miles (7.6 km^{2}).

The watershed of Pikes Creek, along with that of Harveys Creek, is used as a water supply by Pennsylvania American Water Company Ceasetown. The creeks supply part or all of 15 communities: Ashley, Courtdale, Edwardsville, Mocanaqua, Larksville, Plymouth, Pringle, Shickshinny, West Nanticoke, Nanticoke, Wilkes-Barre, Hanover Township, Hunlock Township, Plymouth Township, Newport Township, and Wilkes-Barre Township. The water company serves 67,500 people and is allowed to withdraw 16 million gallons per day from the watersheds.

A dammed 400-acre lake known as Pikes Creek Reservoir is situated on Pikes Creek. The lake is mainly used for water supply. The lake is private property. The dam, which is known as the Pikes Creek Dam, is 65 feet (20 m) high.

Pikes Creek is entirely on private land. However, 50 percent of this land is accessible to the public.

Pikes Creek, along with Beaver Run, Fades Creek, and Harveys Creek, is one of the main sources of flooding in Lake Township. However, these creeks' floods have not caused extensive damage, since Lake Township is relatively undeveloped.

== History and recreation ==
Pikes Creek was entered into the Geographic Names Information System on August 2, 1979. Its identifier in the Geographic Names Information System is 1183731. The creek is also known as Pike Creek. This name appears on certain topographic maps of the United States Geological Survey.

Daniel Lee settled near the headwaters of Pike Creek in 1806. In 1860, Otis Allen constructed a mill on the creek in Lake Township.

A steel stringer bridge carrying T-676/East Salt Road was constructed over Pikes Creek in 1926. It is 26.9 feet (8.2 m) long and is situated near Pennsylvania Route 29. A concrete slab bridge carrying Pennsylvania Route 29 was built over the creek in 1927 and repaired in 1980. It is 39.0 feet (11.9 m) long and is situated in Lehman Township. A concrete tee beam bridge was constructed over the creek in 1932 in Lake Township. It is 24.0 feet (7.3 m) long and carries Pennsylvania Route 29. Another concrete slab bridge was built over the creek in 1935 in Lake Township. It carries Pennsylvania Route 118 and is 21.0 feet (6.4 m) long.

Pikes Creek flows alongside the northern side of Moon Lake County Park for a portion of its length. Shoreline fishing is permitted along some areas of the Pikes Creek Reservoir, though boating, ice fishing, swimming, and wading are not allowed.

== Biology ==
The drainage basin of Pikes Creek is designated as a High-Quality Coldwater Fishery and a Migratory Fishery. The creek is considered by the Pennsylvania Fish and Boat Commission to be Class A Wild Trout Waters for brook trout and brown trout from its headwaters downstream to the uppermost arm of the Pikes Creek Reservoir. Fifteen species of fish, including largemouth bass, yellow perch, bluegills, and black crappies are found in the reservoir.

An old-growth forest is in the vicinity of Pikes Creek downstream of the Pikes Creek Reservoir.

== See also ==
- East Fork Harveys Creek, next tributary of Harveys Creek going downstream
- Paint Spring Run, next tributary of Harveys Creek going downstream
