= Fades Creek =

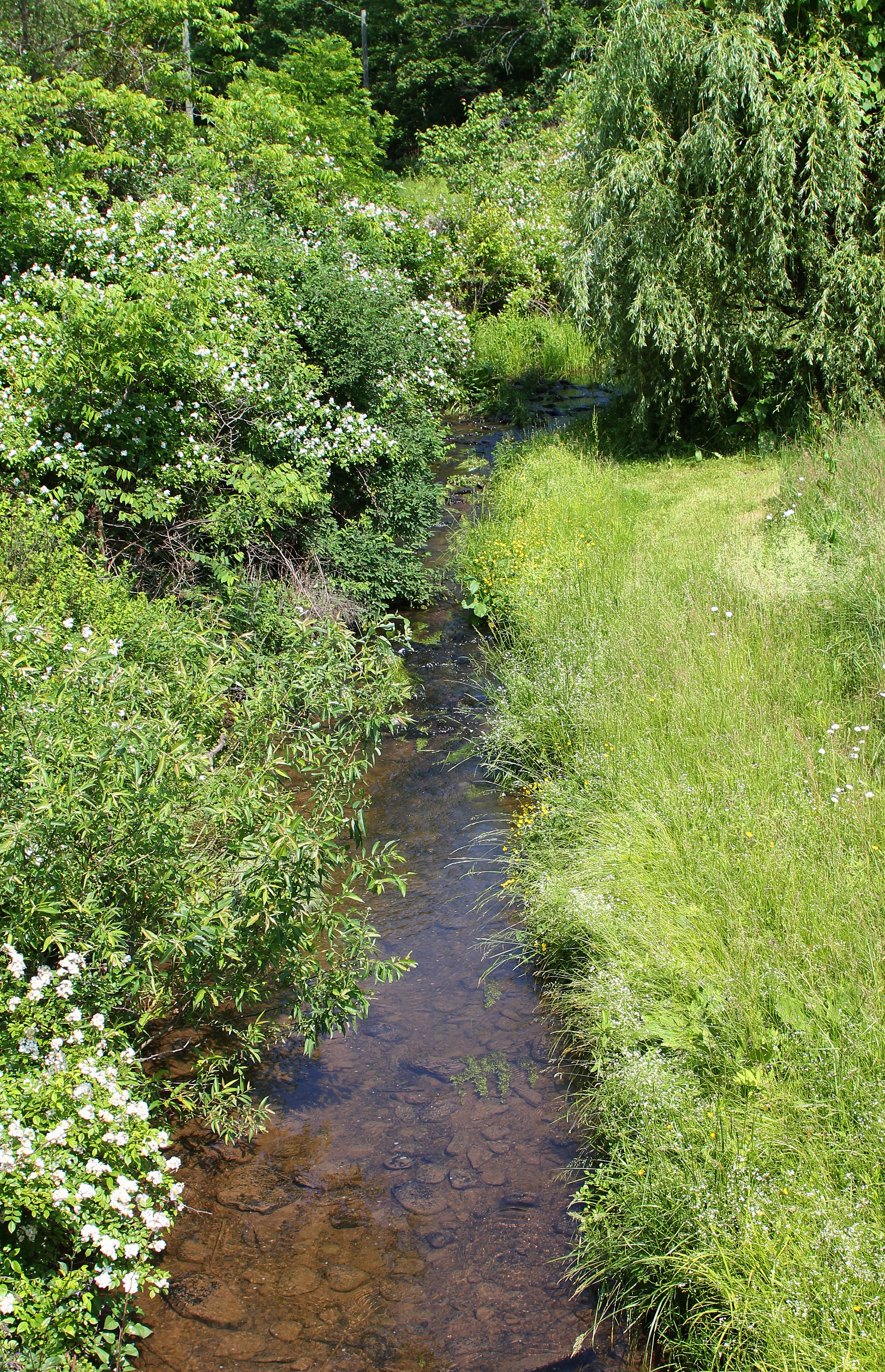
- Fades Creek looking upstream from Pennsylvania Route 118

Physical characteristics
- Source
  - location: valley at the base of a hill in Lake Township, Luzerne County, Pennsylvania
  - elevation: between 1,340 and 1,360 feet (410 and 410 m)
- Mouth
  - location: Pikes Creek in Lake Township, Luzerne County, Pennsylvania
  - coordinates: 41°18′09″N 76°05′37″W
  - elevation: between 1,120 and 1,140 feet (340 and 350 m)
- Length: 3.2 mi (5.1 km)
- Basin size: 2.07 mi^{2} (5.4 km^{2})
- Discharge
  - average: 424 cu ft/s (12.0 m^{3}/s) peak annual discharge at mouth (10% probability)

Basin features
- Progression: Pikes Creek → Harveys Creek → Susquehanna River → Chesapeake Bay
- Tributaries
  - right: one unnamed tributary

Fades Creek is a tributary of Pikes Creek in Luzerne County, Pennsylvania, in the United States. It is approximately 3.2 miles (5.1 km) long and flows through Lake Township. The watershed of the creek has an area of 2.07 square miles (5.4 km^{2}). It has one unnamed tributary and is designated as a High-Quality Coldwater Fishery and Class A Wild Trout Waters for part of its length. The creek is crossed by a pipeline and a bridge carrying Pennsylvania Route 118. Wisconsinan Ice-Intact Stratified Drift, alluvium, Wisconsinan Till, Wisconsinan Bouldery Till, and bedrock consisting of sandstone and shale all occur in the surficial geology in the creek's vicinity.

== Course ==
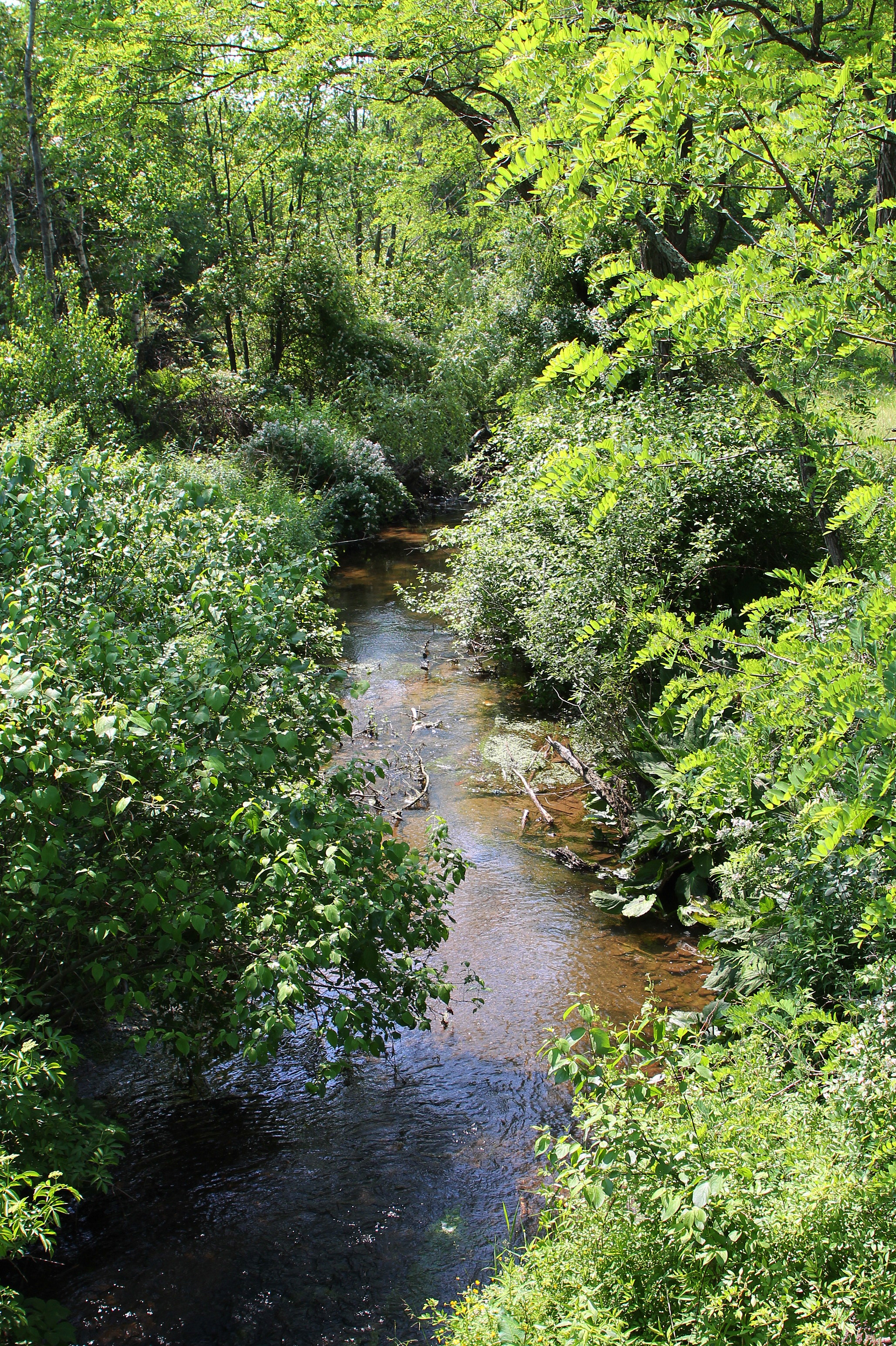
Fades Creek looking downstream from Pennsylvania Route 118

Fades Creek begins in a valley at the base of a hill in Lake Township. It flows south for a few tenths of a mile before turning southwest and then gradually turning southeast, passing through a pond. The creek continues flowing southeast in a narrow valley for more than a mile, receiving an unnamed tributary from the right and entering the community of Pikes Creek. It then turns south-southeast for nearly a mile, crossing Pennsylvania Route 118, before turning east-southeast. The creek then crosses Pennsylvania Route 29 and within several hundred feet reaches its confluence with Pikes Creek.

== Hydrology ==
The concentration of alkalinity in the waters of Fades Creek is 10 milligrams per liter.

At its mouth, the peak annual discharge of Fades Creek has a 10 percent chance of reaching 424 cubic feet per second. It has a 2 percent chance of reaching 775 cubic feet per second and a 1 percent chance of reaching 969 cubic feet per second. The peak annual discharge has a 0.2 percent chance of reaching 1543 cubic feet per second.

Fades Creek has been contaminated by sediment runoff during wet weather. However, in 2009, Lake Township received a $131,044 to alleviate the problem by repairing Wesley Road and Bear Hollow Road. This project involved raising the grade of Wesley Road and constructing Swales to divert stormwater away from the creek.

== Geography and geology ==
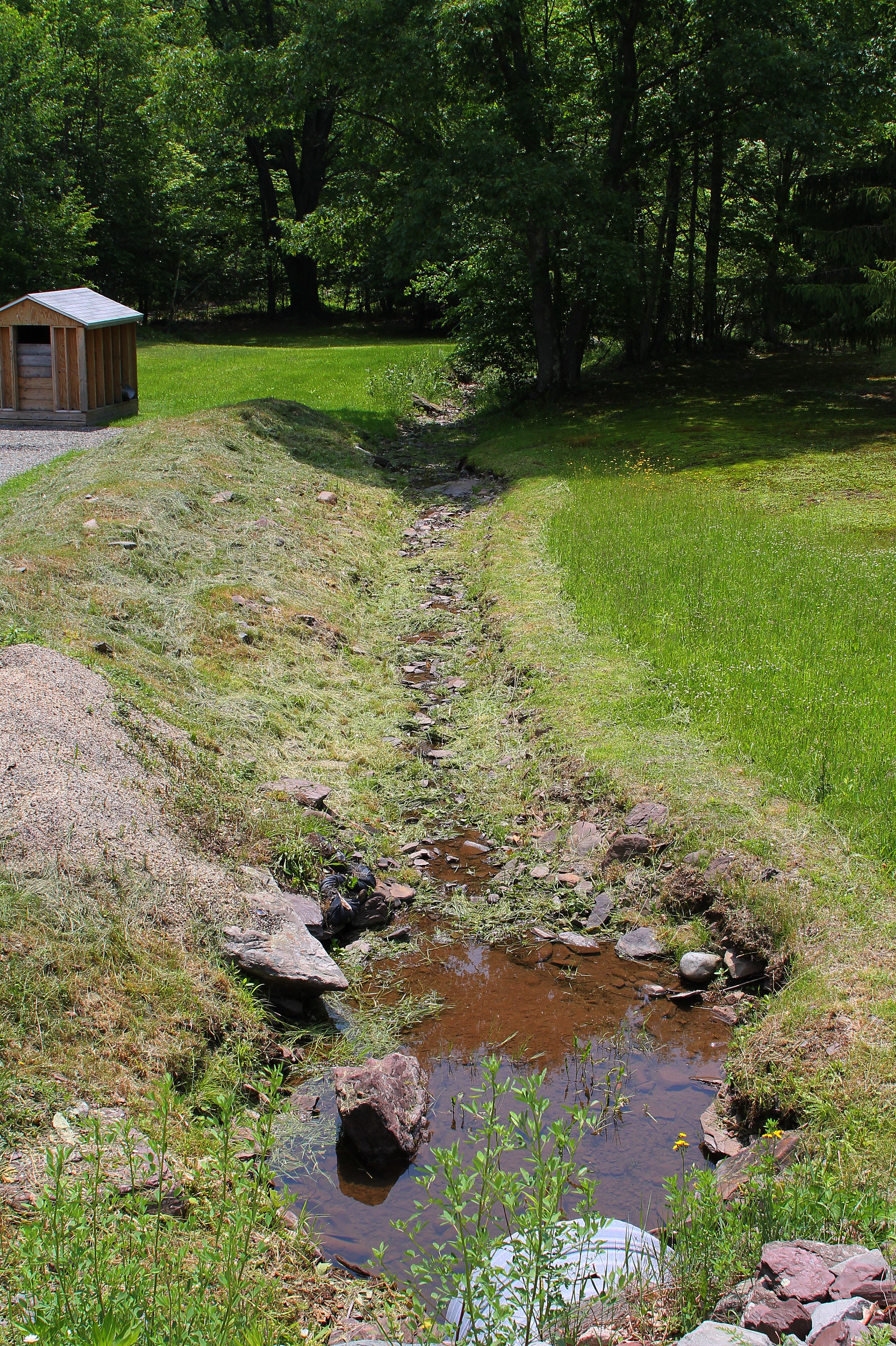
Fades Creek looking downstream in its upper reaches

The elevation near the mouth of Fades Creek is between 1,120 and 1,140 feet (340 and 350 m) above sea level. The elevation near the source is between 1,340 and 1,360 feet (410 and 410 m) above sea level.

Fades Creek is crossed by a pipeline at river mile 1.6. There are three features on the creek that are identified by the Federal Emergency Management Agency as obstructions.

For most of its length, the surficial geology in the vicinity of Fades Creek consists of alluvium, Wisconsinan Ice-Intact Stratified Drift, and resedimented or glacial tills such as Wisconsinan Till and Wisconsinan Bouldery Till. However, bedrock consisting of sandstone and shale also occurs in the surficial geology in the creek's vicinity, as do a few small patches of wetland.

== Watershed ==
The watershed of Fades Creek has an area of 2.07 square miles (5.4 km^{2}). Fades Creek flows through the United States Geological Survey quadrangles of Harveys Lake and Sweet Valley.

The entire length of Fades Creek is in private land.

Fades Creek, along with Beaver Run, Pikes Creek, and Harveys Creek, is one of the main sources of flooding in Lake Township. However, these creeks' floods have not caused extensive damage, since the township is relatively undeveloped.

== History ==
Fades Creek was entered into the Geographic Names Information System on August 2, 1979. Its identifier in the Geographic Names Information System is 1192440.

In the early 1900s, the commissioners of Luzerne County requested permission to construct a bridge over a tributary of Fades Creek. This bridge was on a road between the communities of Pikes Creek and Kettle. A concrete slab bridge carrying Pennsylvania Route 118 over Fades Creek was constructed in 1932 and repaired in 1960. It is 22.0 feet (6.7 m) long and is situated in Lake Township near Pennsylvania Route 29.

== Biology ==
Fades Creek is considered by the Pennsylvania Fish and Boat Commission to be Class A Wild Trout Waters for brook trout from the pipeline crossing downstream to its mouth. However, wild trout naturally reproduce in the creek throughout its entire length. The creek is also designated as a High-Quality Coldwater Fishery.

== See also ==
- List of rivers of Pennsylvania
