= Pikes Creek Reservoir =

- Pike Creek Reservoir, Ceasetown Reservoir
- Location within Pennsylvania Location within the United States
- Coordinates: 41.274°N 76.057°W
- Type: Potable water supply reservoir
- Primary inflows: Pikes Creek
- Primary outflows: Pikes Creek
- Surface area: 397.6 acres (160.9 ha)
- Water volume: 3,000,000,000 US gallons (11,000,000 m^{3})
- Surface elevation: 1,060 feet (320 m)

Pikes Creek Reservoir (also known as Pike Creek Reservoir or Ceasetown Reservoir) is a reservoir in Luzerne County, Pennsylvania, in the United States. It has a surface area of approximately 400 acres (160 ha) and is situated in Lehman Township, Jackson Township, and Plymouth Township. The lake is situated on Pikes Creek. It has a volume of approximately 3 billion gallons and is used as a water supply reservoir. As of 2013, it is inhabited by fifteen fish species. The reservoir is owned by the Pennsylvania-American Water Company, but shoreline fishing is permitted at designated spots.

== Hydrology, geography and geology ==
The elevation of Pikes Creek Reservoir is 1,040 feet (320 m) above sea level. The reservoir is situated on Pikes Creek. It is entirely within the United States Geological Survey quadrangle of Harveys Lake. The lake is located approximately 5 miles (8.0 km) northwest of the city of Wilkes-Barre.

Pikes Creek Reservoir has a surface area of 397.6 acres (160.9 ha). It has a typical volume of approximately three billion gallons.

Pikes Creek Reservoir is in the vicinity of Pennsylvania Route 29.

A Pennsylvania American Water representative has described Pikes Creek Reservoir as "a very good source, very good quality". Water quality tests are done on the reservoir's water on a daily basis by the company.

== History ==
Pikes Creek Reservoir was entered into the Geographic Names Information System on August 2, 1979. Its identifier in the Geographic Names Information System is 1183732. The reservoir is also known as Pike Creek Reservoir or Ceasetown Reservoir.

Pikes Creek Reservoir existed by the 1930s. In around 1932, 80 percent of the reservoir's water supply became exhausted, causing water restrictions to be put in place in Wilkes-Barre. The reservoir was opened to fishing with some limitations in 1998.

As of 2013, the Pennsylvania-American Water Company owns Pikes Creek Reservoir. In the spring of 2013, Pennsylvania Fish and Boat Commission biologists did a fish survey of the reservoir. The main purpose of the reservoir is as a supply of potable water. The Pennsylvania-American Water Company has a facility on the reservoir capable of processing 16 million gallons of water per day, but it normally processes around 9 million gallons.

As of 2010, Pikes Creek Reservoir serves a total of 70,000 customers in 14 municipalities, from Shickshinny to Wilkes-Barre. The nearby Harveys Creek is used as an emergency backup water source during droughts, although, as of 2010, it has not been needed since around 2000.

== Biology ==
In 2013, a total of fifteen fish species were observed in Pikes Creek Reservoir. Largemouth bass was the most common predatory fish, with 105 individuals 2 to 19 inches (5.1 to 48.3 cm) long being caught. The most common fish species overall was bluegill; 106 bluegills were caught, with sizes ranging from 2 to 10 inches (5.1 to 25.4 cm). In addition to bluegills, the main panfish species in the reservoir were black crappies and yellow perch. A total of 56 black crappies measuring 8 to 15 inches (20 to 38 cm) in length were caught, as were 43 yellow perch measuring 10 to 15 inches (25 to 38 cm) in length. Walleyes were also common; 55 walleyes between 10 and 30 inches (25 and 76 cm) in length were caught. Other fish species included white sucker (34 individuals caught), chain pickerel (32 individuals caught), brown bullhead (25 individuals caught), and yellow bullhead (20 individuals caught). Other species were less common in the reservoir, including smallmouth bass (ten individuals caught), channel catfish (three individuals caught), golden shiner (two individuals caught), green sunfish (one individual caught), and bluespotted sunfish (one individual caught).

The second-heaviest reported yellow perch caught in 2009 was caught in Pikes Creek Reservoir; it was 15.5 inches (39 cm) long and weighed 34 ounces (0.96 kg).

== Recreation ==
The Pennsylvania-American Water Company permits shoreline fishing on Pikes Creek Reservoir in designated areas. However, ice fishing, boating, wading, and swimming are forbidden in the reservoir.

== See also ==
- Harveys Lake (Pennsylvania)
- List of lakes in Pennsylvania
