= Plymouth Township, Pennsylvania =

Plymouth Township is the name of two places in the U.S. state of Pennsylvania:

- Plymouth Township, Luzerne County, Pennsylvania
- Plymouth Township, Montgomery County, Pennsylvania
