= Pikes Creek, Pennsylvania =

Unincorporated community in Pennsylvania, US

- Census-designated place
- Location in Pennsylvania Location in the United States
- Coordinates: 41°18′21″N 76°5′46″W
- Country: United States
- State: Pennsylvania
- County: Luzerne
- Township: Lake

Area
  - Total: 1.27 sq mi (3.30 km^{2})
  - Land: 1.27 sq mi (3.30 km^{2})
  - Water: 0 sq mi (0.00 km^{2})

Population (2020)
  - Total: 260
  - Density: 204.2/sq mi (78.83/km^{2})
- Time zone: UTC-5 (Eastern (EST))
  - Summer (DST): UTC-4 (EDT)
- Area code: 570
- FIPS code: 42-60224

Pikes Creek is a census-designated place (CDP) in Lake Township, Luzerne County, Pennsylvania, United States. The population was 269 at the 2010 census.

== Geography ==
Pikes Creek is located at 41°18′21″N 76°5′46″W.

According to the United States Census Bureau, the CDP has a total area of 1.3 square miles (3.3 km^{2}), all land. It is located at the crossroads of Pennsylvania Route 29 and Pennsylvania Route 118. The borough of Dallas is 8 miles (13 km) east along Route 118, and the city of Nanticoke is 12 miles (19 km) south along Route 29.

The village is named for Pikes Creek, a tributary of Harveys Creek, which flows south to the Susquehanna River at West Nanticoke.

== Demographics ==
Historical population
Census	Pop.	Note	%±
2020	260		—
U.S. Decennial Census

== Education ==
The school district is Lake-Lehman School District.
