= Lake-Lehman School District =

School district in Pennsylvania

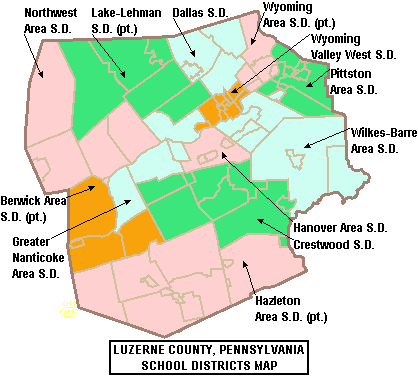
- Location of Lake-Lehman School District in Luzerne County, Pennsylvania

Address
- Market Street, PO Box 38 Lehman, Pennsylvania, 18627; United States

District information
- Type: Public

Other information
- Website: https://www.llsd.org/

The Lake-Lehman School District is a small, American public school district that is partly located in Luzerne County and partly in Wyoming County. It also serves Ross Township, Jackson Township, Harvey’s Lake Borough, and Lake Township as well as Noxen Township in Wyoming County, Pennsylvania.

== History and demographics ==
Lake-Lehman School District encompasses approximately 136 square miles. According to 2000 federal census data, the district serves a resident population of 16,350. In 2009, the per capita income of the district's residents was $21,145 while the median family income was $48,831. According to a New York Times report, in 2006, the student population was 98% Caucasian, 1% black, and 1% Hispanic.

The district operates five schools: Lake-Noxen Elementary, Lehman-Jackson Elementary, Ross Elementary, Lake-Lehman Jr High, and Lake Lehman Sr High.

The school's namesakes are Lake Township and Lehman Township.
