= West Nanticoke, Pennsylvania =

Unincorporated community in Pennsylvania, US

- Census-designated place
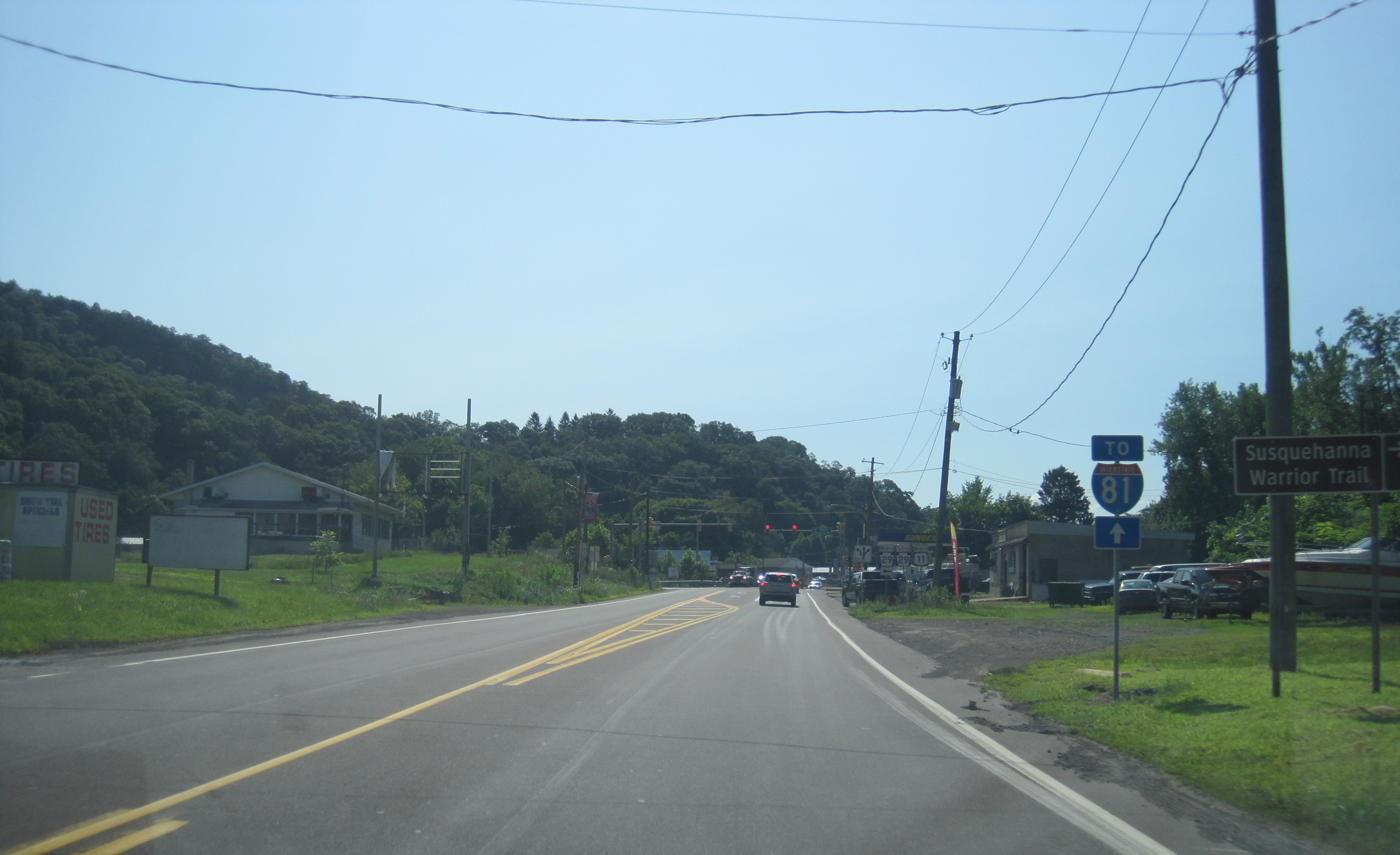
- Along northbound US 11

- Location in Pennsylvania Location in the United States
- Coordinates: 41°13′18″N 76°0′54″W
- Country: United States
- State: Pennsylvania
- County: Luzerne
- Township: Plymouth

Area
  - Total: 0.69 sq mi (1.8 km^{2})
  - Land: 0.58 sq mi (1.5 km^{2})
  - Water: 0.12 sq mi (0.3 km^{2})

Population (2010)
  - Total: 749
  - Density: 1,300/sq mi (500/km^{2})
- Time zone: UTC-5 (Eastern (EST))
  - Summer (DST): UTC-4 (EDT)
- Area code: 570

West Nanticoke is a census-designated place (CDP) in Plymouth Township, Luzerne County, Pennsylvania, United States, across the Susquehanna River from the city of Nanticoke. The population of the CDP was 749 at the 2010 census.

== Geography ==
West Nanticoke is located at 41°13′18″N 76°0′54″W, along U.S. Route 11, on the north bank of the Susquehanna River. It is across the river from the city of Nanticoke, to which it is connected by the Lower Broadway Street Bridge. Pennsylvania Route 29 joins U.S. Route 11 in the center of West Nanticoke. To the north, Route 29 leads to Silkworth and Pikes Creek. Just east of West Nanticoke, Route 29 becomes the South Cross Valley Expressway, crossing the Susquehanna River and leading to Interstate 81 south of Wilkes-Barre. U.S. Route 11 heads northeast to Plymouth and Kingston and southwest to Shickshinny and Berwick.

According to the United States Census Bureau, West Nanticoke has a total area of 0.69 square miles (1.8 km^{2}), of which 0.58 square miles (1.5 km^{2}) is land and 0.12 square miles (0.3 km^{2}), or 17.2%, is water.

== Education ==
The school district is Greater Nanticoke Area School District.

== Gallery ==
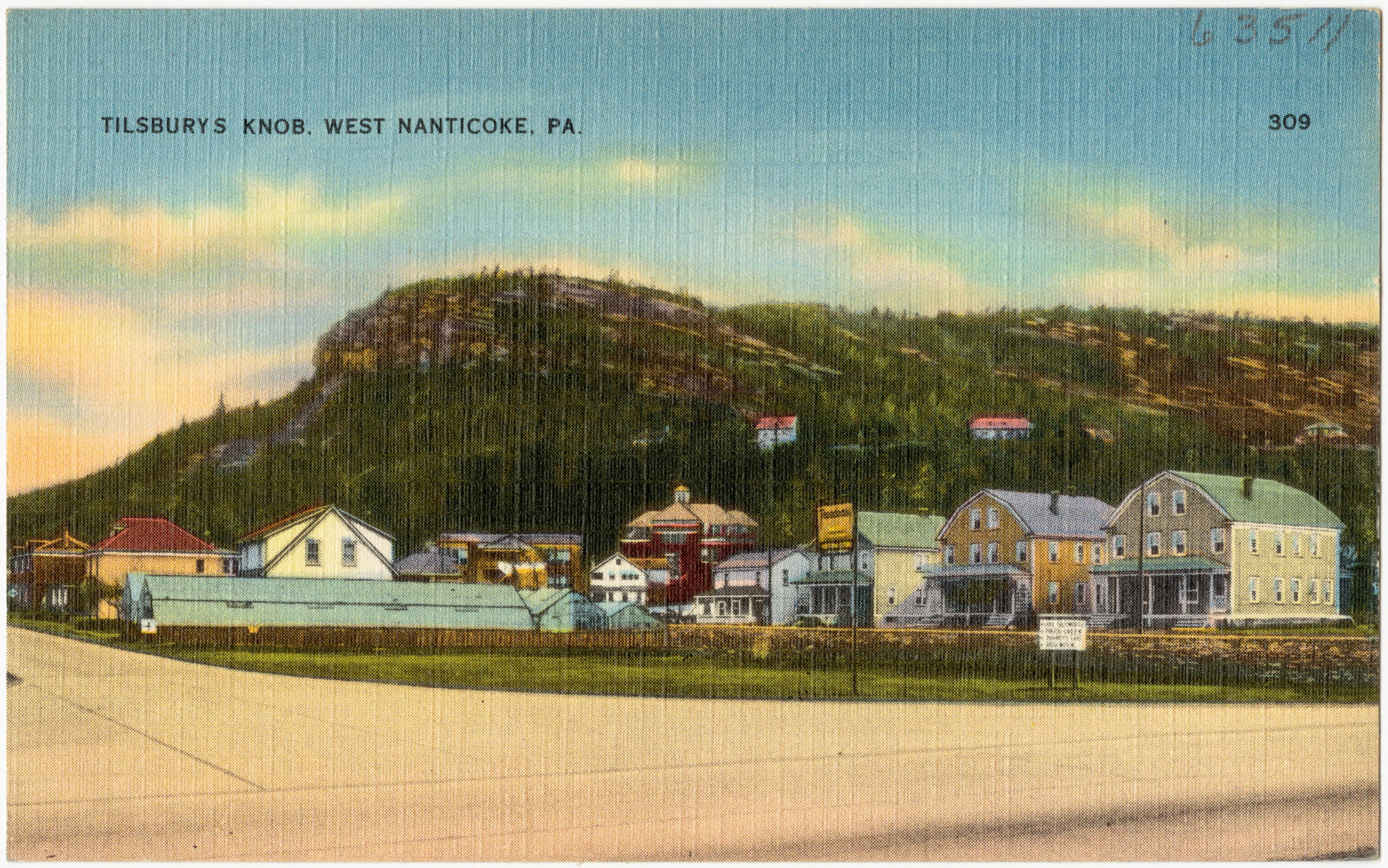
Tilsburys Knob, West Nanticoke

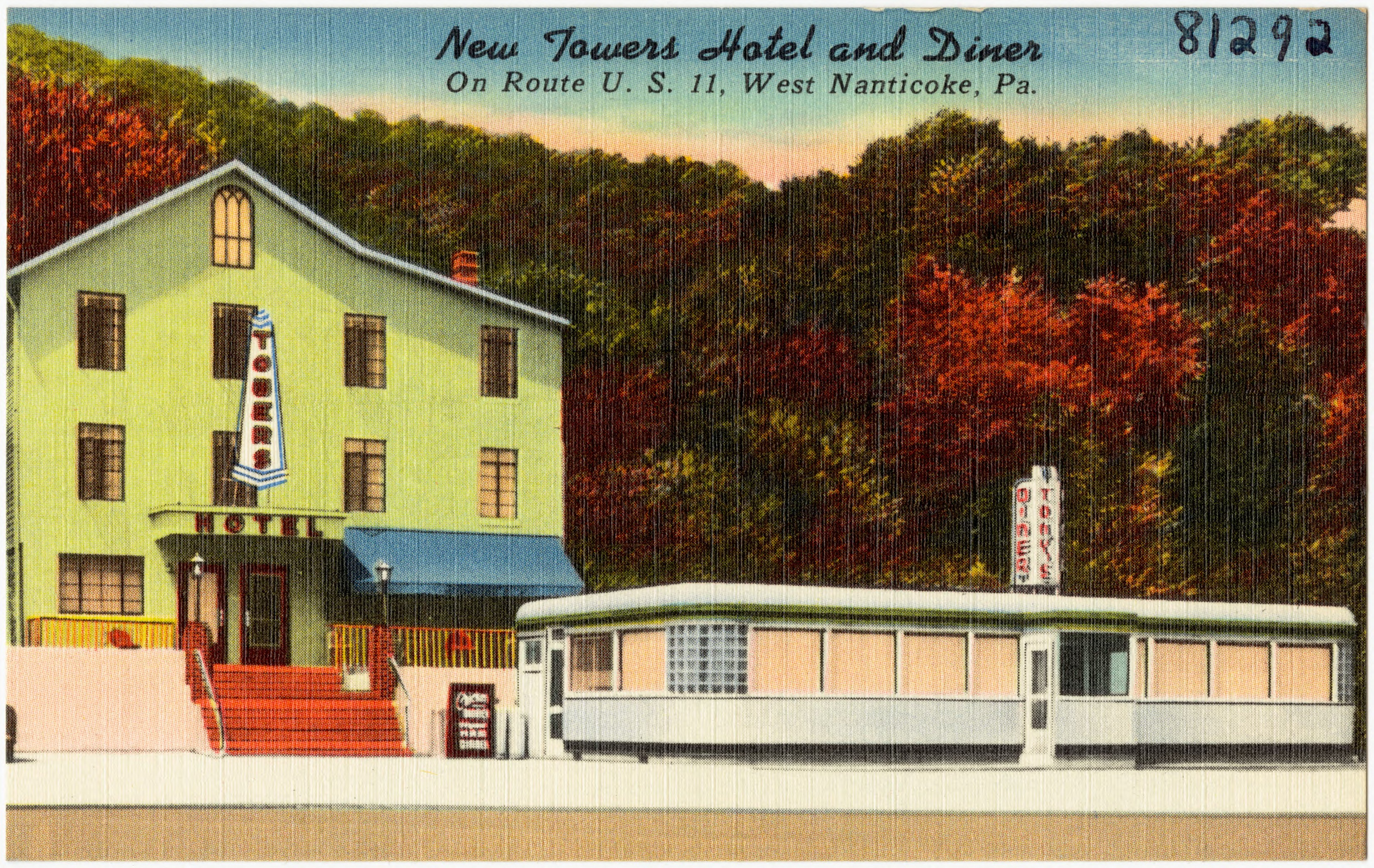
A hotel and diner along U.S. 11 in West Nanticoke

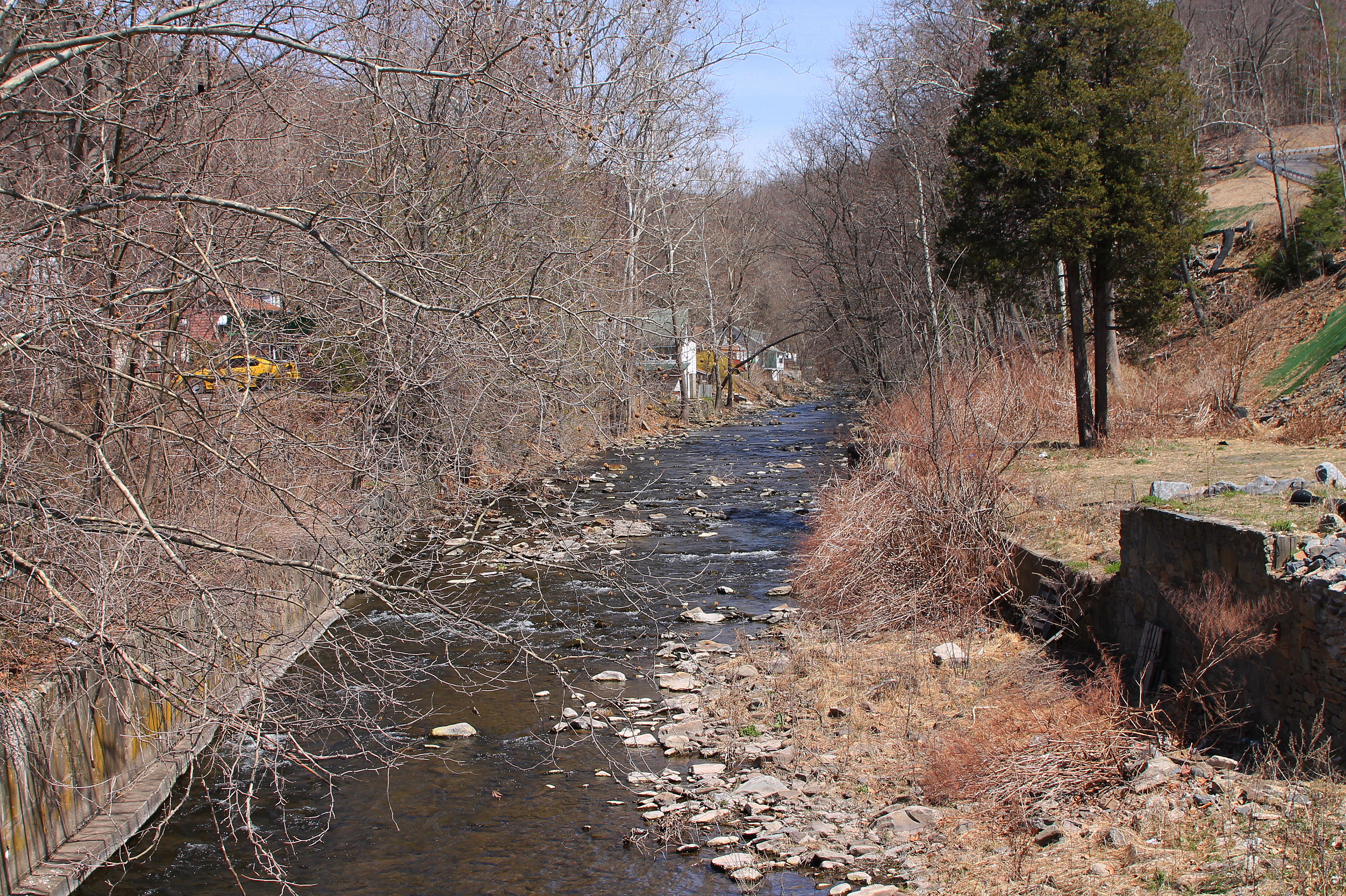
Harveys Creek looking upstream in West Nanticoke

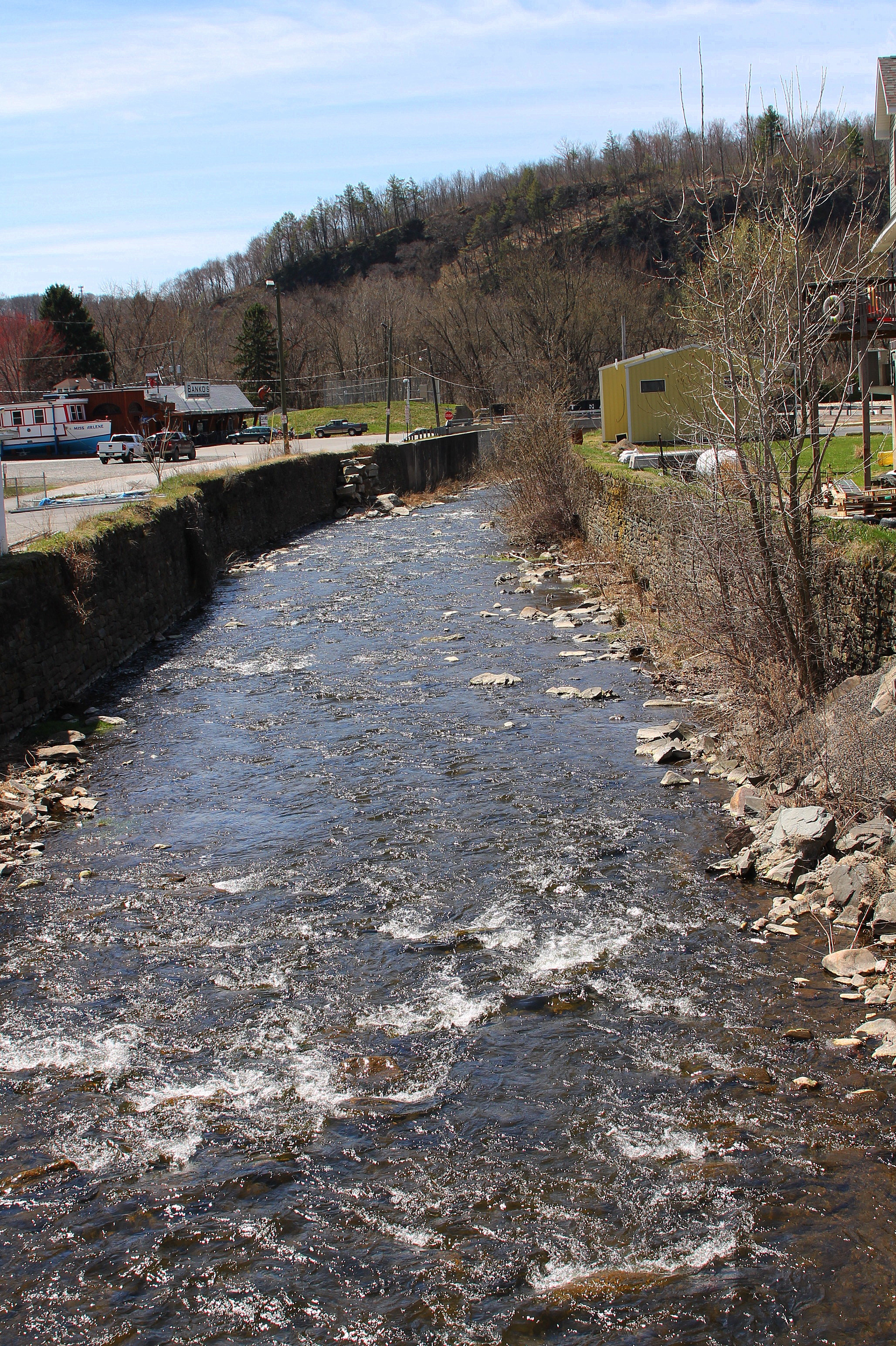
Harveys Creek looking downstream in West Nanticoke
