= Harveys Creek =

Tributary of the Susquehanna River in Luzerne County, Pennsylvania

Harveys Creek Harvey Creek, Harvey's Creek
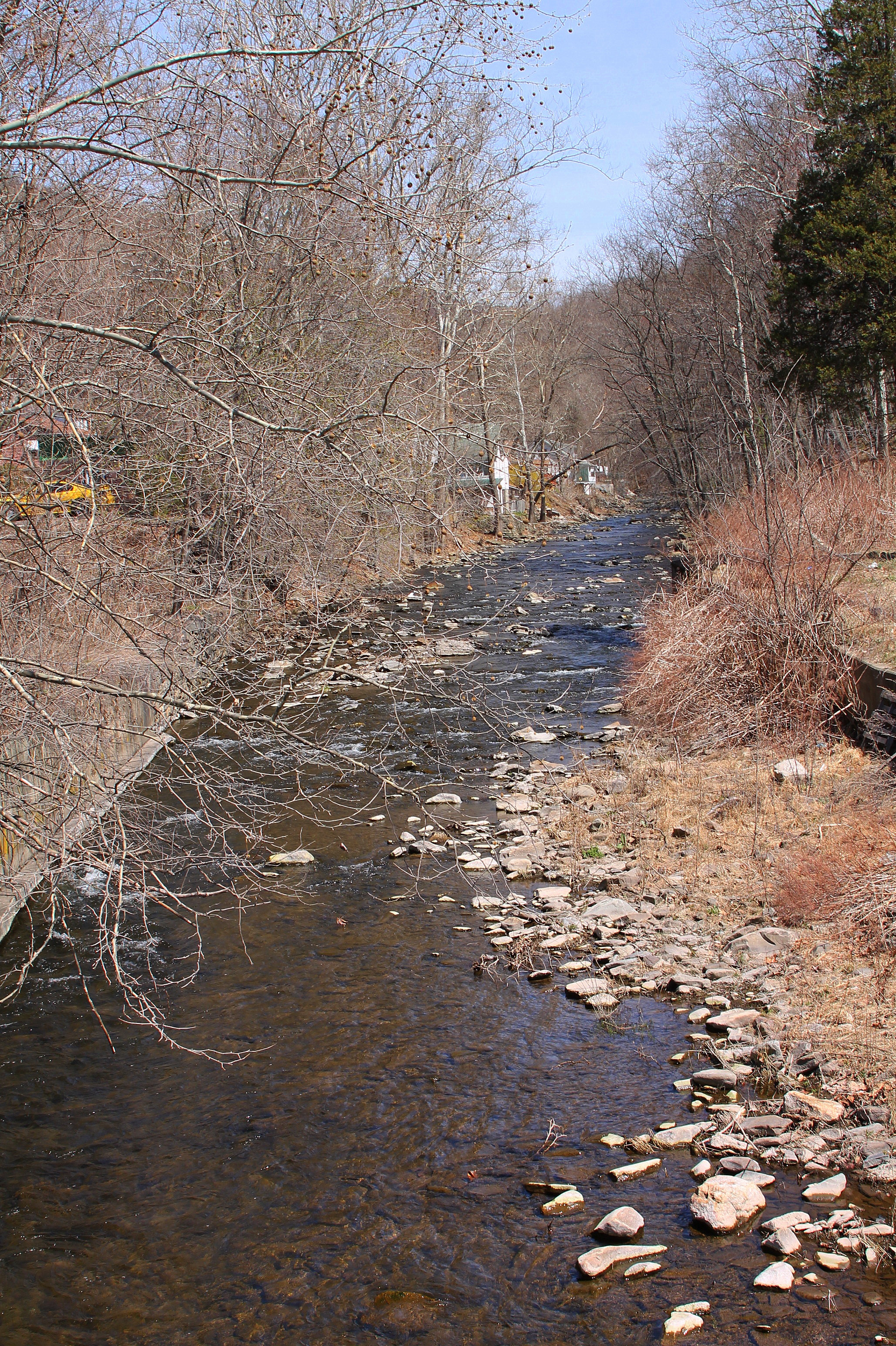
- Harveys Creek looking upstream in West Nanticoke

Physical characteristics
- Source
  - location: Harveys Lake in Harveys Lake, Luzerne County, Pennsylvania
  - elevation: 1,226 ft (374 m)
- Mouth
  - location: Susquehanna River in Plymouth Township, Luzerne County, Pennsylvania
  - coordinates: 41°13′11″N 76°00′59″W
  - elevation: 518 ft (158 m)
- Basin size: 46.3 mi^{2} (120 km^{2})

Basin features
- Progression: Susquehanna River → Chesapeake Bay
- Tributaries
  - left: East Fork Harveys Creek
  - right: Bear Hollow Creek, Paint Spring Run, Pikes Creek

Harveys Creek (also known as Harvey Creek or Harvey's Creek) is a tributary of the Susquehanna River in Luzerne County, Pennsylvania, in the United States. It is approximately 14.5 miles (23.3 km) long and flows through Harveys Lake, Lake Township, Lehman Township, Jackson Township, and Plymouth Township. The creek's watershed has an area of 46.3 square miles (120 km^{2}). The creek has four named tributaries, which are known as Bear Hollow Creek, Paint Spring Run, Pikes Creek, and East Fork Harveys Creek. The watershed is designated as a High-Quality Coldwater Fishery and a Migratory Fishery above Pikes Creek and as a Coldwater Fishery and a Migratory Fishery below it. The creek's source is Harveys Lake, the largest natural lake in Pennsylvania.

Harveys Creek was used as a water supply as early as the beginning of the 1900s. A number of bridges have been constructed over the creek since the 1920s, and it has been dammed by the Bryant Pond Dam. It is possible to canoe on part of the creek. Rock formations consisting of sandstone and shale occur in the watershed.

== Course ==
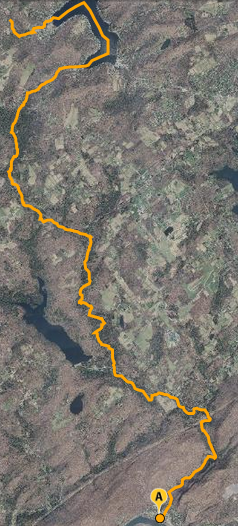
Satellite map of Harveys Creek

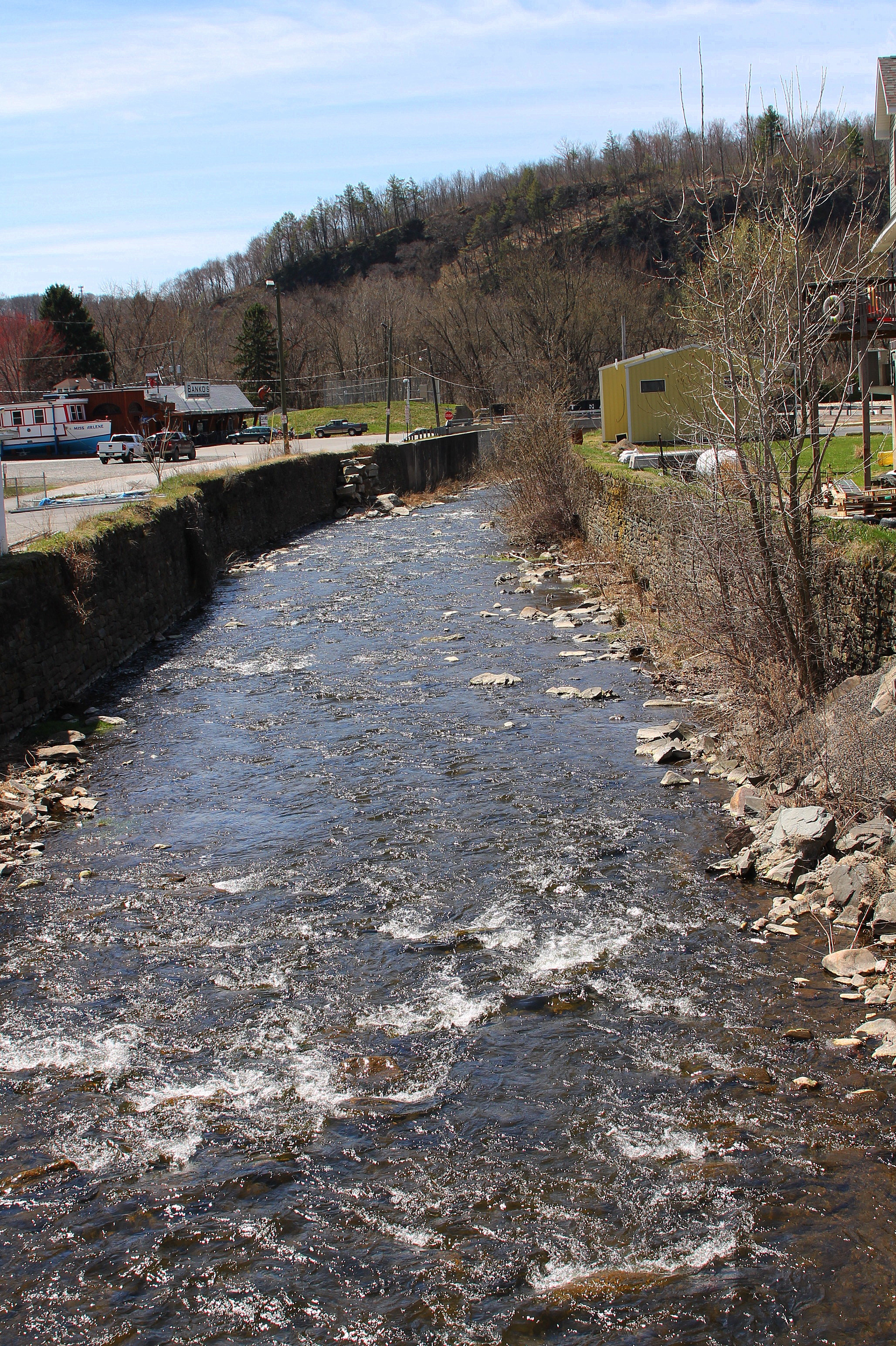
Harveys Creek looking downstream in West Nanticoke

Harveys Creek begins in Harveys Lake in the community of Harveys Lake. The creek flows southwest and soon enters Lake Township. A short distance downstream, it picks up the tributary Bear Hollow Creek and turns south for several miles. The creek receives the tributary Paint Spring Run during this stretch. It eventually enters Lehman Township and turns southeast, crossing Pennsylvania Route 118. Slightly more than a mile (two kilometers) downstream, the creek turns south again. It eventually enters Jackson Township, where it crosses Pennsylvania Route 29 and picks up the tributary Pikes Creek. It then turns southeast and enters a valley, where it flows roughly parallel to Pennsylvania Route 29 for a number of miles. The creek enters Plymouth Township and soon afterwards turns abruptly southwest. Several miles downstream it enters the community of West Nanticoke. Here, it crosses U.S. Route 11 and reaches its confluence with the Susquehanna River.

Harveys Creek joins the Susquehanna River 181.02 miles (291.32 km) upstream of its mouth.

=== Tributaries ===
Harveys Creek has four named tributaries: Bear Hollow Creek, Paint Spring Run, Pikes Creek, and East Fork Harveys Creek. Bear Hollow Creek joins Harveys Creek in the latter creek's upper reaches. Paint Spring Run joins Harveys Creek 11.42 miles (18.38 km) upstream of its mouth. Its watershed has an area of 2.35 square miles (6.1 km^{2}). Pikes Creek joins Harveys Creek 5.60 miles (9.01 km) upstream of its mouth. Its watershed has an area of 11.6 square miles (30 km^{2}). East Fork Harveys Creek joins Harveys Creek 3.12 miles (5.02 km) upstream of its mouth. Its watershed has an area of 7.31 square miles (18.9 km^{2}).

== Hydrology and climate ==
High levels of nutrients have been observed in the waters of Harveys Creek and the tributary East Fork Harveys Creek. Harveys Creek has been described as having "degraded conditions". However, it is not considered to be impaired, although its tributary East Fork Harveys Creek is.

In the mid-1970s, the specific conductance of Harveys Creek at West Nanticoke ranged from 70 to 90 micro-siemens. The pH of the creek ranged from 6.5 to 7.8 and the concentration of dissolved oxygen ranged between 9.7 and 12.0 milligrams per liter. The concentration of water hardness ranged from 27 to 37 milligrams per liter.

During this time period, the concentration of carbon dioxide in the waters of Harveys Creek at West Nanticoke ranged from 0.3 to 8.7 milligrams per liter. The concentration of ammonia ranged from 0.026 to 0.077 milligrams per liter, the concentration of nitrogen in the form of nitrates ranged from 0.90 to 1.82 milligrams per liter, and the concentration of nitrogen in the form of nitrites ranged between 0.026 and 0.048 milligrams per liter. The concentration of phosphorus ranged from 0.040 to 0.160 milligrams per liter and the sulfate concentration ranged from 8.0 to 12.0 milligrams per liter. The chloride concentration ranged from 5.0 to 90.0 milligrams per liter. The concentration of magnesium in the waters of Harveys Creek at West Nanticoke ranged from 2.00 to 4.75 milligrams per liter. The concentration of calcium ranged between 6.40 and 8.80 milligrams per liter. The concentration of iron ranged from 120 to 740 micrograms per liter.

At the boundary between Lake Township and Lehman Township, the peak annual discharge of Harveys Creek has a 10 percent chance of reaching 1133 cubic feet per second. It has a 2 percent chance of reaching 2017 cubic feet per second, a 1 percent chance of reaching 2494 cubic feet per second, and a 0.2 percent chance of reaching 3909 cubic feet per second.

Upstream of the tributary Paint Spring Run, the peak annual discharge of Harveys Creek has a 10 percent chance of reaching 710 cubic feet per second. It has a 2 percent chance of reaching 1291 cubic feet per second and a 1 percent chance of reaching 1607 cubic feet per second. The peak annual discharge has a 0.2 percent chance of reaching 2553 cubic feet per second.

The average annual rate of precipitation in the watershed of Harveys Creek ranges from 35 to 45 inches (89 to 114 cm). The creek's water temperature is typically low, even in the summer. During the 1970s, the water temperature of the creek was as low as 3.0 to 3.5 °C (37.4 to 38.3 °F) in the winter and as high as 15.0 to 26.0 °C (59.0 to 78.8 °F) in the spring and summer.

== Geography ==
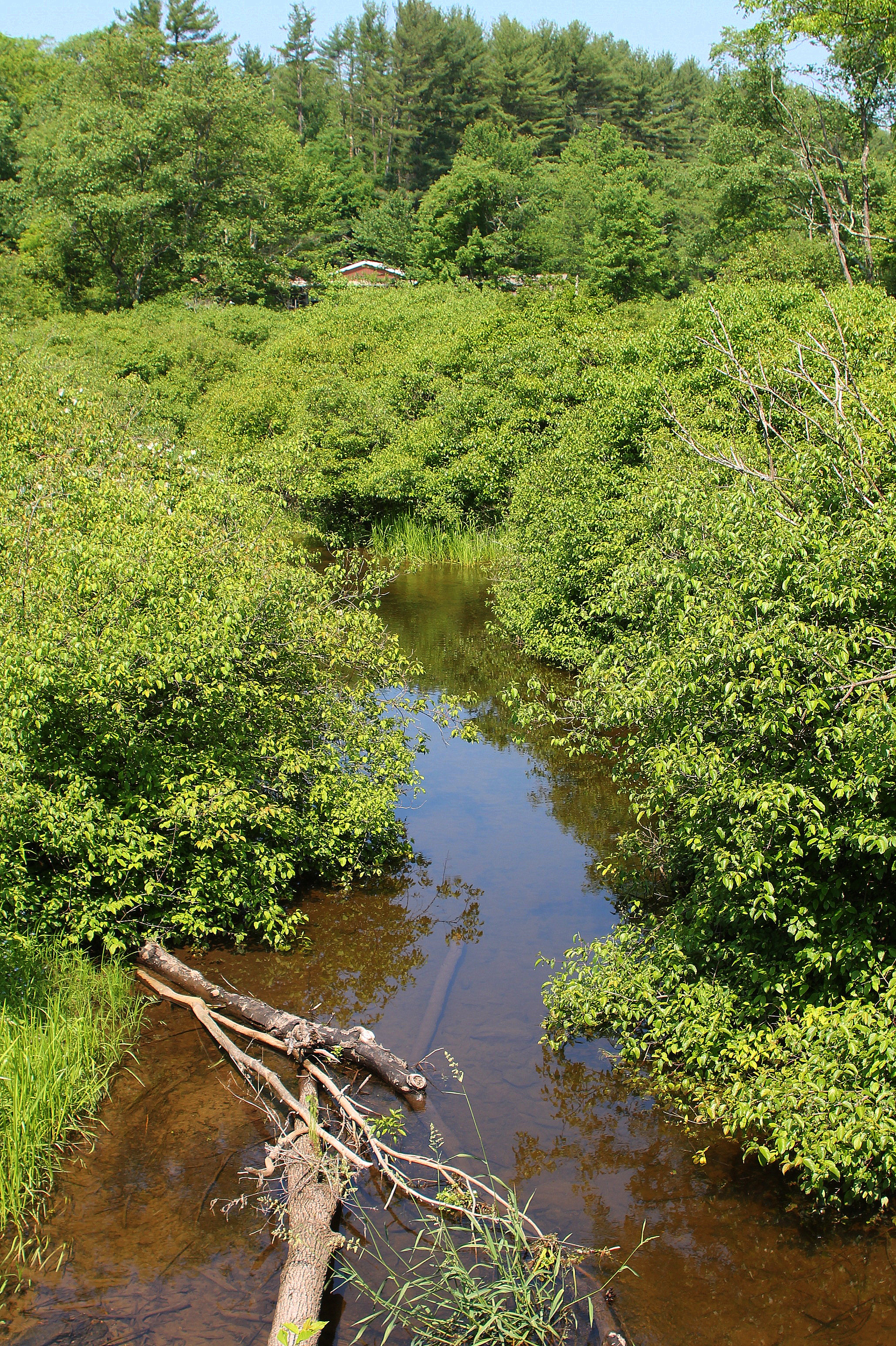
Harveys Creek looking upstream from Meeker Outlet Road

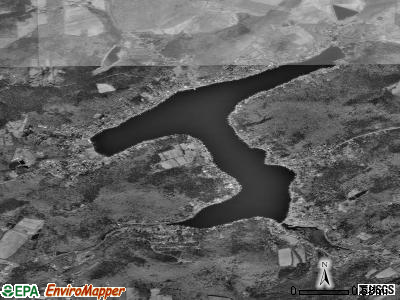
Harveys Lake, in the watershed of Harveys Creek

The elevation near the mouth of Harveys Creek is 518 feet (158 m) above sea level. The elevation of the creek's source is 1,226 feet (374 m) above sea level. Its elevation around river mile 4 (river kilometer 7) is 900 feet (270 m) above sea level. Upstream of this point, the creek's elevation decreases at a rate of 34.3 feet (10.5 m) per mile. Downstream of that point, its elevation decreases at a rate of 97.2 feet (29.6 m) per mile. Harveys Creek is in the Wyoming Valley.

Much of Harveys Creek, in its lower reaches, is in a forested gorge. The upper reaches of its watershed contain swamps and glacial lakes. The cliffs of Tilbury Knob are also situated near the mouth of the creek. The creek's source is in Harveys Lake, which is the largest natural lake in Pennsylvania. It flows in a generally southward direction.

The topography of the watershed of Harveys Creek is described as "rough and hilly" in a 1921 book. The creek's channel is sinuous and flows through rock formations consisting of sandstone and shale. The creek was described as having "rushing waters" in a 2001 article in the Times Leader.

== Watershed ==
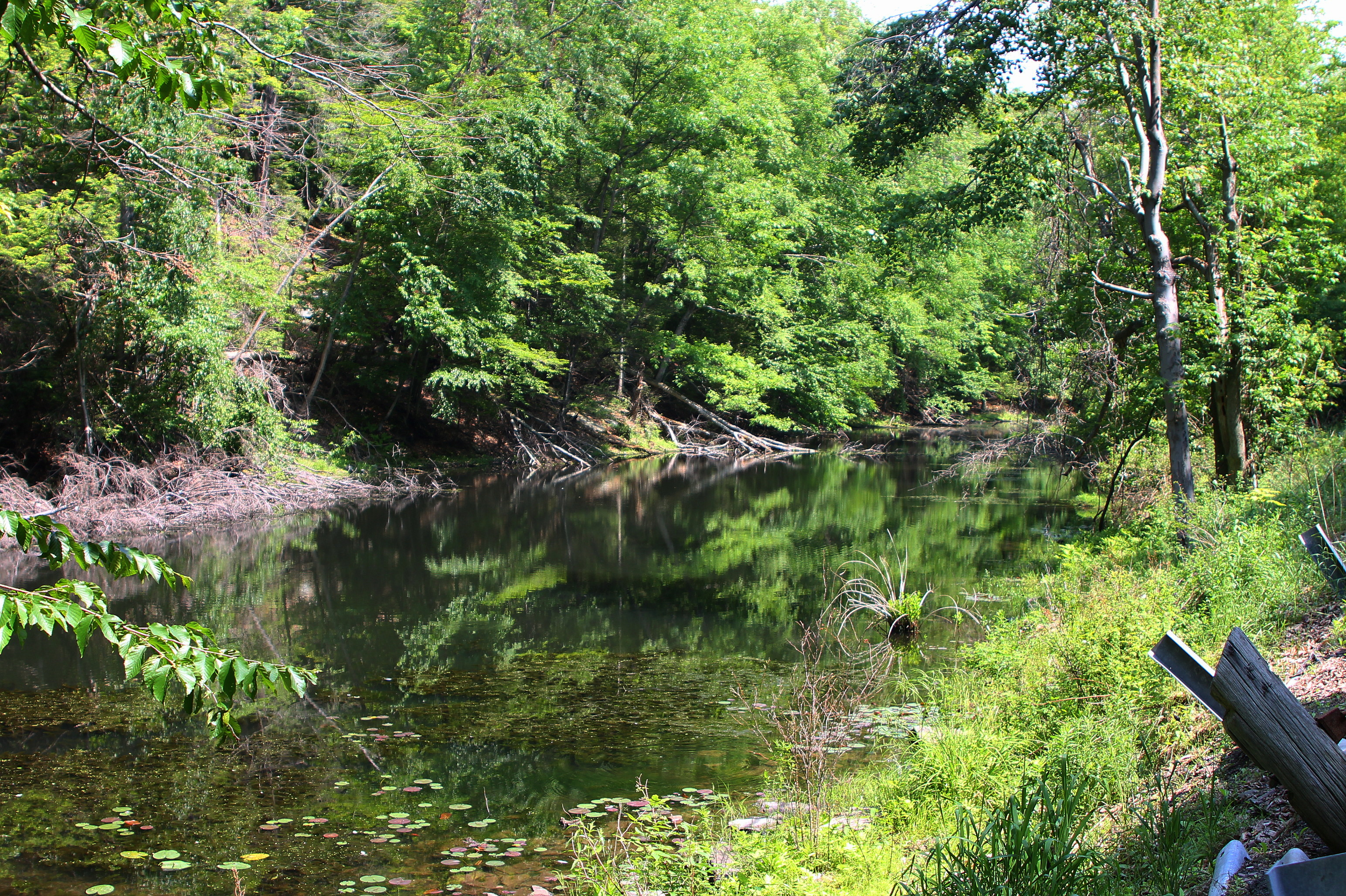
Harveys Creek looking upstream in its upper reaches

The watershed of Harveys Creek has an area of 46.3 square miles (120 km^{2}). The creek is in the Lower North Branch Susquehanna drainage basin. Its watershed is in the northwestern part of Luzerne County. Upstream of the boundary between Lake Township and Lehman Township, the watershed has an area of 14.24 square miles (36.9 km^{2}). Upstream of the tributary Paint Spring Run, its watershed has an area of only 10.72 square miles (27.8 km^{2}). The creek's mouth is in the United States Geological Survey quadrangle of Nanticoke. However, its source is in the quadrangle of Harveys Lake. Additionally, it flows through the quadrangles of Wilkes-Barre West and Kingston.

Harveys Creek is one of four major sources of flooding in Lake Township. The other three are Pikes Creek, Fades Creek, and Beaver Run. However, the floods of these creeks have not caused much damage since Lake Township is relatively undeveloped.

Lakes in the watershed of Harveys Creek include a natural lake known as Harveys Lake, which has a surface area of 658.6 acres. Pennsylvania Route 29 follows Harveys Creek for several miles.

Harveys Creek is dammed by a rockfill and earthfill dam known as Bryants Pond Dam. The dam is 425 feet (130 m) long, with a height of 19 feet (5.8 m).

Harveys Creek and its tributary Pikes Creek are used by the Pennsylvania American Water Company Ceasetown as a water supply for part or all of 15 municipalities and communities, including Wilkes-Barre, Nanticoke, Shickshinny, and others. As of 2002, the creeks supply 67,500 people with water. Pennsylvania American Water Company Ceasetown is permitted to take 16 million gallons of water per day from them.

== History ==
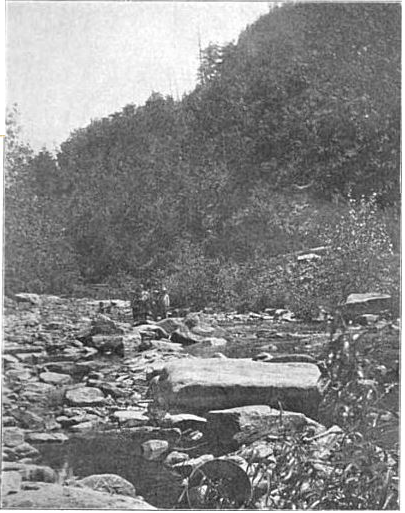
Harveys Creek at Tilbury Knob in 1899

The United States Board on Geographic Names made an official decision pertaining to Harveys Creek in 1950. Harveys Creek was entered into the Geographic Names Information System on August 2, 1979. Its identifier in the Geographic Names Information System is 1217352.

Historically, the Great Warrior Path of the Native Americans crossed Harveys Creek near its mouth. The path ran from Sunbury to Athens. In December 1775, a battle known as Plunkett's Battle was fought along the Susquehanna River very close to the creek. This battle was one of the major battles in the Yankee-Pennamite Wars.

The first schoolhouse in the lower part of Plymouth Township was built by Jameson Harvey near the mouth of Harveys Creek in 1834. The first mill in Lehman Township was built on the creek in 1837. In 1849, Johnathan Williams constructed a small mill on the creek. In 1869, a mining disaster occurred at the Avondale Mine just east of Harveys Creek. This event killed 108 people.

In the early 1900s, communities in the watershed of Harveys Creek included Alderson, West Nanticoke, Shawanese, Pikes Creek, Laketon, and Ceases Mills. Their populations in 1921 were 386, 300, 150, 76, 73, and 55, respectively. The main industries in the watershed at that time were agriculture and summer resorts. As early as the 1890s, the Nanticoke Water Company (which was formed in 1885) pumped water from the creek via gravity lines. In the early 1900s, Harveys Creek and its tributary Pikes Creek were used as a water supply by the Spring Brook Water Supply Company. The creeks supplied Nanticoke, West Nanticoke, Plymouth, and Glen Lyon.

In 2001, the Pennsylvania Fish and Boat Commission banned alcoholic beverages within 25 feet (7.6 m) of an 8.5-mile-stretch of Harveys Creek.

=== Bridges ===
A steel girder and floorbeam system bridge carrying T-486/East Poplar Street was constructed over Harveys Creek in 1924. It is 53.2 feet (16.2 m) long. A two-span concrete tee beam bridge carrying Pennsylvania Route 29 over the creek was built in 1927 and repaired in 1980. It is in Jackson Township and is 78.1 feet (23.8 m) long. In 1935, another two-span concrete tee beam bridge, this one carrying Pennsylvania Route 118, was constructed over the creek. It is 56.1 feet (17.1 m) long and is in Lehman Township. Another two-span bridge, this one a steel stringer bridge, was constructed over the creek in Lehman Township in 1952. It is 69.9 feet (21.3 m) long and carries State Route 1016.

A four-span steel culvert bridge carrying State Route 1048/Meeker Road over Harveys Creek was built in 1977. It is 29.9 feet (9.1 m) long and is in Lehman Township. In 1992, a prestressed box beam bridge was built over the creek. It is 39.0 feet (11.9 m) long and carries T-497/Pavlick Road. A bridge of the same type and length, but carrying T-499/Zbick Road was built over the creek in 1993. One more bridge of the same type was built over the creek in Lehman Township in 1997. It is 40.0 feet (12.2 m) long and carries State Route 1059/Fedor Road.

A bridge carrying Pennsylvania Route 29 over Harveys Creek in Plymouth Township was built in 2005. It is a two-span prestressed box beam bridge with a length of 84.0 feet (25.6 m).

== Biology ==
Upstream of the tributary Pikes Creek, Harveys Creek and its drainage basin are designated as a High-Quality Coldwater Fishery and a Migratory Fishery. Downstream of Pikes Creek, Harveys Creek and its drainage basin are designated as a Coldwater Fishery and a Migratory Fishery. Wild trout naturally reproduce in a stretch of the creek from Meeker Outlet Road/T810, downstream to its mouth. This stretch is 10.86 miles (17.48 km) long.

Harveys Creek is inhabited by brown trout and native brook trout. It is stocked with fish.

== Recreation ==
It is possible to canoe on 5.4 miles (8.7 km) of Harveys Creek during a fast snowmelt or within two days of heavy rain. Its difficulty rating ranges between 2 and 4 and Edward Gertler describes the scenery along the creek as "good to very good" in his book Keystone Canoeing. Gertler also describes it as an "obscure torrent". The creek is considered to be suitable for advanced paddlers.

In the late 1980s, Harveys Creek was the most popular trout stream in Luzerne County. A 1991 book stated that the creek was the most extensively stocked and fished stream in the county.

== See also ==
- Hunlock Creek, next tributary on the west side of the Susquehanna River going downriver
- Coal Creek, next tributary on the west side of the Susquehanna River going upriver
- List of rivers of Pennsylvania
