= Plymouth Township, Luzerne County, Pennsylvania =

Township in Pennsylvania, US

Coordinates: 41°15′30″N 75°57′59″W

- Township
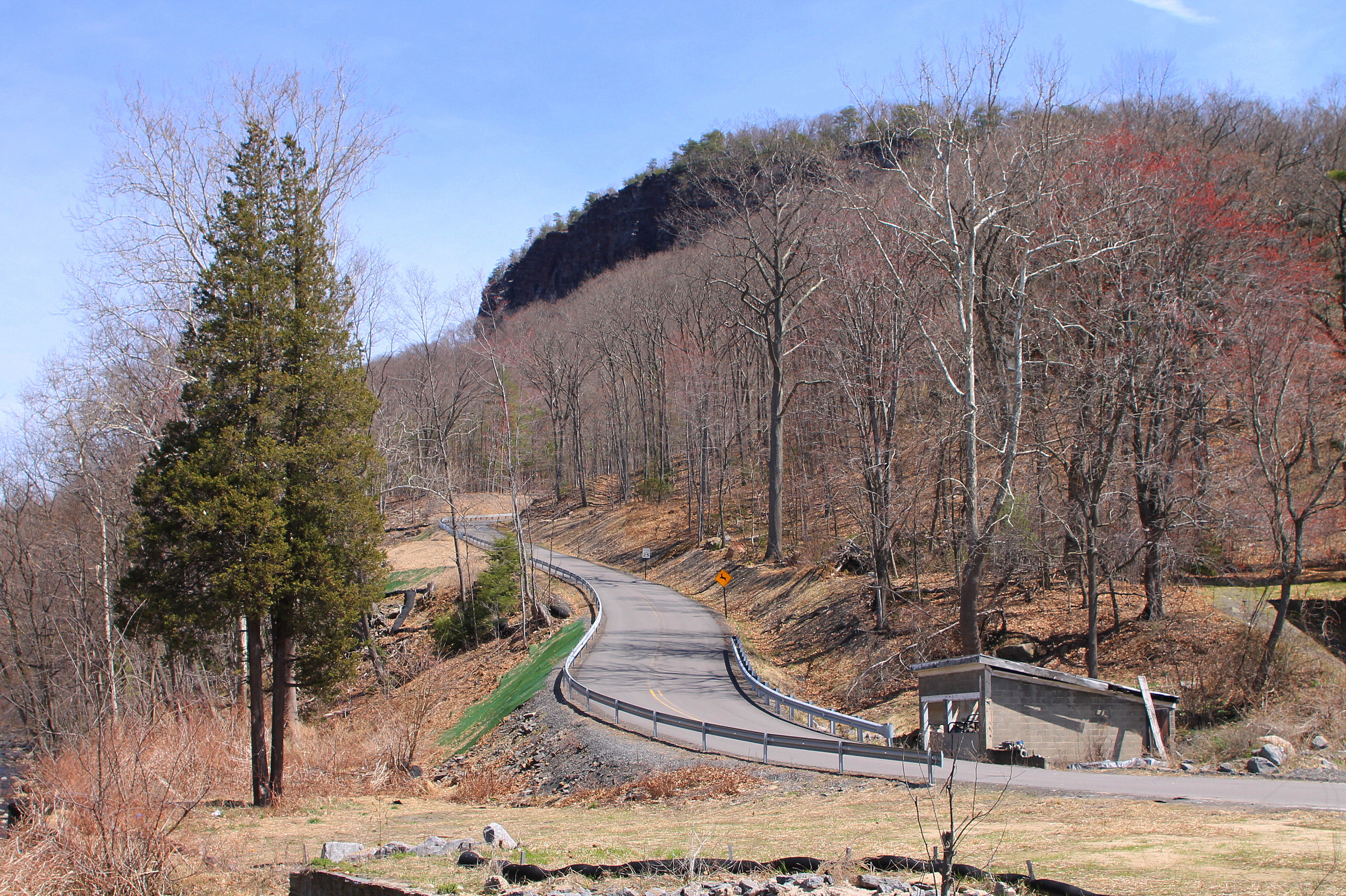
- Scenery of Plymouth Township

- Logo

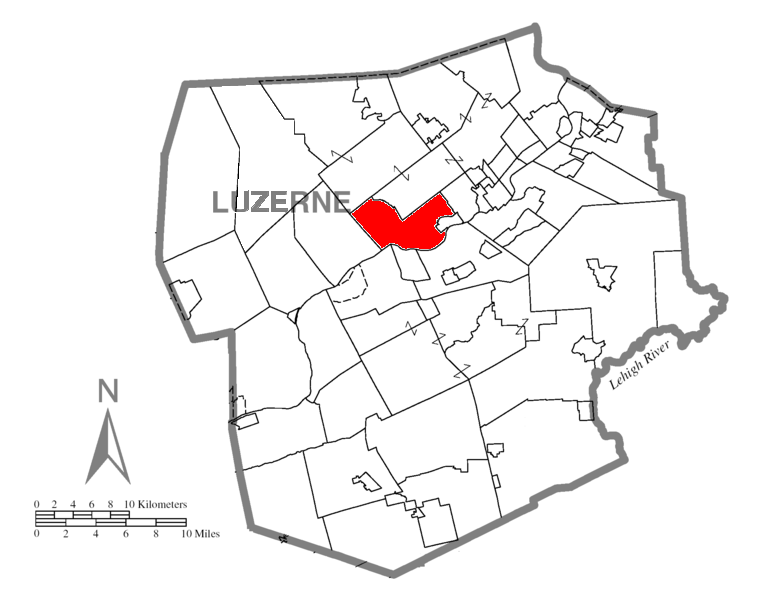
- Map of Luzerne County highlighting Plymouth Township

- Map of Pennsylvania highlighting Luzerne County
- Country: United States
- State: Pennsylvania
- County: Luzerne

Area
  - Total: 16.43 sq mi (42.55 km^{2})
  - Land: 15.93 sq mi (41.25 km^{2})
  - Water: 0.50 sq mi (1.30 km^{2})

Population (2020)
  - Total: 1,712 ▼
  - Estimate (2021): 1,709
  - Density: 111.6/sq mi (43.08/km^{2})
- Time zone: UTC-5 (Eastern (EST))
  - Summer (DST): UTC-4 (EDT)
- FIPS code: 42-079-61656
- Website: plymouthtownshippa.gov

Plymouth Township is a township located in Luzerne County, Pennsylvania, United States. The population was 1,712 at the 2020 census.

== History ==
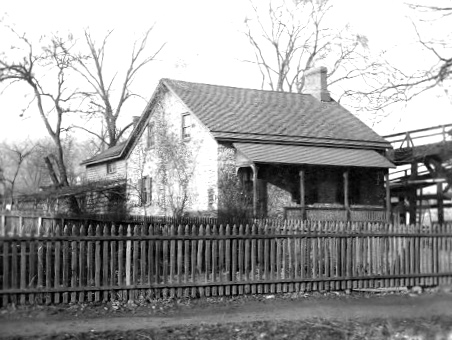
Built circa 1780

=== Settlement ===
Plymouth Township was formed in December 1768 by the Susquehanna Company of Connecticut; it was one of the five original townships in the Wyoming Valley. Each township was five square miles. It was enlarged in 1790 to include what is now Jackson Township, but reduced in 1844 by the formation of Jackson as a separate township, and in 1877 by the formation of Hunlock Township. Further reductions occurred when Plymouth Borough was incorporated in 1866, and Larksville Borough was incorporated in 1909. The western half of Edwardsville Borough was annexed from Plymouth Township in 1884.

In 1769, the Susquehanna Company of Connecticut allotted lands in Plymouth Township to forty settlers. The growth of the township's population was very slow. The first settlements were in and around present-day Plymouth Borough. The township was governed by an elected board of three men. The first mills in Plymouth Township were built in 1780. In 1834, Jameson Harvey built the first schoolhouse in the lower end of the township (near the mouth of Harveys Creek).

=== Conflicts ===
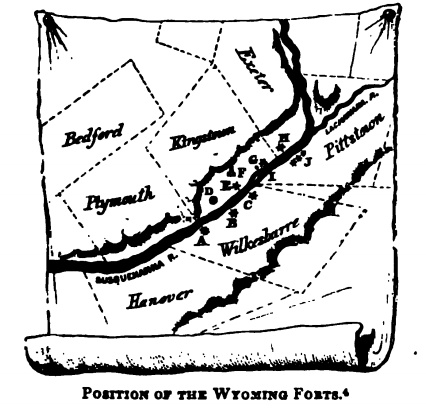
Wyoming Valley in 1778: Battlefield of Wyoming (G); Plymouth Township is visible on the left.

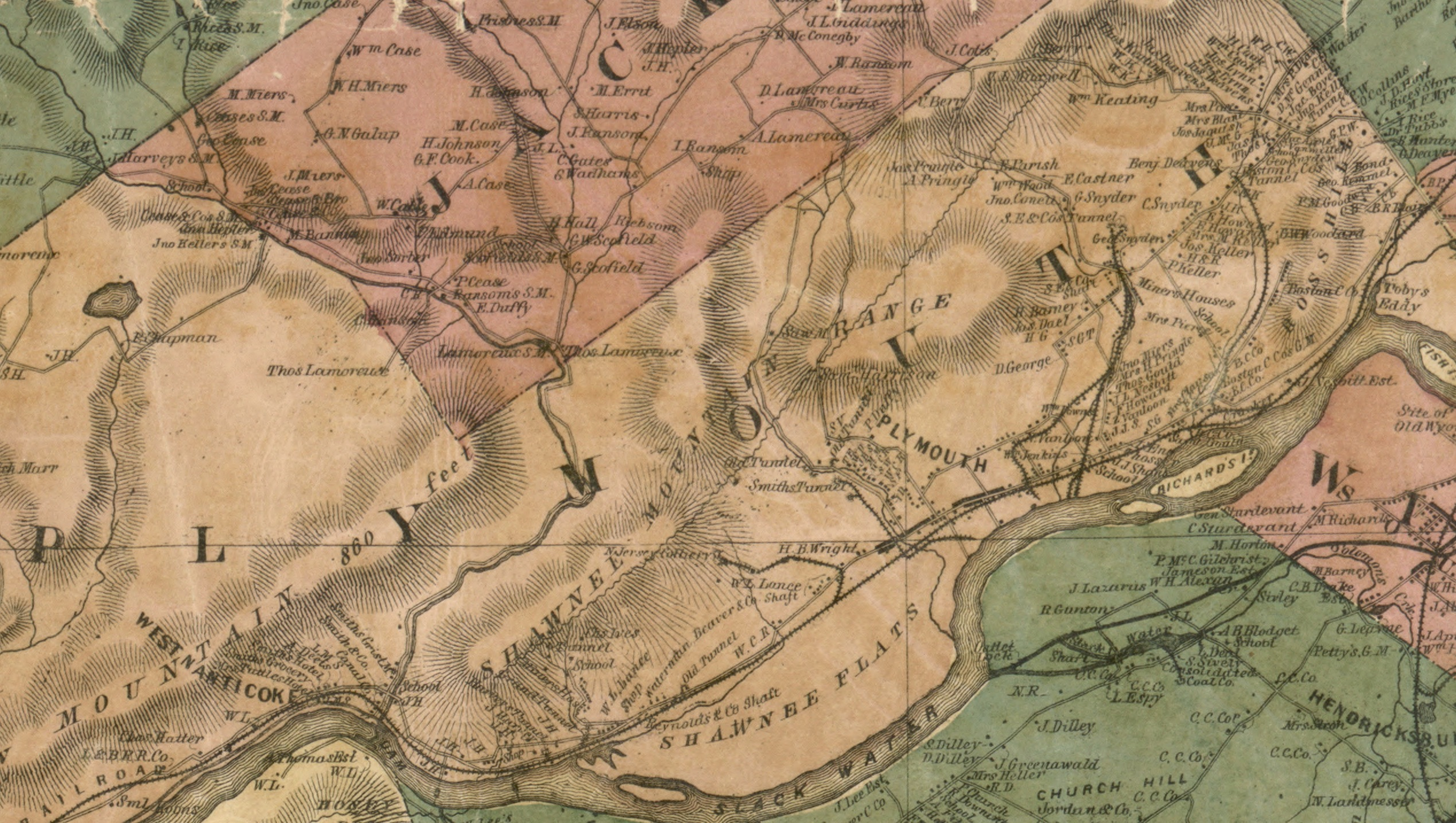
Plymouth Township in 1864; Ross Hill is visible on the right.

From 1769 to 1785, the Connecticut settlers in Plymouth were harassed on a regular basis by the Pennamites, Native Americans, and Tories. A series of clashes, which were part of the Revolutionary War and the Pennamite-Yankee Wars, occurred between the multiple parties. During the Revolutionary War, the settlers erected a small fortification on "Garrison Hill", in the lower portion of modern-day Plymouth Borough. The fort saw action in defending the colonists from Native American raids.

Nearly fifty men from Plymouth took part in the disastrous Battle of Wyoming (in 1778). Many of the men were slain in the fight. The women and children of Plymouth Township fled down the Susquehanna River on the night of the battle. As soon as the British left the region, the settlers moved back to the township. They had to rebuild what was destroyed by the British (Tories) and Native Americans. Native American raids continued well after the battle. On November 17, 1778, John Perkins was killed in the lower end of the township. At least three settlers were killed and one was captured in March 1779. Native American raids like these continued in the coming years.

In March 1783, a massive ice flood on the Susquehanna River struck Plymouth. Nearly all the buildings on "Garrison Hill" were swept away. Reverend Benjamin Bidlack was carried away with his house. After being tossed around by the current and huge pieces of ice throughout the night, he managed to reach higher ground on the lower end of Shawnee Flats (in Plymouth Township). After the flood, the Pennamites were determined to expel the Connecticut settlers from the territory. The colonists were driven from their homes by soldiers. Several of the Connecticut settlers died along the journey.

This cruel act aroused empathy amongst the people of Pennsylvania in favor of the Connecticut settlers. The authorities of the state directed for the settlers to repossess their lands. The settlers gradually moved back to the Wyoming Valley. However, before reentering the valley, they halted on the mountains overlooking Wilkes-Barre. They sent forward a small group of men to see if it were safe to reenter the valley. Alexander Patterson, the civil magistrate of Wilkes-Barre, detained the men, who were then beaten with iron ramrods. Despite these actions, the settlers proceeded cautiously to their homes. Once the settlers returned home, Patterson's men attacked. The skirmish occurred on the western slope of Ross Hill. It's believed that at least two settlers were killed in the struggle. The enraged settlers placed themselves under the command of John Franklin to avenge the deaths of their fellow colonists. After marching through the countryside, they successfully cleared the territory of any hostile threats.

Plunkett's Battle occurred along the riverbank of the Susquehanna (above the mouth of Harveys Creek) on December 4, 1785; it was part of the Pennamite-Yankee Wars. Plymouth provided most of the soldiers (who were under the command of Colonel Butler). The number of casualties from the battle are unknown, but it's believed that at least three men were killed in the skirmish.

=== Coal mining ===
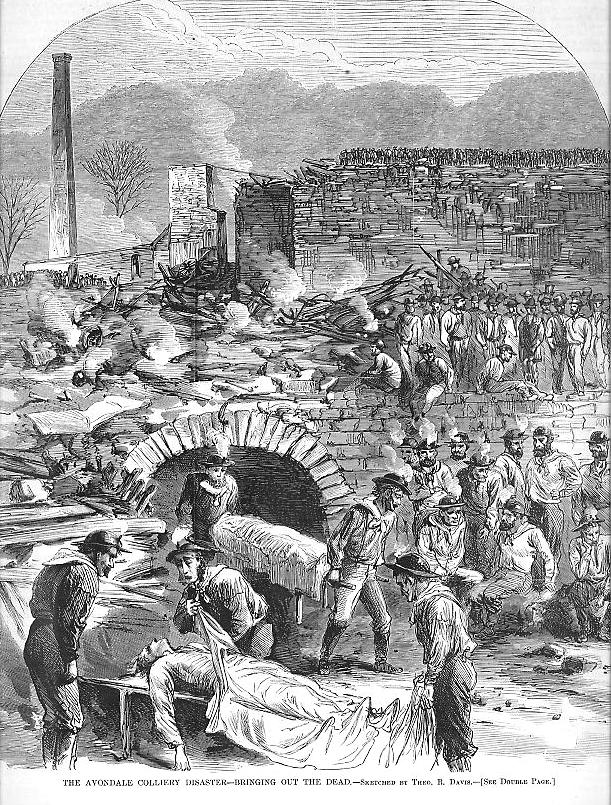
Aftermath of the Avondale Mine Disaster

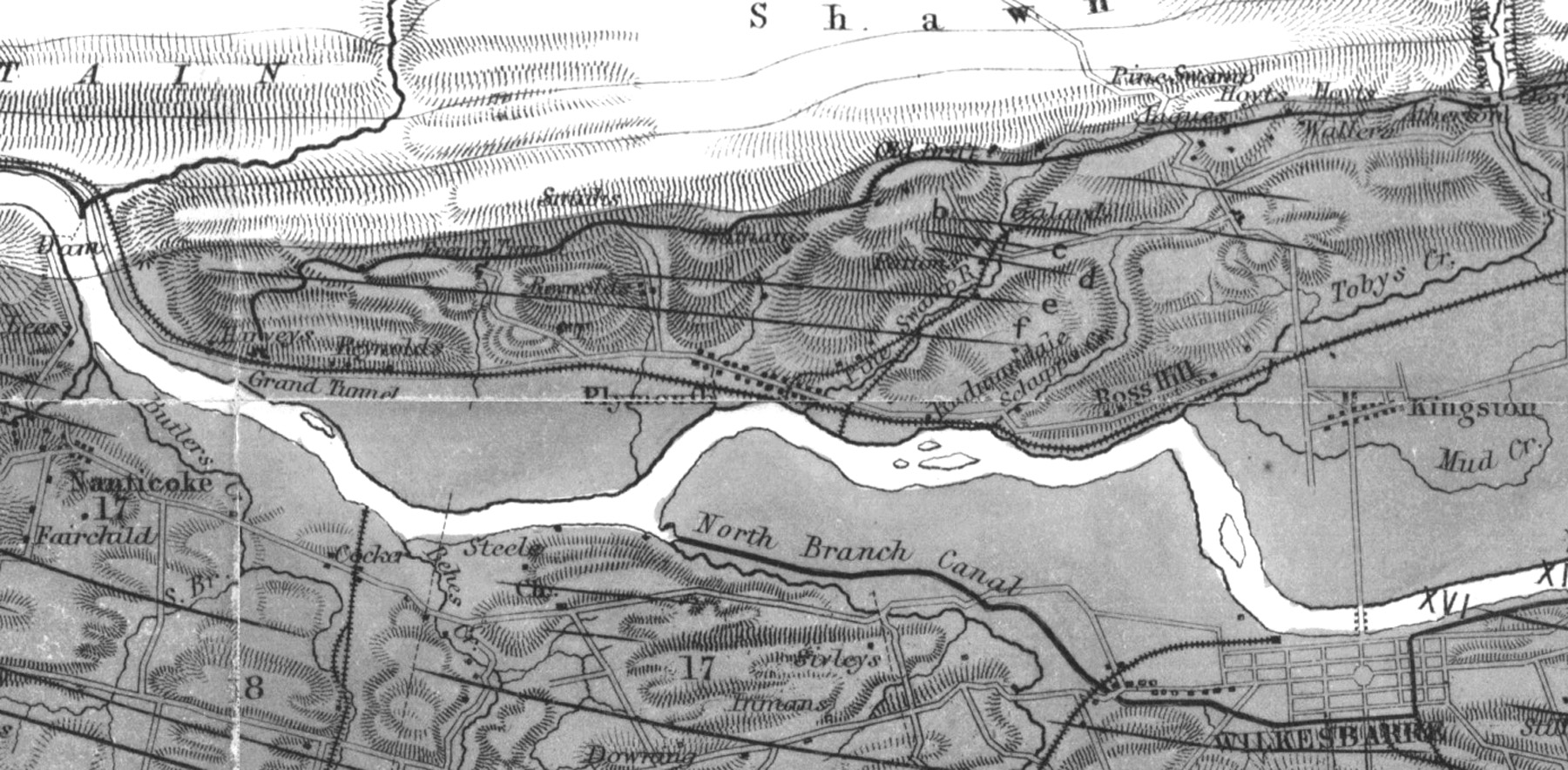
Anthracite coal basin (shown in dark grey) below Plymouth Township's surface, 1858

About 1806, Abijah Smith came to Plymouth from Derby, Connecticut, intending to mine, ship, and sell coal. Smith and his business partner, Lewis Hepburn, bought a 75-acre plot (called Lots 45 and 46) on the east side of Coal Creek. In the fall of 1807, Smith floated an ark down the Susquehanna River loaded with about fifty tons of anthracite coal; it was shipped to Columbia in Lancaster County. As time progressed, additional coal mines and collieries were constructed throughout the township. Railroads and canals were also constructed to aid in the transportation of coal. Coal mining remained the chief industry in Plymouth Township well into the 20th century.

The Avondale Mine disaster was a massive fire in Avondale, an unincorporated community in Plymouth Township, on September 6, 1869. It caused the death of 110 workers. It started when the wooden lining of the mine shaft caught fire and ignited the coal breaker built directly overhead. The shaft was the only entrance and exit to the mine, and the fire trapped and suffocated 108 of the workers (the other two fatalities were rescuers). It was the greatest mine disaster at that point in Pennsylvania history.

On February 9, 1935, the Glen Alden Coal Company began to dismantle and demolish the Avondale breaker and to close the mine. In 1936, no coal was produced. However, in December 1940, Glen Alden Coal Company resumed mining on a limited scale taking coal to the Lance Breaker to be processed.

== Geography ==
According to the United States Census Bureau, the township has a total area of 16.4 square miles (42.5 km^{2}), of which 15.9 square miles (41.2 km^{2}) is land and 0.50 square miles (1.3 km^{2}), or 3.06%, is water. It is drained by the Susquehanna River (which forms its southern border). The township's villages include Avondale, Ceasetown (also in Jackson Township), and West Nanticoke. Moon Lake Park is located in the northwestern part of Plymouth Township. Most of the municipality is made up of forested mountains (with very little farmland). Its numbered roads are U.S. 11 and PA 29. While U.S. 11 follows the bank of the river, PA 29 comes down from the Back Mountain via Harveys Creek gorge; it links up with U.S. 11 in West Nanticoke. PA 29 then crosses over the river and links up with Hanover Township.

=== Neighboring municipalities ===
Jackson
		north	northeast	Lehman
Hunlock	west	self	east	Larksville
Newport	southwest	south	southeast	Plymouth Borough
Hanover, Nanticoke

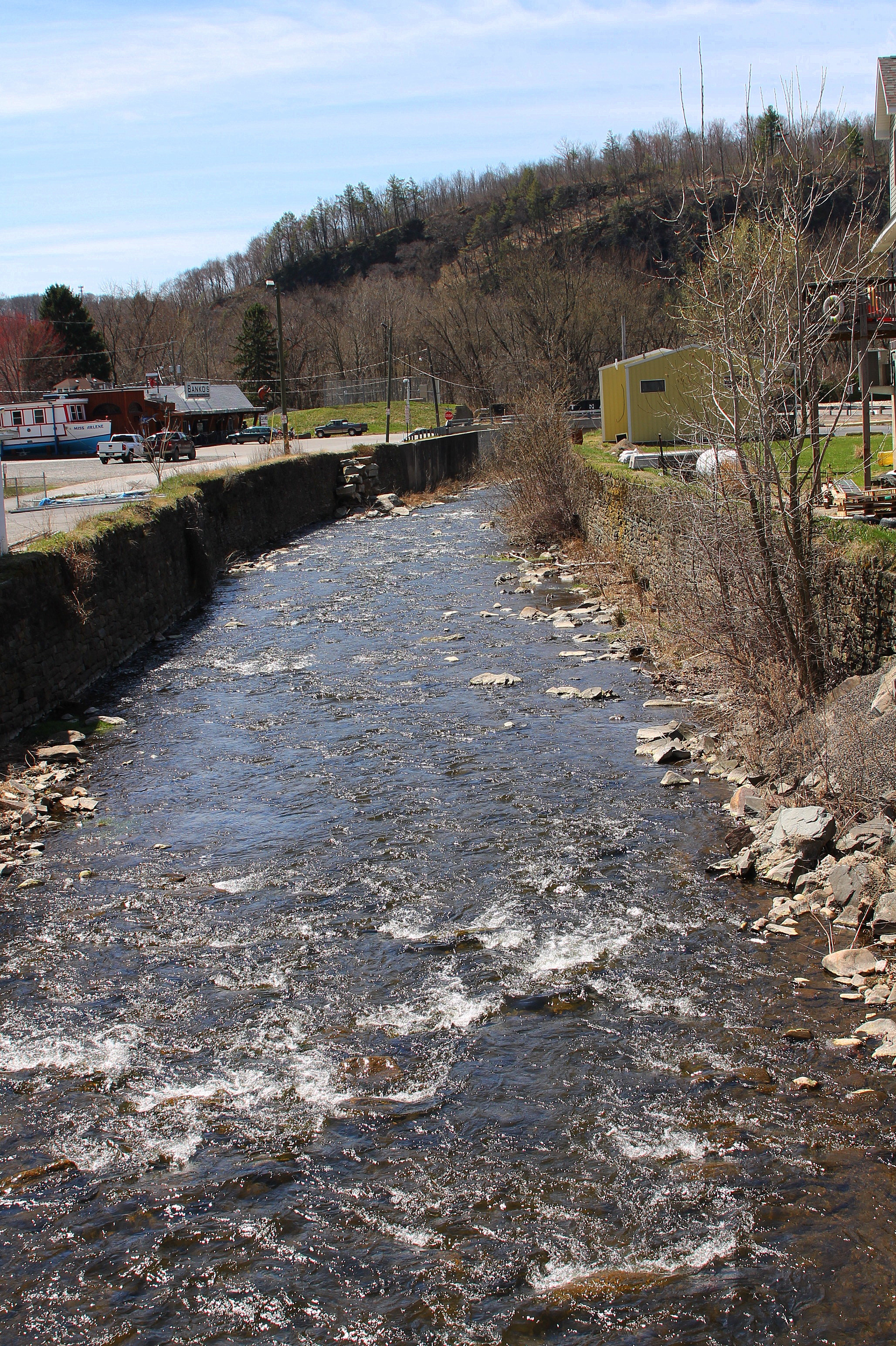
Harveys Creek looking downstream in West Nanticoke

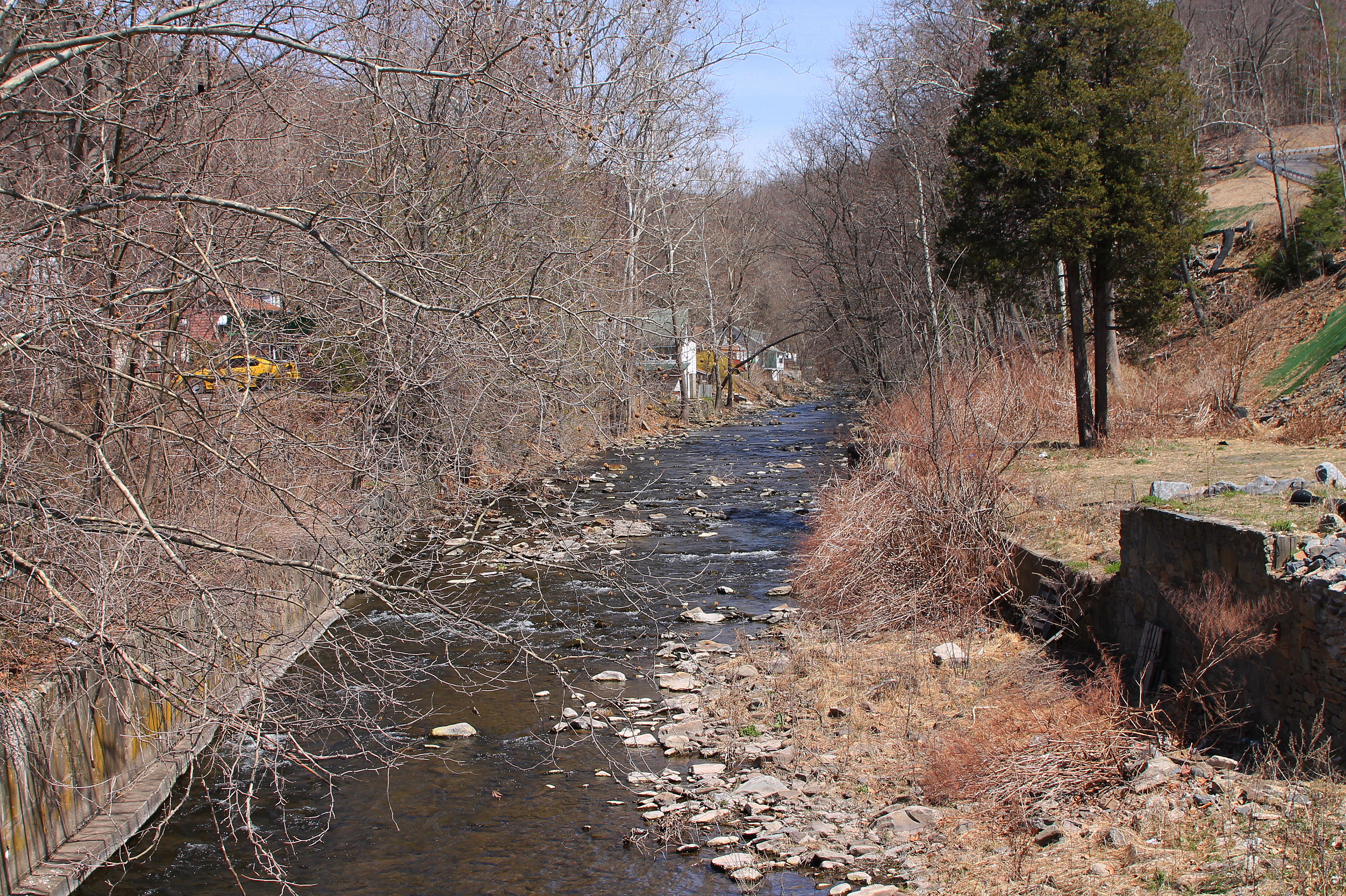
Harveys Creek looking upstream in West Nanticoke

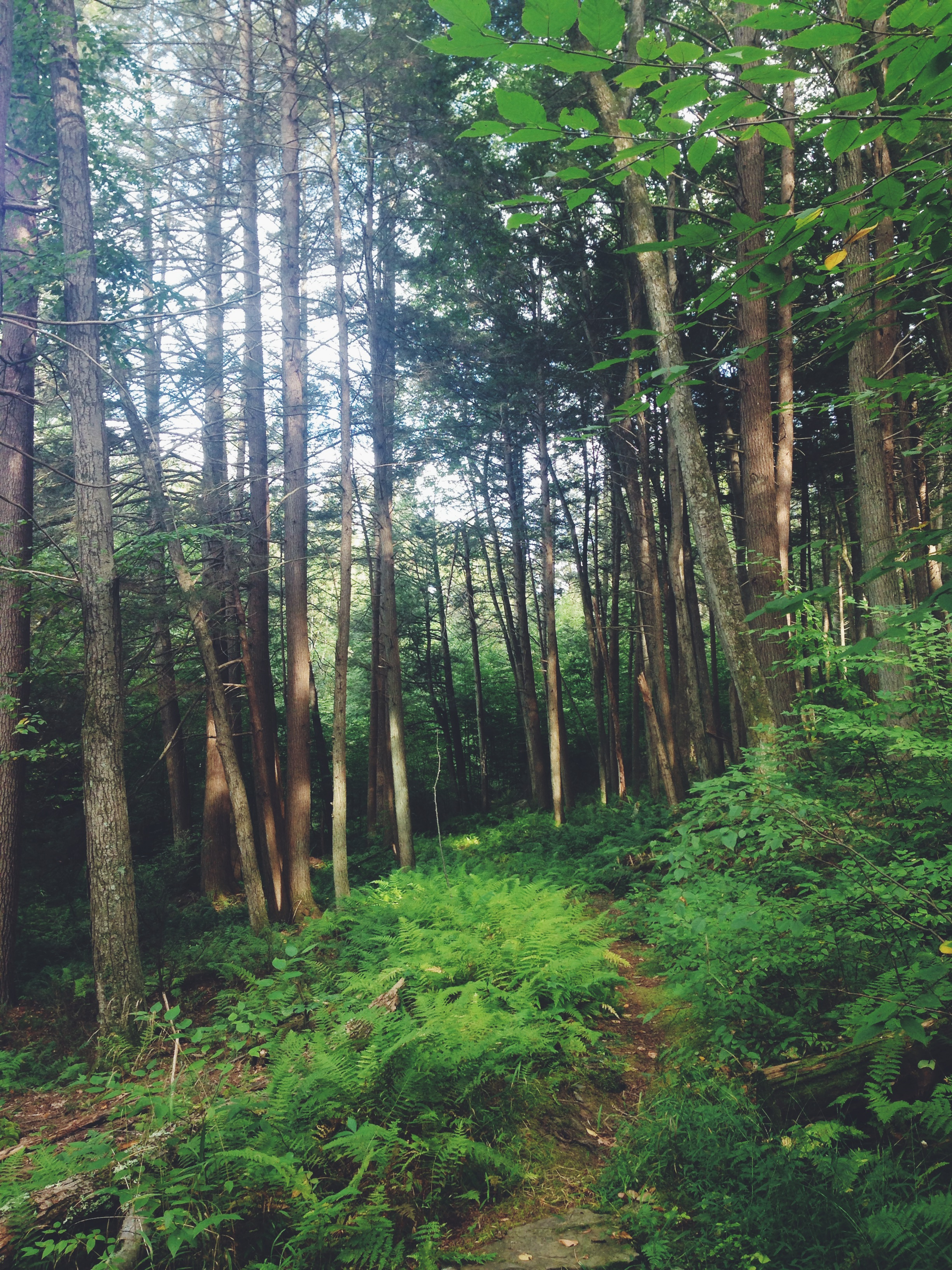
Old-growth forest in Moon Lake Park

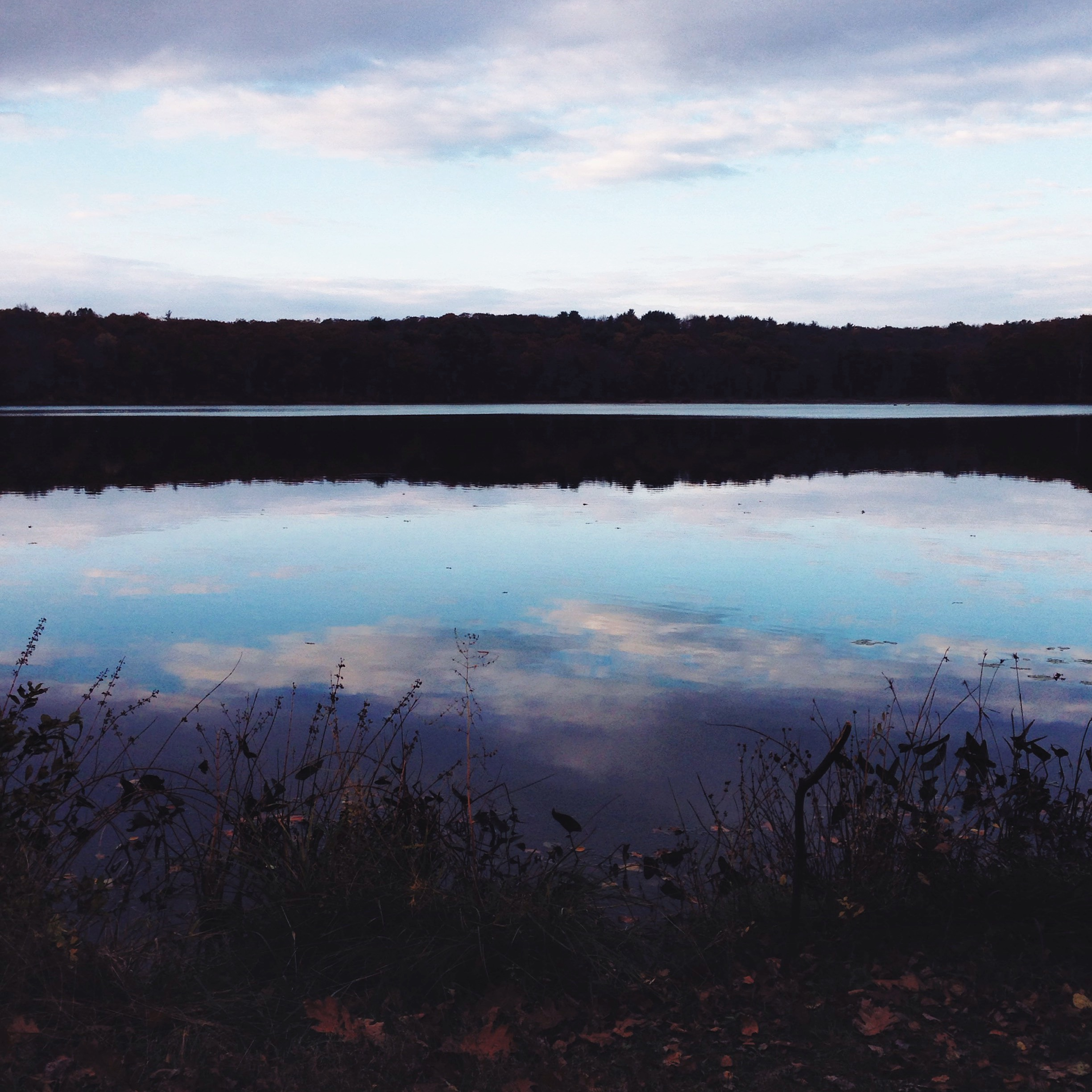
Moon Lake at dusk

== Demographics ==
Historical population
Census	Pop.	Note	%±
2010	1,812		—
2020	1,712		−5.5%
2021 (est.)	1,709		−0.2%
U.S. Decennial Census

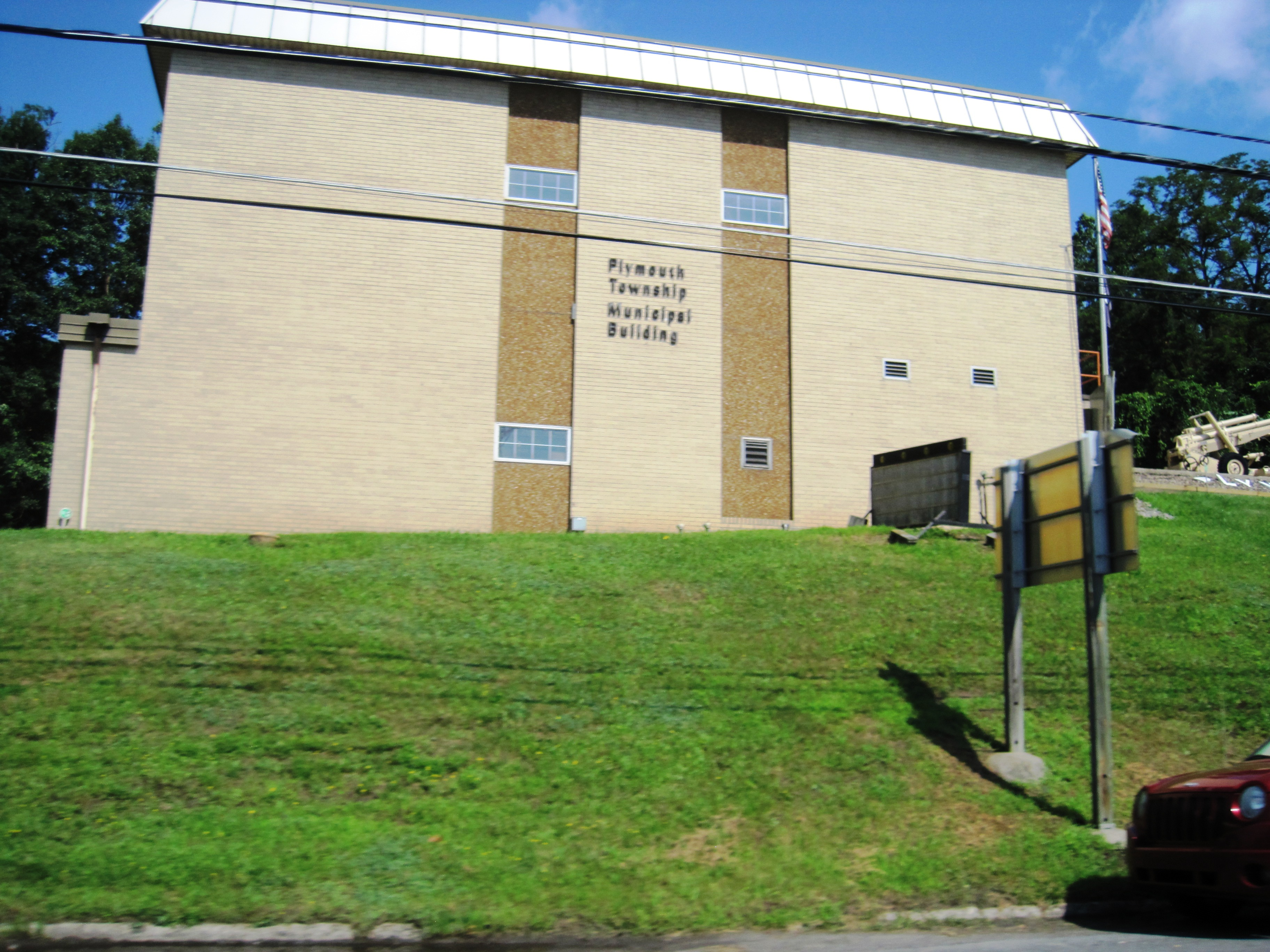
Plymouth Township Municipal Building

The 2010 census indicates that the township population consists of 1,812 people, 780 total households, and 530 families. The racial makeup of the township was 98.6% White, 0.4% African American, 0.1% American Indian and Alaskan Native, 0.7% from other races, and 0.3% from two or more races. Hispanic or Latino of any race made up 0.9% of the population.

There were 780 households, out of which 38.1% had children under the age of 18 living with them, 404 were married couples living together, and 82 females owned homes with no husband present. The average household size was 2.32 and the average family size was 2.80.

In the township, the population was spread out, with 20.0% under the age of 20, 4.7% from 20 to 24, 23.9% from 25 to 44, 32.4% from 45 to 64, and 18.7% who were 65 years of age or older. The median age was 40 years. For every 100 females, there were 101.1 males. For every 100 females age 18 and over, there were 98.7 males.
