= Lake Township, Luzerne County, Pennsylvania =

Township in Pennsylvania, US

Coordinates: 41°22′36″N 76°07′59″W

- Township
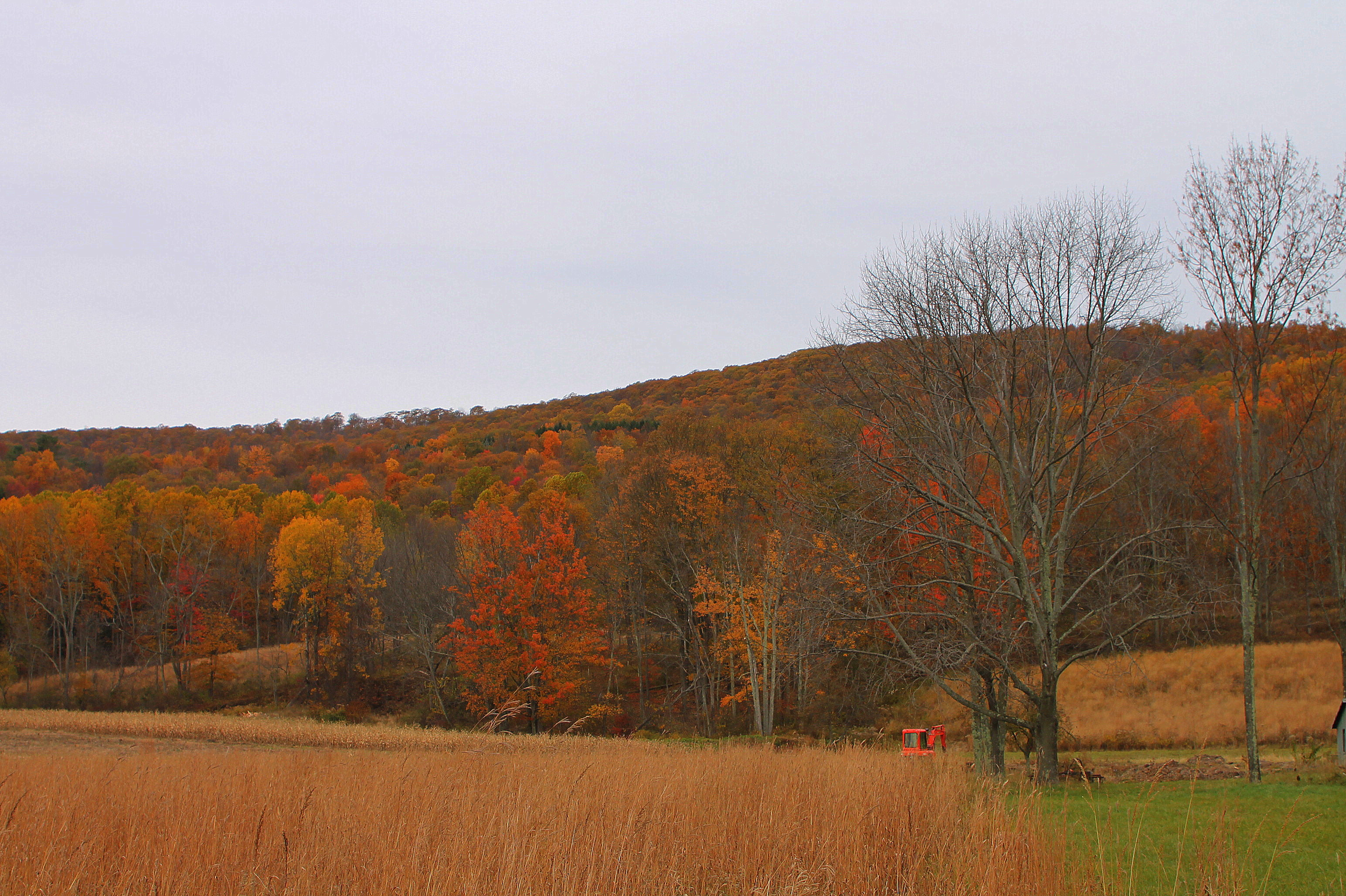
- Sorber Mountain in Lake Township

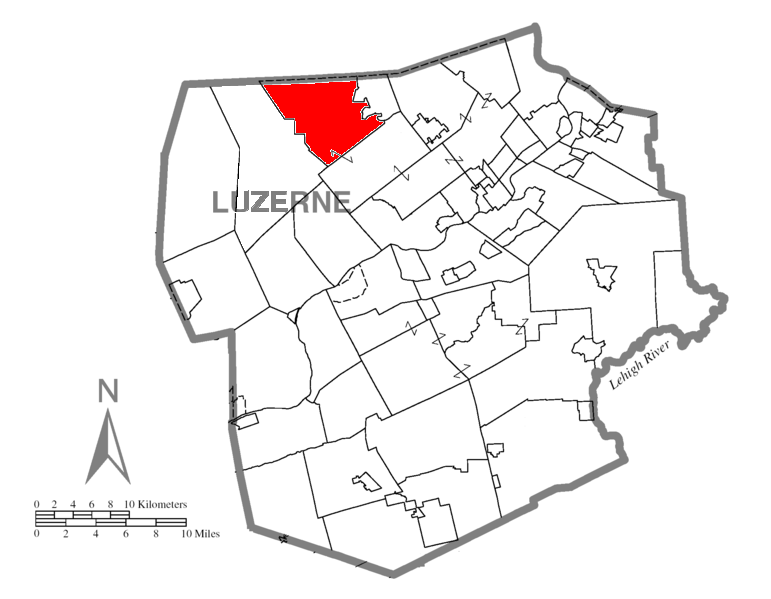
- Map of Luzerne County highlighting Lake Township

- Map of Pennsylvania highlighting Luzerne County
- Country: United States
- State: Pennsylvania
- County: Luzerne
- Incorporated: 1841

Area
  - Total: 26.69 sq mi (69.12 km^{2})
  - Land: 26.67 sq mi (69.07 km^{2})
  - Water: 0.019 sq mi (0.05 km^{2})

Population (2020)
  - Total: 1,994 ▼
  - Estimate (2021): 1,999
  - Density: 75.9/sq mi (29.32/km^{2})
- Time zone: UTC-5 (Eastern (EST))
  - Summer (DST): UTC-4 (EDT)
- FIPS code: 42-079-40920
- Website: www.laketwppa.com

Lake Township is a township that is located in Luzerne County, Pennsylvania, United States. It is part of the Back Mountain, a 118-square mile region in northern Luzerne County. The population was 1,994 at the time of the 2020 census.

== History ==
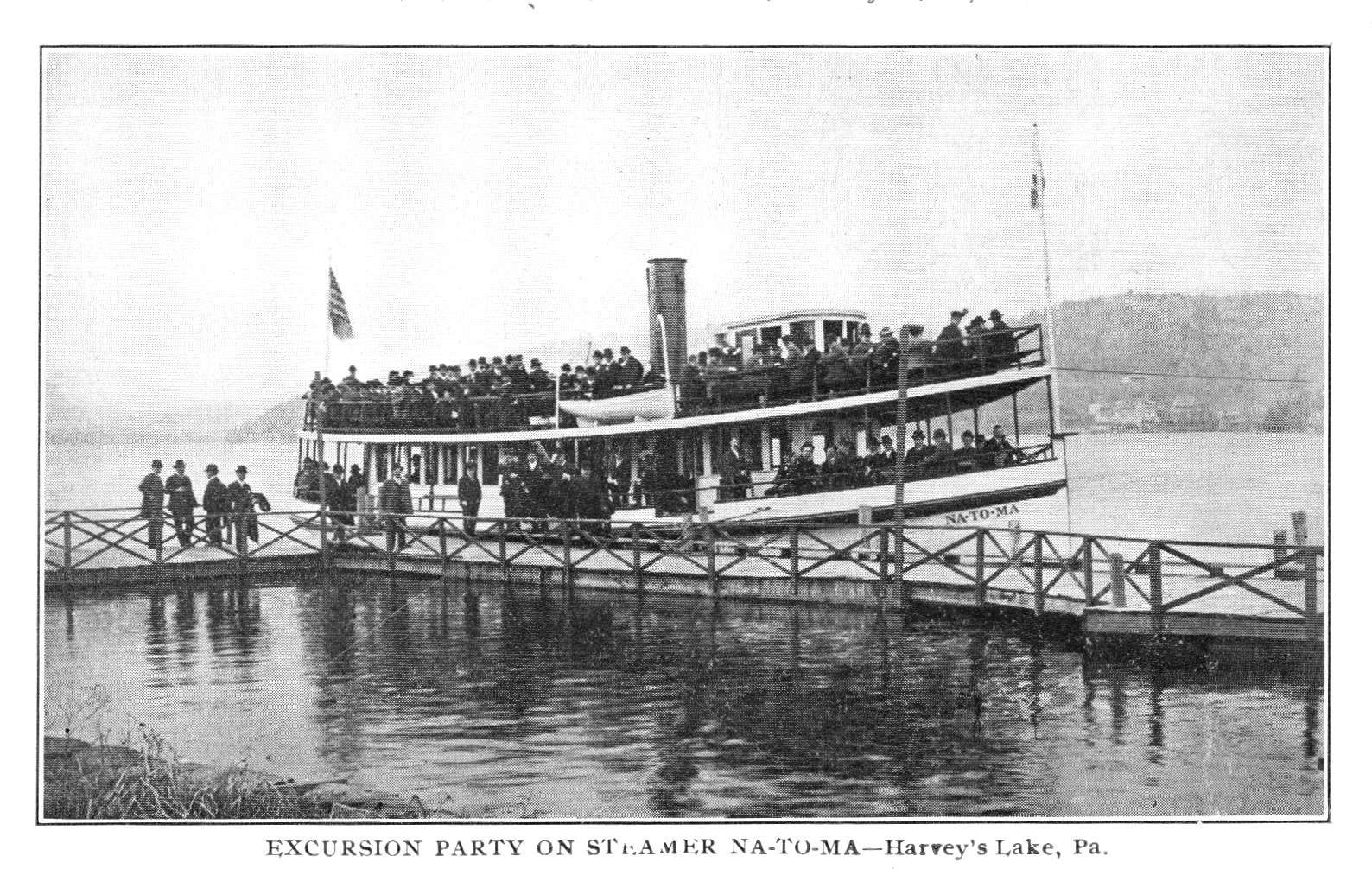
Steamboat on Harveys Lake, c. 1910

The first white man who lived in modern-day Lake Township was Matthew Scouten (in the 1790s). Hollenback & Urquhart would later own much of the territory, and was responsible for building the first sawmill in 1839 and the first gristmill in 1840. Every mill belonging to Hollenback & Urquhart was later transferred over to the Hoffman Lumber Company. At the time, due to the abundance of trees, the lumber industry was one of the major employers in the region.

Lake Township was formed in 1841 from territory taken from Lehman and Monroe Townships. It was named after Harveys Lake, which was originally part of the township. In 1842, Wyoming County was formed and the county line cut off a portion of Lake Township, which was given back to Monroe Township (now in Wyoming County).

The Harveys Lake and Towanda Branch of the Lehigh Valley Railroad was built during the late 1800s. It ran directly from Wilkes-Barre to Harveys Lake.

During the 1890s, railroad lines were established from the lake to the communities of Pittston and Towanda. Harveys Lake became a major tourist destination in the township. Warden Place and Sandy Beach became popular recreational areas near the lake in the early 1900s.

Within this same time period, there were three hotels, two hundred cottages, sixty boathouses, and four steamboats on Harveys Lake. The steamers were used for carrying passengers and freight. Recreational steamboat rides on the lake were commonplace between 1900 and 1920. In 1968, Lake Township lost its major tourist attraction — Harveys Lake. The region around the lake broke away from the township and was incorporated as a borough.

Today, the township is made up of thick forests and farmland.

== Geography ==
According to the United States Census Bureau, the township has a total area of 26.7 square miles (69.1 km^{2}), of which 26.7 square miles (69.1 km^{2}) is land and 0.07% is water. Pikes Creek is a village in Lake Township. PA 29 runs north to south through the center of the municipality. PA 118 travels east to west through the southernmost portion of the township. The northwestern portion is made up of mountains and thick forests. The eastern and southern sections of the township are made up of hills, forests, and farms.

== Demographics ==
Historical population
Census	Pop.	Note	%±
2000	2,110		—
2010	2,049		−2.9%
2020	1,994		−2.7%
2021 (est.)	1,999		0.3%
U.S. Decennial Census

As of the census of 2000, there were 2,110 people, 800 households, and 588 families residing in the township. The population density was 78.2 inhabitants per square mile (30.2/km^{2}). There were 865 housing units at an average density of 32.1 per square mile (12.4/km^{2}).

The racial makeup of the township was 99.19% White, 0.19% Native American, 0.14% Asian, 0.14% Pacific Islander, 0.14% from other races, and 0.19% from two or more races. Hispanic or Latino of any race were 0.19% of the population.

There were 800 households, out of which 32.4% had children under the age of eighteen living with them; 60.4% were married couples living together, 8.9% had a female householder with no husband present, and 26.4% were non-families. 21.1% of all households were made up of individuals, and 10.5% had someone living alone who was sixty-five years of age or older. The average household size was 2.59 and the average family size was 3.01.

Within the township, the population was spread out, with 23.6% under the age of eighteen, 6.4% from eighteen to twenty-four, 29.8% from twenty-five to forty-four, 26.2% from forty-five to sixty-four, and 14.1% who were sixty-five years of age or older. The median age was forty years.

For every one hundred females, there were 102.9 males. For every one hundred females who were aged eighteen or older, there were 95.9 males.

The median income for a household in the township was $40,051, and the median income for a family was $43,636. Males had a median income of $32,500 compared with that of $23,512 for females. The per capita income for the township was $16,641.

Approximately 9.5% of families and 11.2% of the population were living below the poverty line, including 13.8% of those who were under the age of eighteen and 12.6% of those who were aged sixty-five or older.

== Sport ==
=== Former Auto Racing at Brynfan Tyddyn ===
From 1952 to 1956, the Brynfan Tyddyn Road Races took place on a 3.5-mile (5.6 km) road course, lapped clockwise, using Schoolhouse Road, Church Road, Outlet Road (Outlet-Loyalville Road), and Bear Holow Road. It had a start-finish line on Schoolhouse Road. The course had a more than 344 feet (105 metres) change in elevation. It was used for sports car racing. The course was situated between Bear Hollow Creek and Harveys Creek.

The races were coupled with the Giants Despair Hillclimb less than 20 miles away at Laurel Run. Organizer of the races was the Philadelphia & Northeast Pennsylvania Regions SCCA.

==== Champions ====
- July 26, 1952: The Main Road Race was won by Phil Walters with a Porsche 356 America.
- The former president of the Road Racing Drivers Club, Dolph Vilardi, won the 1953 Road Race for Class F (Porsche and MG Mk II), Class G, and Class H - Modified on a PBX Special.
- The 1955 Road Race for Class E - Production and Class F - Production was won by Lake Underwood with a Porsche 356 Speedster.
- July 25, 1956: The Road Race for Class E - Modified and F - Modified Cars was won by Carroll Shelby with a Ferrari 500 TR.

== Gallery ==
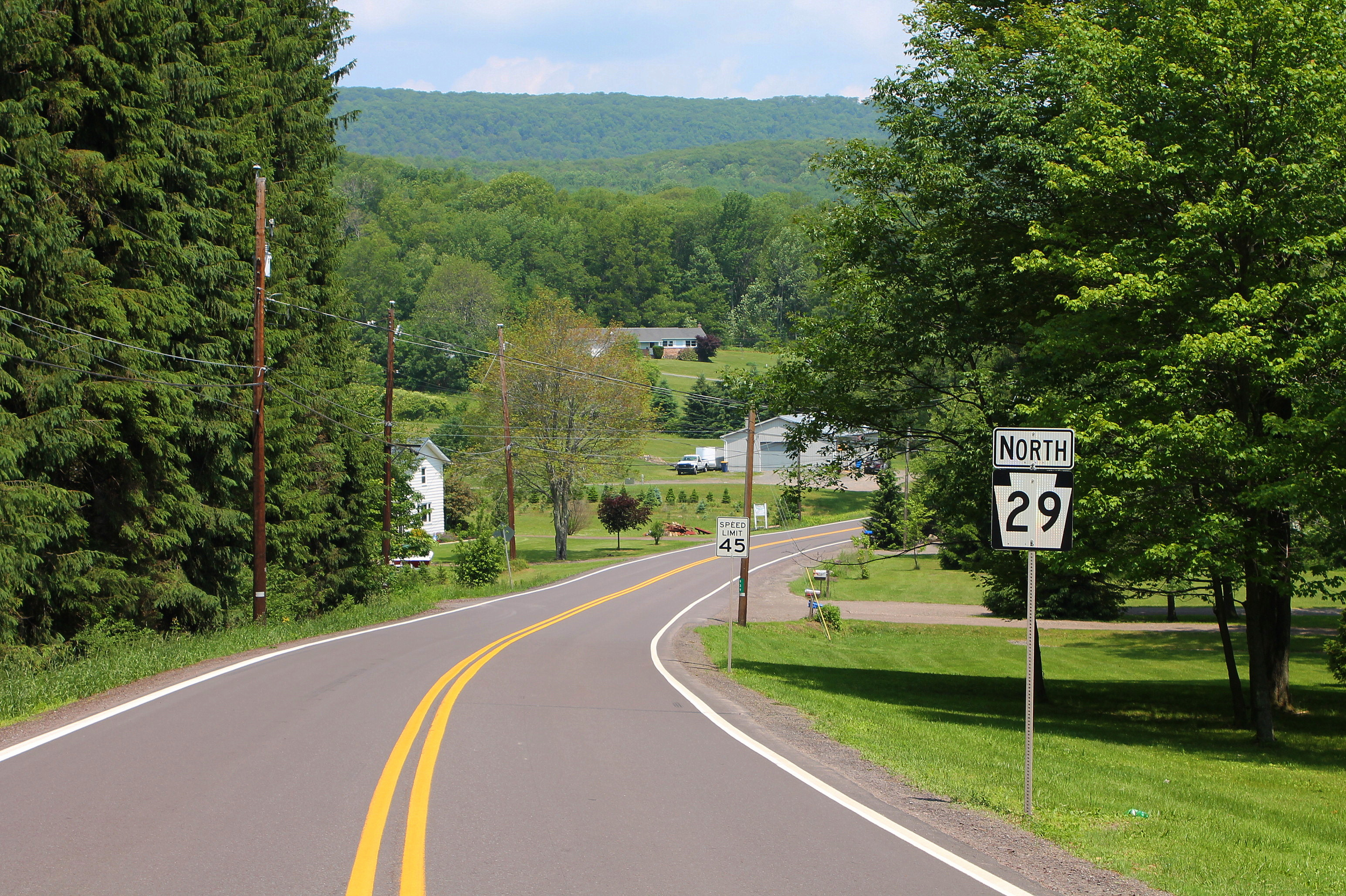
PA Route 29 in Lake Township

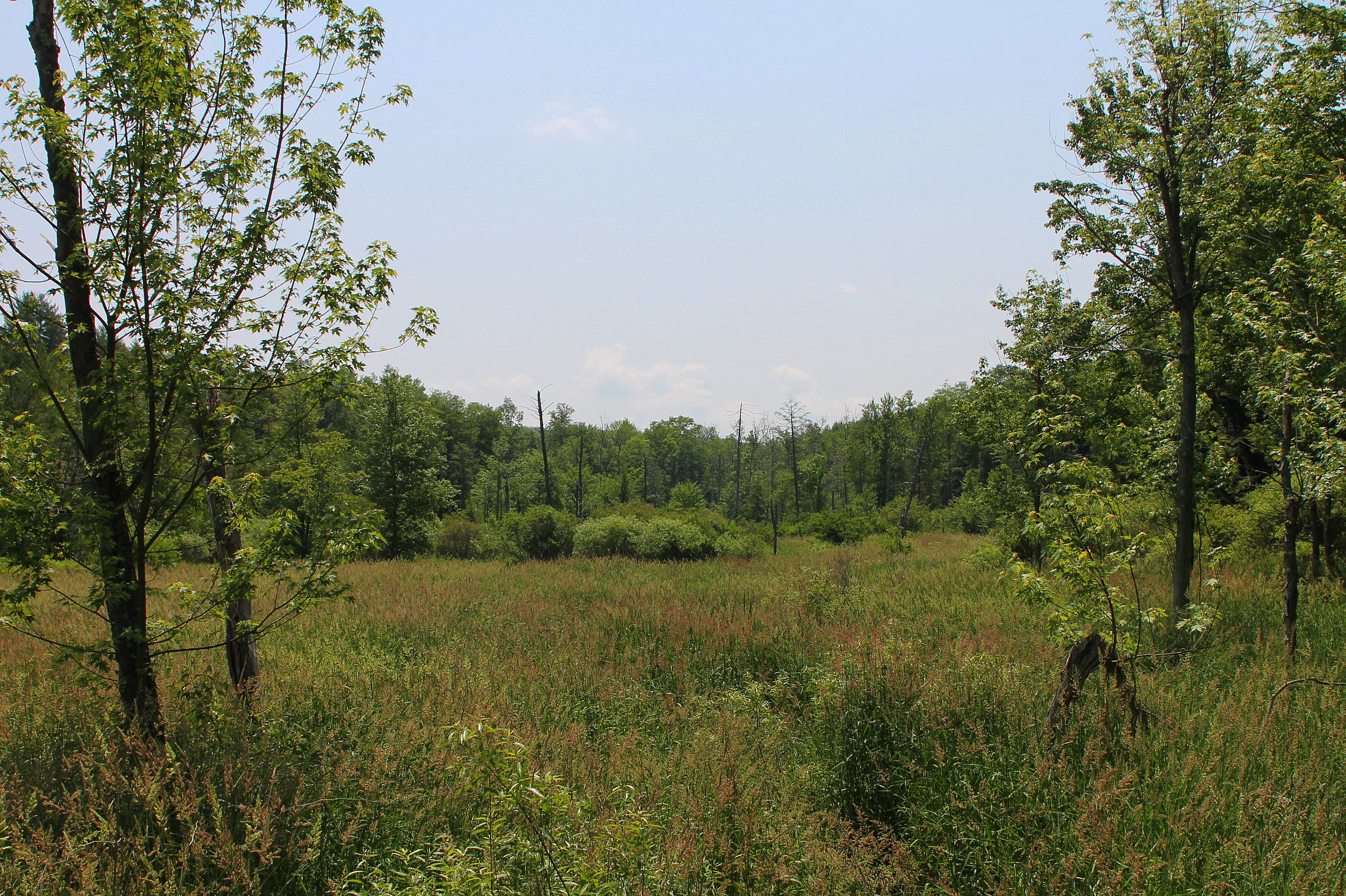

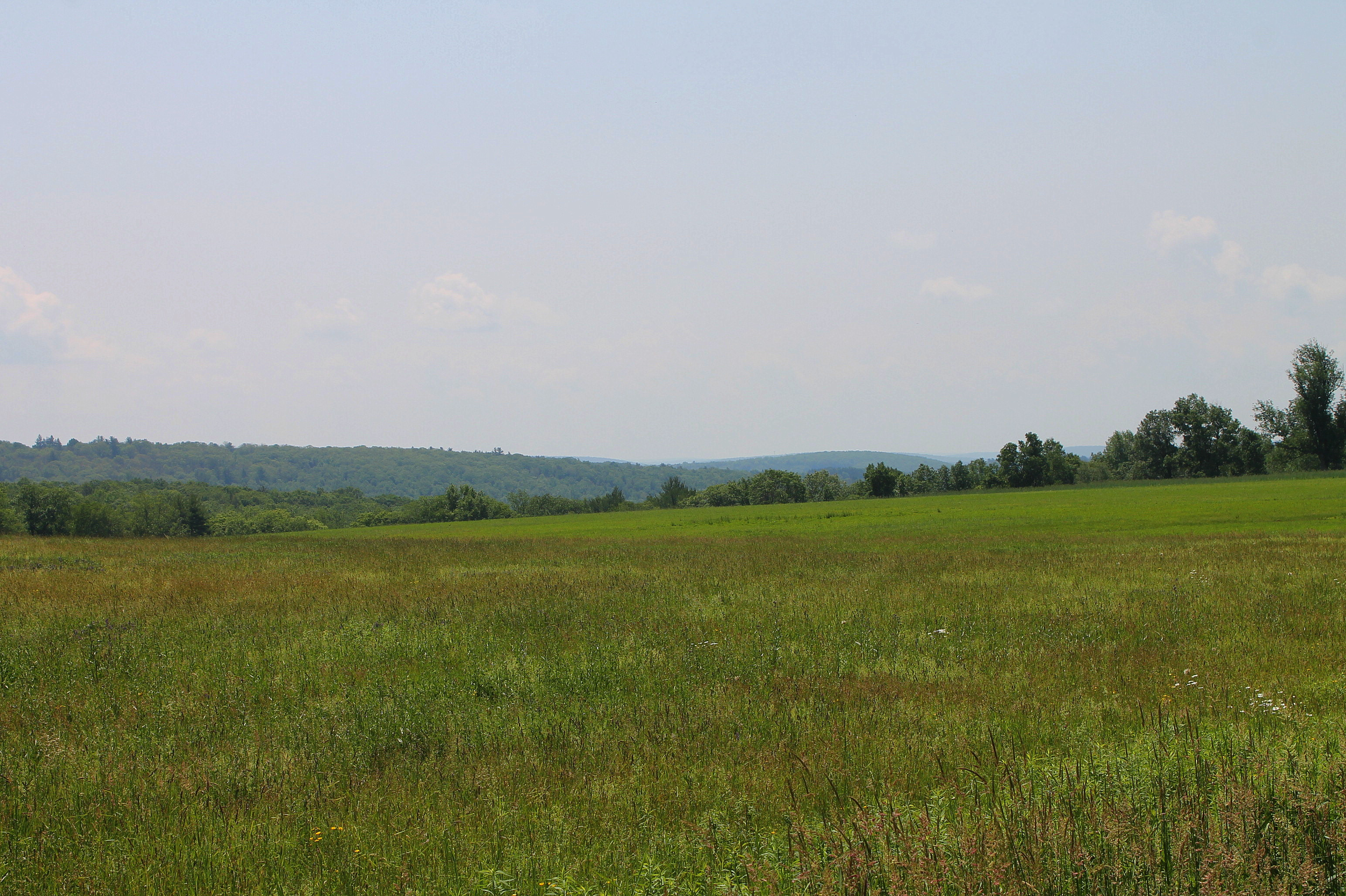
