= Great Valley (Pennsylvania) =

Valley in southeastern Pennsylvania, US

Coordinates: 40.05860°N 75.53062°W

The north hills of the Great Valley in West Whiteland Township

The Great Valley, also referred to as the Chester Valley, is a geographic valley located in the southeastern portion of the U.S. state of Pennsylvania. Located within the larger Delaware Valley region (but extending into the Susquehanna River drainage basin), the valley begins at the Schuylkill River in Montgomery County and runs southwesterly through the entirety of Chester County, eventually ending in Lancaster County.

This Great Valley is near and parallel to, but distinct from, the Great Appalachian Valley.

== Location ==
The exact borders of the Great Valley are not precisely defined, however, based on topographic maps, the valley appears to begin inside Upper Merion Township in Montgomery County. The northern hills begin in Valley Forge National Historical Park, while the valley's southern hills begin further east in Gulph Mills. The valley runs west through the center of Chester County in Tredyffrin Township, East Whiteland Township, West Whiteland Township, East Caln Township, Downingtown, and Caln Township. The valley begins to narrow as it runs through Valley Township, Coatesville, Sadsbury Township, Parkesburg, West Sadsbury Township, and Atglen. The valley then crosses into Lancaster County, where the hills immediately begin to fade out in Sadsbury Township.

Signage for "Great Valley" on U.S. Route 202

While the valley spans several communities, the "Great Valley area" has typically referred to East Whiteland Township, whose motto is "The Heart of Great Valley". Several businesses and organizations within the township utilize the name "Great Valley", examples including the Great Valley Corporate Center, Great Valley School District, Great Valley High School, and Penn State Great Valley. "Great Valley" is also signed as a control city for the US 202 exit to PA 29, which leads to the area around the unincorporated community of Devault in the township.

== Geography ==
The Great Valley lies within the Piedmont plateau region, and is officially classified as Piedmont Lowlands in Pennsylvania geology.

Multiple branches of both the Brandywine and Octoraro creeks cross the valley. Valley Creek flows along the base of eastern Great Valley, towards the Schuylkill River. A second creek, also named Valley Creek, flows westward from Frazer into the East Branch Brandywine Creek. Beaver Creek flows eastward along the northern side of the valley from around Thorndale into the East Branch Brandywine Creek.

Limestone and dolomite are present under the base soil throughout the valley, especially within the Valley Creek basin. This has made the area popular for quarry operations, but has also made sinkholes and other karst features frequent.

== Communities ==
All communities are located in Chester County unless otherwise noted.

=== City ===
- Coatesville

=== Boroughs ===
- Atglen
- Downingtown
- Parkesburg

=== Townships ===
- Caln
- East Caln
- East Whiteland
- Sadsbury
- Sadsbury (Lancaster)
- West Sadsbury
- West Whiteland
- Tredyffrin
- Upper Merion (Montgomery)

=== Census-designated places ===
Census-designated places are unincorporated communities designated by the U.S. Census Bureau for the purposes of compiling demographic data. They are not actual jurisdictions under Pennsylvania law.

- Caln
- Chesterbrook
- Exton
- Frazer
- King of Prussia (Montgomery)
- Pomeroy
- Thorndale
- Westwood

=== Other unincorporated communities ===
- Devault
- Glenloch

== Transportation ==
Historically, the Great Valley has created a natural westward route from the Philadelphia area to Pennsylvania Dutch Country.

The Reading Company formerly operated the Chester Valley Branch, a line that ran through the valley from Downingtown to Bridgeport. The Chester Valley Railroad also operated on the line. After both railroads ceased operations, the right of way was eventually acquired by Conrail and later abandoned. Most of the line has since been revitalized into a rail trail known as the Chester Valley Trail, which currently runs through the valley from Exton to Bridgeport. There are future plans in place to extend the trail all the way to the western end of the valley in Atglen.

The Pennsylvania Railroad's Main Line formerly ran through the valley, running from the western end of the valley in Atglen and heading east before exiting in East Whiteland Township. Today, the same line is used as part of Amtrak's Keystone Service, which runs from Philadelphia to Harrisburg, and by SEPTA's Paoli/Thorndale Line, running from Philadelphia to Thorndale.

Both the Pennsylvania Turnpike and U.S. Route 202 parallel each other through the eastern portion of the valley. The Pennsylvania Turnpike enters the valley from the northern hills in Devault and continues east until it reaches the valley's eastern end at the Schuylkill River. US 202 enters the valley through the southern hills in Glenloch and similarly runs east through the valley to the Schuylkill River. U.S. Route 30 and its auxiliary, U.S. Route 30 Business, run east–west through the valley as well. US 30 mainline enters from the north near Thorndale and runs east before leaving the valley in East Whiteland Township and heading south. US 30 Business enters the valley from the north in Coatesville and runs parallel to US 30 to Glenloch, where its designation ends. The historic Lincoln Highway, concurrent with the Philadelphia and Lancaster Turnpike in the area, follows US 30 Business from Coatesville to Glenloch, then along US 30 from Glenloch to East Whiteland Township. Pennsylvania Route 372 serves as the main east–west highway for the far western portion of the valley, running from Atglen east to Coatesville.

Highways that run north–south through the valley include: PA 41 in Atglen, PA 10 in Parkesburg, PA 82 in Coatesville, PA 340 in Caln Township, US 322, PA 282, and PA 113 in Downingtown, PA 100 in West Whiteland Township, PA 401, PA 352, and PA 29 in East Whiteland Township, PA 252 in Tredyffrin Township, and US 422, I-76, PA 23, and PA 320 in Upper Merion Township.
