= Great Valley =

Great Valley may refer to:

== Places ==
- Central Valley (California), or Great Valley, or Great Central Valley, that runs through the center of California.
- The Great Appalachian Valley extending from Canada to Alabama
- Great Valley, New York, a town in Cattaraugus County, New York, USA

=== Pennsylvania ===
- Great Valley (Pennsylvania)
- Great Valley School District
  - Great Valley High School
- Great Valley Corporate Center

== See also ==
- Great Rift Valley, Kenya, a major rift valley
- Great Rift Valley (geographical concept), a series of connected rifts in SW Asia and East Africa
- Great Valley Sequence, a group of geologic formations in the Central Valley of California
- A fictional fertile place of refuge for dinosaurs in the film The Land Before Time
- Great Valley Products, a computer hardware supplier
