= Pennsylvania Route 29 =

State highway in Pennsylvania, US

Pennsylvania Route 29
- Map of eastern Pennsylvania with PA Route 29 highlighted in red

Route information
- Maintained by PennDOT
- Length: 118.239 mi (190.287 km)
- Existed: 1928–present

Southern section
- Length: 43.454 mi (69.932 km)
- South end: US 30 near Malvern
- Major intersections: US 202 near Malvern; I-76 Toll / Penna Turnpike in Devault; PA 23 in Phoenixville; US 422 near Mont Clare; PA 113 in Rahns; PA 73 in Schwenksville; PA 63 in Green Lane; PA 663 in Pennsburg; PA 100 from Hereford to Shimerville
- North end: I-78 / PA 309 near Allentown

Northern section
- Length: 74.785 mi (120.355 km)
- South end: I-81 in Ashley
- Major intersections: US 11 near Nanticoke; PA 118 in Lake Township; PA 415 in Noxen Township; PA 309 in Monroe Township; PA 292 in Eaton Township; US 6 in Tunkhannock; US 6 Bus. in Tunkhannock; PA 167 / PA 706 in Montrose
- North end: NY 7 near Brookdale

Location
- Country: United States
- State: Pennsylvania
- Counties: Chester, Montgomery, Berks, Lehigh; Luzerne, Wyoming, Susquehanna

Highway system
- Pennsylvania State Route System; Interstate; US; State; Scenic; Legislative
← PA 28	→ US 30
← PA 138	→ US 140

Pennsylvania Route 29 (PA 29) is a 118-mile-long (190 km) north–south state highway that runs through most of eastern Pennsylvania.

The route currently has a southern and northern segment. The southern segment runs from U.S. Route 30 (US 30) near Malvern north to Interstate 78 (I-78)/PA 309 near Allentown. The northern segment runs from I-81 in Ashley north to the New York state line near Brookdale, Pennsylvania, where the road becomes New York State Route 7 (NY 7). The southernmost 5 miles (8.0 km) of PA 29's northern segment is a freeway known as the South Cross Valley Expressway. The route was continuous until May 9, 1966, when PA 29 was split into the two segments that exist today.

== Route description ==
=== Southern section ===
==== Chester County ====
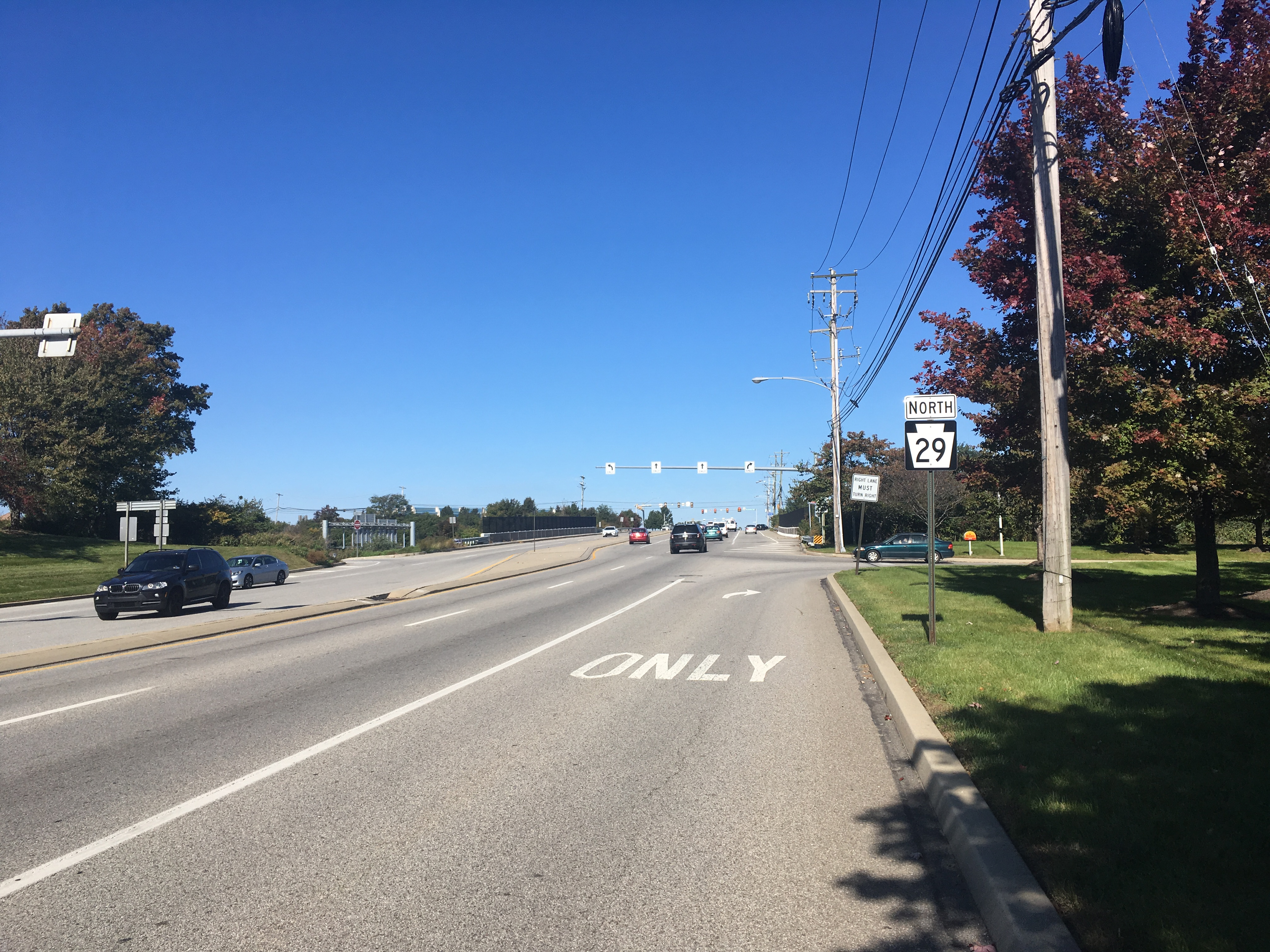
PA 29 northbound at US 202 interchange in East Whiteland Township

The southern section of PA 29 begins at an intersection with US 30 (Lancaster Avenue) near Malvern in East Whiteland Township, Chester County, heading north on six-lane divided South Morehall Road. The road passes businesses, office parks, and a shopping center, curving northwest and crossing the Chester Valley Trail as it narrows to four lanes. The road comes to an intersection with Matthews Road, which provides access to and from US 202 northbound. Just before the road crosses a bridge over the US 202 freeway, an entrance ramp from US 202 south intersects with PA 29 south. The route passes to the west of the Penn State Great Valley university campus as it reaches the Swedesford Road intersection, which provides access to remaining movements to and from US 202. Following the intersection, the route becomes North Morehall Road, heading to the west of Great Valley Corporate Center. PA 29 runs through wooded areas, crossing Valley Creek before curving north and passing through more of the Great Valley Corporate Center. The road runs between a quarry to the west and a lake and residential development to the east before it comes to a ramp providing access to the Pennsylvania Turnpike (I-76). Past here, the route becomes undivided near more commercial development, crossing into Charlestown Township and then curving northwest, passing under the Pennsylvania Turnpike, and crossing an abandoned railroad line before entering Devault.

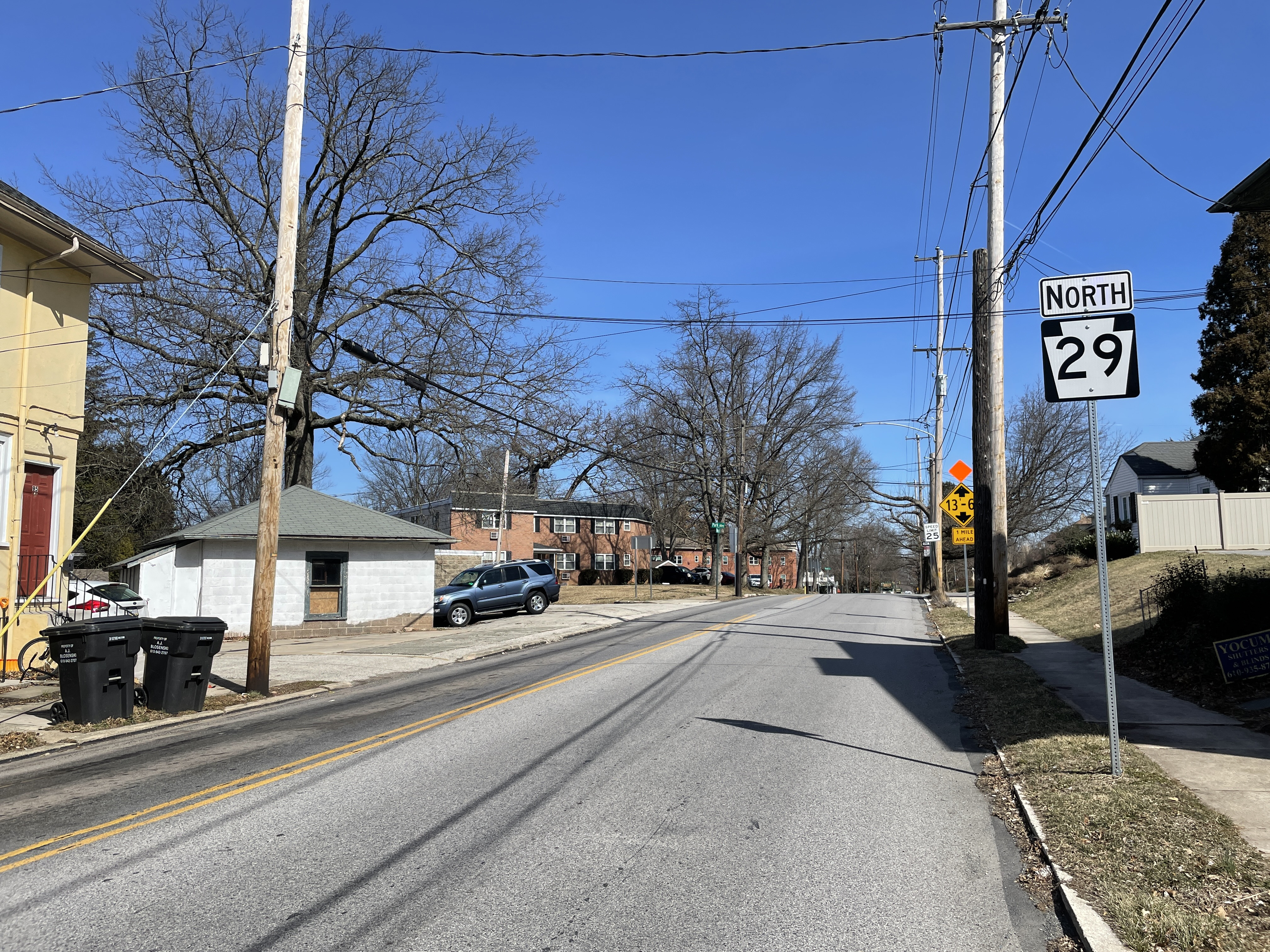
PA 29 northbound past PA 23 in Phoenixville

At this point, PA 29 turns north onto a two-lane undivided State Road and runs through wooded areas with the abandoned railroad parallel to the east. The road curves northwest and passes to the west of a quarry before continuing through forests. The route turns north and passes through Aldham before it makes a curve to the northeast and crosses Pickering Creek. PA 29 passes under the abandoned railroad line and enters Schuylkill Township, heading through a mix of woods and fields with some homes parallel to the creek. The road turns east and then northeast, heading away from Pickering Creek and continuing into suburban residential development. The route becomes the border between Phoenixville to the northwest and Schuylkill Township to the southeast before fully entering Phoenixville as Main Street, passing homes. PA 29 heads to the east of Phoenixville Hospital before it comes to an intersection with PA 23, at which point Main Street splits to the north and PA 29 continues northeast along Manavon Street. The route continues through residential areas, turning north onto Starr Street. PA 29 heads north into the commercial downtown of Phoenixville, where it turns east onto Bridge Street. The route continues east and is joined by the Schuylkill River Trail from the west, passing under Norfolk Southern's Harrisburg Line north of the former Phoenixville station before it comes to the Mont Clare Bridge over the Schuylkill River.

==== Montgomery County ====
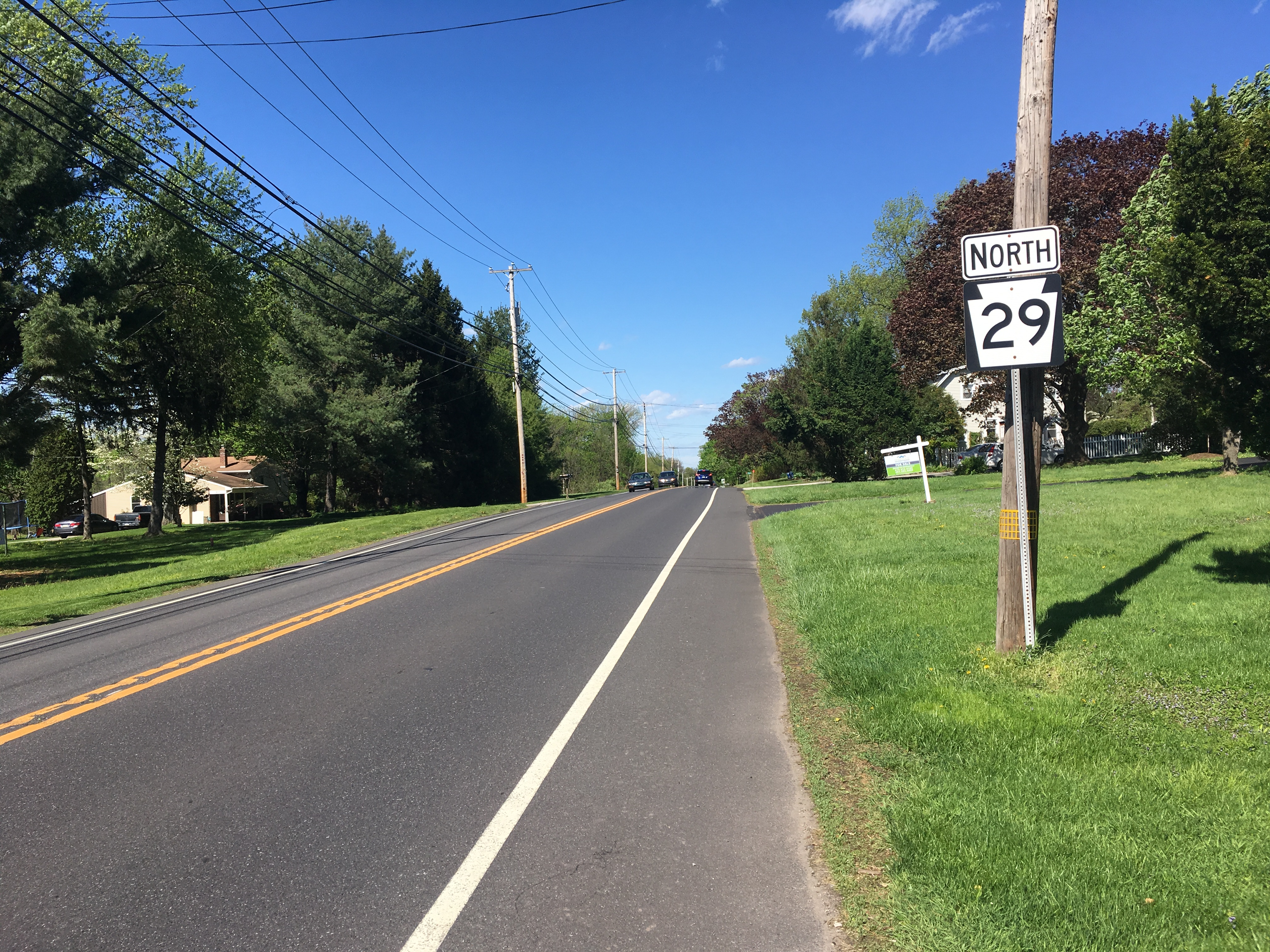
PA 29 northbound in Upper Providence Township

Upon crossing the Schuylkill River, PA 29 enters Upper Providence Township in Montgomery County and heads northeast as Phoenixville-Collegeville Road, crossing the Schuylkill River Trail, which splits to the east, and heading into Mont Clare. The road runs past a mix of homes and businesses, passing under an abandoned railroad line. The route continues through residential areas before heading into a mix of fields and woods with some homes. PA 29 passes a golf course and residential developments as it becomes South Collegeville Road, heading near business parks and widening to four lanes. The road becomes a divided highway and comes to an interchange with the US 422 freeway. Past this interchange, the route becomes a six-lane divided highway and runs between the Providence Town Center shopping center to the northwest and office parks to the southeast. PA 29 narrows to a two-lane undivided road and passes to the southeast of residential development, heading through Yerkes. The road runs through wooded areas before it heads near businesses and enters Collegeville, where it gains a second northbound lane and becomes 2nd Avenue. The route curves east and crosses the Perkiomen Trail before heading past a shopping center to the north and homes to the south. The road narrows to two lanes and turns north, heading past more businesses and widening to a four-lane divided highway as it comes to an intersection with East Main Street. Here, PA 29 crosses East Main Street and curves northeast before it heads north along two-lane undivided 1st Avenue, running along the west bank of the Perkiomen Creek. The road runs near some commercial development before it continues through wooded areas between the Perkiomen Trail to the west and the creek to the east, crossing the trail again.

The route leaves Collegeville for Perkiomen Township and becomes Gravel Pike, running through wooded areas with some residential development to the west of the Perkiomen Trail and the Perkiomen Creek. In Rahns, PA 29 comes to an intersection with PA 113. Past this junction, the road runs through more woodland with some residential and commercial development west of the creek, passing east of Perkiomen Valley High School and heading through Graterford. The route continues north alongside Perkiomen Creek and bends northwest, coming to an intersection with PA 73. At this point, PA 29 begins a concurrency with PA 73 and the two routes head into Schwenskville on Main Street, heading past homes and businesses and curving to the north. Farther north, the road becomes the border between Schwenksville to the west and Lower Frederick Township to the east, running between wooded neighborhoods to the west and the Perkiomen Creek and Perkiomen Trail to the east. The two routes cross Swamp Creek to fully enter Lower Frederick Township and become Gravel Pike, running through wooded areas with some homes. In Zieglerville, PA 73 splits from PA 29 at a roundabout by heading west.

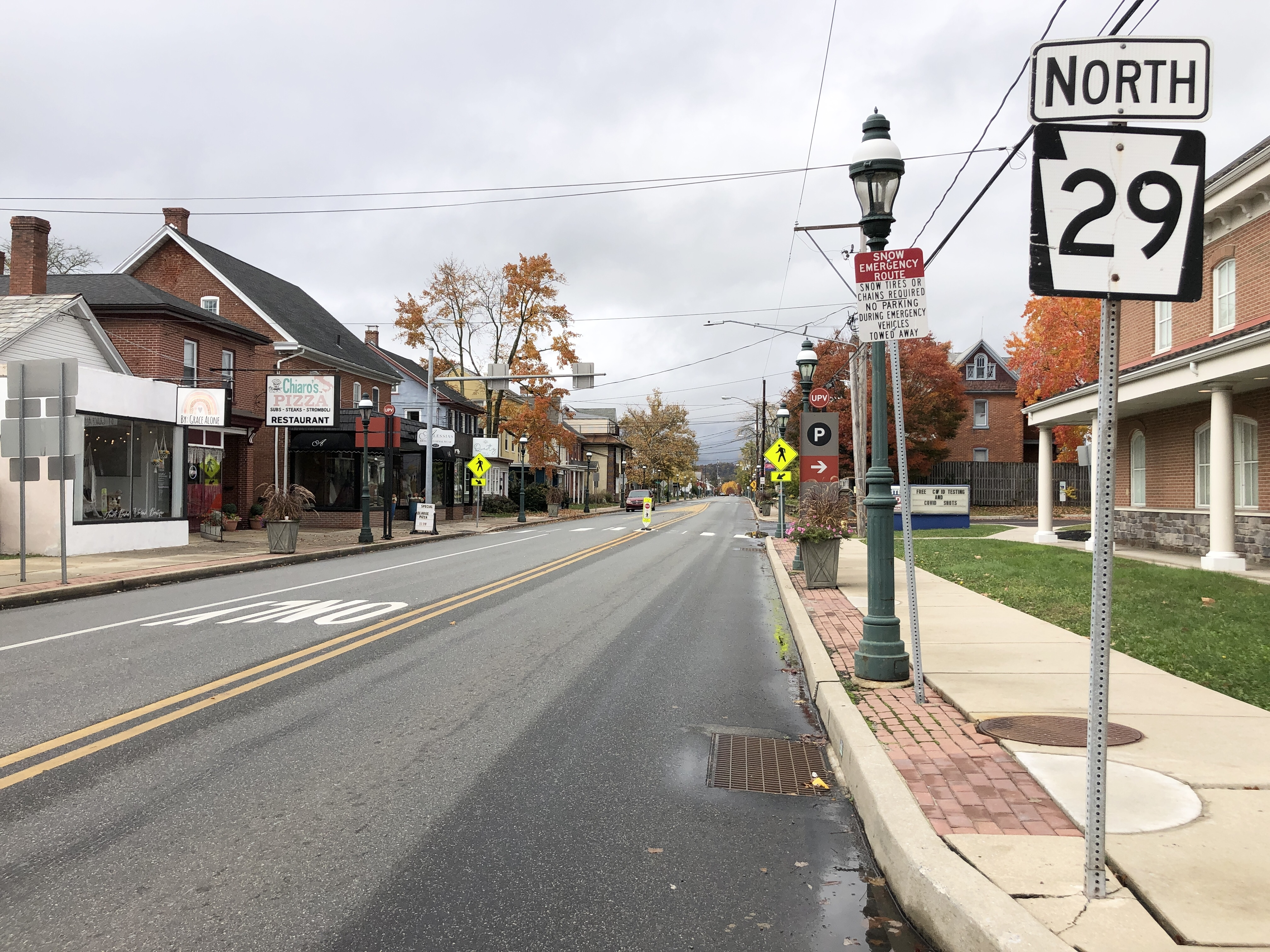
PA 29 northbound past PA 663 in Pennsburg

From here, PA 29 continues north along Gravel Pike through a mix of farmland and woodland with a few homes and businesses. Farther north, the road enters Upper Frederick Township and runs through wooded areas with some fields and homes. The route curves northeast and crosses the Perkiomen Creek into Marlborough Township, where it passes through Perkiomenville and crosses the Perkiomen Trail again. PA 29 curves northwest and heads through forests between the east bank of the creek and the retired Reading Railroad's Perkiomen Branch right-of-way. The road makes a turn to the east and passes to the south of Knight Lake within Green Lane Park, heading into Green Lane. Here, the route turns north and runs past a mix of homes and businesses, coming to an intersection with the western terminus of PA 63. Past this intersection, PA 29 bends to the northwest past more development before it turns west and runs through wooded areas on the border between Marlborough Township to the north and Green Lane to the south. The road turns north and fully enters Marlborough Township, heading through wooded areas with some homes to the east of Green Lane Reservoir and northern sections of Green Lane Park.

The route heads into a mix of farmland and woodland with some homes and enters Upper Hanover Township. Farther north, PA 29 crosses into Red Hill and becomes Main Street, lined with homes. The road continues past residences with a few businesses and bends to the north-northwest. The route enters Pennsburg and runs past more homes and commercial development. PA 29 reaches the commercial center of Pennsburg, where it comes to an intersection with PA 663. Past this intersection, the road runs past homes and a few businesses, continuing into East Greenville. In East Greenville, the route continues through residential areas. PA 29 leaves East Greenville for Upper Hanover Township and becomes Gravel Pike, passing between a shopping center to the southwest and farmland to the northeast. The road continues northwest through a mix of farm fields and residences, with industrial areas to the southwest. The route heads into forested areas with some development and passes under an East Penn Railroad line. PA 29 runs to the north of Perkiomen Creek before it runs past homes and a few businesses in Palm. The road continues northwest into farmland with some homes.

==== Berks and Lehigh counties ====
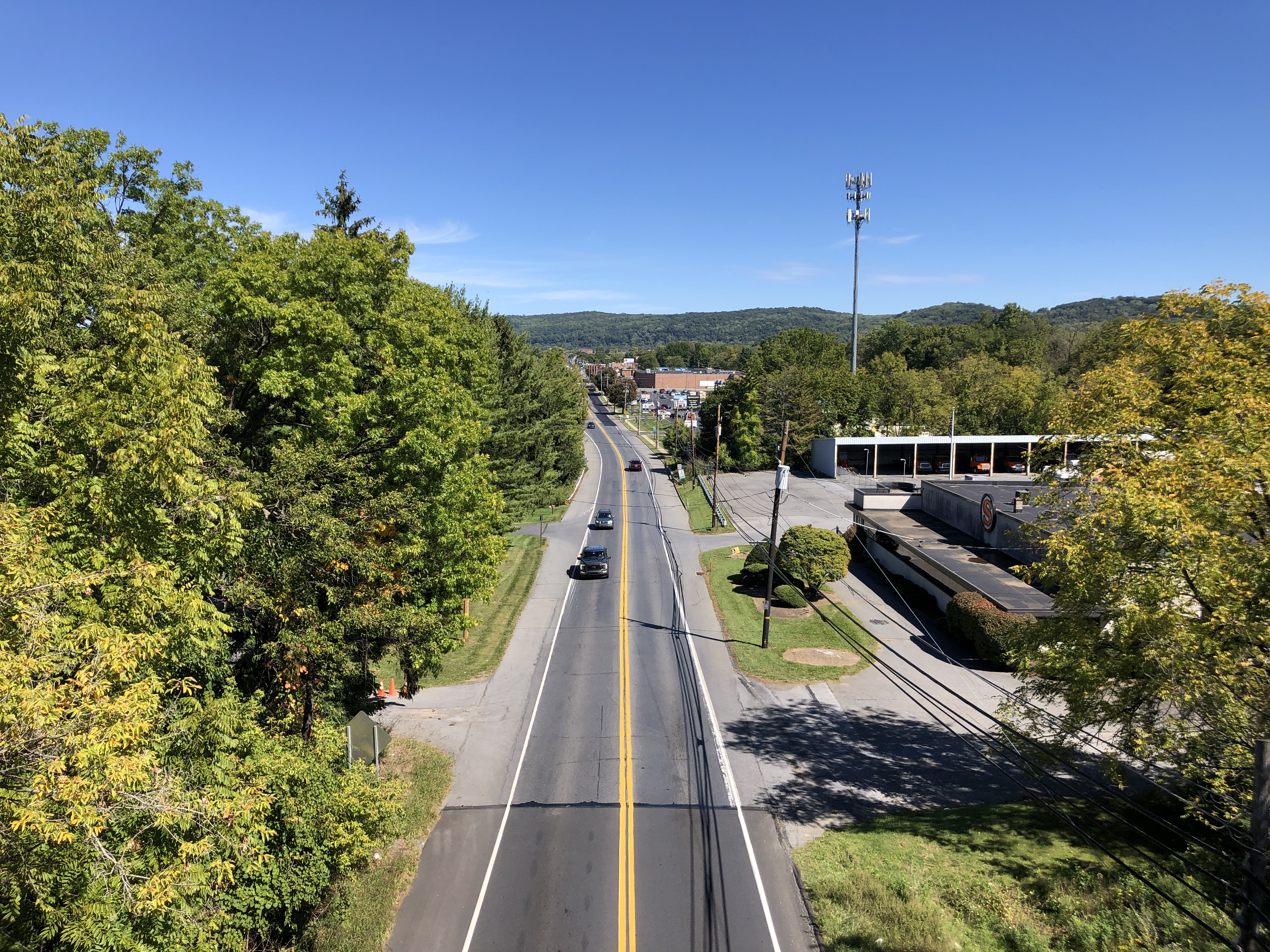
PA 29 northbound in Emmaus

PA 29 enters Hereford Township in Berks County and runs past homes with some farms and woods in Chapel, curving to the north. The road runs through agricultural areas with some development and turns northwest, coming to an intersection with PA 100 in Hereford Township. At this point, PA 29 turns north for a concurrency with PA 100 on Chestnut Street, and the two routes head north into woodland with some fields and residences.

PA 29/PA 100 crosses into Upper Milford Township in Lehigh County, which is in the Lehigh Valley, curving northeast through wooded areas with some farmland and development in the South Mountain range. The road turns north near Old Zionsville before it passes through Shimerville. PA 100 splits from PA 29 by turning northwest onto North Kings Highway, with PA 100 Truck heading north along PA 29.

Past PA 100, PA 29/PA 100 Truck continue along Chestnut Street through wooded areas with some residential and commercial development. The road curves northeast and heads near homes, with PA 100 Truck splitting to the west to follow Buckeye Road. PA 29 continues past commercial development before it comes to a bridge over Norfolk Southern's Reading Line and curves to the east-northeast near homes and businesses. The road passes under the Pennsylvania Turnpike Northeast Extension, also known as I-476, and passes into Emmaus, where the highway is lined with businesses. PA 29 veers northwest onto Cedar Crest Boulevard, where its passes through residential areas southwest of Emmaus High School, and then heads through a section of Upper Milford Township prior to becoming the border between Lower Macungie Township to the west and Emmaus to the east and curving to the north.

The road then fully enters Lower Macungie Township and crosses Little Lehigh Creek, passing through a mix of fields, woods, and homes and running to the west of Lehigh Country Club. PA 29 crosses into Salisbury Township and widens into a four-lane road that passes between Lehigh Valley Hospital–Cedar Crest to the west and an office park to the east. The route becomes a divided highway and comes to an interchange with I-78/PA 309, where the southern section of PA 29 ends and Cedar Crest Boulevard becomes SR 1019, continuing north toward Allentown.

=== Northern section ===
==== Luzerne County ====
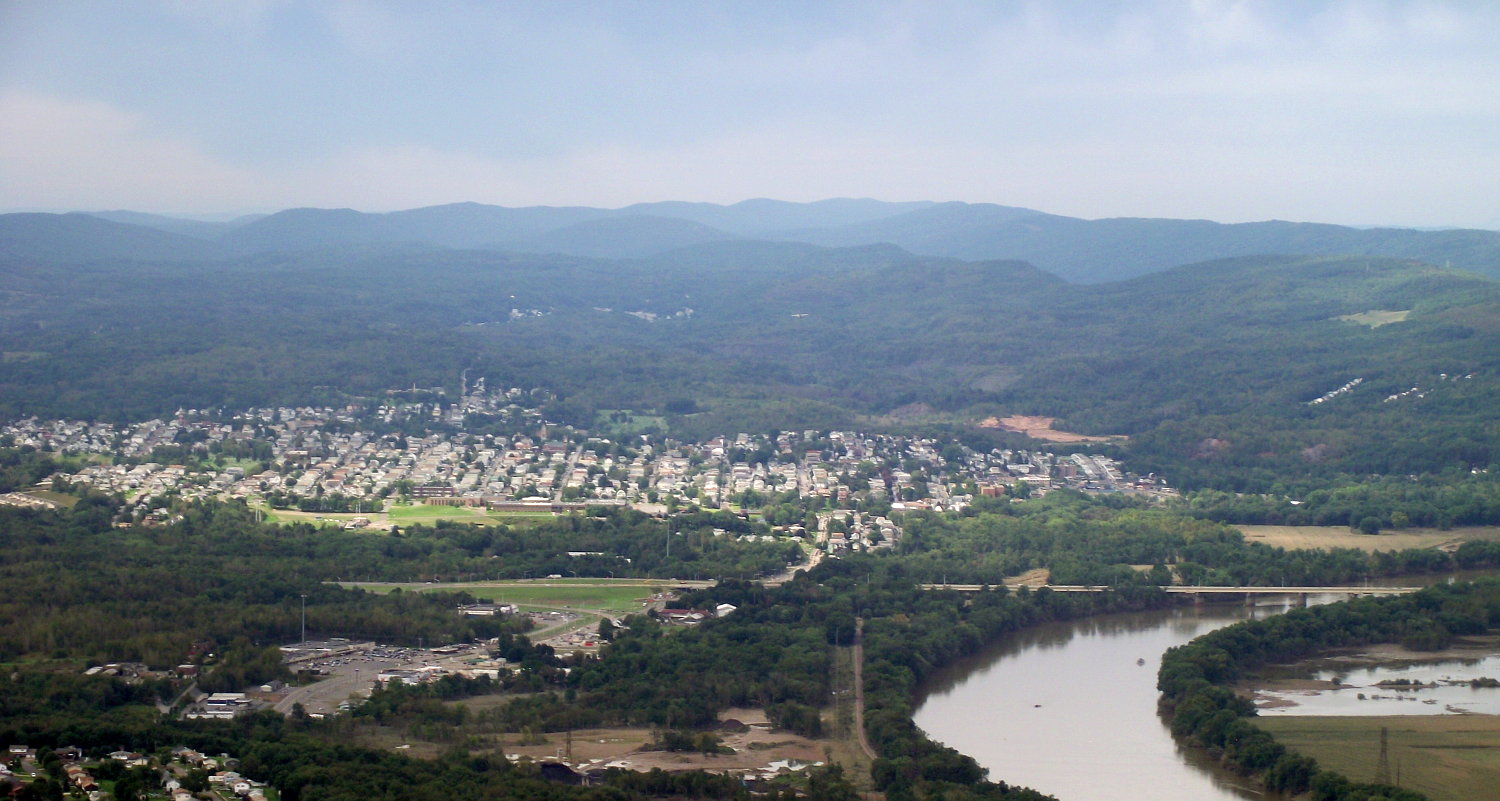
PA 29 crossing the Susquehanna River at Nanticoke

The northern section of PA 29 begins at a trumpet interchange with I-81 south of Ashley in Hanover Township, Luzerne County, heading west on the South Cross Valley Expressway, a four-lane freeway. The route passes through wooded areas with some nearby development, coming to an interchange with Main Street that provides access to Ashley to the northeast and Sugar Notch to the southwest. Following this interchange, the freeway heads through a corner of Sugar Notch before crossing back into Hanover Township and passing near several warehouses and some homes. PA 29 reaches a diamond interchange with South Main Street that serves Wilkes-Barre to the northeast and Alden to the southwest. The route bends west-southwest into wooded areas, curving to the northeast as it heads east of Nanticoke.

The freeway comes to an interchange with Sans Souci Parkway, which heads west to Nanticoke and northeast to Wilkes-Barre. Following this, PA 29 passes over Norfolk Southern's Sunbury Line before it comes to a bridge over the Susquehanna River, at which point it crosses into Plymouth Township. Here, the route comes to the end of the South Cross Valley Expressway at a trumpet interchange with a two-way road carrying the northbound direction of US 11; the southbound direction of US 11 bypasses the interchange to the north.

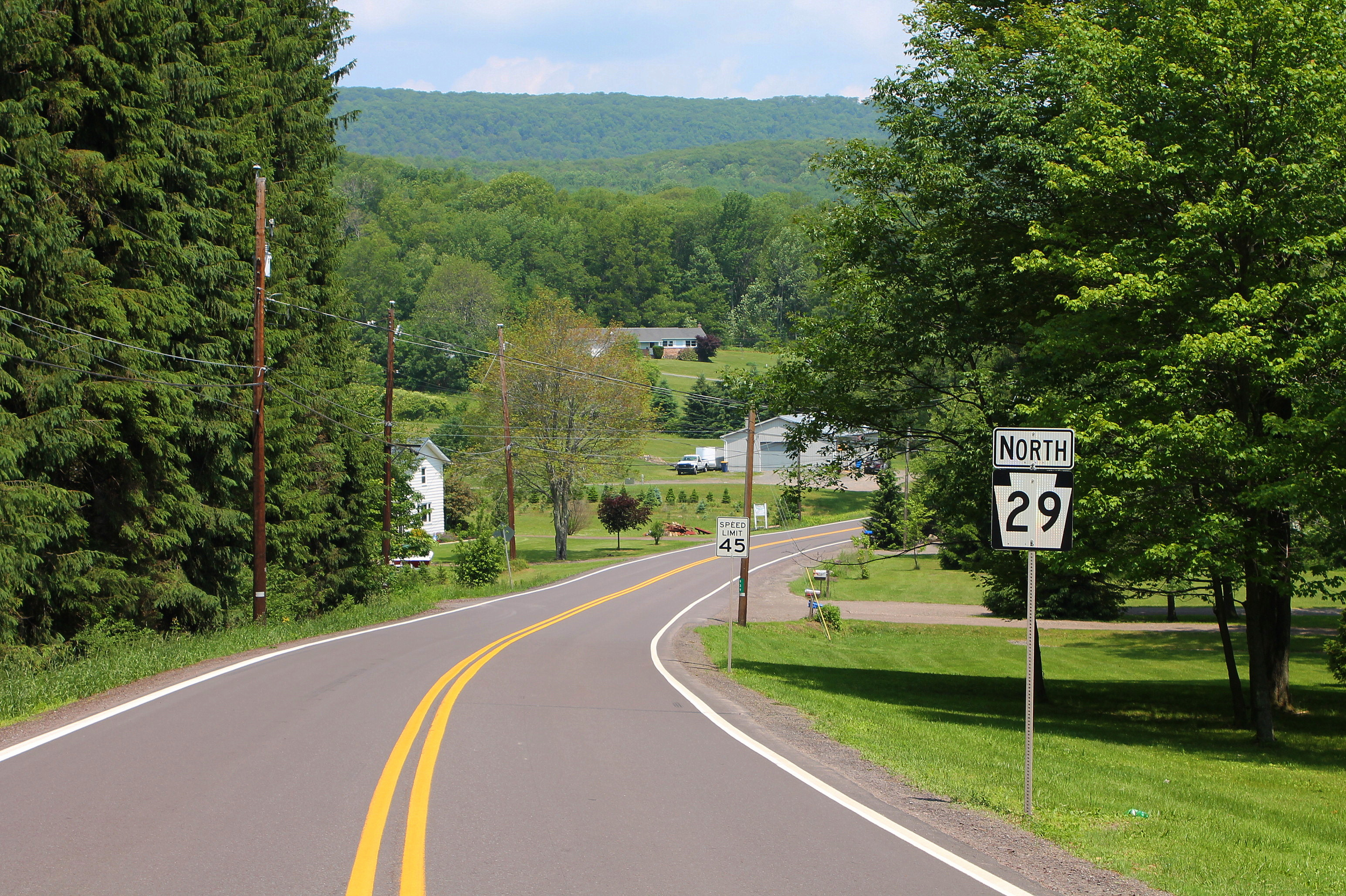
PA 29 northbound in Lake Township, Luzerne County

At this point, PA 29 heads west concurrent with the northbound direction of US 11 on a divided highway with one northbound lane and two southbound lanes, heading through wooded areas to the north of the Susquehanna River. The southbound direction of US 11 merges in and US 11/PA 29 continue west as two-lane undivided East Poplar Street through woods before heading past homes and businesses in West Nanticoke, gaining a center left-turn lane. The name changes to Allen Street before the roadway curves northwest. The road crosses Harveys Creek before PA 29 splits from US 11 by turning north-northeast onto two-lane South Mill Street, running past more development to the west of the creek. The route becomes North Mill Street before it leaves West Nanticoke and becomes an unnamed road, winding northeast through a section of the Pinchot State Forest, alongside Harveys Creek and between Shickshinny Mountain to the west and Larksville Mountain to the east. The road crosses to the east side of the creek and winds north through more forest, crossing into Jackson Township. At this point, the route enters the Back Mountain region of Luzerne County. PA 29 curves to the northwest and leaves the state forest, passing through Ceasetown and heading west through more forested land. The road crosses Harveys Creek and heads to the south of Pikes Creek Reservoir, where it passes through a small corner of Plymouth Township before entering Lehman Township. The route continues through wooded areas with some homes before it curves northwest and runs through Silkworth, where it passes southwest of Lake Silkworth. PA 29 turns to the north and runs through more forests with some fields and comes, crossing into Lake Township and coming to an intersection with PA 118 in Pikes Creek. Past this intersection, the road runs through more woodland with some fields and homes, turning to the west. The route makes a sharp curve to the north and runs through more rural land with some development, winding to the northeast and passing through Ruggles Corners as it runs to the southeast of North Mountain.

==== Wyoming County ====
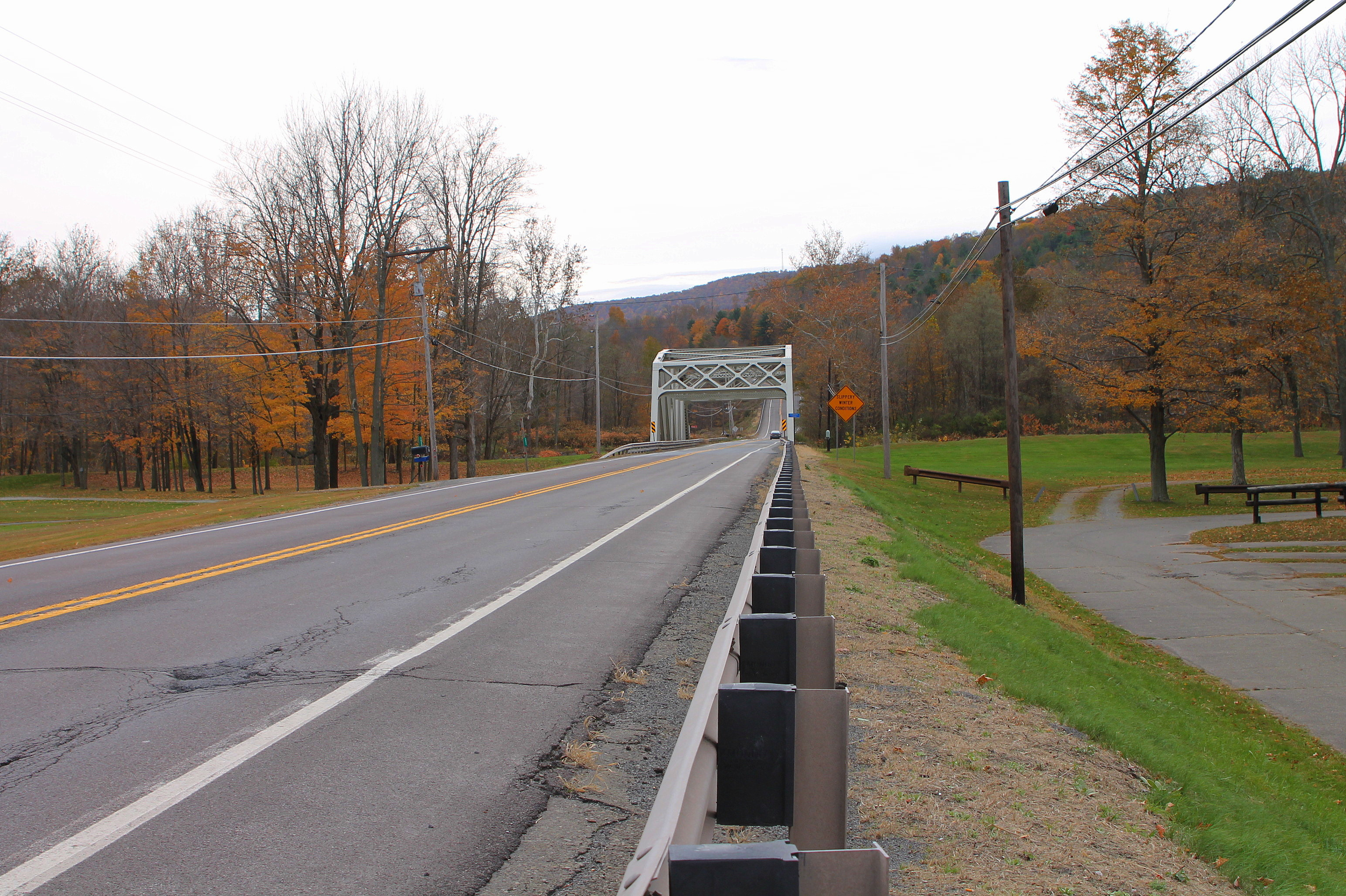
PA 29 southbound in Eaton Township, Wyoming County

PA 29 enters Noxen Township in Wyoming County and continues northeast through a mix of fields and woods with some homes, coming to an intersection with the northern terminus of PA 415 in Ruggles Corners. Here, the route turns northwest and runs through forests with some homes, curving to the north. The road bends northeast and then east, heading into Noxen. Here, PA 29 curves north and turns east, continuing past homes. The route crosses Bowman Creek and heads into farmland with some homes, entering Monroe Township and bending to the northeast. The road passes over the creek again and continues to Bowman Creek, where it curves north and reaches an intersection with the northern terminus of PA 309. At this point, PA 29 heads northwest and crosses Bowman Creek, running through forested areas with a few homes to the west of the creek. The route curves northeast and continues alongside Bowman Creek, passing through Evans Falls. The road runs through forests with some fields and homes, entering Eaton Township and reaching a junction with the western terminus of PA 292. Following this, PA 29 continues through rural land, turning north and briefly becoming a four-lane divided highway. The route becomes a two-lane undivided road again and crosses Bowman Creek on a truss bridge, passing to the east of Seneca Trail County Park. The road continues north-northeast through a mix of farms and woods east of the creek, passing through Rosengrant and turning to the northeast. PA 29 crosses Bowman Creek again and continues through rural areas with some development, turning to the north. The route gains a center left-turn lane and becomes Hunter Highway, passing businesses as it heads to the west of Skyhaven Airport. Farther north, the road loses the center turn lane.

PA 29 crosses the Susquehanna River into Tunkhannock and becomes Bridge Street, crossing the Reading Blue Mountain and Northern Railroad's Susquehanna Branch line and coming to an intersection with US 6. From here, the route runs past businesses and reaches a junction with US 6 Bus. in the commercial downtown of Tunkhannock. The road continues north-northeast through residential areas with a few businesses. PA 29 leaves Tunkhannock for Tunkhannock Township and becomes an unnamed road, heading north through a mix of farmland and woodland with some residences and commercial development. The road continues through wooded areas with some fields and homes, passing to the west of Lake Carey and heading into Lemon Township. The route heads to the east of Stevens Lake and runs through farms and woods, passing through Lemon. The road passes through more rural land and crosses Meshoppen Creek before running to the west of Avery.

==== Susquehanna County ====
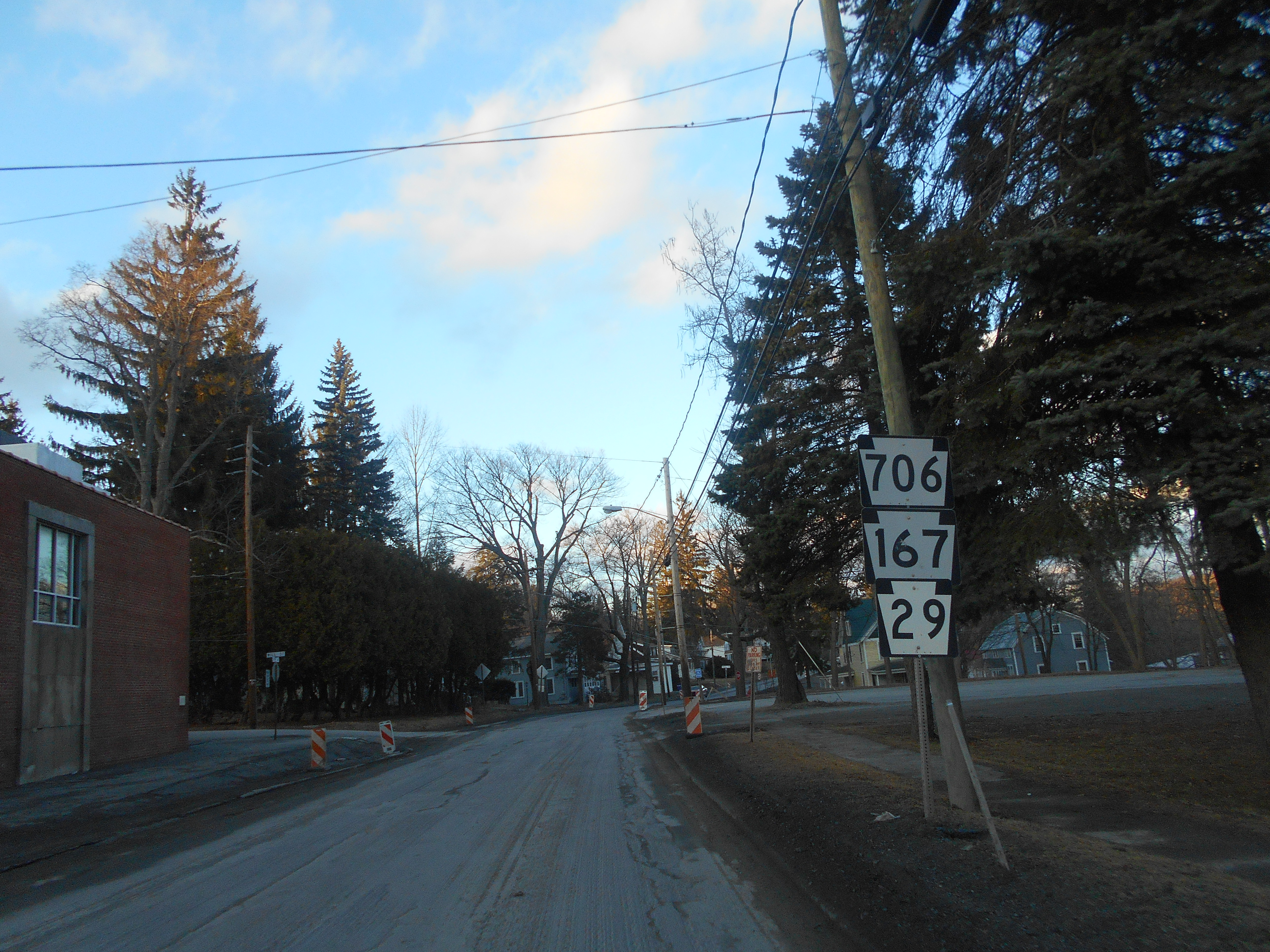
PA 29 northbound concurrent with PA 167 and PA 706 in Montrose

PA 29 continues into Springville Township in Susquehanna County and heads north-northeast through a mix of farmland and woodland with some homes, passing through Springville. The road continues through rural land with some natural gas wells and crosses into Dimock Township, passing through Tyler. The route runs through farmland with some woods, homes, and natural gas wells and turns to the north, heading through Dimock. PA 29 runs through a mix of fields and woods with some development, entering Bridgewater Township. The road passes to the west of Husky Haven Airport and runs past homes and businesses in South Montrose. The route continues north-northeast through rural areas before it bends northeast and then northwest as it runs through woodland with some nearby homes. PA 29 enters Montrose and becomes South Main Street, running through residential areas. The route curves northeast and runs past businesses before reaching an intersection with PA 167/PA 706 in the downtown area of Montrose. Here, PA 29 turns southeast to join PA 167/PA 706 on Church Street. The road passes more homes, turning northeast and becoming Grow Avenue. The three routes head into commercial areas and crosses back into Bridgewater Township, becoming an unnamed road.

PA 29 splits from PA 167/PA 706 by heading north on an unnamed road, passing to the west of Lake Montrose. The road continues through a mix of farmland and woodland with some homes, crossing into Franklin Township and bending to the north-northeast. The route winds north through more rural areas and becomes parallel to Snake Creek, which is to the east of the road. PA 29 runs through wooded areas with some fields and residences, passing through Franklin Forks. The road continues north and enters Liberty Township, where it becomes Snake Creek Road and bends north-northeast, running through Lawsville Center. The route runs through forests with some farm fields and residences to the west of Snake Creek and heads through Brookdale. The northern section of PA 29 reaches its northern terminus at the New York state line, where the road continues into that state as NY 7.

== History ==
=== Original route ===
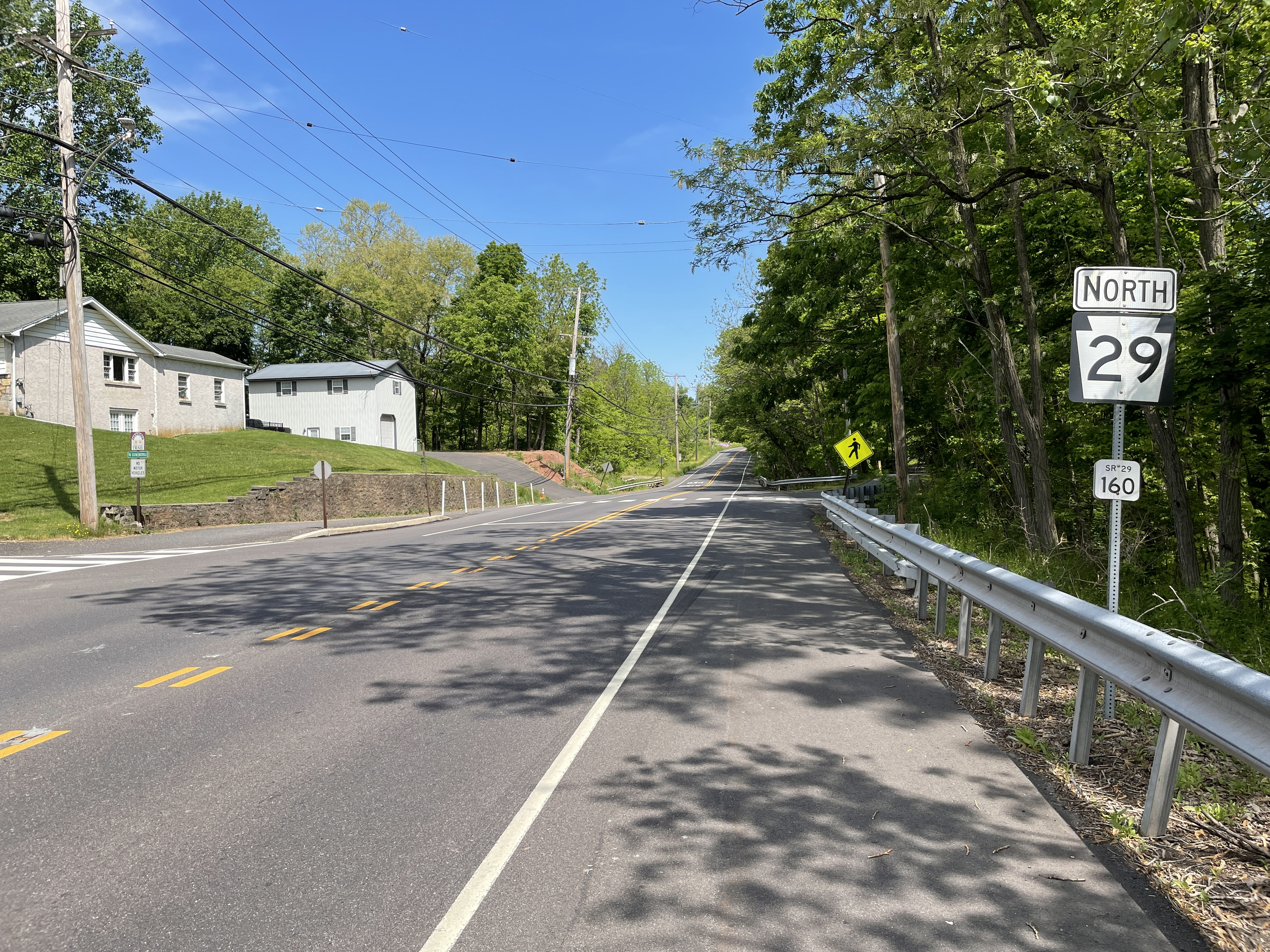
PA 29 northbound in Collegeville

PA 29 was created and first signed in 1928. During this time, construction began on the segment between Tunkhannock north to Springville. The following year, in 1929, the stretch between Tunkhannock and Lemon, midway Tunkhannock and Springville, opened to traffic. Lemon to Springville opened the following year, in 1930.

In 1934, work started on the section between US 6 in Tunkhannock and Franklin Forks, located midway between Montrose and the state border. The construction was complete by the following year. In 1936, two major sections of the route, stretching between Evans Falls to Rosengrants, near Tunkhannock, and from Franklin Forks to the state line, were paved. A subsequent project united PA 29 into a single route, completing the road from Hazleton to Tunkhannock. PA 29 and PA 113 switched alignments between Phoenixville and Rahns in 1937, with PA 29 now following its present alignment between those two places. Two years later, the section from Rosengrants to Tunkhannock was paved. In 1940, the section between Bowmans Creek and Evans Falls was paved.

In 1946, the route underwent its first realignment when PA 29 was routed to its current position between West Nanticoke and Silkworth, shifting the route from Cragle Hill Road and Swamp Road to US 11 from Shickshinny to West Nanticoke. This routing replaced Pennsylvania Route 139. The route was split on May 9, 1966, by eliminating the section between US 309 in Allentown and US 11 in West Nanticoke, removing a number of overlaps that linked the two segments. The former alignment of PA 29 became solely US 309 (now PA 309) between Allentown and Schnecksville, newly-designated PA 873 between Schnecksville and Lehigh Gap, newly-designated PA 248 between Lehigh Gap and Weissport, solely US 209 between Weissport and Nesquehoning, an extension of PA 93 between Nesquehoning and Nescopeck, an extension of PA 239 between Nescopeck and Shickshinny, and solely US 11 between Shickshinny and West Nanticoke.

=== Post-split ===
In 1969, construction began on the South Cross Valley Expressway between Sugar Notch and the Nanticoke interchange. The expressway was extended to I-81 in 1971 and opened in 1972.

Prior to construction of the US 202 expressway in 1970, PA 29 travelled entirely on Phoenixville Pike between Phoenixville and West Chester. PA 29 entered West Chester on Goshen Road and Marshall Street, ending at PA 100 (High Street) in the borough. When the US 202 expressway was built, PA 29 was rerouted onto Morehall Road in Devault and ran south to junction US 202 and then end at US 30.

In 1978, PA 29 was re-signed to the northern segment of the route after 12 years of not having a designation. The southern terminus was moved from West Nanticoke to the current end at I-81 exit 164 in Ashley. Plans to extend the South Cross Valley Expressway were announced in 2009 but have not yet commenced.

In 1991, the interchange with US 202 was reconstructed in order to relieve growing congestion on PA 29 due to the presence of the nearby Great Valley Corporate Center. Seven new ramps were constructed on Swedesford Road and Matthews Road, which both run parallel to US 202, while the existing diamond interchange that directly connected PA 29 with US 202 was removed with the exception of one ramp. The project ultimately provided two ramps for each movement between PA 29 and US 202, while also reducing the number of left turns needed to move between the two routes.

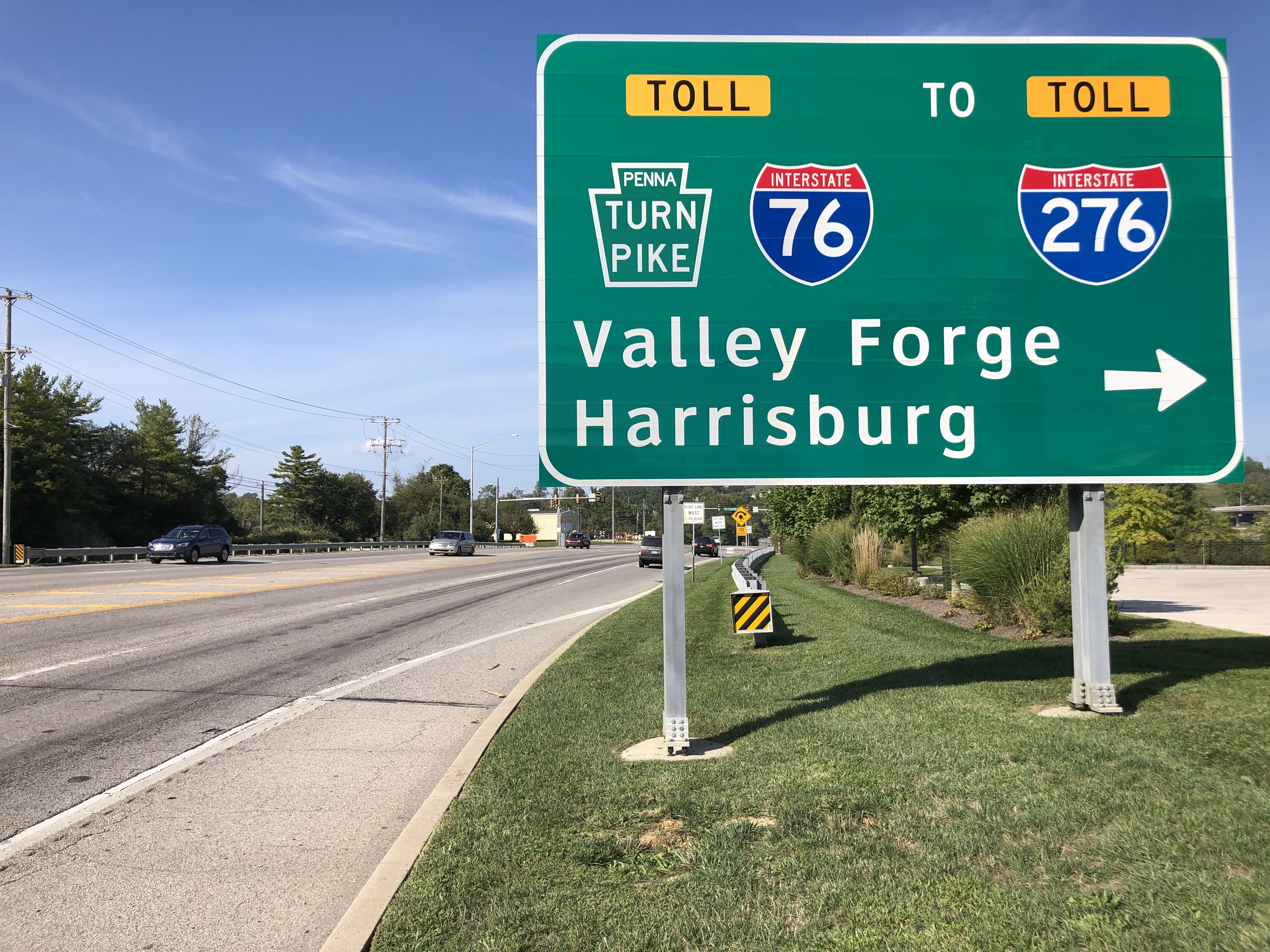
PA 29 at the interchange with the Pennsylvania Turnpike, which was completed in 2012

In 1996, plans were made by the Pennsylvania Turnpike Commission (PTC) to construct slip ramps connecting the Pennsylvania Turnpike to PA 29 near Devault. Construction of the ramps were seen as necessary in order to provide a turnpike connection to the nearby Great Valley Corporate Center, along with traffic relief to the area of suburban Chester County that lies within the 14-mile stretch of the turnpike between the Downingtown and Valley Forge interchanges. The ramps would use electronic toll collection instead of traditional toll booths, and so it would be only accessible for E-ZPass tagholders. The slip ramps initially faced opposition from local residents, as they voiced concern as to the potential implications a turnpike connection would have on traffic in the area. Funding for the PA 29 slip ramp was approved in 2002, but due to environmental concerns, design issues, and continued opposition, construction did not begin until March 2011. The interchange officially opened to the public on December 11, 2012, as exit 320 on the turnpike. Following the turnpike's switch to toll-by-plate electronic toll collection in 2020, the interchange is no longer E-ZPass only, and is now open to non-E-ZPass tagholders.

In 2009, a roundabout was constructed at the intersection of PA 29 and PA 73 in Lower Frederick Township, which resulted in a decrease in crashes at the junction following its opening.

In November 2020, the intersection between PA 29 and East Main Street in Collegeville was realigned to allow for drivers continuing on PA 29 to directly cross through the intersection. Before, drivers on PA 29 had to briefly use East Main Street for about 200 feet (61 m) to continue on the route.

== Major intersections ==
County	Location	mi	km	Exit	Destinations	Notes
Chester	East Whiteland Township	0.000	0.000		US 30 (Lancaster Pike) – Malvern, Immaculata University, Exton	Southern terminus
Chester	East Whiteland Township	0.422	0.679		Matthews Road to US 202 north – King of Prussia	
Chester	East Whiteland Township	0.513	0.826		US 202 north	Interchange; southbound entrance only
Chester	East Whiteland Township	0.656	1.056		Swedesford Road to US 202 – West Chester, King of Prussia	
Chester	East Whiteland Township	1.984	3.193		I-76 Toll / Penna Turnpike to I-276 Toll east – Valley Forge, Harrisburg	Exit 320 on I-76 / Penna Turnpike
Chester	Phoenixville	6.717	10.810		PA 23 (Nutt Road) – Pottstown, Valley Forge	
Schuylkill River		7.693	12.381	Mont Clare Bridge		
Montgomery	Upper Providence Township	10.112– 10.128	16.274– 16.299		US 422 – Pottstown, King of Prussia	Interchange
Montgomery	Perkiomen Township	14.342	23.081		PA 113 – Trappe, Skippack	
Montgomery	Schwenksville	17.333	27.895		PA 73 east (Skippack Pike) – Skippack	Southern end of PA 73 concurrency
Montgomery	Lower Frederick Township	19.584	31.517		PA 73 west – Obelisk	Roundabout; northern end of PA 73 concurrency
Montgomery	Green Lane	24.342	39.175		PA 63 east (Main Street) – Harleysville	Western terminus of PA 63
Montgomery	Pennsburg	28.918	46.539		PA 663 (Pottstown Avenue) to I-476 Toll – Pottstown, Quakertown	
Berks	Hereford Township	33.761	54.333		PA 100 south (Chestnut Street) – Boyertown	Southern end of PA 100 concurrency
Lehigh	Upper Milford Township	37.833	60.886		PA 100 north – Fogelsville PA 100 Truck begins	Northern end of PA 100 concurrency; southern terminus of PA 100 Truck
Lehigh	Upper Milford Township	39.376	63.370		PA 100 Truck north (Buckeye Road) – Macungie	Northern end of PA 100 Truck concurrency
Lehigh	Salisbury Township	43.454	69.932		I-78 / PA 309 – Harrisburg, Tamaqua, Bethlehem, Quakertown	Northern terminus; exit 55 on I-78
Gap in route
Luzerne	Hanover Township	0.000	0.000	Southern end of freeway section		
Luzerne	Hanover Township	0.000	0.000		I-81 – Wilkes-Barre, Hazleton	Southern terminus; exit 164 on I-81
Luzerne	Sugar Notch	0.642	1.033	1	Sugar Notch, Ashley	Access via Main Street
Luzerne	Hanover Township	1.999	3.217	2	Wilkes-Barre, Alden	Access via South Valley Parkway; signed as exits 2A (Wilkes-Barre) and 2B (Alden) northbound
Luzerne	Hanover Township	4.131	6.648	3	Nanticoke, Wilkes-Barre	Access via Sans Souci Parkway; access to Luzerne County Community College
Luzerne	Plymouth Township	4.866	7.831		US 11 north – Plymouth	Southern end of US 11 concurrency
Luzerne	Plymouth Township	4.866	7.831	Northern end of freeway section		
Luzerne	Plymouth Township	6.396	10.293		US 11 south	Northern end of US 11 concurrency
Luzerne	Lake Township	16.947	27.274		PA 118 – Williamsport, Dallas	
Wyoming	Noxen Township	24.844	39.983		PA 415 south – Harveys Lake, Dallas	Northern terminus of PA 415
Wyoming	Monroe Township	30.511	49.103		PA 309 south – Dallas, Wilkes-Barre	Northern terminus of PA 309
Wyoming	Eaton Township	34.111	54.896		PA 292 east – Vernon, Centermoreland	Western terminus of PA 292
Wyoming	Tunkhannock	39.982	64.345		US 6 – Towanda, Scranton	
Wyoming	Tunkhannock	40.104	64.541		US 6 Bus. (Tioga Street)	
Susquehanna	Montrose	61.505	98.983		PA 167 north / PA 706 west (Church Street) – Wyalusing	Southern end of PA 167/PA 706 concurrency
Susquehanna	Bridgewater Township	62.691	100.891		PA 167 south / PA 706 east – New Milford, Scranton	Northern end of PA 167/PA 706 concurrency
Susquehanna	Liberty Township	74.785	120.355		NY 7 north	Continuation into New York
1.000 mi = 1.609 km; 1.000 km = 0.621 mi: Concurrency terminus; Electronic toll collection

== PA 29 Truck ==
=== Montgomery County ===
Pennsylvania Route 29 Truck
- Location: Upper Providence Township

Pennsylvania Route 29 Truck signs are used to direct motorists from Egypt Road at the US 422 interchange to PA 29 in Upper Providence Township in Montgomery County. Trucks are not allowed to make the sharp right turn from westbound Egypt Road to northbound PA 29 and must use Black Rock Road to access PA 29 north. Trucks heading to southbound PA 29 may access it from Egypt Road.

=== Lehigh County ===
Pennsylvania Route 29 Truck
- Location: Lehigh County
- Length: 11.2 mi (18.0 km)

Pennsylvania Route 29 Truck is a truck route around a weight-restricted bridge over Norfolk Southern's Reading Line in Upper Milford Township in Lehigh County, on which trucks over 30 tons and combination loads over 40 tons are prohibited. The route follows Buckeye Road and Chestnut Street (running concurrent with PA 100 Truck), PA 100, Weilers Road, Hamilton Boulevard, and Lower Macungie Road. It was signed in 2013.
