= Chester Valley Trail =

Rail trail in Pennsylvania, United States

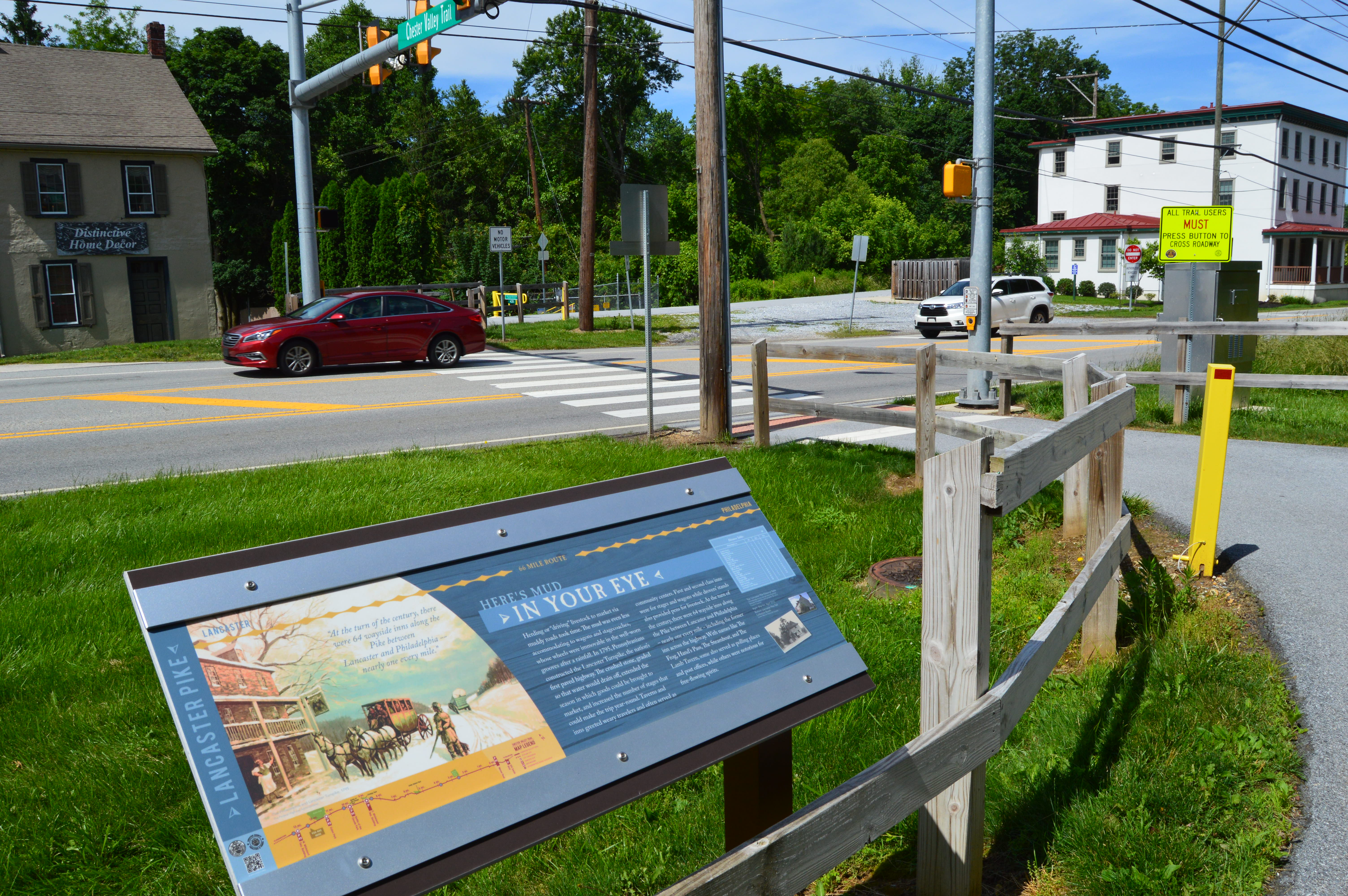
- View of trail near Exton, Pennsylvania
- Length: 19 mi (31 km)
- Established: 2000
- Trailheads: Exton, Pennsylvania; Norristown, Pennsylvania
- Use: Multi-use, non-motorized
- Season: Variable, depending on latitude
- Sights: Valley Forge National Historic Park; Battle of the Clouds Park; Valley Creek Park

The Chester Valley Trail (CVT) is a 19-mile (31 km) rail trail which runs largely through the Great Valley of Pennsylvania (also known as the Chester Valley) in Chester and Montgomery counties in southeastern Pennsylvania. The west end is in Exton (Chester County), while the east end is in Norristown (Montgomery County). Phase 1 of the trail was funded by the American Recovery and Reinvestment Act of 2009. Phase 2 of the trail's construction was completed in March 2023, adding 7.6 miles (12.2 km).

== Historical development ==
The Chester Valley Trail enjoys a rich history closely connected to a number of American Revolutionary War parks and monuments. The trail runs through Battle of the Clouds Park, a site known for a battle between the armies of General Washington and General Cornwallis in September 1777 in which torrential downpour spoiled the colonial troops' black powder and forced them to retreat prior to fully engaging the British. Additionally, the trail travels within a few miles of the site of the Paoli massacre.

Phase 2 of the trail project connected the trail to the Schuylkill River Trail, providing a link to Valley Forge National Historic Park. It opened in March 2023.

Part of the trail near King of Prussia

== Trail construction ==
The Chester Valley Trail idea began in 1991 when Conrail abandoned the former Reading Company Chester Valley Branch, whose route connected the towns of Bridgeport and Downingtown. As there were two parallel railway lines within a mile from the route (built by competitor the Pennsylvania Railroad), Conrail considered the Chester Valley Branch redundant and had abandoned most of the route by 1991. A 2-mile (3.2 km) remnant of the branch (from Bridgeport to King of Prussia) survived until May 2011 when short line operator East Penn Railroad abandoned it; this stretch will be incorporated into Phase 2.

Authorities from Chester and Montgomery counties, in conjunction with the Pennsylvania Department of Transportation (PennDOT) looked to convert the road bed into a walking trail. In 2009, PennDOT hired C. Abbonizio Contractors to construct Phase 1 of the trail for $3.2 million. Construction on Phase 2 of the trail began in August 2021 and was completed in March 2023.

=== Design and construction ===
The paved trail is 10 to 12 feet (3.0 to 3.7 m) wide with an approximately 66-foot (20 m) wide right-of-way. The trail's unpaved section near the Great Valley Corporate Center is crushed stone. On May 27, 2010, a truss bridge was built over Church Road in East Whiteland Township. Parking and restrooms are provided at each of the trail's two trailheads. A number of parks, including the Battle of the Clouds Park and Valley Creek Park, are adjacent to the trail.
