= Springville, Pennsylvania =

Unincorporated community in Pennsylvania, US

- Unincorporated community
- Location within Pennsylvania
- Coordinates: 41°41′51″N 75°55′04″W
- Country: United States
- State: Pennsylvania
- County: Susquehanna
- Elevation: 1,152 ft (351 m)

Population
  - Estimate (2023): 232
- Time zone: UTC-5 (Eastern (EST))
  - Summer (DST): UTC-4 (EDT)
- ZIP code: 18844
- Area codes: 570 and 272
- GNIS feature ID: 1188311

Springville is an unincorporated community in Susquehanna County, Pennsylvania, United States. The community is located along Pennsylvania Route 29, 9.5 miles (15.3 km) south-southwest of Montrose. Springville has a post office with ZIP code 18844, which opened on September 19, 1815.

== Demographics ==
Historical population
Census	Pop.	Note	%±
2023 (est.)	232

The United States Census Bureau defined Springville as a census designated place (CDP) in 2023.
