= Cheryl Abplanalp =

American handball player

Personal information
- Born: June 1, 1972 (age 53) Bryn Mawr, Pennsylvania, U.S.
- Height: 1.74 m (5 ft 9 in)
- Weight: 68 kg (150 lb)

Sport
- Sport: Handball

Cheryl Abplanalp Thompson (born June 1, 1972) is an American handball player. She competed in the 1996 Summer Olympics.

== Early life and education ==
Abplanalp was born in Bryn Mawr, Pennsylvania. She played field hockey, basketball and softball at Great Valley High School in Chester County, Pennsylvania.

She was a three-sport athlete at Davis and Elkins College and co-captain of the field hockey, basketball and softball teams. She was named Davis And Elkins College Athlete of the year in 1993-94, and graduated from Davis and Elkins in 1994.

== Career ==
Abplanalp began playing team handball and became the youngest player for Team USA at the 1996 Summer Olympics in Atlanta. In 2001, she was inducted into the Davis and Elkins College Hall of Fame.

== Personal life ==
Abplanalp married John Thompson and they have a son and daughter together.
