= Dimock, Pennsylvania =

Unincorporated community in Pennsylvania, US

- Unincorporated community
- Location within Pennsylvania
- Coordinates: 41°44′47″N 75°53′54″W
- Country: United States
- State: Pennsylvania
- County: Susquehanna
- Elevation: 1,512 ft (461 m)
- Time zone: UTC-5 (Eastern (EST))
  - Summer (DST): UTC-4 (EDT)
- ZIP code: 18816
- Area codes: 272 & 570
- GNIS feature ID: 1173283

Dimock is an unincorporated community in Susquehanna County, Pennsylvania, United States. The community is located along Pennsylvania Route 29, 6.1 miles (9.8 km) south of Montrose. Dimock has a post office with ZIP code 18816, which opened on April 13, 1818.
