= Devault, Pennsylvania =

Unincorporated community in Pennsylvania, US

- Unincorporated community
- Location within Pennsylvania Location within the United States
- Coordinates: 40°4′28″N 75°32′7″W
- Country: United States
- State: Pennsylvania
- County: Chester
- Township: Charlestown
- Elevation: 344 ft (105 m)
- Time zone: UTC-5 (Eastern (EST))
  - Summer (DST): UTC-4 (EDT)
- Area codes: 610 and 484
- GNIS feature ID: 1173189

Devault is an unincorporated community in Charlestown Township in Chester County, Pennsylvania, United States. Devault is located at the intersection of Pennsylvania Route 29, Phoenixville Pike, and Charlestown Road.

== Climate ==
The climate in this area is characterized by hot, humid summers and generally mild to cool winters. According to the Köppen Climate Classification system, Devault has a humid subtropical climate, abbreviated "Cfa" on climate maps.

Climate data for Devault, Pennsylvania
Month	Jan	Feb	Mar	Apr	May	Jun	Jul	Aug	Sep	Oct	Nov	Dec	Year
Mean daily maximum °F (°C)	37 (3)	41 (5)	50 (10)	61 (16)	72 (22)	80 (27)	85 (29)	84 (29)	76 (24)	65 (18)	52 (11)	42 (6)	62 (17)
Daily mean °F (°C)	30 (−1)	33 (1)	41 (5)	51 (11)	62 (17)	70 (21)	76 (24)	74 (23)	67 (19)	56 (13)	44 (7)	35 (2)	53 (12)
Mean daily minimum °F (°C)	22 (−6)	24 (−4)	32 (0)	41 (5)	52 (11)	61 (16)	66 (19)	65 (18)	58 (14)	47 (8)	37 (3)	28 (−2)	44 (7)
Average precipitation inches (mm)	3.8 (97)	2.8 (71)	3.5 (89)	3.6 (91)	4.5 (110)	3.8 (97)	4.2 (110)	3.4 (86)	4.3 (110)	3.2 (81)	3.4 (86)	3.3 (84)	43.7 (1,110)
Source: Weatherbase
