= Valley Forge, Pennsylvania =

Unincorporated community in Pennsylvania, US

- Unincorporated settlement
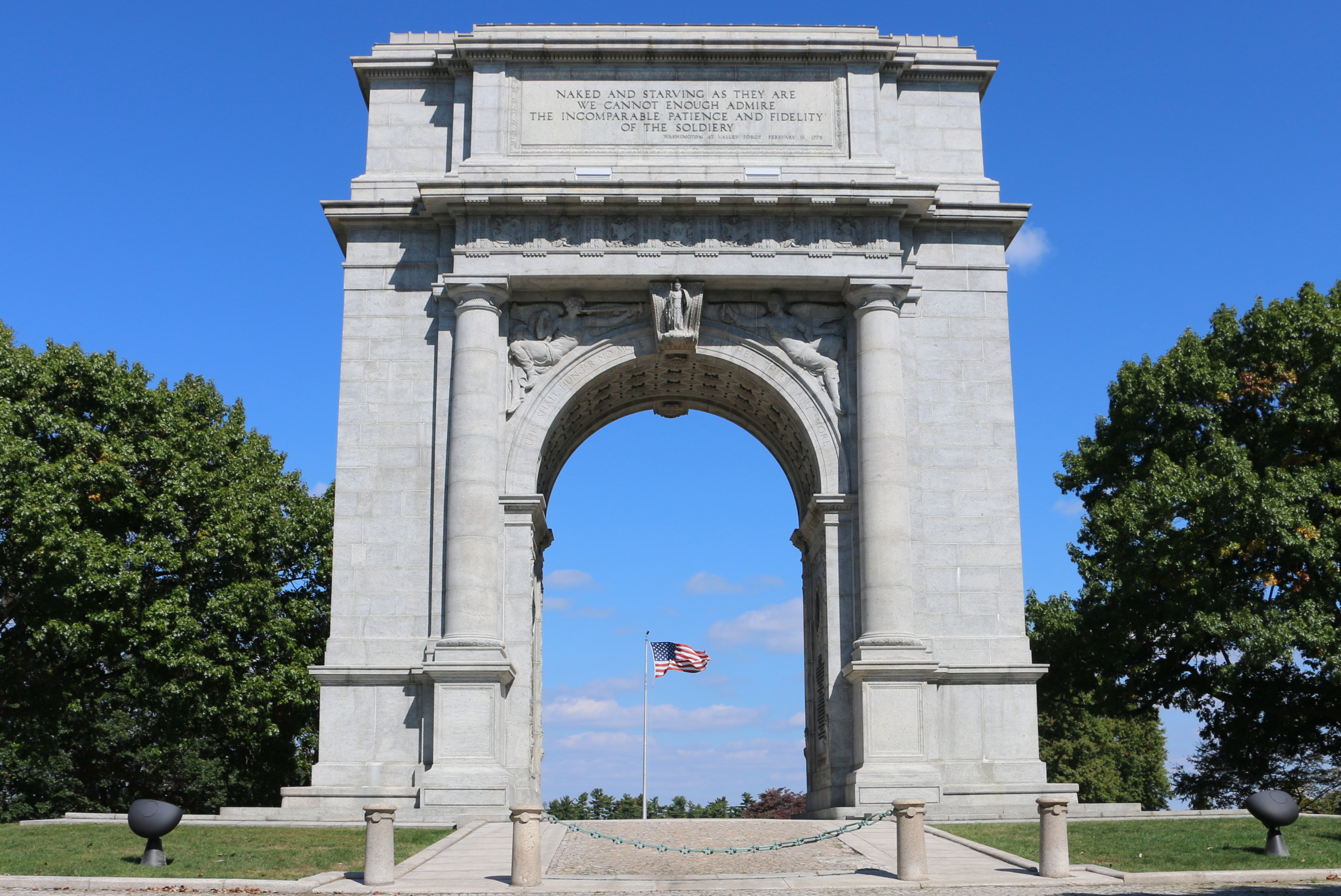
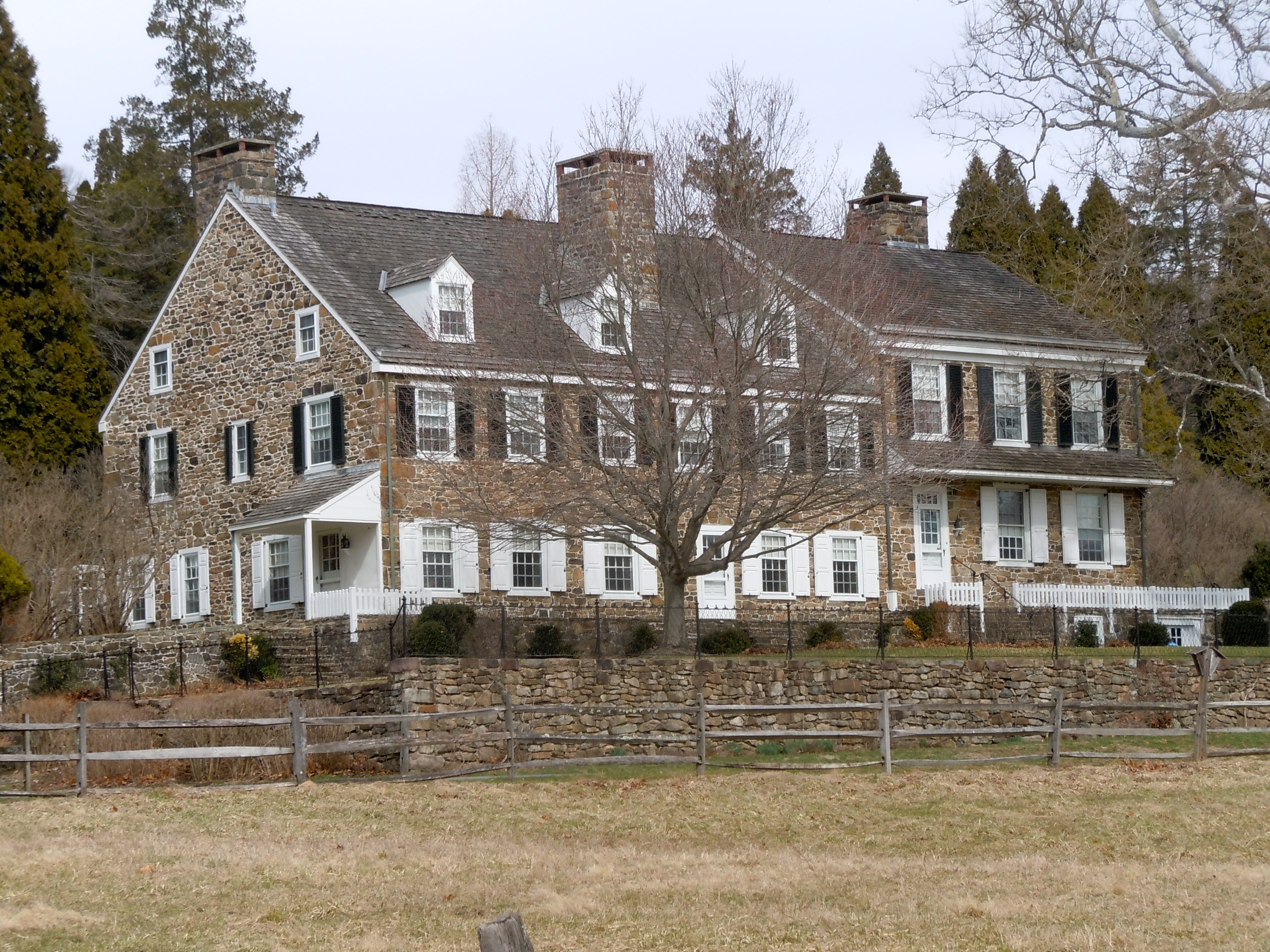
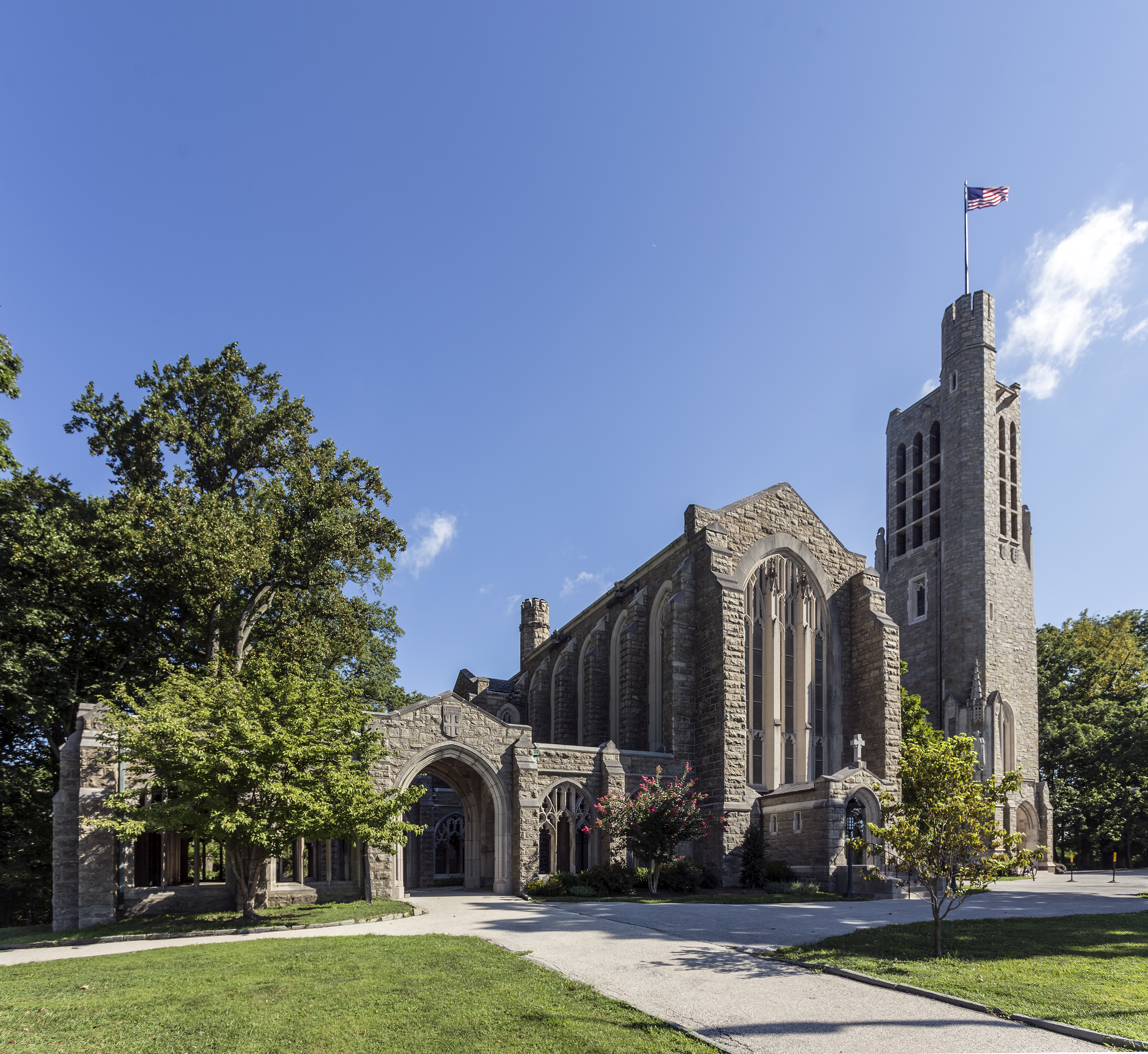
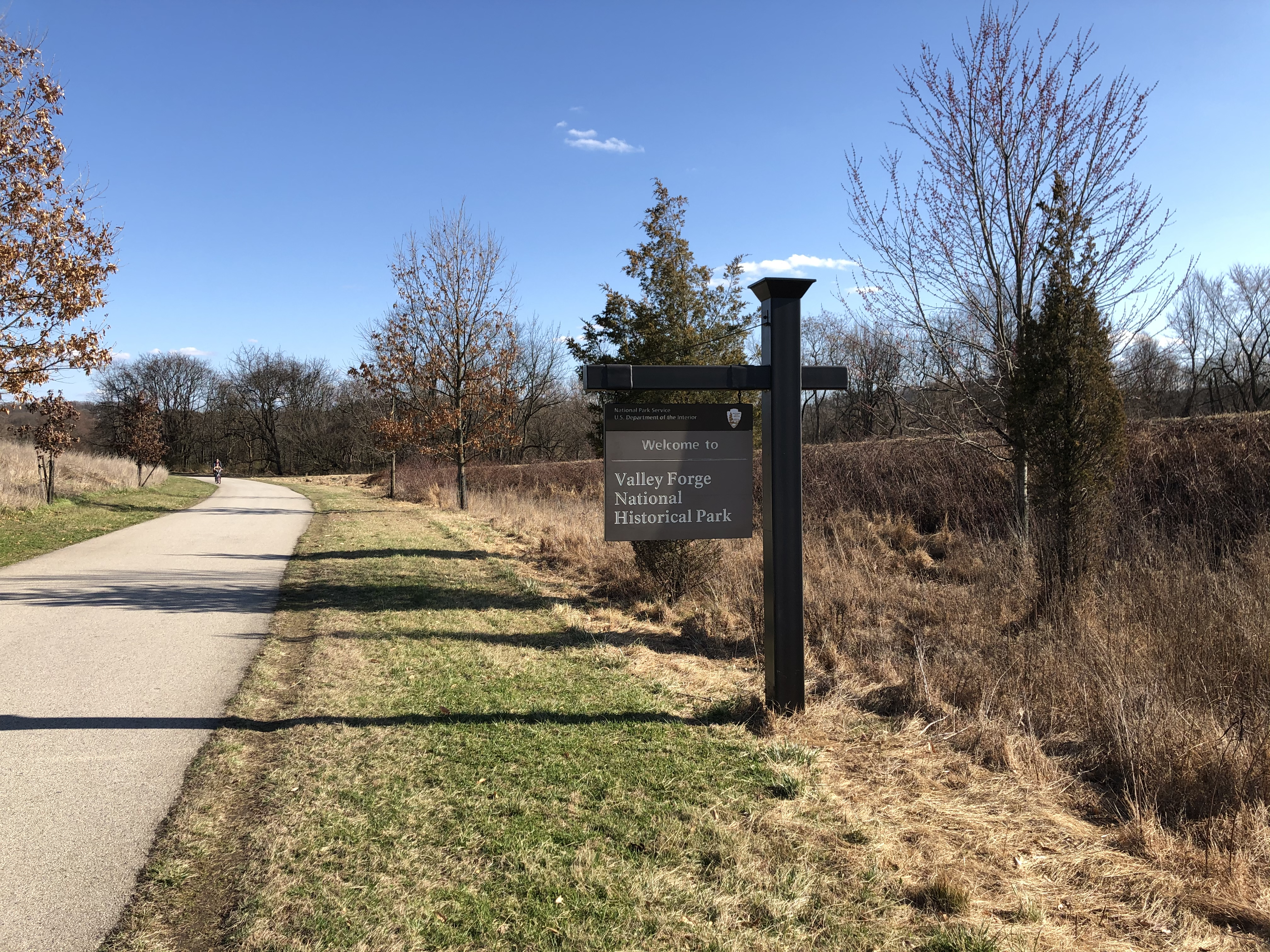
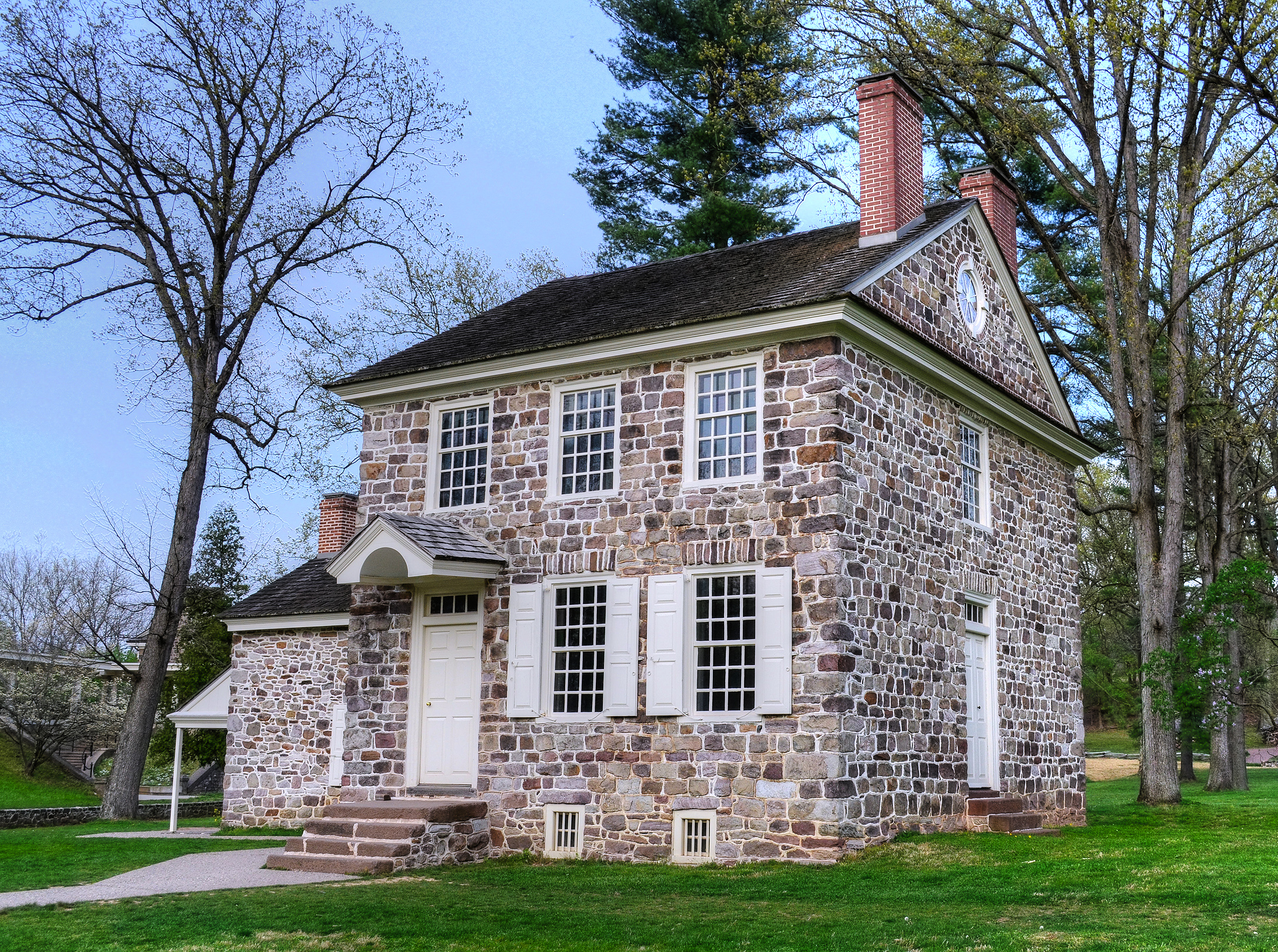
- National Memorial Arch at the Valley Forge National Historical Park Warwick Furnace Farms Washington Memorial Chapel Schuylkill River Trail George Washington's headquarters in Valley Forge

- Location within the U.S. state of Pennsylvania Valley Forge (the United States)
- Coordinates: 40°5′49″N 75°28′12″W
- Country: United States
- State: Pennsylvania
- County: Chester
- Township: Schuylkill
- Time zone: UTC-5 (Eastern (EST))
  - Summer (DST): UTC-4 (EDT)
- ZIP Codes: 19481, 19482, 19484, 19493–19496
- Area codes: 610 and 484

The village of Valley Forge is an unincorporated settlement. It is located on the west side of Valley Forge National Historical Park at the confluence of Valley Creek and the Schuylkill River in Pennsylvania. The remaining village is in Schuylkill Township of Chester County. It once spanned Valley Creek into Montgomery County.

The name Valley Forge is often used to refer to anywhere in the general vicinity of the park. Many places will use the name even though they are actually in King of Prussia, Trooper, Oaks, and other nearby communities. This leads to some ambiguity on the actual location of the modern village. There is a partial re-creation of the historic village from the time of the American Revolution that is located just within the outskirts of the park.

== History ==
In 1751, there was a forge at the mouth of the East Valley creek used to convert pig iron into bar iron. It was advertised for sale as the property of Daniel Walker, Stephen Evans, and Joseph Williams. It was originally called Mount Joy Forge but came to be known as Valley Forge. The pig iron used at Valley Forge was hauled from Warwick Furnace.

In September 1777, the British Army burned it, and George Washington entrenched the Continental Army in December on the Montgomery County side of Valley Creek, opposite Valley Forge. General Washington's headquarters were established at the substantial stone house of Isaac Potts. After the Revolutionary War, another Valley Forge was built on the other side of Valley creek; it was in ruins in 1816.

== See also ==
- Valley Forge
- Washington Memorial Chapel
