= Valley Creek (Pennsylvania) =

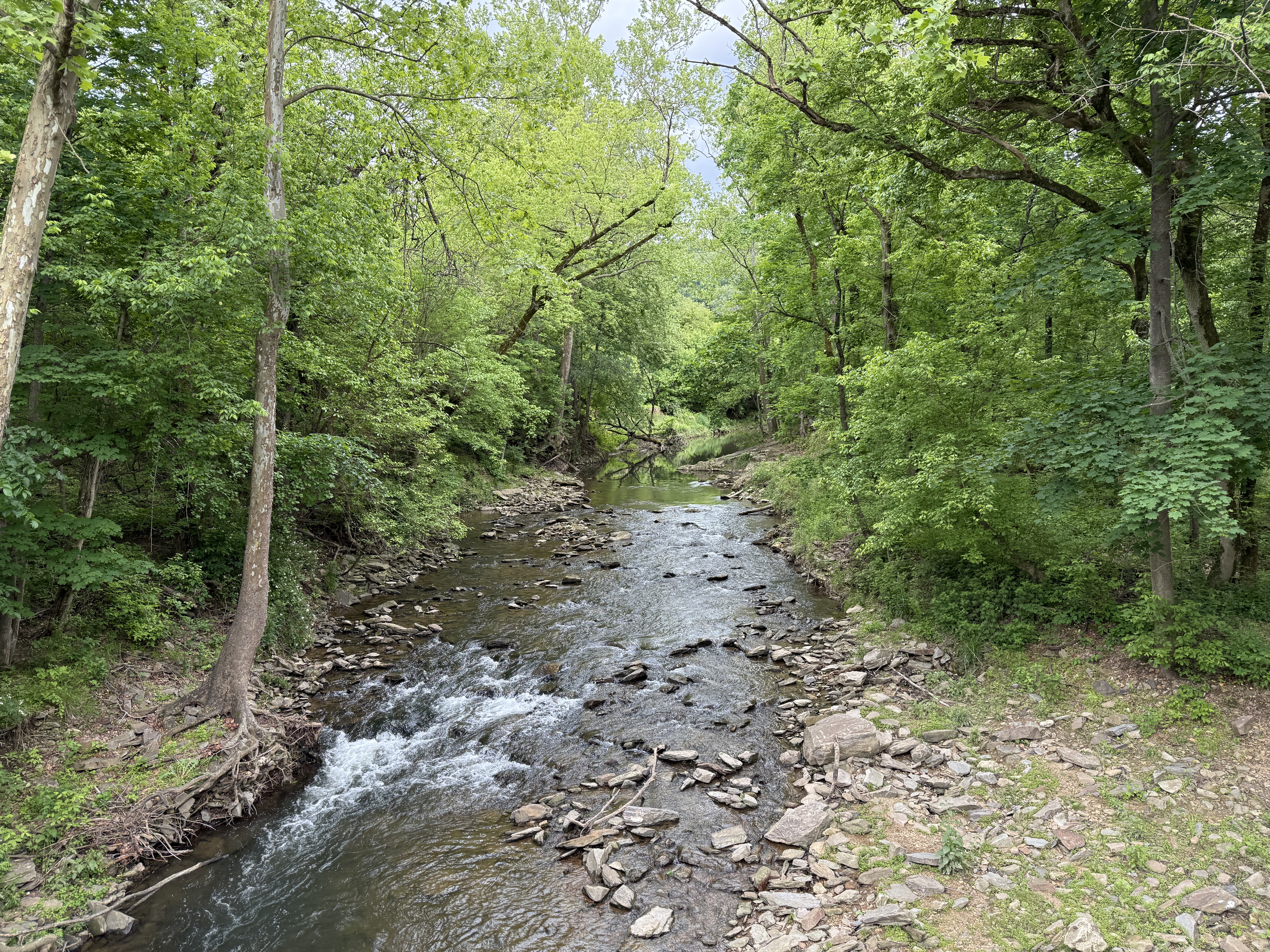
- Valley Creek in Valley Forge

- Location of Valley Creek's Mouth

Location
- Country: United States
- State: Pennsylvania
- Region: Chester County

Physical characteristics
- Mouth: Schuylkill River
  - location: Valley Forge
  - coordinates: 40°06′09″N 75°27′42.4″W
  - elevation: 59 ft (18 m)
- Basin size: 23.4 sq mi (61 km^{2})
- Discharge
  - location: 40°04′45″N 75°27′40″W
  - average: 19 cu ft/s (0.54 m^{3}/s)
  - minimum: 9.1 cu ft/s (0.26 m^{3}/s)
  - maximum: 53 cu ft/s (1.5 m^{3}/s)

Basin features
- Tributaries
  - right: Little Valley Creek

Valley Creek is a 10.8-mile-long (17.4 km) tributary of the Schuylkill River in eastern Chester County, Pennsylvania, United States, flowing through an area known as the Great Valley.

Around 1740 a forge was erected along Valley Creek near its confluence with the Schuylkill. This gave rise to the community of Valley Forge. Later the creek powered a saw mill and grist mill there. In 1777, the forge and mills were destroyed by the British Army during the American Revolutionary War. In December 1777, George Washington chose Valley Forge as the site for the winter encampment of the Continental Army partly because Valley Creek and the Schuylkill River formed natural defensive barriers for the rear of the camp. Washington's Headquarters during this period was in a farmhouse close to the confluence. The American forces departed in the spring of 1778.

== See also ==
- List of rivers of Pennsylvania
