= Great Valley High School =

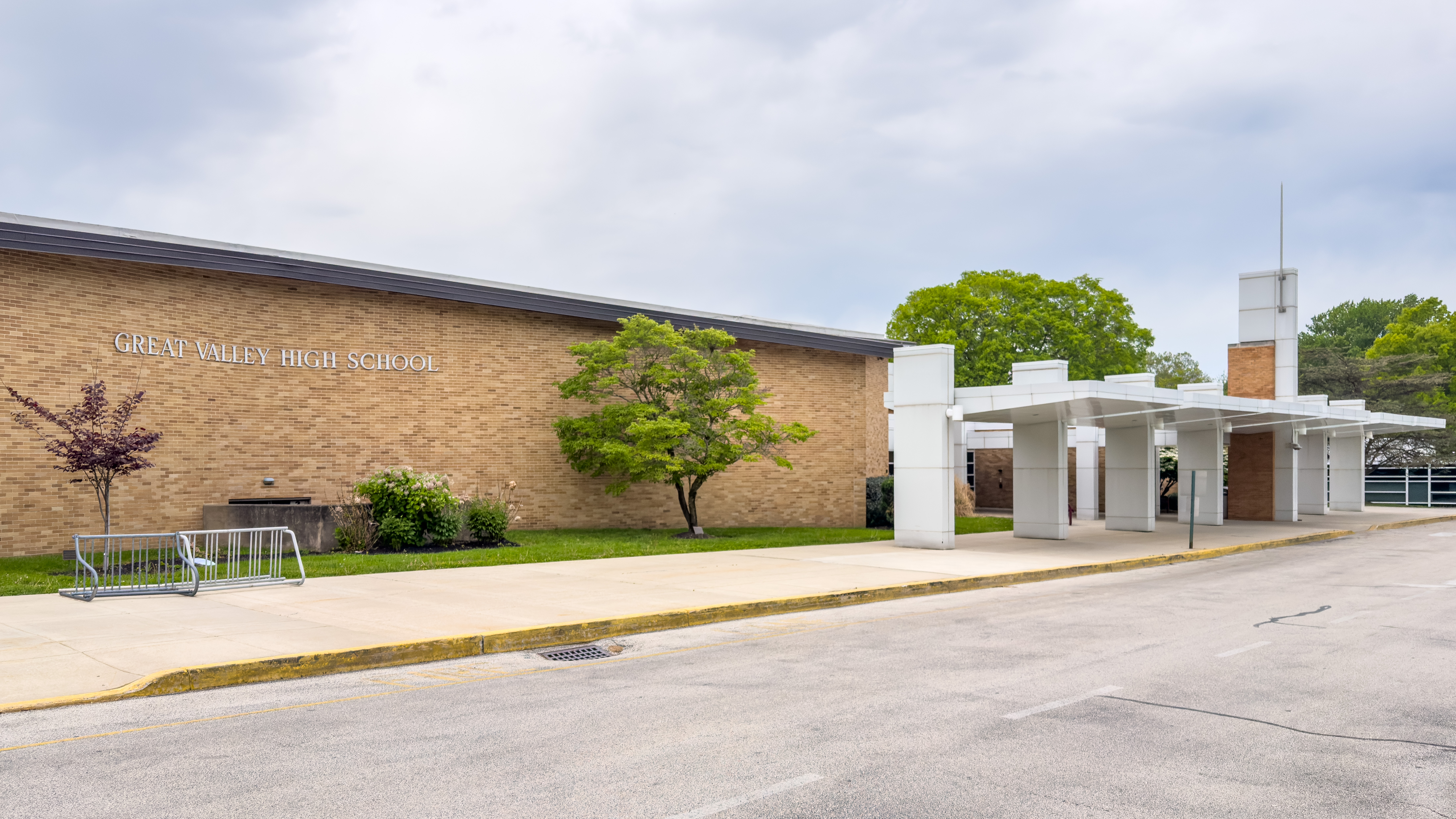

Location
- 225 Phoenixville Pike; Malvern, Pennsylvania; United States; 40.056763°N 75.567095°W

Information
- School type: Public, high school
- Established: 1962
- School district: Great Valley School District
- Principal: Heidi Capetola
- Teaching staff: 104.40 (FTE)
- Grades: 9–12
- Enrollment: 1,432 (2023-2024)
- Student to teacher ratio: 13.72
- Colors: Royal Blue and Silver
- Mascot: Ichabod the Patriot
- Website: http://www.gvsd.org/gvhs

Great Valley High School is a comprehensive, public high school located in Malvern, Pennsylvania. Located on the same campus as Great Valley Middle School at 225 North Phoenixville Pike, it is the only high school in the Great Valley School District.

This high school serves students residing in the Great Valley School District in Grades nine through twelve and enrolls roughly 1,150 to 1,175 students per year. The student to teacher ratio is approximately 14:1.

== Academics ==
Great Valley is consistently ranked among the top public high schools in Pennsylvania. In 2016, The Washington Post ranked Great Valley High School among "America's Most Challenging High Schools", ranking it as the ninth-best high school in Pennsylvania.

In 2024, U.S. News & World Report ranked the school seventh-best in the state and 398th-best nationally. Newsweek magazine ranked the school as 169th-best in the country. In 2023, the College Board listed the school on its AP Honor Roll.

Students at Great Valley High School score in the top 1% in the state in math and science. In 2012, Great Valley High School was ranked first in the state for student performance in science.

== Athletics ==
A logo for Great Valley's High School athletics

Great Valley High School is a member of the Pennsylvania Interscholastic Athletic Association (PIAA). Students are subject to guidelines and principles determined by this organization. Great Valley is a member of the Ches-Mont League and PIAA's District One region. It used to belong to the now defunct Southern Chester County League. Great Valley's largest athletic rival is the Unionville High School Longhorns. The high school offers athletics in all high school grades. In addition, it has an intramural program.

The school has attended and won various state championships. The most recent girls state championship win was by the lacrosse team in 2002, 2005, and 2015. The most recent appearance was in 2006 when the boys soccer team lost in the championship game, but they did win states in 1989, 1990, and 1993. The boys tennis team appeared in the team state championships in 2008 but lost in the semifinals. The tennis team however, won states in 2018 after beating Radnor High School. In 2010, the boys baseball team made their first trip to the state tournament, winning their first game before losing in the quarterfinals. The boys cross country team placed 11th (2010), 8th (2011), and 6th (2012) in the state championship meet. In 2011, the 4 × 400 m relay of Great Valley's storied track & field program came in first in the High School Boys Suburban ChesMont 4x400 event in the Penn Relays, with a time of 3:25.51

== Renovation ==
In 2006, a $36 million renovation was completed on the 1962 building. An addition was added to house the school's STEM classrooms, and a new courtyard and lobby were installed with the expectation that the renovation will allow the school district to serve the Great Valley region for years to come.

== Notable events ==
- In May 1969, two students stole a corpse from the cemetery and hung it from a flag pole. Both were arrested.
- In April 2008, then U.S. presidential candidate Barack Obama held a town hall meeting at Great Valley High School in the gymnasium during his 2008 election campaign. The meeting was open to the public, and several students won the opportunity to sit in the meeting while the rest watched a live taping of it. Two Great Valley students were selected to sing The Star-Spangled Banner before Obama and those who attended the meeting.

== Notable alumni ==
- Cheryl Abplanalp, Team USA handball player in 1996 Summer Olympics
- Nasir Adderley, former professional football player, Los Angeles Chargers
- Mikal Bridges, professional basketball player, New York Knicks
- Fritz Coleman, former weather anchor on KNBC-TV in Los Angeles and stand-up comedian
- Amanda Jane Cooper, Broadway actress, Glinda in Wicked
- Joe Devlin, former professional football player, Buffalo Bills
- Adam McKay, Academy Award-winning actor, writer, and director
- Jimmy McLaughlin, FC Cincinnati professional soccer player
- Duane Milne, former member of the Pennsylvania House of Representatives
- Thom Nickels, author and journalist
- Bryan Russell, record producer
- Alice Sebold, writer
- Chris Young, actor, producer, and director
