= Great Valley School District =

School district in Pennsylvania

Coordinates: 40.05705°N 75.56842°W

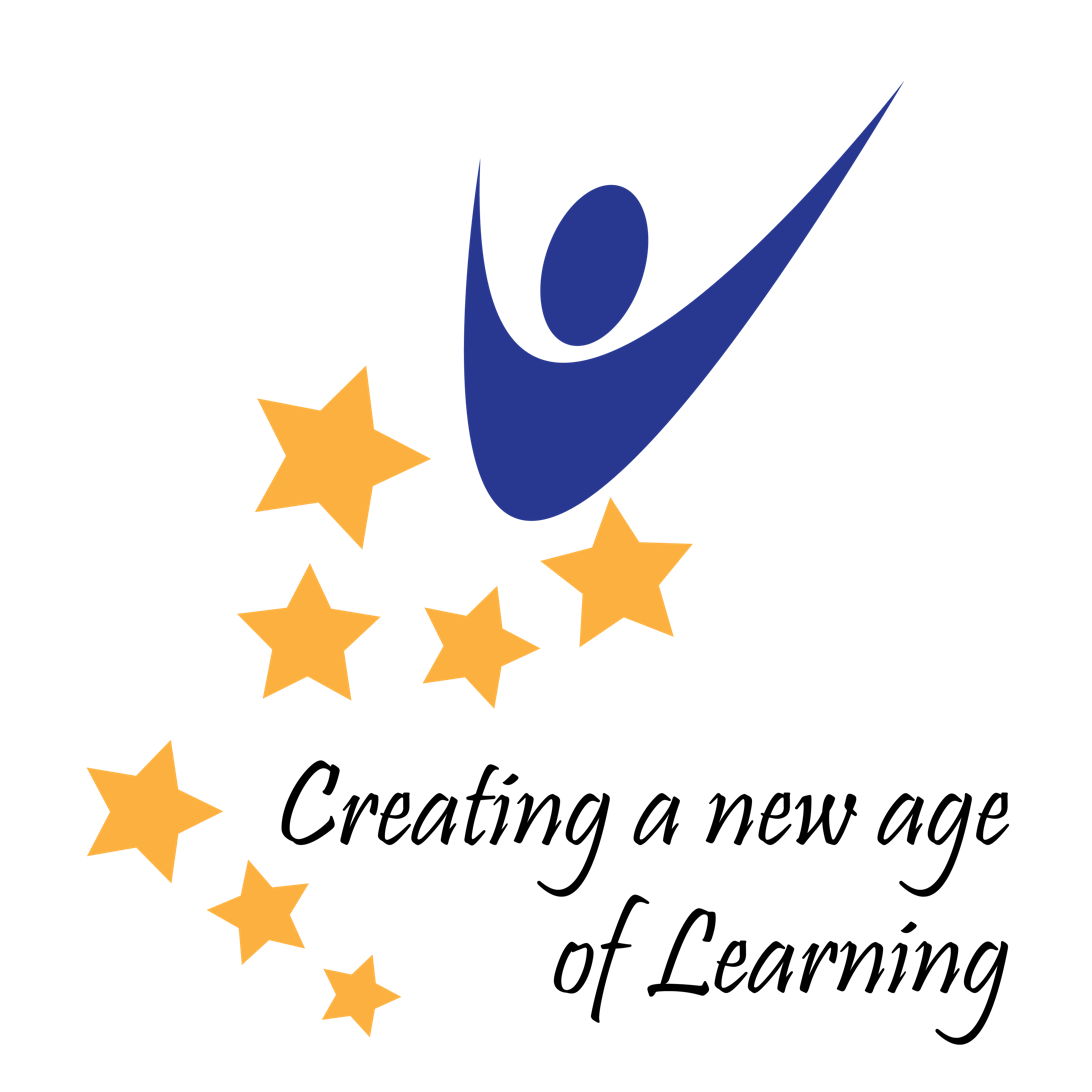

Location
- 47 Church Rd. East Whiteland Township (Malvern address) United States

District information
- Type: Public
- Grades: Pre-K–12
- Established: 1923
- Superintendent: Daniel Goffredo (since 2020)
- Budget: $84.4 million (2014–2015)
- NCES District ID: 4210870

Students and staff
- Students: Approx. 4,000 (2014–15)>
- Athletic conference: PIAA Ches-Mont League

Other information
- Teachers union: Great Valley Education Association (GVEA)
- Website: www.gvsd.org

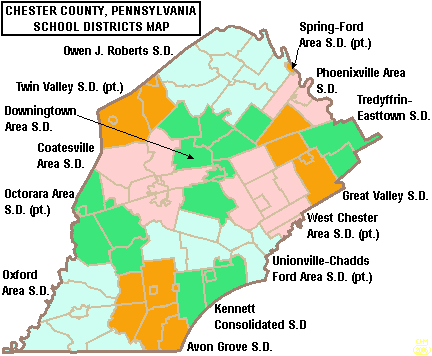
Map of Chester County, Pennsylvania public school districts with Great Valley School District highlighted in orange in the eastern part of the county

Great Valley School District is located on the Philadelphia Main Line in eastern Chester County, Pennsylvania. The district provides public education for students in Charlestown, East Whiteland, and Willistown townships, as well as the borough of Malvern. It includes the Frazer census-designated place and a portion of the Paoli CDP. The district is located in the general area known locally as Great Valley.

Its headquarters are in East Whiteland Township, Pennsylvania.

== History ==
Due to the COVID-19 pandemic, the district operated virtually from March 12, 2020 to August 30, 2021, and had a mask mandate implemented from 2020 to 2022.

In 2024, the school district made national news after school officials discovered that a group of middle school students had created more than 20 TikTok accounts impersonating teachers.

== District schools ==
The district includes four elementary schools, one 5/6 center serving grades 5 and 6, a middle school which serves grades 7-8, and a high school.

=== Charlestown Elementary School ===
Charlestown Elementary School is located in Malvern, Pennsylvania, within Charlestown Township. Christopher Pickell is the school principal.

=== General Wayne Elementary School ===
General Wayne Elementary School is located in Malvern, Pennsylvania, within Willistown Township. The principal is Dr. Melanie McCarthy.

=== Kathryn D. Markley Elementary School ===
The Kathryn D. Markley Elementary School is located in Malvern, Pennsylvania, within East Whiteland Township. Dr. Marshall Hoffritz is the current principal.

=== Sugartown Elementary School ===
Sugartown Elementary School is located in Malvern, Pennsylvania, within Willistown Township. Dr. Nicole Forrest is the principal.

=== Great Valley 5-6 Center ===
The Great Valley 5-6 Center opened for the start of the 2024-2025 school year. The principal is Dr. Kyle Hammond. The assistant principal is Mr. Kevin Bray.

=== Great Valley Middle School ===
Great Valley Middle School is located in East Whiteland Township, Pennsylvania, on the same campus as Great Valley High School. The principal is Dr. Sharon Cohen and the assistant principal is Dr. Andrew Dua.

=== Great Valley High School ===
The high school serves students in ninth through twelfth grade. The high school is located on the same campus as the middle school. The principal is Dr. Heidi Capetola and the assistant principals are Mr. Pat Connors, Ms. Dana Jensen, Mr. Henry McCloskey.

== School organization ==
By the 1990s, when the school had three functioning elementary schools, district population growth necessitated construction of a larger middle school and addition of a fourth elementary school. Once the new middle school was completed, the General Wayne facility was closed and converted into the fourth elementary school. Thereafter, Sugartown students temporarily used the renovated General Wayne school to allow for Sugartown's renovation and expansion. Thereafter, the high school underwent a four-year renovation that was completed during the 2006/2007 school year.

After Sugartown's elementary renovation, reassignment of students to schools within the district was necessary. This process began in June 2004 and was implemented in time for the 2006–2007 school year. Some students throughout the district from the other three elementary schools were relocated to Sugartown.

== Former schools ==
Two older elementary schools, Greentree Elementary in Willistown Township and Malvern Elementary in Malvern Borough, were closed in the early 1980s and the buildings sold. Greentree was renovated and enlarged to become a commercial office building while the Malvern school was renovated and enlarged to become the Malvern borough town hall, police station, and public library.
