= Penn State Great Valley =

Graduate school of Pennsylvania State University

Coordinates: 40.05399°N 75.52289°W

Penn State Great Valley School of Graduate Professional Studies
- Other name: Penn State Great Valley
- Type: Public graduate school
- Established: 1963
- Affiliations: Pennsylvania State University
- Chancellor: Dr. Colin J. Neill
- Students: 173 (Fall 2025)
- Postgraduates: 173 (Fall 2025)
- Location: Malvern, Pennsylvania, U.S.
- Campus: Suburban
- Mascot: Nittany Lion
- Website: greatvalley.psu.edu

Penn State Great Valley, officially the Penn State Great Valley School of Graduate Professional Studies, is a special-mission graduate school of Pennsylvania State University located in Malvern, Pennsylvania. Academic offerings include master's programs in engineering, information science, business, data analytics, finance, accounting, and software engineering. Continuing professional education courses and customized corporate training are also offered.

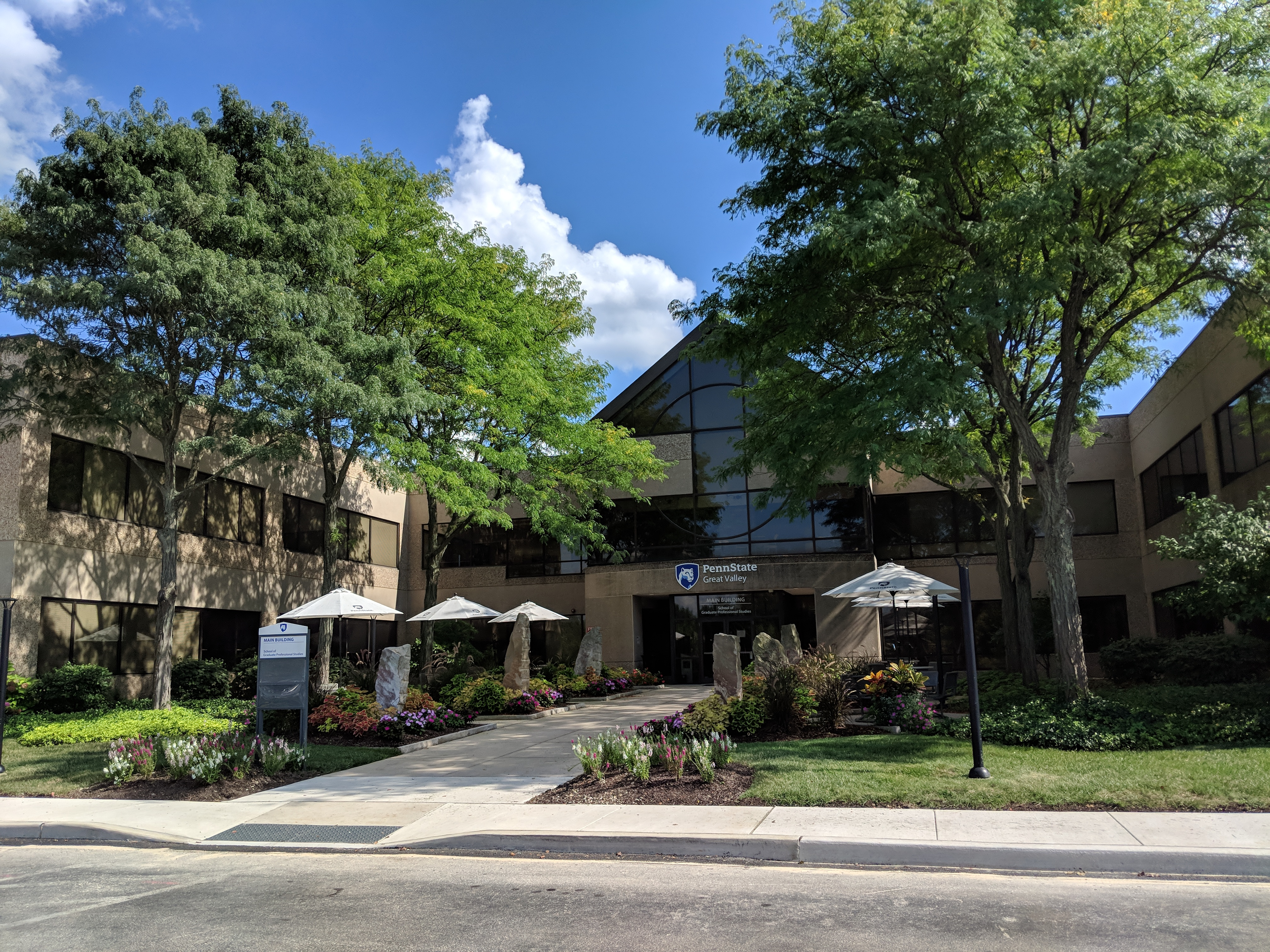
Main Building

== History ==
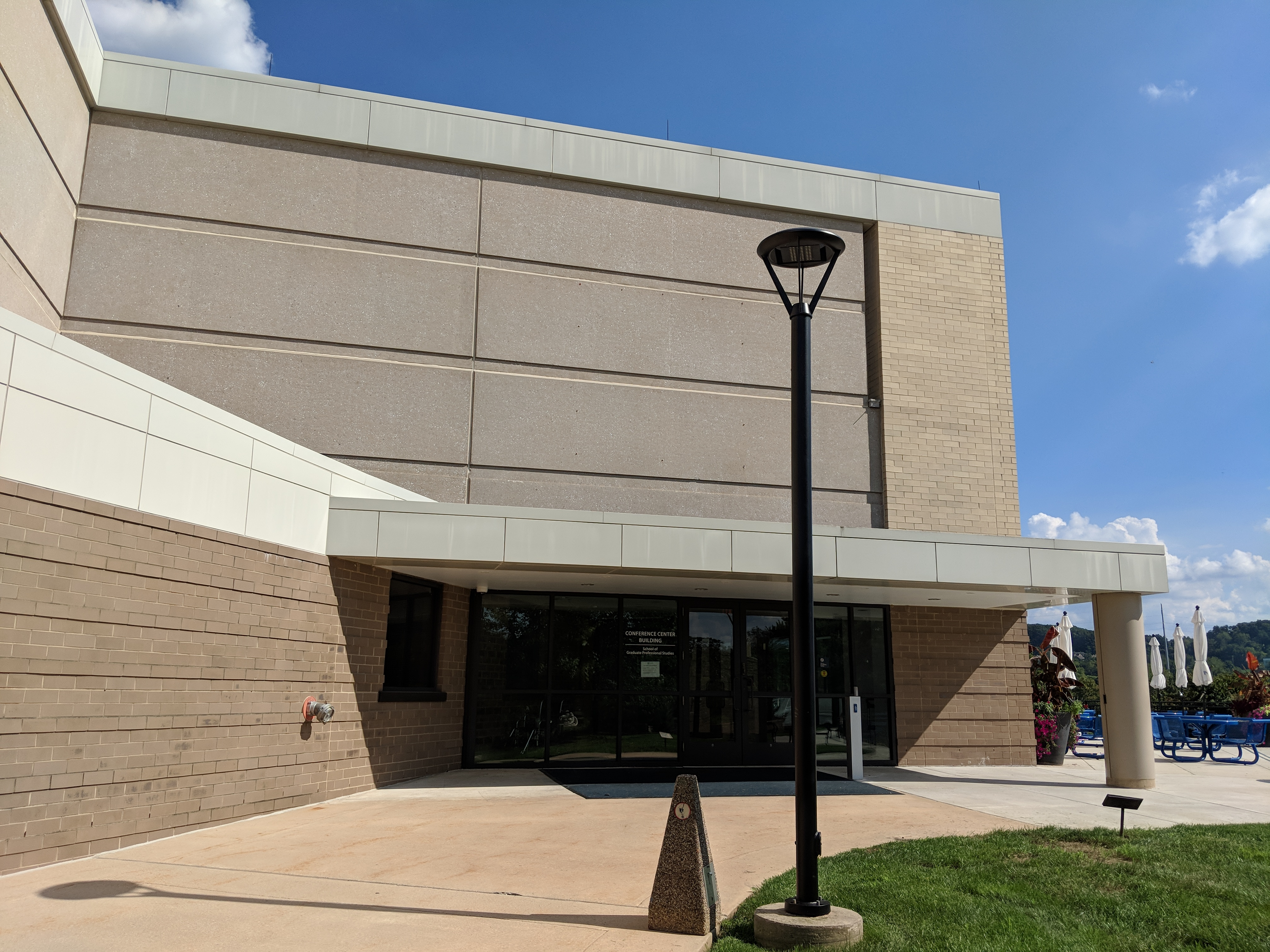
Conference Center Building

Penn State Great Valley, founded in 1963 to provide graduate engineering programs to employees of local businesses, was housed in a rented school building in King of Prussia, Pennsylvania and was known as the King of Prussia Graduate Center. In 1974, the center began offering courses off-site at area businesses. In 1978, the center moved to an old elementary school building in Radnor, Pennsylvania. In 1982 the center moved back to King of Prussia and became the King of Prussia Center for Graduate Studies and Continuing Education.

In 1987, the university acquired 8.5 acres (34,000 m^{2}) within the Great Valley Corporate Center in Malvern, Pennsylvania. A new facility was built on the site earning the distinction of being the first permanent campus in the country located within a corporate park. The campus moved to the new location in 1988, introduced a graduate management program, and changed its name to Penn State Great Valley. In 1998, the Board of Trustees approved the Great Valley campus as a distinct School of Graduate Professional Studies. Due to its expanding programs, the Safeguard Scientifics Building was built next to the original facility and opened in 2001 with a 400-seat auditorium and additional classrooms.

== Academics ==
Penn State Great Valley houses two academic divisions:

- Engineering
- Management

In addition to its degree programs, continuing professional education courses and certificate programs are offered in areas of business and technology. Continuing professional education courses can be customized and delivered to companies and organizations at the Penn State Great Valley campus or at their location.
