= Great Valley Corporate Center =

Business park in Pennsylvania, US

- Development Type: Business Park
- Location: East Whiteland Township, Pennsylvania, U.S.
- Tenant's Operations: Corporate headquarters Regional Offices; Research and Development
- Tenants: Headquarters: Ricoh Americas Corp; Liberty Property Trust; US/Regional Offices: Sanofi-Aventis; Unisys Corporation; Centocor Ortho Biotech; Siemens Healthineers; Penn State Great Valley
- Size: 5,000,000 sq ft (460,000 m^{2})
- Developer: Unknown
- Owner: Liberty Property Trust
- Website: Liberty Property Trust

Great Valley Corporate Center is a business park community in East Whiteland Township, Pennsylvania with a Malvern, Pennsylvania address, located off U.S. Route 202. Great Valley Corporate Center is about 700 acres (2.8 km^{2}) for offices and Research and Development (R&D).

Seven hotels serve the Great Valley area: Wyndham Garden Exton Valley Forge, Homewood Suites by Hilton, Courtyard by Marriott, Desmond Hotel, Holiday Inn Express, Staybridge Suites, Homestead Studio Suites, and Extended Stay America.

On May 31, 1985, then U.S. president Ronald Reagan visited the center, saying:

It's great to be here at the (Great) Valley Corporate Center, the workplace of the future. Here in the Route 202 corridor, America is truly on a high-tech highway, rolling full speed ahead, and there ain't no stopping us now.
