= Burton =

Burton, Burtons, or Burton's may refer to:

== Companies ==
- Burton (retailer), a clothing retailer
  - Burton's, Abergavenny, a shop built for the company in 1937
  - The Montague Burton Building, Dublin a shop built for the company between 1929 and 1930
- Burton Brewery Company
- Burton Snowboards
- Burton's Biscuit Company

== People ==
- Burton (name) (includes list of people with the name)

== Places ==
=== Australia ===
- Burton, Queensland
- Burton, South Australia

=== Canada ===
- Burton, British Columbia
- Burton, New Brunswick
- Burton Parish, New Brunswick
- Burton, Prince Edward Island
- Burtons, Nova Scotia

=== United Kingdom ===
==== England ====
- Burton (near Neston), on the Wirral Peninsula, Cheshire
- Burton (near Tarporley), in the area of Cheshire West and Chester, Cheshire
- Burton-in-Kendal, Cumbria
- Burton, Dorset
- Burton on the Wolds, Leicestershire
- Burton Latimer, Northamptonshire
- Burton, Lincolnshire
- Burton-upon-Stather, North Lincolnshire
- Burton in Lonsdale, North Yorkshire
- Burton-on-Yore, North Yorkshire
- Burton, Northumberland
- Burton upon Trent, East Staffordshire, including:
  - Burton (UK Parliament constituency)
  - Burton, Staffordshire (civil parish)
- Burton Pynsent, Somerset
- Burton, Nettleton, Wiltshire
- Burton, Mere, Wiltshire

==== Wales ====
- Burton, Pembrokeshire
  - Burton (Pembrokeshire electoral ward)
- Burton, Wrexham

=== United States ===
- Burton, Arizona
- Burton, Georgia
- Burton, Idaho
- Burton, Illinois
- Burton, Kentucky
- Burton, Michigan
- Burton, Missouri
- Burton, Nebraska
- Burton, Ohio
- Burton, South Carolina
- Burton, Texas
- Burton, Washington
- Burton, West Virginia
- Burton, Wisconsin
- Burton City, Ohio
- Burton, an unincorporated community of Owosso Township, Michigan

== Transportation ==
- Burton (car)
- Burton (steamboat)
- HMS Burton, renamed Exmoor, a Royal Navy destroyer

== Other uses ==
- Burton (crater) on Mars
- Burton (nut)
- Burton Albion F.C., an English football club
- Burton RFC, an English rugby union team
- Burton v. Florida, 2010
- Burton v. United States, 1905/6
- Burton's Gentleman's Magazine, U.S., 1837–1840
- Burton's gerbil, Gerbillus burtoni
- Burton Machine Rifle, a 1917 prototype rifle

== See also ==
- Bourton (disambiguation)
- Bruton (disambiguation)
- Burdon (disambiguation)
- Butrón (disambiguation)
- Lake Burton (disambiguation)
- Burton Township (disambiguation)
