= Hungry Mother Creek =

Stream in Missouri, U.S.

Hungry Mother Creek is a stream in Howard County in the U.S. state of Missouri.

The headwaters of the stream arise in the northeast corner of Howard County at a small lake just west of Missouri Route A about three miles south of Higbee. The stream flows south-southwest passing under Missouri Route O just west of Bunker Hill. It continues to the south-southwest passing under Missouri Route 124 and on to its confluence with Moniteau Creek west of Sebree.

The headwaters are at 39°15′29″N 92°30′08″W and the confluence is at 39°07′23″N 92°33′54″W.

According to tradition, Hungry Mother Creek was originally called Hunger's Mother Creek, on account of a party of frontiersmen who wintered there.

== See also ==
- List of rivers of Missouri
