= Cole Creek (Hungry Mother Creek tributary) =

Stream in the US state of Missouri

Coordinates: 39.1855919°N 92.5407364°W

Cole Creek is a stream in Howard County in the U.S. state of Missouri. It is a tributary of Hungry Mother Creek.

Cole Creek was named after nearby Coles Fort.

== See also ==
- List of rivers of Missouri
