= Burton Township, Illinois =

Burton Township, Illinois may refer to one of the following places:

- Burton Township, Adams County, Illinois
- Burton Township, McHenry County, Illinois

See also

- Burton Township (disambiguation)
