= Bear Hollow Creek =

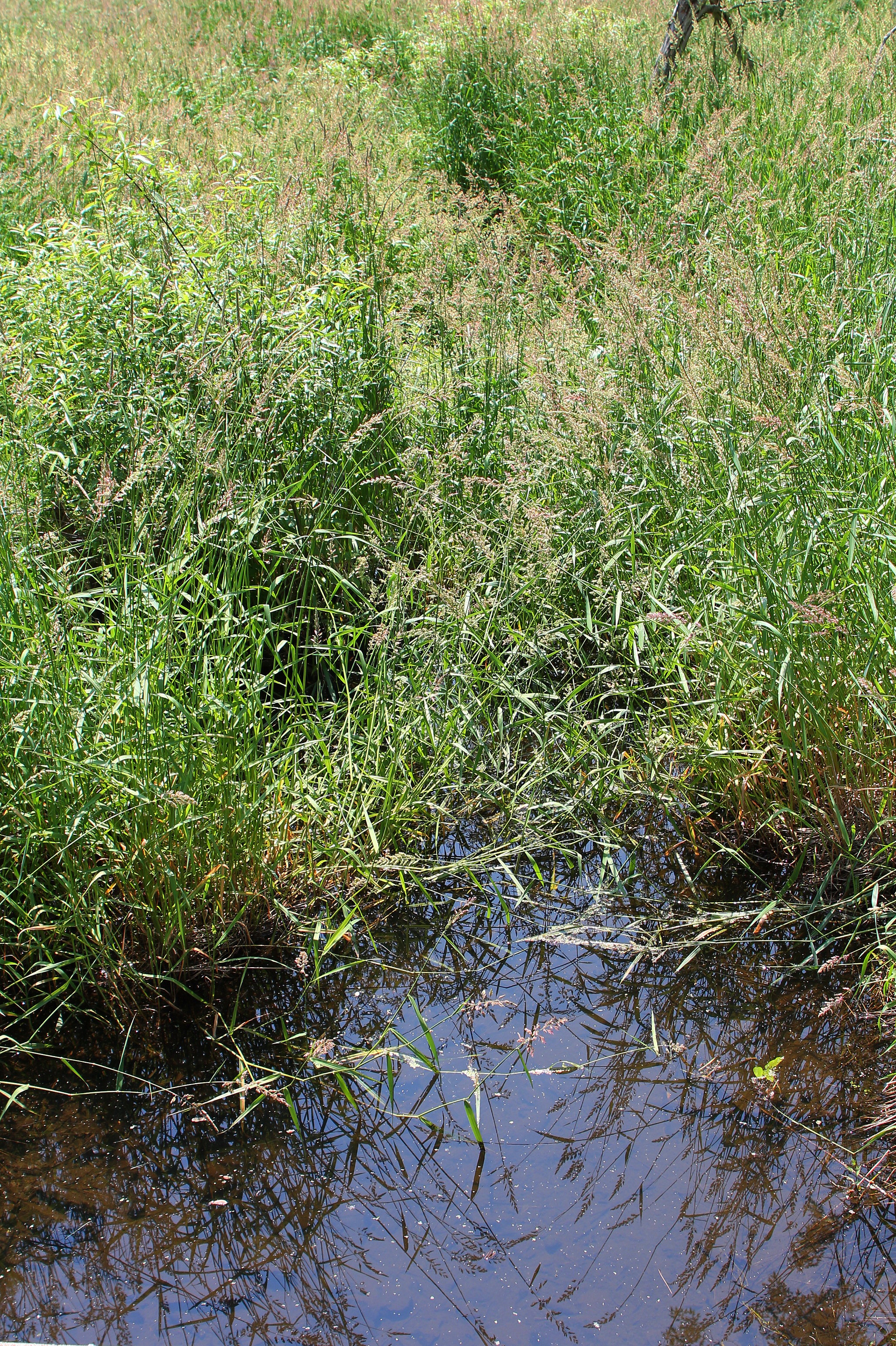
- Bear Hollow Creek, mostly obscured by tall grass

Physical characteristics
- Source
  - location: pond near Bear Hollow Road in Lake Township, Luzerne County, Pennsylvania
  - elevation: between 1,160 and 1,180 feet (350 and 360 m)
- Mouth
  - location: Harveys Creek in Lake Township, Luzerne County, Pennsylvania
  - coordinates: 41°20′00″N 76°04′22″W
  - elevation: 1,125 ft (343 m)
- Length: 2.0 mi (3.2 km)

Basin features
- Progression: Harveys Creek → Susquehanna River → Chesapeake Bay

Bear Hollow Creek is a tributary of Harveys Creek in Luzerne County, Pennsylvania, in the United States. It is approximately 2.0 miles (3.2 km) long and flows through Lake Township. The creek was used as a water supply in the early 1900s. During glacial times, its valley, Bear Hollow, served as a glacial sluiceway. The surficial geology near the creek features alluvium, Wisconsinan Till, Wisconsinan Boulder Till, a peat bog, and bedrock consisting of sandstone and shale. Bear Hollow is listed on the Luzerne County Natural Areas Inventory.

== Course ==
Bear Hollow Creek begins in a small pond near Bear Hollow Road in Lake Township. It flows south-southeast alongside Bear Hollow Road in a valley known as Bear Hollow for approximately a mile. The creek then turns southeast and continues flowing alongside Bear Hollow Road as its valley broadens. After approximately a mile, it reaches its confluence with Harveys Creek.

== Geography and geology ==
The elevation near the mouth of Bear Hollow Creek is 1,125 feet (343 m) above sea level. The elevation of the creek's source is between 1,160 and 1,180 feet (350 and 360 m) above sea level.

Bear Hollow, the valley of Bear Hollow Creek, served as a deep glacial sluiceway during glaciation. It drained Glacial Lake Bowman into Harveys Creek.

The surficial geology in the vicinity of Bear Hollow Creek features alluvium in its lower and upper reaches. Glacial or resedimented tills such as Wisconsinan Till and Wisconsinan Bouldery Till occur in the creek's valley and bedrock consisting of sandstone and shale occurs in the surficial geology on the slopes of the valley. A patch of peat bog is situated in the creek's middle reaches.

== Watershed ==
Bear Hollow Creek is entirely within the United States Geological Survey quadrangle of Harveys Lake. The watershed is part of the Lower North Branch Susquehanna drainage basin.

There is a small open wetland along Bear Hollow Creek. A dirt road runs alongside the creek.

== History ==
Bear Hollow Creek was added to the Geographic Names Information System on August 1, 1989. Its identifier in the Geographic Names Information System is 1212409.

Bear Hollow Creek appears on county maps published by the Pennsylvania Department of Transportation.

In the early 1900s, Bear Hollow Creek was used as a water supply by the Nanticoke Water Company. The creek's water made up one thirtieth of the company's water supply.

== Biology ==
Wild trout naturally reproduce in Bear Hollow Creek from its headwaters downstream to its mouth.

Bear Hollow is listed on the Luzerne County Natural Areas Inventory. The hollow contains an eastern hemlock forest and has a very high level of amphibian biodiversity. Amphibian species that inhabit the area include northern red salamander, northern dusky salamander, redback salamander, red-spotted newt, spotted salamander, and spring peeper. Insect species such as Comet Darner, Lance-tipped Darner, Great Blue Skimmer, and Amber-winged Spreadwing also occur in the hollow.

The forests in Bear Hollow are second-growth forests consisting of hemlock, sugar maple, bitternut hickory, beech, basswood, white ash, and red oak.

== See also ==
- Paint Spring Run, next tributary of Harveys Creek going downstream
- List of rivers of Pennsylvania
