= Burton Township, Howard County, Missouri =

Township in Howard County, Missouri, U.S.

Coordinates: 39.2486°N 92.6175°W

Burton Township is an inactive township in Howard County, in the U.S. state of Missouri.

Burton Township was erected in 1880, taking its name from the community of Burton, Missouri.
