= 1984 United States presidential election in Missouri =

- November 6, 1984

Nominee	Ronald Reagan	Walter Mondale
Party	Republican	Democratic
Home state	California	Minnesota
Running mate	George H. W. Bush	Geraldine Ferraro
Electoral vote	11	0
Popular vote	1,274,188	848,583
Percentage	60.02%	39.98%
County results
Reagan
50–60%
60–70%
70–80%
80–90%
Mondale
50–60%
60–70%
President before election
Ronald Reagan
Republican
Elected President
Ronald Reagan
Republican

The 1984 United States presidential election in Missouri took place on November 6, 1984. All 50 states and the District of Columbia, were part of the 1984 United States presidential election. Voters chose 11 electors to the Electoral College, which selected the president and vice president of the United States.

Missouri was won by incumbent United States President Ronald Reagan of California, who was running against former Vice President Walter Mondale of Minnesota. Reagan ran for a second time with Vice-president George H. W. Bush of Texas, and Mondale ran with Representative Geraldine Ferraro of New York, the first major female candidate for the vice presidency.

The presidential election of 1984 was a perfectly partisan election in Missouri, with 100% of the electorate voting for either the Democratic or the Republican nominee, as only those two appeared on the ballot. Accordingly, every county gave either Mondale or Reagan an outright majority: five (including the county-equivalent of the city of St Louis) gave Mondale a majority; the rest gave Reagan one. Reagan's strongest performance was in Gasconade County, which gave him 80.54% of its ballots; Mondale's was in the city of St Louis, which gave him 64.80%. Missouri weighed in for this election as 2 percentage points more Republican than the national average. Reagan won the state in a landslide, amassing over 60% of the vote, slightly more than his national vote share. Republicans would not win the state again by double digits until 2016.

Reagan performed particularly strongly in its largest county or county-equivalent, suburban St Louis County (which does not include the city of St Louis), where he got 64% of the vote. He also got over 2/3 of the vote in the Show-Me State's fourth-largest county, historically Republican Greene County (home of Springfield). Mondale scored a strong win in the city of St Louis, where he got 64.8%, and eked out a narrow victory in Jackson County, home of Kansas City. However, he could not match Reagan in rural and small-town Missouri; aside from Jackson County and the city of St Louis, Mondale had only three other wins in Missouri's counties and county-equivalents, with his only convincing win being in the historically secessionist and highly unionized Lead Belt county of Reynolds County (he also narrowly won Oregon and Mississippi Counties). Reagan became the first Republican nominee to sweep Missouri's 'Little Dixie' region, as he became the first Republican ever to carry Monroe County. This feat was repeated by George W. Bush in 2004 (and, excluding Boone County, home to the University of Missouri, by every subsequent Republican nominee as of 2024).

== Results ==
1984 United States presidential election in Missouri
Party	Candidate	Votes	Percentage	Electoral votes
Republican	Ronald Reagan (incumbent)	1,274,188	60.02%	11
Democratic	Walter Mondale	848,583	39.98%	0
Totals		2,122,771	100.0%	11

=== Results by county ===
County	Ronald Reagan Republican		Walter Mondale Democratic		Margin		Total
County	#	%	#	%	#	%	Total
Adair	6,430	67.34%	3,119	32.66%	3,311	34.68%	9,549
Andrew	4,252	63.38%	2,457	36.62%	1,795	26.76%	6,709
Atchison	2,277	65.13%	1,219	34.87%	1,058	30.26%	3,496
Audrain	7,261	60.90%	4,662	39.10%	2,599	21.80%	11,923
Barry	7,683	68.81%	3,483	31.19%	4,200	37.62%	11,166
Barton	3,996	74.78%	1,348	25.22%	2,648	49.56%	5,344
Bates	4,223	59.38%	2,889	40.62%	1,334	18.76%	7,112
Benton	3,805	62.83%	2,251	37.17%	1,554	25.66%	6,056
Bollinger	2,778	59.09%	1,923	40.91%	855	18.18%	4,701
Boone	26,600	57.87%	19,364	42.13%	7,236	15.74%	45,964
Buchanan	19,735	56.22%	15,369	43.78%	4,366	12.44%	35,104
Butler	8,712	64.96%	4,699	35.04%	4,013	29.92%	13,411
Caldwell	2,678	65.96%	1,382	34.04%	1,296	31.92%	4,060
Callaway	8,262	65.63%	4,327	34.37%	3,935	31.26%	12,589
Camden	8,057	72.29%	3,088	27.71%	4,969	44.58%	11,145
Cape Girardeau	17,404	70.32%	7,346	29.68%	10,058	40.64%	24,750
Carroll	3,495	63.84%	1,980	36.16%	1,515	27.68%	5,475
Carter	1,402	60.48%	916	39.52%	486	20.96%	2,318
Cass	14,456	65.79%	7,517	34.21%	6,939	31.58%	21,973
Cedar	3,539	71.08%	1,440	28.92%	2,099	42.16%	4,979
Chariton	2,744	55.01%	2,244	44.99%	500	10.02%	4,988
Christian	7,634	70.31%	3,223	29.69%	4,411	40.62%	10,857
Clark	2,068	55.97%	1,627	44.03%	441	11.94%	3,695
Clay	36,529	61.79%	22,586	38.21%	13,943	23.58%	59,115
Clinton	4,226	60.34%	2,778	39.66%	1,448	20.68%	7,004
Cole	20,366	75.24%	6,702	24.76%	13,664	50.48%	27,068
Cooper	4,603	67.47%	2,219	32.53%	2,384	34.94%	6,822
Crawford	4,716	64.37%	2,610	35.63%	2,106	28.74%	7,326
Dade	2,600	70.27%	1,100	29.73%	1,500	40.54%	3,700
Dallas	3,577	65.29%	1,902	34.71%	1,675	30.58%	5,479
Daviess	2,414	61.27%	1,526	38.73%	888	22.54%	3,940
DeKalb	2,188	59.91%	1,464	40.09%	724	19.82%	3,652
Dent	3,490	57.84%	2,544	42.16%	946	15.68%	6,034
Douglas	3,662	70.45%	1,536	29.55%	2,126	40.90%	5,198
Dunklin	6,092	55.09%	4,967	44.91%	1,125	10.18%	11,059
Franklin	18,669	69.18%	8,319	30.82%	10,350	38.36%	26,988
Gasconade	4,678	80.54%	1,130	19.46%	3,548	61.08%	5,808
Gentry	2,047	56.13%	1,600	43.87%	447	12.26%	3,647
Greene	57,250	67.18%	27,965	32.82%	29,285	34.36%	85,215
Grundy	3,156	62.91%	1,861	37.09%	1,295	25.82%	5,017
Harrison	2,844	63.30%	1,649	36.70%	1,195	26.60%	4,493
Henry	5,419	59.16%	3,741	40.84%	1,678	18.32%	9,160
Hickory	2,190	64.37%	1,212	35.63%	978	28.74%	3,402
Holt	2,087	67.04%	1,026	32.96%	1,061	34.08%	3,113
Howard	2,360	53.96%	2,014	46.04%	346	7.92%	4,374
Howell	8,204	68.53%	3,767	31.47%	4,437	37.06%	11,971
Iron	2,316	53.38%	2,023	46.62%	293	6.76%	4,339
Jackson	132,271	49.48%	135,067	50.52%	-2,796	-1.04%	267,338
Jasper	23,066	71.36%	9,259	28.64%	13,807	42.72%	32,325
Jefferson	34,525	63.29%	20,026	36.71%	14,499	26.58%	54,551
Johnson	8,413	66.50%	4,238	33.50%	4,175	33.00%	12,651
Knox	1,513	57.97%	1,097	42.03%	416	15.94%	2,610
Laclede	6,406	70.62%	2,665	29.38%	3,741	41.24%	9,071
Lafayette	8,581	63.90%	4,848	36.10%	3,733	27.80%	13,429
Lawrence	8,370	69.23%	3,720	30.77%	4,650	38.46%	12,090
Lewis	2,438	55.22%	1,977	44.78%	461	10.44%	4,415
Lincoln	6,137	65.10%	3,290	34.90%	2,847	30.20%	9,427
Linn	3,822	55.12%	3,112	44.88%	710	10.24%	6,934
Livingston	4,090	60.24%	2,699	39.76%	1,391	20.48%	6,789
Macon	4,542	59.93%	3,037	40.07%	1,505	19.86%	7,579
Madison	2,808	60.13%	1,862	39.87%	946	20.26%	4,670
Maries	2,267	62.02%	1,388	37.98%	879	24.04%	3,655
Marion	6,831	59.42%	4,666	40.58%	2,165	18.84%	11,497
McDonald	4,521	68.19%	2,109	31.81%	2,412	36.38%	6,630
Mercer	1,229	58.41%	875	41.59%	354	16.82%	2,104
Miller	6,706	76.55%	2,054	23.45%	4,652	53.10%	8,760
Mississippi	2,502	49.78%	2,524	50.22%	-22	-0.44%	5,026
Moniteau	4,197	72.23%	1,614	27.77%	2,583	44.46%	5,811
Monroe	2,163	52.06%	1,992	47.94%	171	4.12%	4,155
Montgomery	3,261	66.16%	1,668	33.84%	1,593	32.32%	4,929
Morgan	4,392	66.94%	2,169	33.06%	2,223	33.88%	6,561
New Madrid	4,323	53.38%	3,776	46.62%	547	6.76%	8,099
Newton	11,709	71.69%	4,623	28.31%	7,086	43.38%	16,332
Nodaway	5,471	60.21%	3,615	39.79%	1,856	20.42%	9,086
Oregon	1,979	49.41%	2,026	50.59%	-47	-1.18%	4,005
Osage	4,381	76.54%	1,343	23.46%	3,038	53.08%	5,724
Ozark	2,614	70.19%	1,110	29.81%	1,504	40.38%	3,724
Pemiscot	3,733	53.13%	3,293	46.87%	440	6.26%	7,026
Perry	4,493	70.98%	1,837	29.02%	2,656	41.96%	6,330
Pettis	10,991	67.00%	5,413	33.00%	5,578	34.00%	16,404
Phelps	9,012	63.98%	5,074	36.02%	3,938	27.96%	14,086
Pike	3,933	54.28%	3,313	45.72%	620	8.56%	7,246
Platte	12,859	62.64%	7,668	37.36%	5,191	25.28%	20,527
Polk	5,467	65.98%	2,819	34.02%	2,648	31.96%	8,286
Pulaski	5,330	65.04%	2,865	34.96%	2,465	30.08%	8,195
Putnam	1,540	65.90%	797	34.10%	743	31.80%	2,337
Ralls	2,067	50.69%	2,011	49.31%	56	1.38%	4,078
Randolph	5,735	56.19%	4,471	43.81%	1,264	12.38%	10,206
Ray	4,875	55.06%	3,979	44.94%	896	10.12%	8,854
Reynolds	1,330	39.63%	2,026	60.37%	-696	-20.74%	3,356
Ripley	2,927	60.85%	1,883	39.15%	1,044	21.70%	4,810
Saline	6,042	58.53%	4,281	41.47%	1,761	17.06%	10,323
Schuyler	1,250	52.28%	1,141	47.72%	109	4.56%	2,391
Scotland	1,485	58.01%	1,075	41.99%	410	16.02%	2,560
Scott	8,727	61.05%	5,569	38.95%	3,158	22.10%	14,296
Shannon	1,779	52.96%	1,580	47.04%	199	5.92%	3,359
Shelby	2,243	58.78%	1,573	41.22%	670	17.56%	3,816
St. Charles	47,784	73.06%	17,617	26.94%	30,167	46.12%	65,401
St. Clair	2,667	61.71%	1,655	38.29%	1,012	23.42%	4,322
St. Francois	9,792	57.84%	7,137	42.16%	2,655	15.68%	16,929
St. Louis	307,684	63.99%	173,144	36.01%	134,540	27.98%	480,828
St. Louis City	61,020	35.20%	112,318	64.80%	-51,298	-29.60%	173,338
Ste. Genevieve	3,245	54.37%	2,723	45.63%	522	8.74%	5,968
Stoddard	6,701	60.95%	4,294	39.05%	2,407	21.90%	10,995
Stone	5,706	72.92%	2,119	27.08%	3,587	45.84%	7,825
Sullivan	2,306	56.38%	1,784	43.62%	522	12.76%	4,090
Taney	7,082	70.86%	2,912	29.14%	4,170	41.72%	9,994
Texas	5,591	60.42%	3,662	39.58%	1,929	20.84%	9,253
Vernon	5,181	63.45%	2,984	36.55%	2,197	26.90%	8,165
Warren	5,150	72.39%	1,964	27.61%	3,186	44.78%	7,114
Washington	3,755	55.70%	2,987	44.30%	768	11.40%	6,742
Wayne	2,867	54.82%	2,363	45.18%	504	9.64%	5,230
Webster	5,529	64.96%	2,982	35.04%	2,547	29.92%	8,511
Worth	921	55.65%	734	44.35%	187	11.30%	1,655
Wright	4,687	70.38%	1,973	29.62%	2,714	40.76%	6,660
Totals	1,274,188	60.02%	848,583	39.98%	425,605	20.04%	2,122,771

==== Counties that flipped from Democratic to Republican ====
- Boone
- Buchanan
- Dunklin
- Howard
- Iron
- Monroe
- New Madrid
- Pemiscot
- Ralls
- Ray
- Ste Genevieve
- Shannon

=== By congressional district ===
Reagan won seven of nine congressional districts, including four that elected a Democrat.

District	Reagan	Mondale	Representative
1st	37%	63%	Bill Clay
2nd	66%	34%	Robert A. Young
3rd	65%	35%	Dick Gephardt
4th	67%	33%	Ike Skelton
5th	46%	54%	Alan Wheat
6th	61%	39%	Tom Coleman
7th	69%	31%	Gene Taylor
8th	61%	39%	Bill Emerson
9th	64%	36%	Harold Volkmer

== See also ==
- United States presidential elections in Missouri
- Presidency of Ronald Reagan
