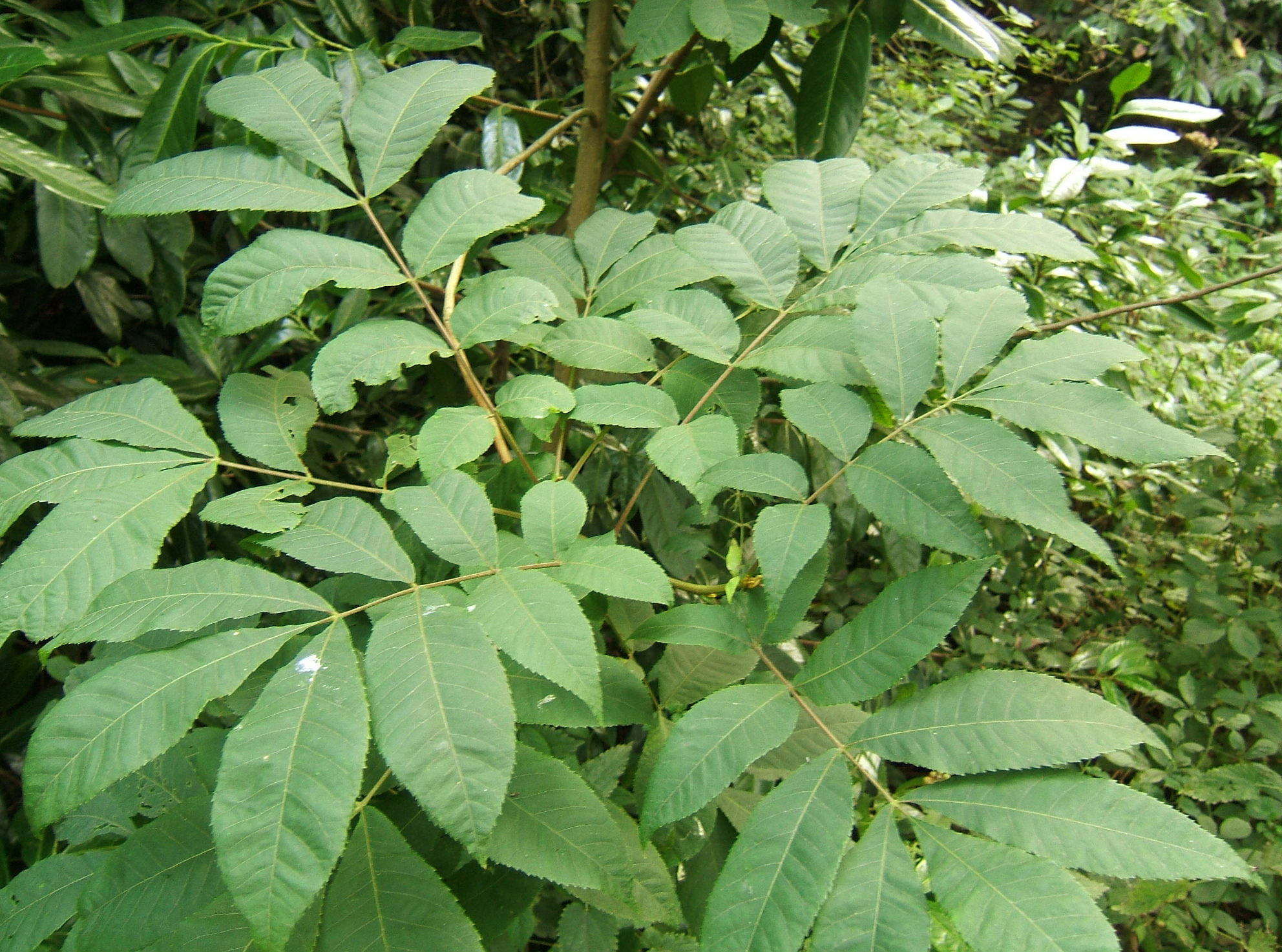
- Bitternut hickory foliage

Conservation status
- Least Concern (IUCN 3.1)

- Secure (NatureServe)

Scientific classification
- Kingdom: Plantae
- Clade: Tracheophytes
- Clade: Angiosperms
- Clade: Eudicots
- Clade: Rosids
- Order: Fagales
- Family: Juglandaceae
- Genus: Carya
- Section: Carya sect. Apocarya
- Species: C. cordiformis

Binomial name
- Carya cordiformis (Wangenh.) K.Koch
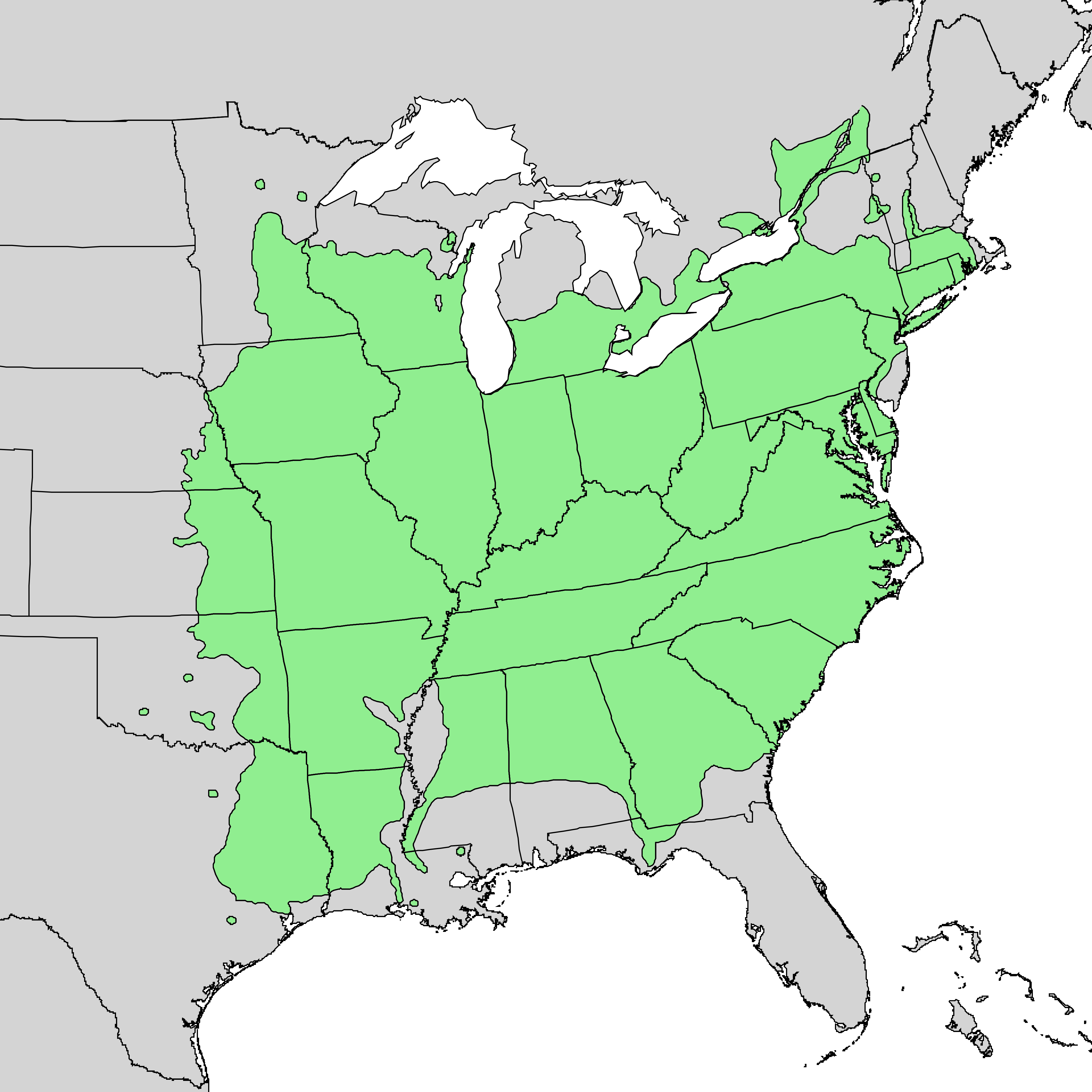
- Natural range

= Carya cordiformis =

Bitternut hickory

Species of tree

Carya cordiformis, the bitternut hickory, also called bitternut, yellowbud hickory, or swamp hickory, is a large hickory species native to the eastern United States and adjacent Canada. Notable for its unique sulphur-yellow buds, it is one of the most widespread hickories and is the northernmost species of pecan hickory (Carya sect. Apocarya). It is the shortest-lived of the hickories, living to about 200 years.

== Etymology ==
The genus name Carya is Ancient Greek: κάρυον, káryon, meaning "nut". The species name cordiformis is from Latin: cor ("heart") + -iform ("shaped"), referring to how the nuts somewhat resemble a heart.

The common name "hickory" derives from a clipping of the native Algonquian (perhaps Powhatan) word pockerchicory, pocohicora, or something else similar which may be the name for the hickory tree's nut, or may be a milky drink made from such nuts.

== Description ==
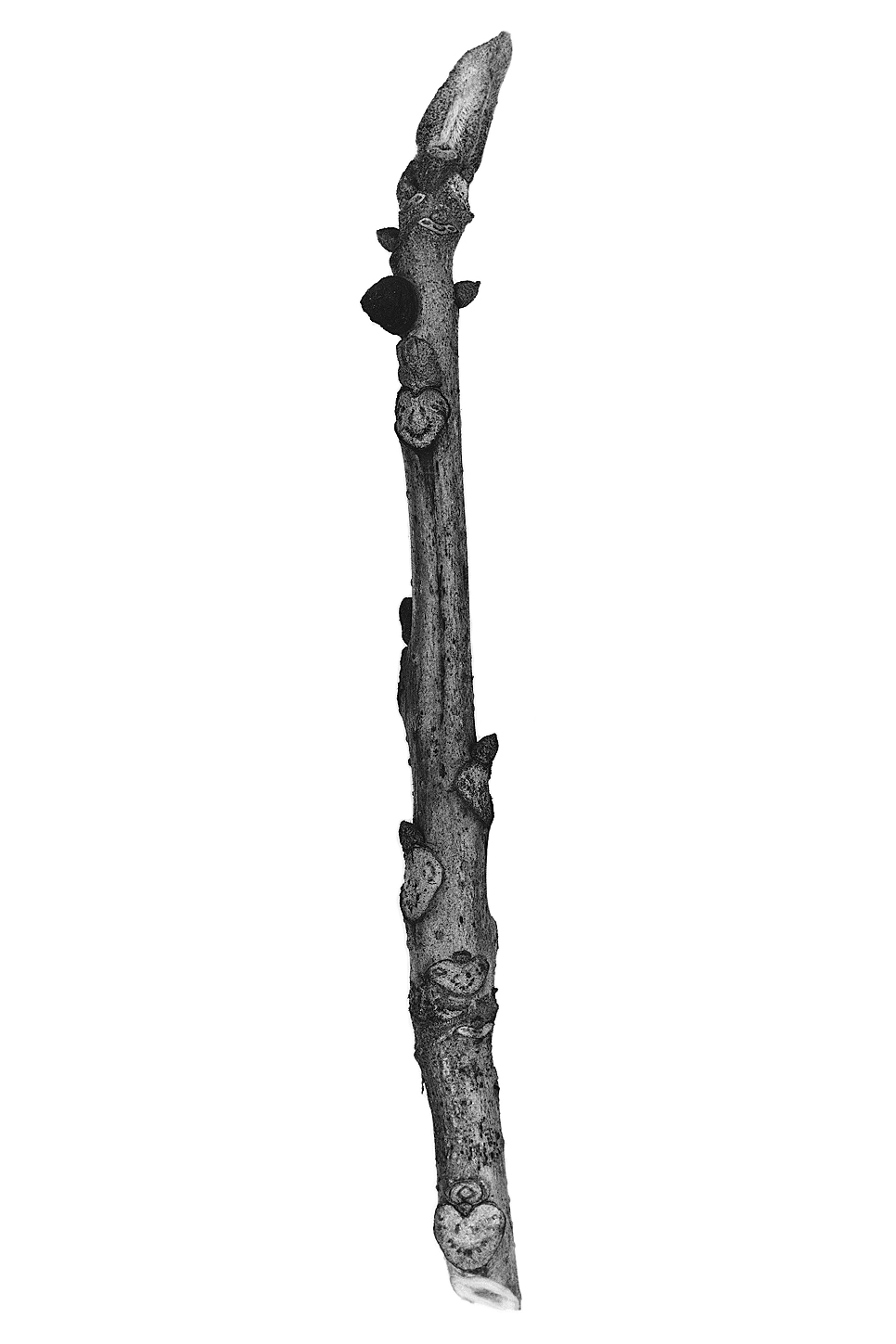
Twig of a bitternut

It is a large deciduous tree, growing up to 35 m (115 ft) tall (reported exceptionally to 51 m or 166 ft), with a trunk up to 1 m (3 ft 3 in) diameter. The leaves are 15–30 cm (6–12 in) long, pinnate, with 7–11 leaflets, each leaflet lanceolate, 7 1/2–15 1/4 cm (3–6 in) long and sessile, though the apical leaflets sometimes possess a short petiolule. The leaflets have serrated margins and are somewhat pubescent on their underside. The flowers are small wind-pollinated catkins, produced in spring. The fruit is a very bitter nut, 2–3.5 cm (3/4–1 1/2 in) long with a green four-valved cover which splits off at maturity in the fall, and a hard, bony shell. Another identifying characteristic is its bright sulfur-yellow winter bud.

It is closely related to the pecan, sharing similar leaf shape and being classified in the same section of the genus Carya sect. Apocarya, but unlike the pecan, it does not have edible nuts. It is most readily distinguished from the pecan by the smaller number of leaflets, with many leaves having only seven leaflets (rarely fewer than 9, and as many as 17, in the pecan). Hybrids with the pecan are known, and named Carya × brownii. A hybrid between the shagbark hickory (C. ovata) is also recognized, and is known as Laney's hickory (Carya × laneyi).

== Habitat ==
Bitternut hickory grows in moist mountain valleys along streambanks and in swamps. Although it is usually found on wet bottom lands, it grows on dry sites and also grows well on poor soils low in nutrients. The species is not included as a titled species in the Society of American Foresters forest cover types because it does not grow in sufficient numbers.

== Range ==
Bitternut hickory grows throughout the eastern United States from southwestern New Hampshire, Vermont, Maine, and southern Quebec; west to southern Ontario, central Michigan, and northern Minnesota; south to eastern Texas; and east to northwestern Florida and Georgia. It is most common, however, from southern New England west to Iowa and from southern Michigan south to Kentucky. It is probably the most abundant and most uniformly distributed of all the hickories. It is most commonly found in the Southern Appalachian Mountains, in high elevations.

== Taxonomy ==
The taxon was first described in 1787 as Juglans cordiformis by Friedrich Adam Julius von Wangenheim, and was transferred to the genus, Carya, in 1869 by Karl Koch.

== Uses ==
Bitternut is used for lumber and pulpwood. Commercial stands are located mostly north of the other pecan hickories. Bitternut hickory is cut and sold in mixture with the "true" hickories. Because bitternut hickory wood is hard and durable, it is used for furniture, paneling, dowels, tool handles and ladders. Like other hickories, the wood is used for smoking meat, and by Native Americans for making bows. Bitternut hickory seeds are eaten by rabbits, and both its seeds and bark are eaten by other wildlife.

The tannins which give the nuts of bitternut hickory their bitter flavour are not fat soluble. As a result, it is possible to extract an edible oil from the nuts through pressing and separating the tannin containing pulp from the oil. Reportedly, the oil content of bitternut hickories reaches as high as 80%. The oil of bitternut hickory is reputed to have a mild and pleasant flavour, similar to that of pecan oil.

== Genetics ==
Bitternut hickory is a diploid species with two sets of sixteen chromosomes that readily hybridizes with other diploid hickory species with a few named hican varieties available. The pecan variety 'Major' has bitternut alleles at two simple sequence repeat loci indicating a cryptic cross that may also have involved C. ovata.

== Gallery ==
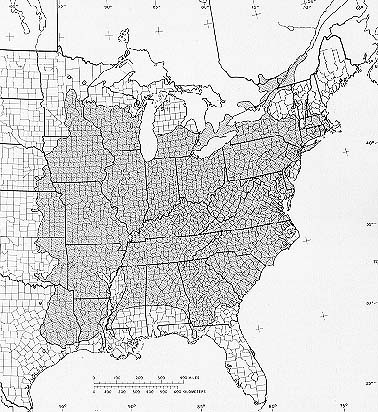
US range map of Carya cordiformis

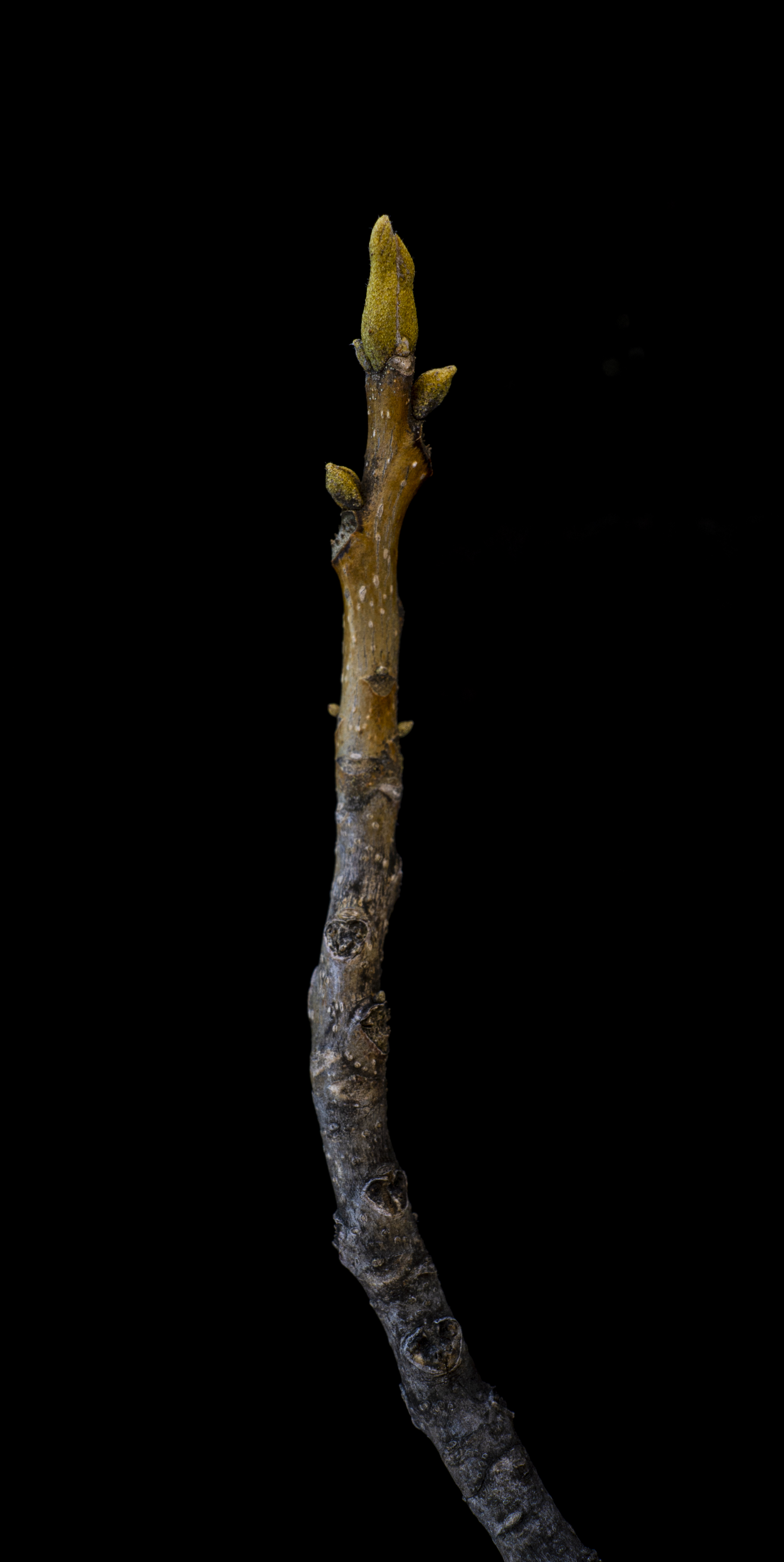
Bud in winter

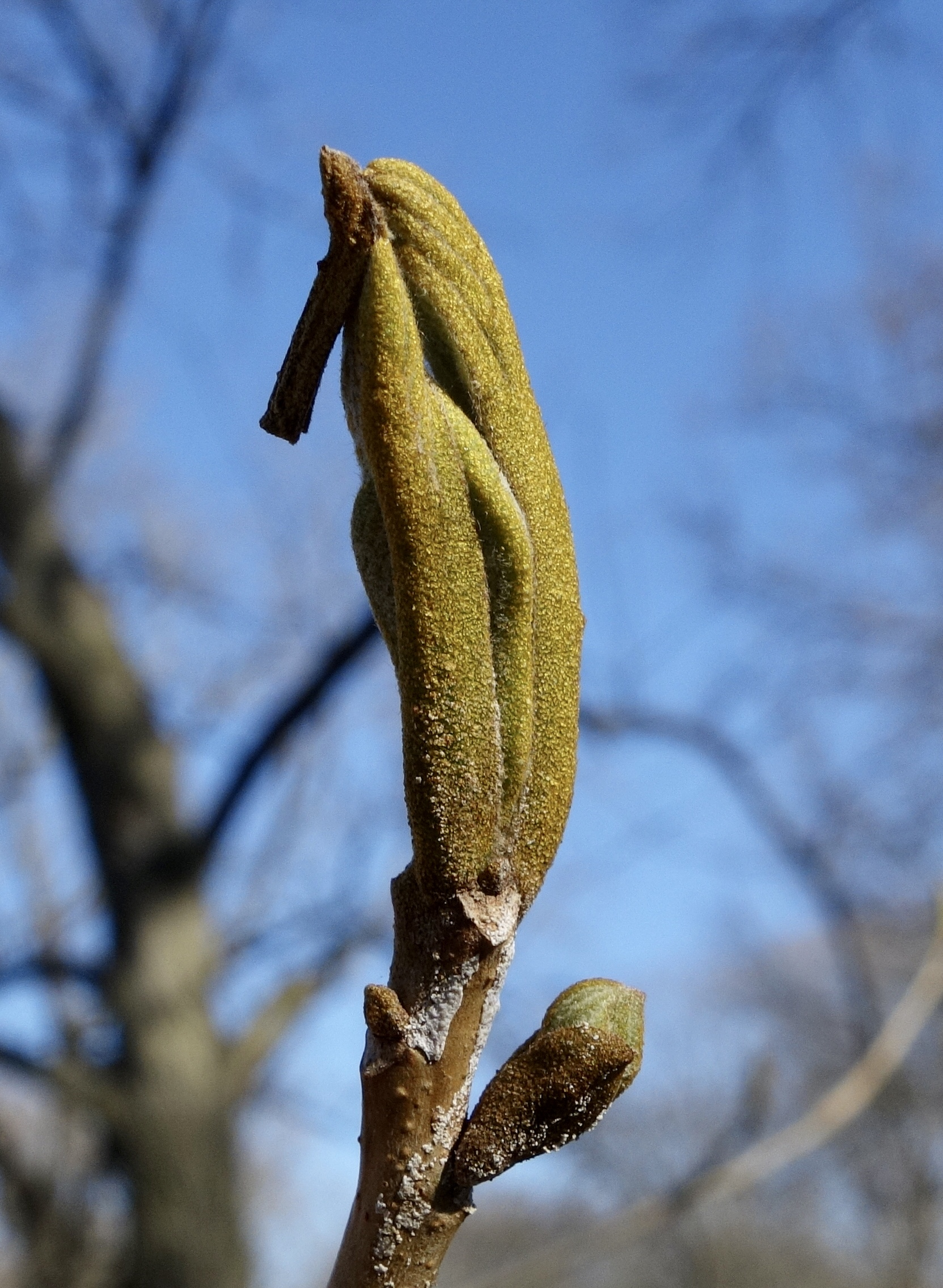
Expanding bud in spring

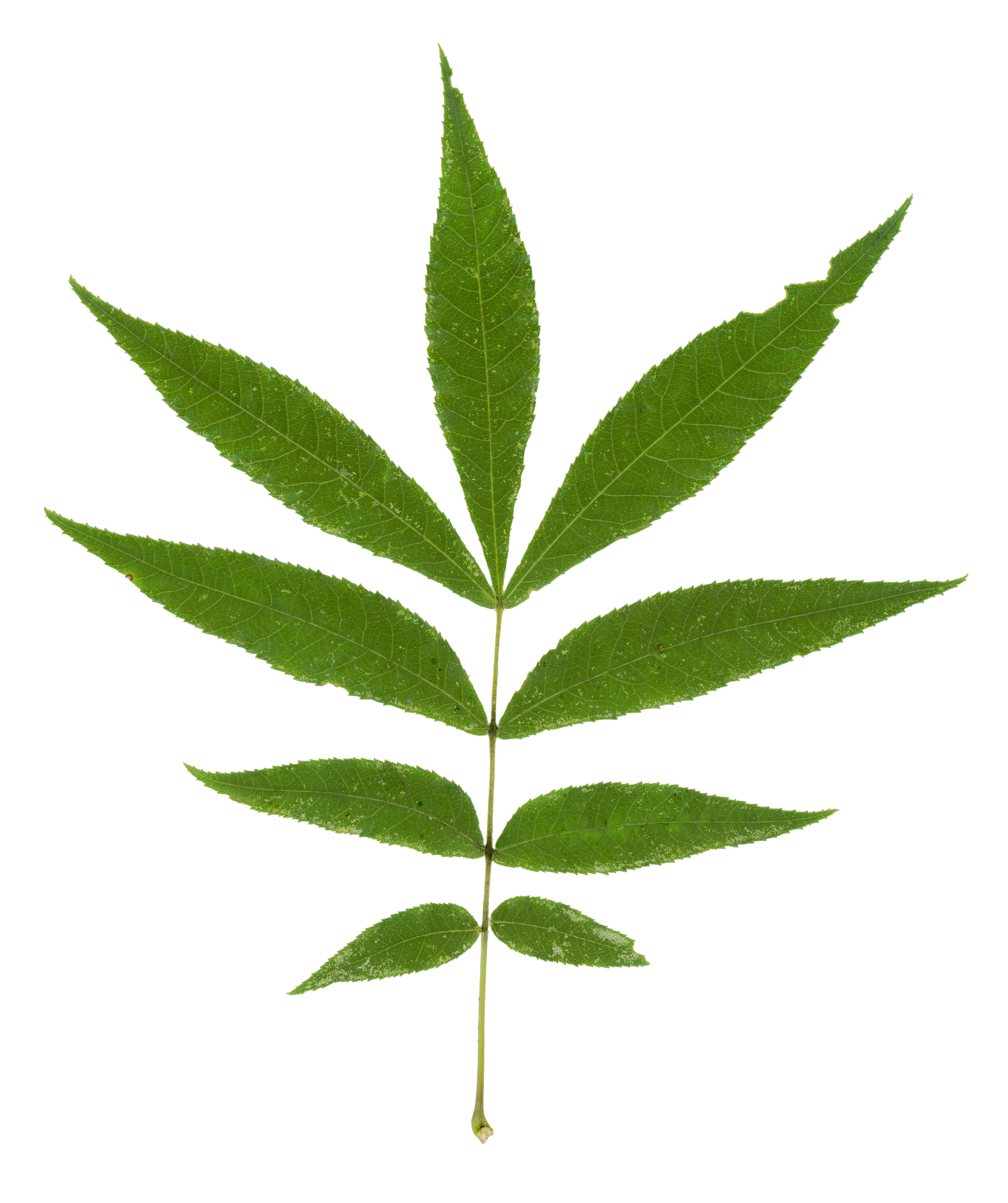
Leaf

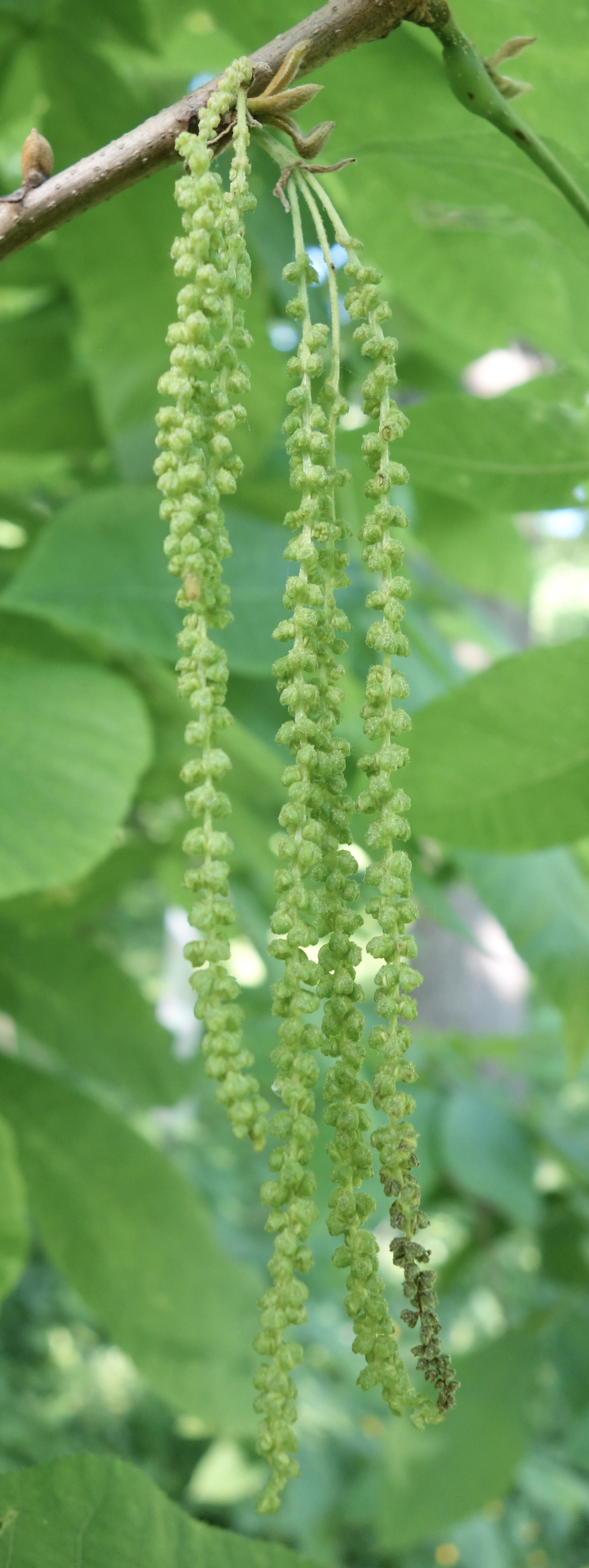
Catkins of male flowers

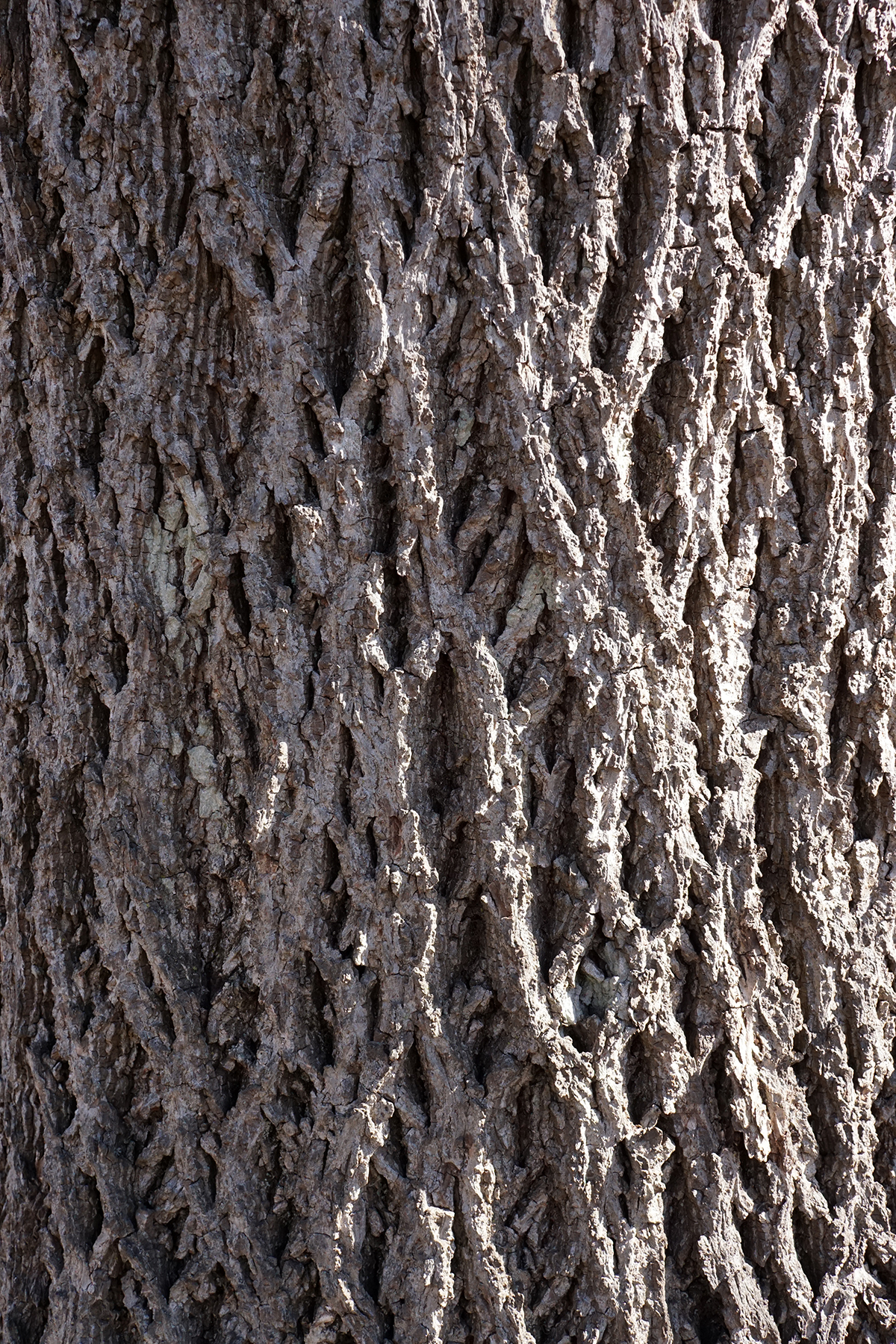
Bark

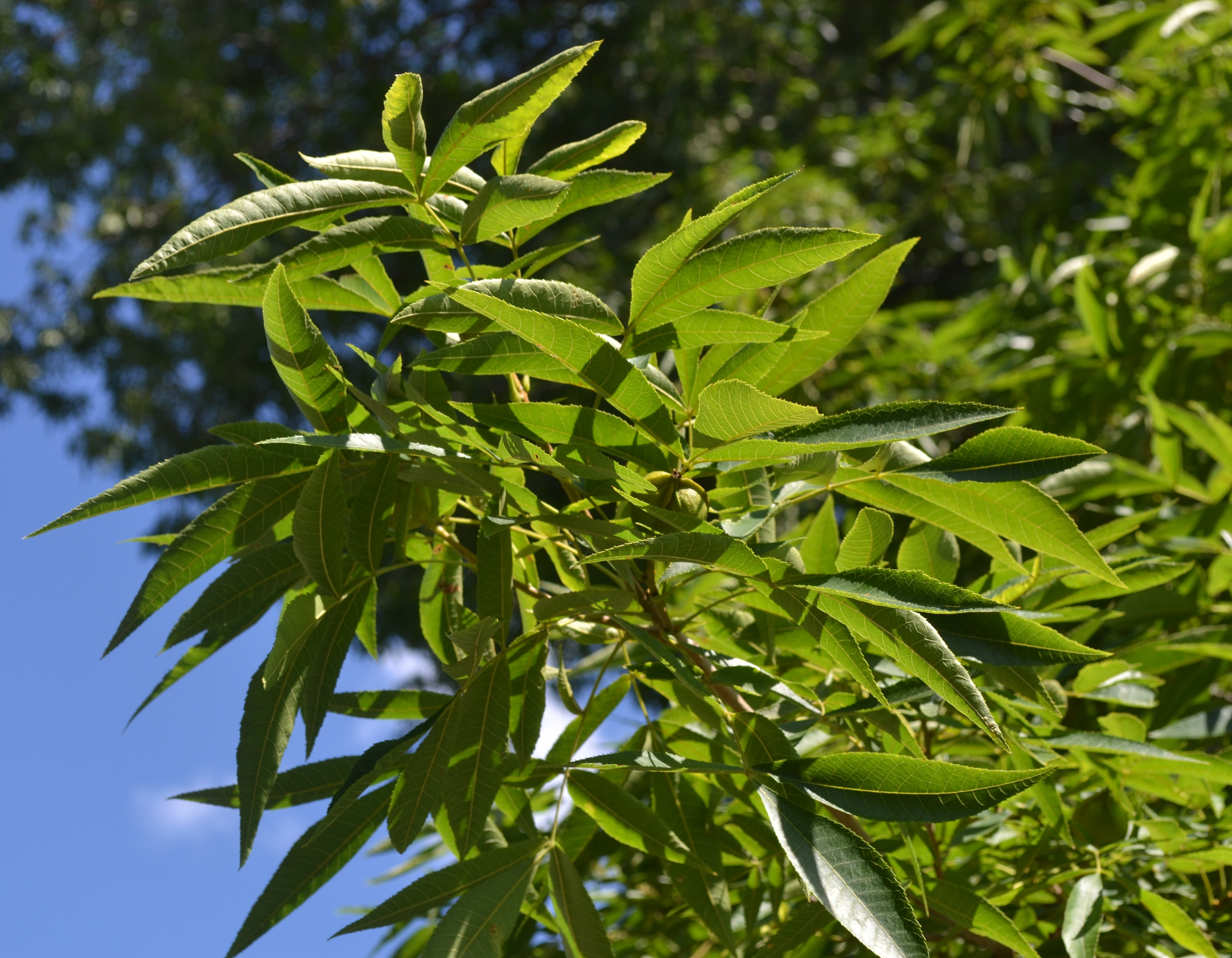
Branch of a bitternut hickory with developing nuts

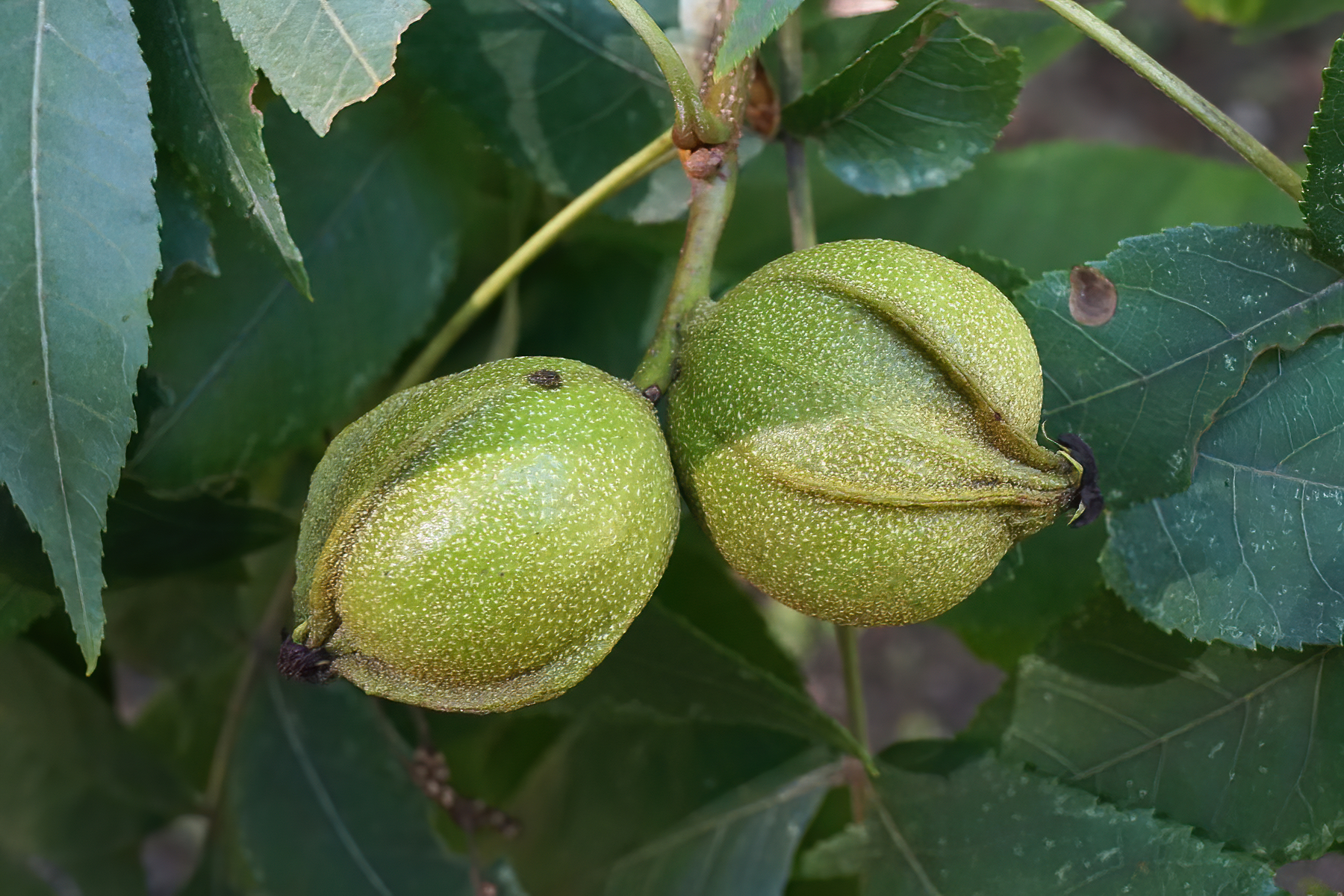
Maturing fruit

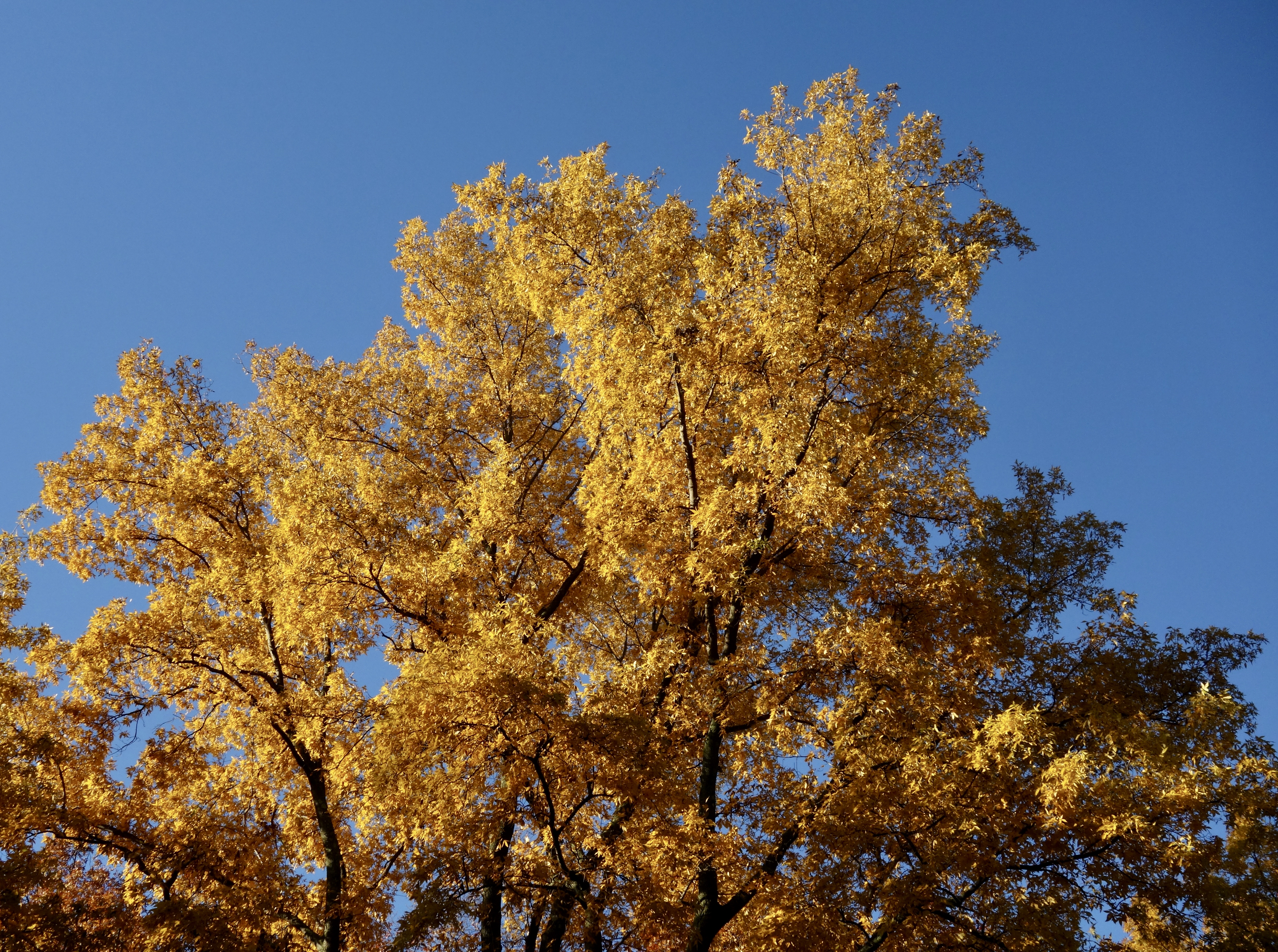
Carya cordiformis, 1940 accession, in fall
