= Butrón (disambiguation) =

Butrón (Basque: Butroeko gaztelua) is a castle located in Gatika, in the province of Biscay, in northern Spain.

Butrón or Butron may also refer to:

- Butrón River, Basque Country, Spain
- Butrón House, noble feudal family of the Crown of Castile
- Butrón (surname)
- Butron Media Corporation, Arkansas, United States

== See also ==
- Burton (disambiguation)
