= Hilldale, Missouri =

Unincorporated community in Missouri, US

Coordinates: 39°03′47″N 92°33′41″W

Hilldale is an unincorporated community in Howard County, in the U.S. state of Missouri.

== History ==
A post office called Hilldale was established in 1894, and remained in operation until 1910. The community was so named on account of hill and dale near the original town site.
