= Lake Burton =

Lake Burton may refer to:

- Lake Burton (Georgia), a lake in Rabun County, Georgia
- Lake Burton (Quebec), a lake near Long Island, Quebec
- Lake Burton (Antarctica)
