= Lisbon, Missouri =

Unincorporated community in Missouri, U.S.

Coordinates: 39°06′23″N 92°54′23″W

Lisbon is an unincorporated community of Howard County in the U.S. state of Missouri. A post office established in 1871 remained until 1906. Both were named after Lisbon, Portugal.
