= Bourton =

Bourton is the name of more than one place in England:

- Bourton, Buckinghamshire
- Bourton, Dorset
- Bourton-on-the-Hill, Gloucestershire
- Bourton-on-the-Water, Gloucestershire
- Bourton, Cherwell, a civil parish in Oxfordshire
  - Great Bourton
- Bourton, Vale of White Horse, Oxfordshire (historically in Berkshire)
- Bourton, Shropshire
- Bourton, North Somerset
- Bourton on Dunsmore, Warwickshire
- Bourton, Wiltshire
- Flax Bourton, Somerset

== See also ==
- Burton (disambiguation)
