= Burton Township =

Burton Township may refer to:

== Canada ==
- Burton Township, Ontario, now part of Whitestone

== United States ==
- Burton Township, Adams County, Illinois
- Burton Township, McHenry County, Illinois
- Burton Township, Yellow Medicine County, Minnesota
- Burton Township, Howard County, Missouri
- Burton Township, Ohio
