= Bruton (disambiguation) =

Bruton is a small town and civil parish in Somerset, England

Bruton may also refer to:

== People ==
- Bruton (surname)
- Bruton Smith

== Places ==
- Bruton, Central Ontario, Canada, in Dysart et al, Ontario
- Bruton Abbey, Somerset, England
- Bruton High School, Virginia, United States
- Bruton Parish Church, Virginia, United States
- Bruton School for Girls, Somerset, England

== Other uses ==
- Bruton, an iguanodon in the 2000 Disney animated film Dinosaur
- Bruton, also known as Pluto, a fictional robot

== See also ==
- Brewton (disambiguation)
- Burton (disambiguation)
