= Steinmetz, Missouri =

Unincorporated community in Missouri, U.S.

Coordinates: 39°14′06″N 92°45′28″W

Steinmetz is an unincorporated community in Howard County, in the U.S. state of Missouri.

== History ==
Steinmetz was platted in 1882. and named after W. P. Steinmetz, the original owner of the town site. A post office called Steinmetz was established in 1879, and remained in operation until 1933.
