= Estill, Missouri =

Unincorporated community in Missouri, U.S.

Estill
- Unincorporated Community
- Location of Estill, MO
- Coordinates: 39°2′54″N 92°44′40″W
- Country: United States
- State: Missouri
- County: Howard
- Post office created: 1877
- Founder: John R. Estill
- Named for: John R. Estill
- Elevation: 669 ft (204 m)
- Time zone: UTC-6 (Central)
- ZIP Code: 65274
- Area code: 660

Estill is an unincorporated community in Howard County, in the U.S. state of Missouri.

== History ==
A post office called Estill was established in 1877, and remained in operation until 1944. The community has the name of James R. Estill, the original owner of the town site.
