= Paint Spring Run =

Paint Spring Run Painter Spring Run
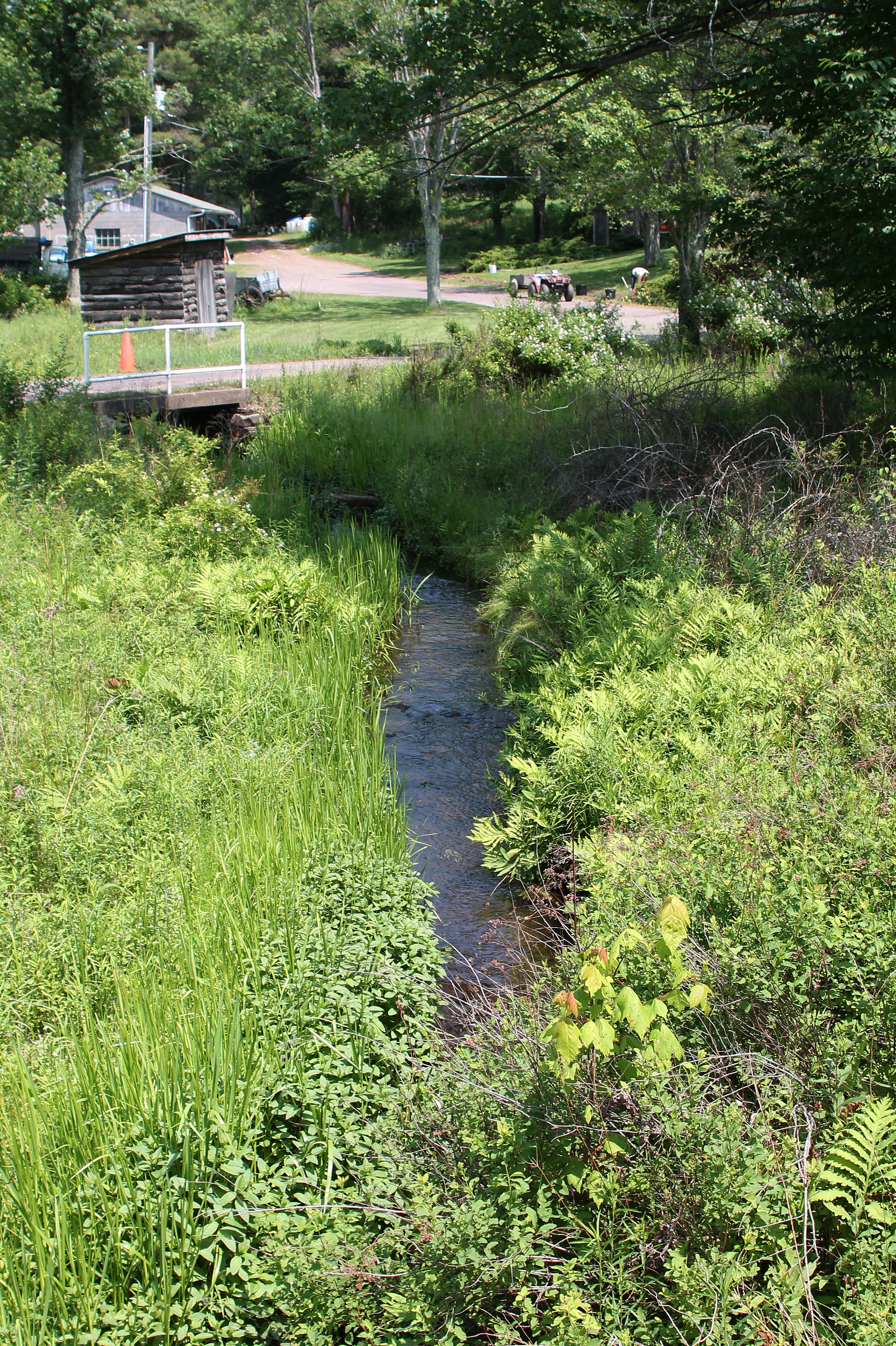
- Paint Spring Run looking upstream

Physical characteristics
- Source
  - location: southeast of Kocher Mountain in Lake Township, Luzerne County, Pennsylvania
  - elevation: between 1,300 and 1,320 feet (400 and 400 m)
- Mouth
  - location: Harveys Creek in Lake Township, Luzerne County, Pennsylvania
  - coordinates: 41°19′11″N 76°04′26″W
  - elevation: 1,102 ft (336 m)
- Length: 3.0 mi (4.8 km)
- Basin size: 2.35 mi^{2} (6.1 km^{2})

Basin features
- Progression: Harveys Creek → Susquehanna River → Chesapeake Bay
- Tributaries
  - right: one unnamed tributary

Paint Spring Run (also known as Painter Spring Run) is a tributary of Harveys Creek in Luzerne County, Pennsylvania, in the United States. It is approximately 3.0 miles (4.8 km) long and flows through Lake Township. The watershed of the stream has an area of 2.35 square miles (6.1 km^{2}). It has one named tributary. Wild trout inhabit Paint Spring Run. Wisconsinan Till, Wisconsinan Bouldery Till, Wisconsinan Ice-Contact Stratified Drift, alluvium, peat bogs, wetlands, and bedrock consisting of sandstone and shale all occur in the surficial geology in the stream's vicinity.

== Course ==
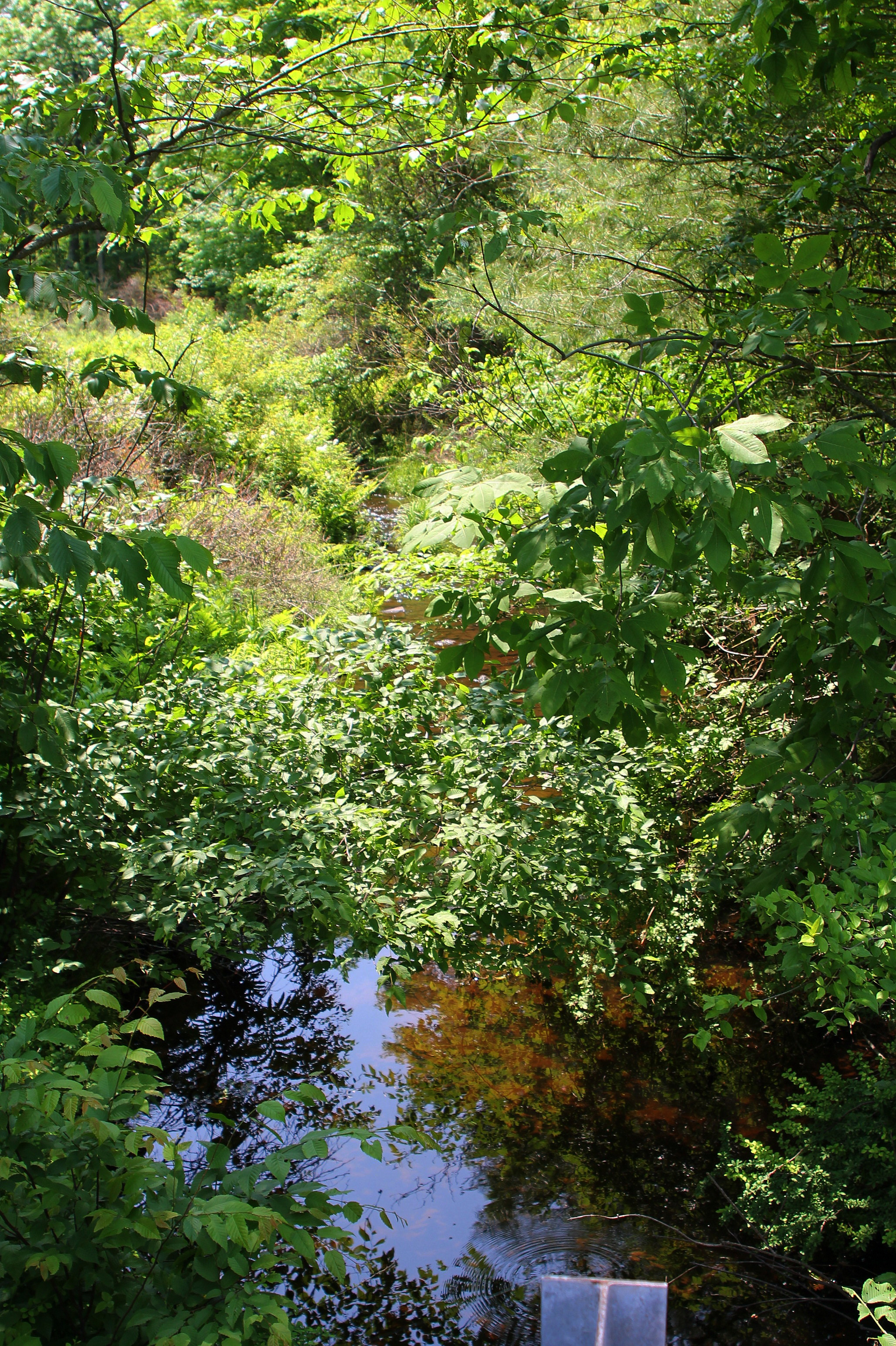
Paint Spring Run looking downstream from Outlet-Loyalville Road

Paint Spring Run begins southeast of Kocher Mountain in Lake Township. It flows southwest for a short distance before turning south and passing through a small lake. The stream then turns south-southeast for more than a mile, passing near the community of Loyalville and flowing through another pond or small lake. The stream then turns nearly due south for several tenths of a mile, passing through a small pond, before receiving an unnamed tributary from the right and turning east. After a short distance, it reaches its confluence with Harveys Creek.

Paint Spring Run joins Harveys Creek 11.42 miles (18.38 km) upstream of its mouth.

=== Tributaries ===
Paint Spring Run has no named tributaries. However, it does have one unnamed tributary. It is approximately 1.0 mile (1.6 km) long and joins Paint Spring Run in its lower reaches.

== Hydrology, geography, and geology ==
Paint Spring Run is not considered to be impaired.

The elevation near the mouth of Paint Spring Run is 1,102 feet (336 m) above sea level. The elevation near the stream's source is between 1,300 and 1,320 feet (400 and 400 m).

During the glacial retreat, channels were carved in the bedrock of a ridge that is a spur to the Allegheny Front. The channels run southwest to a group of channels at the headwaters of Paint Spring Run and Pikes Creek. These channels are lower than those that run to Huntington Creek, but higher than those running to Bear Hollow. The channels are in a large area of Wisconsinan Ice-Contact Stratified Drift.

The surficial geology along Paint Spring Run features alluvium for most of its length. However, glacial or resedimented tills such as Wisconsinan Till and Wisconsinan Bouldery Till also occur near the stream. Patches of Wisconsinan Ice-Contact Stratified Drift, which contains stratified sand and gravel as well as some boulders, occur near its source and mouth. Bedrock consisting of sandstone and shale also occur in the surficial geology not far from the stream. Some patches of peat bog and wetland also occur in the watershed.

== Watershed ==
The watershed of Paint Spring Run has 2.35 square miles (6.1 km^{2}). The stream is entirely within the United States Geological Survey quadrangle of Harveys Lake.

A lake known as Bryant Pond is situated near the mouth of Paint Spring Run on Harveys Creek. Although the stream is a tributary of Harveys Creek, it is instead listed as a tributary of Bear Hollow Creek in the 1921 Water Resources Inventory Report.

== History ==
Paint Spring Run was entered into the Geographic Names Information System on August 2, 1979. Its identifier in the Geographic Names Information System is 1183200.

== Biology ==
Wild trout naturally reproduce in Paint Spring Run for 2.48 miles (3.99 km) of its length.

== See also ==
- Pikes Creek, next tributary of Harveys Creek going downstream
- Bear Hollow Creek, next tributary of Harveys Creek going upstream
