= Brewton =

Brewton may refer to:

== People ==
- DJ Brewton (born 2000), American basketball player in the Israeli Basketball Premier League
- Maia Brewton (born 1977), American actress
- Pete Brewton, American journalist and academic

== Places ==
In the United States

- Brewton, Alabama, a city
- Brewton, Georgia, an unincorporated community
- Brewton, Mississippi, a ghost town

== Other ==
- Brewton Municipal Airport serving Brewton, Alabama
- USS Brewton (FF-1086), a US Navy frigate

== See also ==
- Bruton (disambiguation)
