= Friedrich Adam Julius von Wangenheim =

German botanist (1749–1800)

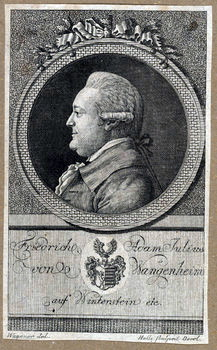
- Born: 7 February 1749; Sonneborn, Saxe-Gotha-Altenburg, Holy Roman Empire
- Died: 25 March 1800 (aged 51); Gusev, Russian Empire
- Scientific career
- Fields: Botany

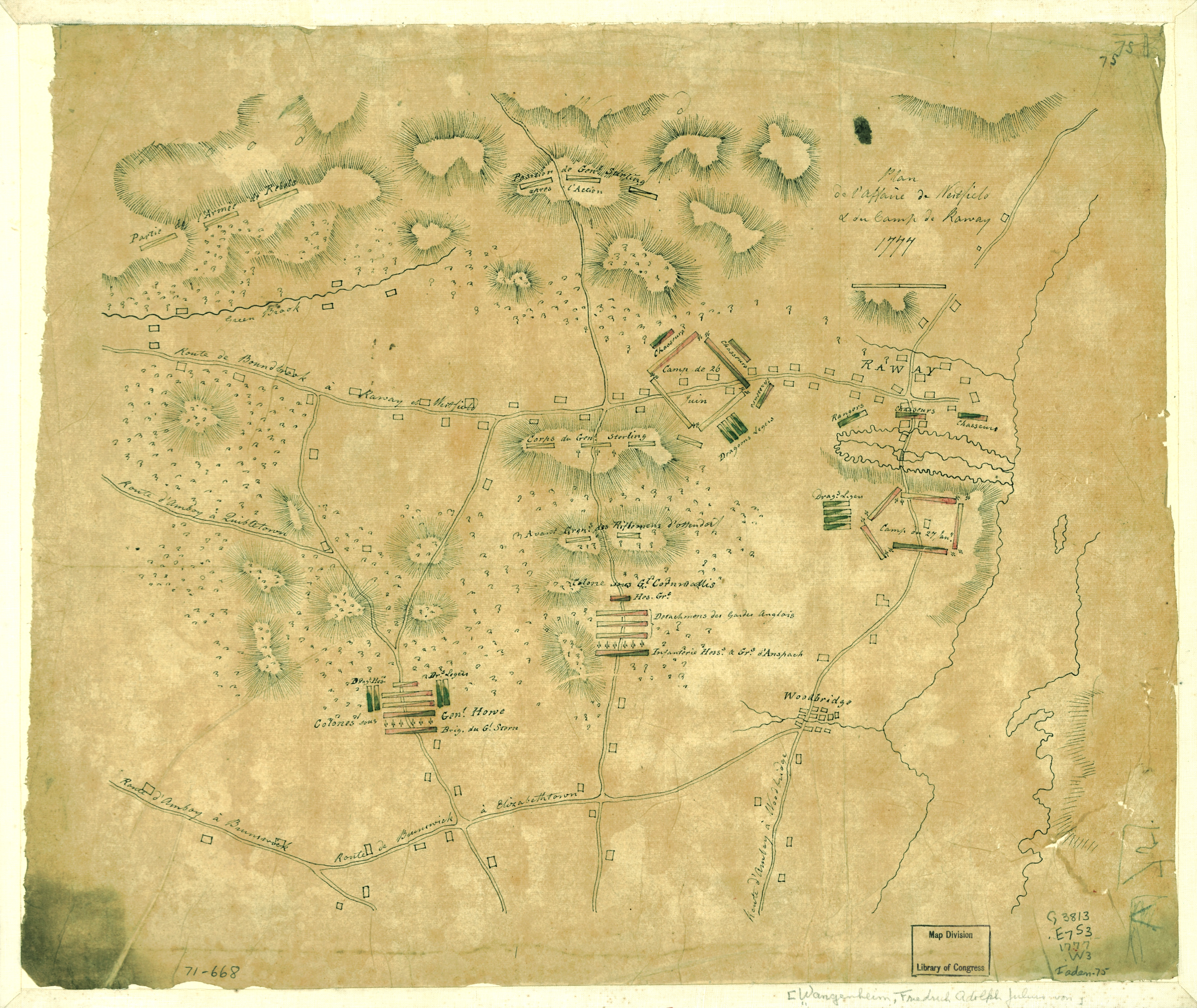
Wangenheim's map of the Battle of Short Hills (1777)

Friedrich Adam Julius von Wangenheim (8 February 1749 Sonneborn – 25 March 1800 Gumbinnen) was a German botanist specializing in forestry, and was the citing authority for a number of described eastern North American plant species. He was also a Hessian soldier, and during his service in the Thirteen Colonies devoted his leisure time to botanical studies of American forests. When he returned to Prussia, he wrote up his research and strongly advocated importing suitable American species of trees and shrubs for use in German forests. The standard author abbreviation Wangenh. is used to indicate this person as the author when citing a botanical name.

== Biography ==
He received his education at Waltershausen, and in 1766 entered the service of the Duke of Coburg as lieutenant. He later entered the Prussian army and attained the rank of captain. He went to the United States in 1777 in the Hessian contingent in the British service, served with the Hesse-Kassel Feld Jaegerkorps in New York and Pennsylvania 1778-1783 ultimately as Stabskapitän, and won a commendable reputation. He participated in the battles of Brandywine, Charleston and attack on New London, Connecticut. On his return to Germany he was given the cross of the Hessian military order, and later re-entered the Prussian service.

While in North America, he had studied the natural history of the country, especially the trees and shrubs. In 1785, he wrote a memoir to the Berlin Academy showing the immense advantages that would be derived from the naturalization of several species of American trees. On request of the academy, he was then sent to Gumbinnen as director general of the waters and forests of eastern Prussia, where he carried on experiments on a large scale and planted a great number of American trees.

== Works ==
- Beschreibung einiger Arten von Bäumen die in Nordamerika wachsen, mit Bezug auf ihren Gebrauch in den deutschen Wäldern, nach den Beobachtungen in den nordamerikanischen Provinzen von 1778-1783 (Description of some species of trees that grow in North America with regard to their use in German forests, based on observations in the North American colonies 1778–1783; Göttingen, 1781)
- Supplement zur Wälder-Kultur-Wissenschaft, mit Anwendung auf die Umpflanzung der Baumarten die in Nordamerika wachsen (Addendum to forestry science with application to the transplantation of North American tree species; 1787)
- Beschreibung der verschiedenen Holzarten die in Nordamerika wachsen (Description of various species of trees that grow in North America; 1788)
- Betrachtungen über die Tannen von Preussisch-Litthauen (Observations on firs of Prussian Lithuania; 1789)
- Betrachtungen über die Weichhölzer die in Nordamerika wachsen (Observations on softwoods that grow in North America; 1795)

He also published several memoirs in the Transactions of the Berlin Academy of Sciences.
