= Burton, Arizona =

- Populated place
- Location within the state of Arizona Burton, Arizona (the United States)
- Coordinates: 34°19′56″N 110°08′52″W
- Country: United States
- State: Arizona
- County: Navajo
- Elevation: 6,109 ft (1,862 m)
- Time zone: UTC-7 (Mountain (MST))
  - Summer (DST): UTC-7 (MST)
- Area code: 928
- FIPS code: 04-08620
- GNIS feature ID: 27058

Burton is a populated place situated in Navajo County, Arizona, United States.
