= Sebree, Missouri =

Unincorporated community in Missouri, U.S.

Coordinates: 39°07′37″N 92°31′52″W

Sebree is an unincorporated community in Howard County, in the U.S. state of Missouri.

== History ==
A post office called Sebree was established in 1872, and remained in operation until 1899. The community has the name of the local Sebree family.
