= Bunker Hill, Howard County, Missouri =

Unincorporated community in Missouri, U.S.

Coordinates: 39°13′05″N 92°31′51″W

Bunker Hill is an unincorporated community in Howard County, in the U.S. state of Missouri.

== History ==
The community was named in commemoration of the Battle of Bunker Hill. The post office at Bunker Hill was called Myers, after Henry Myers, a pioneer citizen. The Myers post office was established in 1859, and remained in operation until 1905.
