= Lake Burton (Quebec) =

Lake in Quebec, Canada

- Location within Quebec
- Location: Baie-James, Quebec
- Coordinates: 54°45′N 78°20′W
- Basin countries: Canada

Lake Burton (Lac Burton) is a lake in western Quebec, Canada, approximately 15 kilometres from Long Island, Nunavut in Hudson Bay.
