= Hican =

Hybrid of pecan and another type of hickory

A hican is a tree resulting from a cross between a pecan and some other type of hickory (members of the genus Carya) - or the nut from such a hybrid tree.

Such crosses often occur naturally while most such hybrids produce unfilled nuts or have other serious flaws. Some have desirable qualities from both species and are propagated commercially for nut production. Their properties vary greatly with the particular ancestral species of hickory. Some produce very desirable nuts with a flavor said to be similar to the better types of hickory nuts (not all hickories produce palatable nuts) but far easier to shell.

== Varieties ==
An older hican variety, 'James' (C. illinoiensis X C. laciniosa), from Missouri, was propagated and sold by a national nursery, giving it wide distribution. Unfortunately, it has been an erratic producer in most locations. One of the best-tasting hican nuts is the 'Burton', which is round and thin in shape.
