= Burton, Northumberland =

Hamlet in Northumberland, England

Coordinates: 55.595°N 1.724°W

Burton
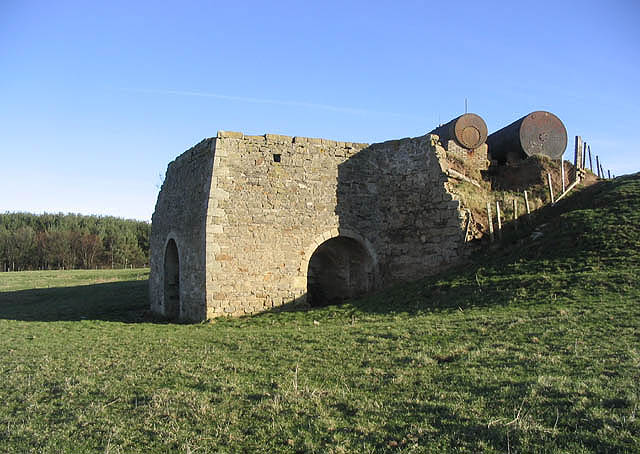
- Old kiln near Burton Quarry

- Location within Northumberland
- OS grid reference: NU175335
- Civil parish: Bamburgh
- Unitary authority: Northumberland
- Ceremonial county: Northumberland
- Region: North East
- Country: England
- Sovereign state: United Kingdom
- Post town: BAMBURGH
- Postcode district: NE69
- Dialling code: 01668
- Police: Northumbria
- Fire: Northumberland
- Ambulance: North East
- UK Parliament: Berwick-upon-Tweed

Burton is a hamlet in the civil parish of Bamburgh, in the county of Northumberland, England. It is situated to the south of the village of Bamburgh, a short distance inland from the North Sea coast.

== Governance ==
Burton is in the parliamentary constituency of Berwick-upon-Tweed. Burton was historically a township in the ancient parish of Bambrough, in 1866, the legal definition of 'parish' was changed to be the areas used for administering the poor laws, and so Burton became a civil parish. On 1 April 1955 the civil parish was merged into Bamburgh. In 1951 the civil parish had a population of 60.
