= Burton (nut) =

Burton is a cultivar of hican (nut or tree), a cross between hickory and pecan, species of the genus Carya. Burton nuts have a unique, yet very pleasing hickory flavor indicative of hickory trees. Hickory-pecan hybrids are often unproductive.
