= Sonneborn =

- Municipality
- Coat of arms

- Location of Sonneborn within Gotha district
- Interactive map of Sonneborn
- Location within Germany Location within Thuringia
- Coordinates: 51°0′N 10°35′E
- Country: Germany
- State: Thuringia
- District: Gotha

Government
  - Mayor (2022–28): Jürgen Fleischhauer

Area
  - Total: 16.47 km^{2} (6.36 sq mi)
- Elevation: 260 m (850 ft)

Population (2025-12-31)
  - Total: 1,242
  - Density: 75.41/km^{2} (195.3/sq mi)
- Time zone: UTC+01:00 (CET)
  - Summer (DST): UTC+02:00 (CEST)
- Postal codes: 32683
- Dialling codes: 05263
- Vehicle registration: GTH
- Website: www.gemeinde-sonneborn.de

Sonneborn (German pronunciation: [ˈzɔnəbɔʁn]) is a municipality in the district of Gotha, in Thuringia, Germany.
