= Burton, Prince Edward Island =

Coordinates: 46.770°N 64.333°W

Location of Burton in Prince Edward Island

Burton is a settlement in the western portion of Prince Edward Island.
