= Butrón (surname) =

Butrón is a Spanish surname. Notable people with this surname include:

- Jahir Butrón Gotuzzo (born 1975), Peruvian footballer
- Leao Butrón Gotuzzo (born 1977), Peruvian footballer
- Francisco Antonio de Lorenzana y Butrón (1722 – 1804), Catholic Cardinal, also served as Archbishop of Mexico
- Gabriel Gregorio Fernando José María García Moreno y Morán de Butrón (1821 – 1875), Ecuadorian politician, twice President of Ecuador
- Gaby López (Maria Gabriela López Butron, born 1993), Mexican professional golfer
- Gerardo Esquivel Butrón, Mexican retired football midfielder
- Ulises Butrón, Agrentinian musician, singer, and music producer

== See also ==
- Butrón House, noble feudal family of the Crown of Castile
