= Little Dixie (Missouri) =

Region of Missouri

Coordinates: 39°N 93°W

Little Dixie is a historic 13- to 17-county region along the Missouri River in central Missouri, United States. Its early Anglo-American settlers were largely migrants from the hemp and tobacco districts of Virginia, Kentucky, and Tennessee. They brought enslaved African Americans with them or purchased them as workers in the region. Because Southerners settled there first, the pre-Civil War culture of the region was similar to that of the Upper South. The area was also known as Boonslick country.

A 1948 article in the Missouri Historical Review defined the antebellum "Little Dixie" region as a 13-county area between the Mississippi River north of St. Louis to Missouri River counties in the central part of the state (Audrain, Boone, Callaway, Chariton, Howard, Lincoln, Pike, Marion, Monroe, Ralls, Randolph, Saline, and Shelby counties).

When the Southerners migrated to Missouri, they brought their cultural, social, agricultural, architectural, political and economic practices, including slavery. Overall, Missouri's slave population represented 10 percent of the state's population in the 1860 U.S. Census. But in Little Dixie, county and township slave populations ranged from 20 to 50 percent by 1860, with the highest percentages for the counties developed for large plantations along the Missouri river. New Madrid County, along the Mississippi River south of St. Louis, also had a high percentage of enslaved Africans, but was not considered part of the region.

== Definition ==
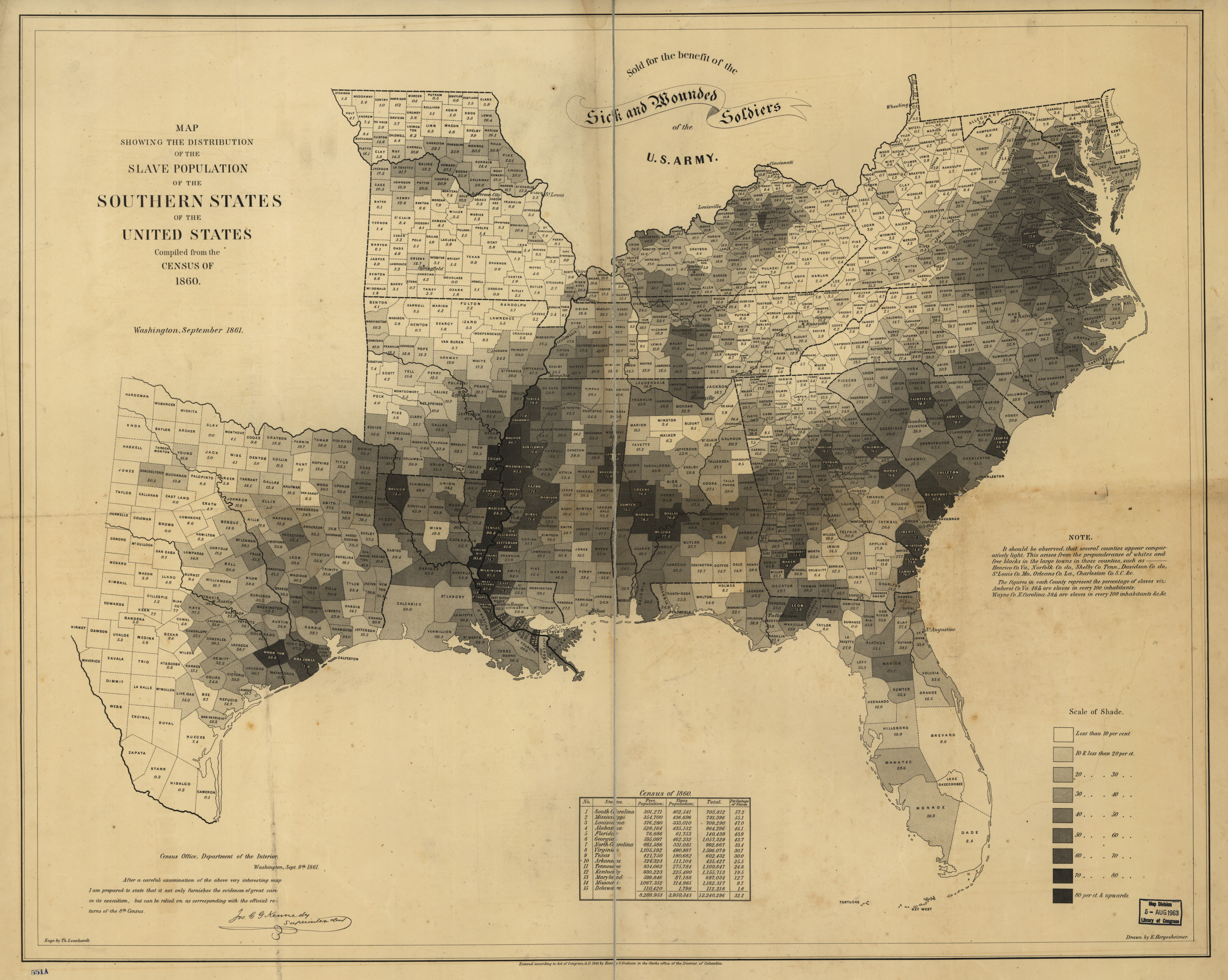
Percentage of slaves by county in the slave states in 1860. Little Dixie's isolation from the core slaveholding regions of the South is apparent.

While definitions of the counties included in Little Dixie vary, in 1860 seven counties were developed primarily for plantations, and their populations consisted of 25 percent or more enslaved African Americans:

- Callaway
- Boone
- Howard County
- Saline County
- Chariton County
- Lafayette County
- Clay County.

The only other county of the state where the enslaved population was as high in 1860 was New Madrid in the Bootheel, a region in the southern part of the state along the Mississippi River that was devoted to cotton plantations.

The major cash crop was hemp and tobacco. In Lafayette County, locals declared hemp as king and dedicated all agricultural production to it, while foregoing necessary food production. In addition, planters in "Outer Little Dixie" counties, such as Platte, Howard, Chariton and Ralls, grew millions of pounds of tobacco on large plantations with 20 or more slaves. Some farmers and planters grew cotton and sent their surplus down the Missouri River to St. Louis, and down the Mississippi to New Orleans. Cotton was exported to Britain, or shipped north to textile mills in New York and New England.

In Howard County, developed along the river for plantations, planters named their large estates in the Southern style, such as Greenwood, Redstone, Oakwood and Sylvan Villa. On these plantations, slave populations ranged between 15 and 70 people; they cultivated acreage of 500 acres (2 km^{2}) to 2000 acres (8 km^{2}), or more.

== Postwar history ==
After the Civil War, the slaves were emancipated. The Reconstruction-era legislature established free public education for all citizens for the first time. While whites insisted that schools be segregated, the legislature required that all townships with 20 or more black children of student age had to establish schools. By 1870, of the former slave states, Missouri had the "largest proportion of schools for negro children." Black communities rapidly established independent churches and schools to express their own culture and create a sphere outside white supervision.

In Little Dixie in the early 20th century, of the counties with the largest black populations,

Callaway County at one time had twenty-eight African American schools; Boone, eighteen; Howard, sixteen; Cooper, twenty-six; Chariton, fourteen; Lafayette, twenty; Saline, eighteen. Although the number of schools decreased as rural black communities dissolved with the onslaught of the Depression and the economic opportunity of the New Deal, in 1933 these same counties still had the highest number of black schools outside of St. Louis and the Bootheel.

In keeping with competition and fears among whites, they exercised a higher frequency of mob violence against blacks and lynchings of African Americans in this region than in other parts of the state. The pattern appears to be strongly associated with the history of slavery, the rural economy after the war, and white efforts to establish dominance in resulting race relations. In the late 19th-century white Democrats throughout the South sought to reimpose and maintain white supremacy. Between 1889 and 1919, a period that is considered the "nadir of racial relations" in the United States, Southern states disenfranchised most blacks through new constitutions and amendments. Lynchings of black men were numerous in the South in this period.

In 1890 in the traditional seven counties of Little Dixie, the black population totaled 45,000. It increased into the early 20th century. In the "nadir" period, there were 13 lynchings of black men in total in Boone, Howard, Monroe, Pike, and Randolph counties. This number represented 16 percent of the total lynchings in the state during this period, whereas these seven counties contained less than 6 percent of the state's total population. African Americans comprised slightly more than 50 percent of the victims of lynching in other parts of Missouri. In these seven counties, more than 90 percent of lynch victims were black, and they were overwhelmingly men.

Mechanization of farms decreased the need for farm labor beginning in the early 20th century. African Americans left the region in the Great Migration for northern and midwestern industrial cities, including St. Louis. They also sought to escape the violence and social oppression. The United States Supreme Court ruling of Brown v. Board of Education (1954) declared segregated public schools to be unconstitutional, but integration of schools was slow in many areas of the South and Missouri. After integration, some former black schools were closed and adapted for new uses; others were in too poor condition to be used.

The Little Dixie Conference, an athletic conference for high schools in Callaway, Audrain, and Boone counties, operated from 1952 to 2006.

In many parts of Little Dixie, some antebellum plantation homes still stand today. Many people participate in heritage tourism and historic projects to preserve these structures and other aspects of this era.

Other aspects of the region's complex history, including after the Civil War, are also being studied and preserved. Beginning in 1998, the State Historic Preservation Office (of the Department of Natural Resources), conducted a survey to identify the remaining historic African-American schools in the 15 counties of Little Dixie; this survey was extended throughout the state and lasted until 2002. The study documented the historic structures, identifying those that were unique architecturally. It also captured the stories of people associated with them. The team conducted many oral interviews with former students, teachers, administrators and members of the communities to learn about their communities during the Jim Crow era. Because many of the former rural schools consisted of just one room, they have been adapted for a wide variety of uses. Many have survived. In addition, schools were often started in black churches or chapels, many of which still stand. As a result of the study, the state recommended numerous African-American schools for nomination to the National Register of Historic Places.

Continuing demographic changes throughout the 20th century have resulted in a decrease in the number and proportion of African Americans in most of the seven counties of Little Dixie. Only Boone County in 2010 had an increase in African-American population since 2000. Blacks made up 9.29 percent of the population. In each of the other six counties, African Americans made up 6 percent or less of total population. In each case, the number and proportion of blacks in the population had declined since 2000.
