= Burton Township, McHenry County, Illinois =

Coordinates: 42°27′27″N 88°13′13″W

Burton Township
- Township
- Location in McHenry County
- Country: United States
- State: Illinois
- County: McHenry
- Established: November 6, 1849

Area
  - Total: 10.87 sq mi (28.2 km^{2})
  - Land: 10.79 sq mi (27.9 km^{2})
  - Water: 0.08 sq mi (0.21 km^{2}) 0.74%

Population (2020)
  - Total: 4,820
  - Density: 463.5/sq mi (179.0/km^{2})
- Time zone: UTC-6 (CST)
  - Summer (DST): UTC-5 (CDT)
- FIPS code: 17-111-10032
- Website: http://www.burtontwp.com/

Burton Township is the smallest of 17 townships in McHenry County, Illinois. As of the 2020 census, its population was 4,820 and it contained 1,858 housing units.

Burton Township was first settled by Englishmen in 1836 who gave it the name English Prairie. Later settlers called the township Benton, but after learning that there already was a post office and township of Benton in southern Illinois, the name was changed to Burton on December 28, 1850. Burton Township is unusually small because its first residents broke from Richmond Township to its west. The reason for this was a "Hatfields vs. McCoys" type of feud in the 1840s over alleged township mismanagement and higher taxes in Richmond. The Burton settlers opted out and even tried to have adjoining Lake County absorb them into its eastern neighbor, Antioch Township, but Antioch Township had just consolidated Cooper Township into itself, and since Burton Township was situated in another county, a special law needed to be passed in Springfield to affect that change.

== Geography ==
According to the 2010 census, the township has a total area of 10.87 square miles (28.2 km^{2}), of which 10.79 square miles (27.9 km^{2}) (or 99.26%) is land and 0.08 square miles (0.21 km^{2}) (or 0.74%) is water.

== Demographics ==
Historical population
Census	Pop.	Note	%±
2010	5,003		—
2020	4,820		−3.7%
U.S. Decennial Census
