= Burton, Missouri =

Unincorporated community in Missouri, U.S.

Coordinates: 39.2147567°N 92.6121258°W

Burton is an unincorporated community in Howard County, in the U.S. state of Missouri.

== History ==
A post office called Burton was established in 1873, and remained in operation until 1935. The community has the name of Prior Burton, the original owner of the site.
