= Howard County, Missouri =

County in Missouri, United States

- County
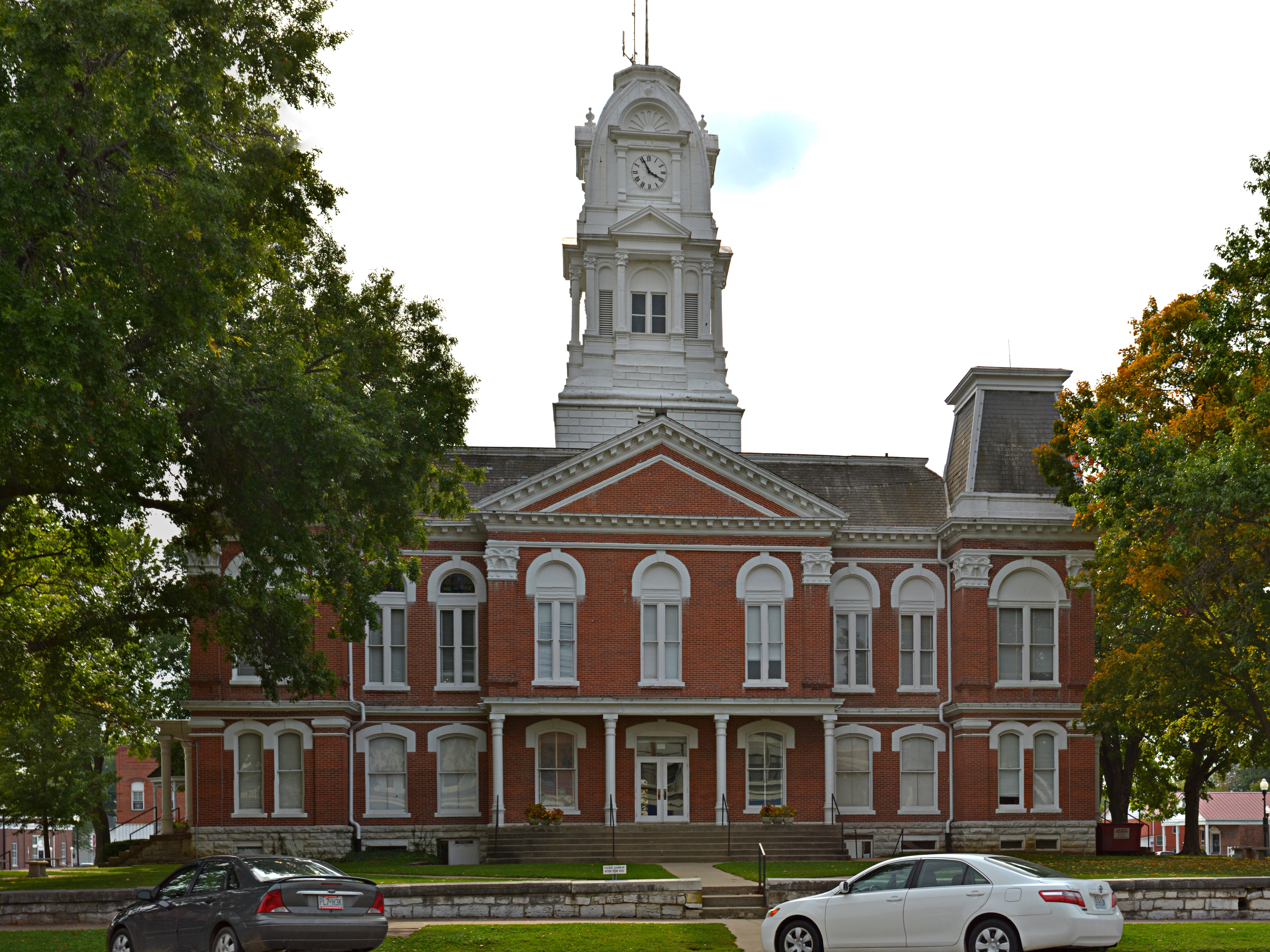
- Howard County Courthouse in Fayette
- Nickname: Mother of Counties
- Location within the U.S. state of Missouri
- Coordinates: 39°08′N 92°42′W
- Country: United States
- State: Missouri
- Founded: January 23, 1816
- Named for: Benjamin Howard
- Seat: Fayette
- Largest city: Fayette

Area
  - Total: 472 sq mi (1,220 km^{2})
  - Land: 464 sq mi (1,200 km^{2})
  - Water: 7.7 sq mi (20 km^{2}) 1.6%

Population (2020)
  - Total: 10,151
  - Estimate (2025): 10,180 ▲
  - Density: 21.9/sq mi (8.45/km^{2})
- Time zone: UTC−6 (Central)
  - Summer (DST): UTC−5 (CDT)
- Congressional district: 4th
- Website: https://www.mocounties.com/howard-county

Howard County is located in the U.S. state of Missouri, with its southern border formed by the Missouri River. As of the 2020 census, the population was 10,151. Its county seat is Fayette. Settled originally by migrants from the Upper South, it is part of the region historically known as Little Dixie. It is part of the Columbia, Missouri, metropolitan area.

The county was organized January 23, 1816, a year after the end of the War of 1812, and named for Benjamin Howard (1760–1814, served 1809–1813), two years after his death. He was an officer in the United States Army, and was appointed by President James Madison as the first Governor of the newly reorganized Missouri Territory (1812–1821), with its new capital city in nearby St. Louis. Governor Howard oversaw the new federal territory when it was separated from the previous larger Louisiana Territory of 1804–1812, which encompassed the vast uncharted Louisiana Purchase of 1803 when sold to the United States by the Emperor Napoleon I of France for $15 million. The subsequent Missouri Territory was formed nine years later after the previous short-lived Louisiana Territory's southern portion along the lower Mississippi River including the former territorial capital at the major prosperous river port city of New Orleans was approved by the United States Congress and President Madison to be admitted to the federal Union as the 18th State of Louisiana in 1812.

This was just prior to the outbreak of the War of 1812, which heralded renewed conflict with the United Kingdom. Territorial Governor Howard was involved and instrumental in the hostilities, although he died in the midst of the war's last year, and before the British Army and Royal Navy attack in the Battle of New Orleans in January 1815, the famous last battle of the war a month after a peace treaty was signed in December 1814, in Europe.

== History ==
Located on the north bank of the Missouri River, Howard County was settled primarily from the Upper Southern states of Kentucky, Tennessee and Virginia. The migrants brought slaves and slaveholding traditions with them, and cultivated hemp and tobacco, crops of Middle Tennessee. Howard was one of several counties settled mainly by Southerners along the Missouri River in the center of the state. Because of this, this area became known as Little Dixie, and Howard County was at its heart. Following the 1848 revolutions in the German nations, many German immigrants also came to this region, developing farms.

Due to the reliance on slave labor, by 1860 African-American slaves composed at least 25 percent of the county's population. Given their backgrounds and cultural affiliations, many Howard County residents supported the Confederacy during the Civil War. Ethnic German immigrants and descendants tended to support the Union.

After the end of Reconstruction, whites enforced Jim Crow laws and racial segregation in the county to maintain white supremacy. In the most violent period, at the turn of the 20th century, five African Americans were lynched in Howard County from 1891 to 1914: Olli Truxton, Frank Embree, Thomas Hayden, Arthur McNeal, and Dallas Shields. Howard County tied with Pike County for the highest rate of lynchings in the state.

The county continued to be developed for agriculture and is still largely rural. However, Howard County has lost population since its peak in 1880. The mechanization of farming reduced the demand for labor, and many workers left for jobs in the cities and less oppressive societies. By 2000 African Americans in the county had declined to less than seven percent of the total. In the early 21st century, nearly one-third of the residents identify as being of German ancestry, reflecting the wave of mid-19th century immigration.

== Geography ==
According to the U.S. Census Bureau, the county has a total area of 472 square miles (1,220 km^{2}), of which 464 square miles (1,200 km^{2}) is land and 7.7 square miles (20 km^{2}) (1.6%) is water.

=== Adjacent counties ===
- Chariton County (northwest)
- Randolph County (northeast)
- Boone County (southeast)
- Cooper County (south)
- Saline County (west)

=== Major highways ===
- U.S. Route 40
- Route 3
- Route 5
- Route 87
- Route 124
- Route 240
- Route 240 Alternate
- Route 240 Business
- Route 240 Spur

=== National protected area ===
- Big Muddy National Fish and Wildlife Refuge (part)

== Demographics ==
Historical population
Census	Pop.	Note	%±
1820	13,426		—
1830	10,854		−19.2%
1840	13,108		20.8%
1850	13,969		6.6%
1860	15,946		14.2%
1870	17,233		8.1%
1880	18,428		6.9%
1890	17,371		−5.7%
1900	18,337		5.6%
1910	15,653		−14.6%
1920	13,997		−10.6%
1930	13,490		−3.6%
1940	13,026		−3.4%
1950	11,857		−9.0%
1960	10,859		−8.4%
1970	10,561		−2.7%
1980	10,008		−5.2%
1990	9,631		−3.8%
2000	10,212		6.0%
2010	10,144		−0.7%
2020	10,151		0.1%
2025 (est.)	10,180	▲	0.3%
U.S. Decennial Census; 1790-1960 1900-1990; 1990-2000 2010-2015

=== 2020 census ===
Howard County, Missouri – Racial and ethnic composition Note: the US Census treats Hispanic/Latino as an ethnic category. This table excludes Latinos from the racial categories and assigns them to a separate category. Hispanics/Latinos may be of any race.
Race / Ethnicity (NH = Non-Hispanic)	Pop 1980	Pop 1990	Pop 2000	Pop 2010	Pop 2020	% 1980	% 1990	% 2000	% 2010	% 2020
White alone (NH)	9,104	8,802	9,267	9,240	8,826	90.97%	91.39%	90.75%	91.09%	86.95%
Black or African American alone (NH)	835	732	694	527	542	8.34%	7.60%	6.80%	5.20%	5.34%
Native American or Alaska Native alone (NH)	10	28	33	45	34	0.10%	0.29%	0.32%	0.44%	0.33%
Asian alone (NH)	24	17	12	25	27	0.24%	0.18%	0.12%	0.25%	0.27%
Native Hawaiian or Pacific Islander alone (NH)	x	x	8	3	3	x	x	0.08%	0.03%	0.03%
Other race alone (NH)	7	7	4	5	46	0.07%	0.07%	0.04%	0.05%	0.45%
Mixed race or Multiracial (NH)	x	x	106	177	465	x	x	1.04%	1.74%	4.58%
Hispanic or Latino (any race)	28	45	88	122	208	0.28%	0.47%	0.86%	1.20%	2.05%
Total	10,008	9,631	10,212	10,144	10,151	100.00%	100.00%	100.00%	100.00%	100.00%

As of the 2020 census, the county had a population of 10,151, 3,873 households, and 2,539 families in Howard County, Missouri. The population density was 21.9 per square mile (8.5/km^{2}). There were 4,368 housing units at an average density of 9.4 per square mile (3.6/km^{2}); 11.3% of those units were vacant, 75.2% of occupied units were owner-occupied, 24.8% were renter-occupied, the homeowner vacancy rate was 1.5%, and the rental vacancy rate was 7.9%.

0.0% of residents lived in urban areas, while 100.0% lived in rural areas.

The racial makeup of the county was 87.98% (8,931) white (86.95% non-Hispanic white), 5.34% (542) black or African-American, 0.36% (37) Native American or Alaska Native, 0.27% (27) Asian, 0.03% (3) Pacific Islander or Native Hawaiian, 0.99% (101) from other races, and 5.02% (510) from two or more races. Hispanic or Latino residents of any race comprised 2.05% (208) of the population.

Of the 3,873 households, 29.3% had children under the age of 18 living with them, 49.5% were married couples living together, and 23.7% had a female householder with no spouse or partner present. About 28.4% of all households were made up of individuals and 12.8% had someone living alone who was 65 years of age or older. The average household size was 2.7 and the average family size was 3.1.

22.1% of the population was under the age of 18, 13.5% from 18 to 24, 20.8% from 25 to 44, 24.8% from 45 to 64, and 18.8% who were 65 years of age or older. The median age was 38.8 years. For every 100 females, there were 100.3 males. For every 100 females ages 18 and older, there were 96.0 males.

The percent of those with a bachelor's degree or higher was estimated to be 19.5% of the population. The 2016–2020 5-year American Community Survey estimates show that the median household income was $55,000 (with a margin of error of +/- $3,456). The median family income was $66,495 (+/- $4,854). Males had a median income of $36,139 (+/- $2,724) versus $25,043 (+/- $3,270) for females. The median income for those above 16 years old was $30,623 (+/- $1,907). Approximately, 6.7% of families and 11.7% of the population were below the poverty line, including 15.3% of those under the age of 18 and 8.5% of those ages 65 or over.

=== 2000 census ===
As of the census of 2000, there were 10,212 people, 3,836 households, and 2,631 families residing in the county. The population density was 22 people per square mile (8.5 people/km^{2}). There were 4,346 housing units at an average density of 9 units per square mile (3.5/km^{2}). The racial makeup of the county was 91.13% White, 6.84% Black or African American, 0.33% Native American, 0.12% Asian, 0.08% Pacific Islander, 0.40% from other races, and 1.10% from two or more races. Approximately 0.86% of the population were Hispanic or Latino of any race. 32.4% were of German, 16.1% American, 8.9% English and 8.3% Irish ancestry.

There were 3,836 households, out of which 31.50% had children under the age of 18 living with them, 55.30% were married couples living together, 9.50% had a female householder with no husband present, and 31.40% were non-families. 27.30% of all households were made up of individuals, and 13.30% had someone living alone who was 65 years of age or older. The average household size was 2.46 and the average family size was 2.98.

In the county, the population was spread out, with 24.00% under the age of 18, 13.30% from 18 to 24, 25.20% from 25 to 44, 21.30% from 45 to 64, and 16.10% who were 65 years of age or older. The median age was 37 years. For every 100 females, there were 94.00 males. For every 100 females age 18 and over, there were 94.40 males.

The median income for a household in the county was $31,614, and the median income for a family was $40,167. Males had a median income of $26,369 versus $19,950 for females. The per capita income for the county was $15,198. About 7.50% of families and 11.60% of the population were below the poverty line, including 14.70% of those under age 18 and 14.40% of those age 65 or over.

== Education ==
=== Public schools ===
School districts covering sections of the county include:

- Fayette R-III School District – Fayette
  - Laurence J. Daly Elementary School (PK-05)
  - William N. Clark Middle School (06–08)
  - Fayette High School (09–12)
- Glasgow School District – Glasgow
  - Howard County Elementary School (PK-06)
  - Glasgow High School (07–12)
- Harrisburg R-VIII School District
- Higbee R-VIII School District
- New Franklin R-I School District – New Franklin
  - New Franklin Elementary School (PK-05)
  - New Franklin Middle/High School (06–12)
- Salisbury R-IV School District

=== Private schools ===
- St. Mary's Catholic School – Glasgow (K-08) – Roman Catholic
- Grace & Glory Christian Academy – New Franklin (K-12) – Baptist - [Closed]

=== Post-secondary ===
- Central Methodist University – Fayette – A private, four-year Methodist university.

=== Public libraries ===
- Howard County Library
- Lewis Library of Glasgow

== Communities ==
=== Cities and Towns ===
- Armstrong
- Fayette (county seat)
- Franklin
- Glasgow
- New Franklin

=== Unincorporated communities ===
- Boonesboro
- Bunker Hill
- Burton
- Estill
- Hilldale
- Lisbon
- Roanoke
- Sebree
- Steinmetz

== Notable people ==
- Frank P. Briggs - former United States Senator and Assistant U.S. Secretary of the Interior.
- Sara Evans - American country music singer.
- Spottswood Rice - Union Soldier in the Civil War and African Methodist Episcopal Church minister.
- Talbot Smith, United States District Judge
- Kit Carson - Trapper and guide for John Charles Fremont
- Caius T. Ryland - Speaker of the California State Assembly

== Politics ==
=== Local ===
The Democratic Party predominantly controls politics at the local level in Howard County. Democrats hold all but four of the elected positions in the county.

Howard County, Missouri

Elected countywide officials
Assessor	John (Woody) McCutcheon	Democratic
Circuit Clerk	Charles J. Flaspohler	Democratic
County Clerk	Shelly Howell	Republican
Collector	Jinger Felten	Republican
Commissioner (presiding)	Jeremiah Johnmeyer	Republican
Commissioner (district 1)	Richard Conrow	Democratic
Commissioner (district 2)	Howard McMillan	Democratic
Coroner	Frank Flaspohler	Democratic
Prosecuting Attorney	Deborah Riekhof	Republican
Public Administrator	Lisa Asbury	Democratic
Recorder	Charles J. Flaspohler	Democratic
Sheriff	Jeff Oswald	Republican
Surveyor	Gene Bowen	Democratic
Treasurer	Susan Keyton	Democratic

=== State ===
Past Gubernatorial Elections Results
Year	Republican	Democratic	Third Parties
2024	71.16% 3,481	26.08% 1,276	2.76% 135
2020	69.58% 3,525	27.38% 1,387	3.04% 154
2016	56.47% 2,727	40.26% 1,944	3.27% 158
2012	47.89% 2,302	48.89% 2,350	3.22% 155
2008	48.69% 2,358	49.08% 2,377	2.33% 108
2004	52.46% 2,578	46.34% 2,277	1.20% 59
2000	44.96% 2,029	52.12% 2,352	2.92% 132
1996	33.90% 1,436	63.53% 2,691	2.57% 109

Howard County is split between two districts of the Missouri House of Representatives, both of which are represented by Republicans.

- District 47 — Chuck Basye consists of the eastern part of the county.

Missouri House of Representatives — District 47 — Howard County (2016)
Party	Candidate	Votes	%	±%
Republican	Chuck Basye	625	72.17%	+8.83
Democratic	Susan McClintic	241	27.83%	−8.83

Missouri House of Representatives — District 47 — Howard County (2014)
Party	Candidate	Votes	%	±%
Republican	Chuck Basye	330	63.34%	+5.61
Democratic	John Wright	191	36.66%	−5.61

Missouri House of Representatives — District 47 — Howard County (2012)
Party	Candidate	Votes	%	±%
Republican	Mitch Richards	474	57.73%	
Democratic	John Wright	347	42.27%	

- District 48 — Dave Muntzel consists of the central and western parts of the county.

Missouri House of Representatives — District 48 — Howard County (2016)
Party	Candidate	Votes	%	±%
Republican	Dave Muntzel	2,893	78.15%	−21.85
Independent	Debra Dilks	809	21.85%	+21.85

Missouri House of Representatives — District 48 — Howard County (2014)
Party	Candidate	Votes	%	±%
Republican	Dave Muntzel	1,962	100.00%	+50.61

Missouri House of Representatives — District 48 — Howard County (2012)
Party	Candidate	Votes	%	±%
Republican	Dave Muntzel	1,910	49.39%	
Democratic	Ron Monnig	1,957	50.61%	

All of Howard County is a part of Missouri's 21st District in the Missouri Senate and is currently represented by Denny Hoskins (R-Warrensburg).

Missouri Senate — District 21 — Howard County (2016)
Party	Candidate	Votes	%	±%
Republican	Denny Hoskins	2,970	65.36%	+3.81
Democratic	ElGene Ver Dught	1,254	27.60%	−4.68
Libertarian	Bill Wayne	320	7.04%	+0.87

Missouri Senate — District 21 — Howard County (2012)
Party	Candidate	Votes	%	±%
Republican	David Pearce	2,835	61.55%	
Democratic	ElGene Ver Dught	1,487	32.28%	
Libertarian	Steven Hedrick	284	6.17%	

=== Federal ===
U.S. Senate — Missouri — Howard County (2016)
Party	Candidate	Votes	%	±%
Republican	Roy Blunt	2,671	55.27%	+11.59
Democratic	Jason Kander	1,928	39.89%	−7.89
Libertarian	Jonathan Dine	134	2.77%	−5.77
Green	Johnathan McFarland	48	0.99%	+0.99
Constitution	Fred Ryman	52	1.08%	+1.08

U.S. Senate — Missouri — Howard County (2012)
Party	Candidate	Votes	%	±%
Republican	Todd Akin	2,101	43.68%	
Democratic	Claire McCaskill	2,298	47.78%	
Libertarian	Jonathan Dine	411	8.54%	

All of Howard County is included in Missouri's 4th Congressional District and is currently represented by Vicky Hartzler (R-Harrisonville) in the U.S. House of Representatives.

U.S. House of Representatives — Missouri's 4th Congressional District — Howard County (2016)
Party	Candidate	Votes	%	±%
Republican	Vicky Hartzler	3,131	66.82%	+2.48
Democratic	Gordon Christensen	1,300	27.74%	−1.25
Libertarian	Mark Bliss	255	5.44%	−1.23

U.S. House of Representatives — Missouri's 4th Congressional District — Howard County (2014)
Party	Candidate	Votes	%	±%
Republican	Vicky Hartzler	1,833	64.34%	+8.04
Democratic	Nate Irvin	826	28.99%	−9.25
Libertarian	Herschel Young	190	6.67%	+2.45

U.S. House of Representatives — Missouri’s 4th Congressional District — Howard County (2012)
Party	Candidate	Votes	%	±%
Republican	Vicky Hartzler	2,640	56.30%	
Democratic	Teresa Hensley	1,793	38.24%	
Libertarian	Thomas Holbrook	198	4.22%	
Constitution	Greg Cowan	58	1.24%	

United States presidential election results for Howard County, Missouri
Year	Republican		Democratic		Third party(ies)	
Year	No.	%	No.	%	No.	%
1888	1,278	32.48%	2,577	65.49%	80	2.03%
1892	1,052	28.05%	2,570	68.52%	129	3.44%
1896	1,353	28.80%	3,317	70.60%	28	0.60%
1900	1,295	28.75%	3,134	69.57%	76	1.69%
1904	1,199	30.52%	2,674	68.06%	56	1.43%
1908	1,141	28.15%	2,884	71.16%	28	0.69%
1912	896	23.63%	2,672	70.48%	223	5.88%
1916	1,121	27.86%	2,866	71.24%	36	0.89%
1920	2,125	30.85%	4,735	68.74%	28	0.41%
1924	1,873	27.30%	4,759	69.37%	228	3.32%
1928	2,254	33.54%	4,452	66.25%	14	0.21%
1932	1,337	19.85%	5,354	79.47%	46	0.68%
1936	1,745	24.61%	5,326	75.10%	21	0.30%
1940	2,333	32.75%	4,770	66.97%	20	0.28%
1944	1,951	32.97%	3,958	66.88%	9	0.15%
1948	1,538	27.02%	4,143	72.77%	12	0.21%
1952	2,340	39.12%	3,635	60.77%	7	0.12%
1956	2,177	38.07%	3,542	61.93%	0	0.00%
1960	2,075	38.59%	3,302	61.41%	0	0.00%
1964	1,339	27.63%	3,507	72.37%	0	0.00%
1968	1,825	39.12%	2,333	50.01%	507	10.87%
1972	2,613	56.15%	2,041	43.85%	0	0.00%
1976	1,690	37.61%	2,769	61.62%	35	0.78%
1980	2,179	47.85%	2,243	49.25%	132	2.90%
1984	2,360	53.96%	2,014	46.04%	0	0.00%
1988	1,865	43.15%	2,446	56.59%	11	0.25%
1992	1,253	28.20%	2,085	46.93%	1,105	24.87%
1996	1,545	36.76%	2,014	47.92%	644	15.32%
2000	2,414	53.50%	1,944	43.09%	154	3.41%
2004	2,915	59.24%	1,972	40.07%	34	0.69%
2008	2,708	55.78%	2,036	41.94%	111	2.29%
2012	3,017	61.99%	1,723	35.40%	127	2.61%
2016	3,277	67.32%	1,283	26.36%	308	6.33%
2020	3,553	69.78%	1,413	27.75%	126	2.47%
2024	3,534	71.31%	1,341	27.06%	81	1.63%

=== Missouri presidential preference primary (2008) ===
Former U.S. Senator Hillary Clinton (D-New York) received more votes, a total of 685, than any candidate from either party in Howard County during the 2008 presidential primary.

== See also ==
- National Register of Historic Places listings in Howard County, Missouri
