= Lewis Creek =

Lewis Creek may refer to:

Streams

- Lewis Creek (San Lorenzo Creek) in California.
- Lewis Creek (Idaho)
- Lewis Creek (Flathead River tributary), a stream in Montana
- Lewis Creek (Susquehanna River tributary), a stream in Pennsylvania
- Lewis Creek (Batavia Kill tributary), a stream in New York

Populated places

- Lewis Creek, Indiana

== See also ==
- Lewis Run (disambiguation)
