= Oscar Widmann =

American interior designer

- Born: Oscar Otto Widmann; November 8, 1888; Brooklyn, New York
- Died: June 2, 1961 (aged 72); Stamford, Connecticut
- Occupation: Interior Designer

Oscar Widmann (1888–1961) was an interior designer, a founder of the American Institute of Interior Decorators, and a president of the Institute's New York Chapter. He is known for having designed interior spaces for numerous educational institutions, including Yale University, Harvard University, and in New York, the Saint Thomas Choir School. He also designed interior spaces for banks, offices, and private houses. Widmann studied design at the Pratt Institute, and graduated with a Bachelor of Arts (1909) from the Brooklyn Polytechnic Institute.

== Early life and career ==
Oscar Widmann was born at Brooklyn, New York on November 8, 1888, the son of Eugene Widmann (1842–1916), a German Immigrant who operated a restaurant in lower Manhattan. The father's business success allowed him to send the younger Widmann to Brooklyn's Poly Prep Country Day School where he acquired a taste for the stage. "The very first thing I ever did," Widmann told a reporter in 1921, "was at Poly Prep when I was a youngster...Mr. William J. Peters was my elocution teacher, and one day he came to me and said that the boys were getting up a play and he wanted me to come to the first reading...I was offered a very small part, a parlor maid with a policeman for a beau." Following this initial success, Widmann appeared in "two or three shows a year up until the time of the war," becoming renowned as "Brooklyn's most celebrated impersonator of feminine roles." The Poly Prep shows grew more elaborate over time, including the Poly Prep Alumni's presentation of The Blue Butterfly, staged in 1915 at the Brooklyn Academy of Music, which according to one critic, "ought to go on Broadway." Edwin Hicks Bigelow played the part of Mrs. Flutterby ("twice a widow and after her third husband") while Widmann played the part of Mabel, Mrs. Flutterby's daughter. According to the critic, Widmann (age 27 at the time) "bore close inspection from the fifth row in the orchestra through a pair of very good opera glasses and was pronounced an extremely pretty girl. His gowns were clever and equalled only by those of Mr. Bigelow"

In 1926, Widmann engaged to marry Marian F. Meyers of Ridgewood, New Jersey, a graduate of Vassar College class of 1922, the daughter of James Cowden Meyers, a successful attorney with a Manhattan-based practice. "A more interesting engagement could hardly be imagined," Brooklyn Life opined, "not only because Oscar Widmann has been the most confirmed of bachelors, but because he has from boyhood been a central Society figure of Brooklyn and the overshadowing, irreplaceable executive and chief actor of each Poly [Prep Alumni] Show." The magazine's editors allowed that while, "Oscar Widmann's fame in Brooklyn and Manhattan does not rest entirely on the Poly Shows, he has been most widely known because of them," noting his "admirable playing of the leading feminine part in each," his "elaborate and striking costumes," and his having acted as the "chief force" behind each production. The editors noted that, professionally speaking, Widmann was an "interior decorator" and that his decorating work was "quite as interesting if less talked of than his Poly Show feats."

In June 1917, Widmann registered for the draft. He was 28 years old, of medium height and medium build, with blue eyes and light hair (balding), and gave his occupation as interior decorator at the Manhattan firm of Mack, Jenney & Tyler. In August 1918, Widmann enlisted in the US Navy, and served as a Seaman 2nd class in the naval reserves until September 1921. Prior to his discharge from the Navy, he bought an interest in the Manhattan "architectural and decorative contracting and manufacturing firm" of A. Kimbel & Son, Inc. (founded in 1882), where William A. Kimbel acted as president, and Widmann as vice-president. The partnership of the two men began in 1920 and continued until 1941, when Kimbel retired to South Carolina. Beyond their decorating, manufacturing of reproduction furniture, and dealing in antiquities, both helped to found the American Institute of Designers; Kimbel was president of the New York chapter from 1935–36, and Widmann from 1944–45.

A. Kimbel & Son dissolved in 1941. Kimbel and Widmann sold their remaining inventory at the Parke-Bernet auction house on March 14–15, including "four paneled rooms, brocades and other fabrics, tapestries, lamps and decorative objects...the stock of the old established firm of decorators, A. Kimbel & Son, Inc...consequent to their decision to discontinue their former policy of maintaining an inventory, by order of William A. Kimbel."

After his marriage, Widmann and his family lived at Brooklyn Heights, but in the early 1930s, they relocated to Darien, Connecticut, where Widmann lived until his death in 1961. He was the father-in-law of the architect David Bruce Falconer, and grandfather of the author, illustrator, and theater set and costume designer Ian Falconer.

== Representative works ==
=== A. Kimbel & Son (1920–1941) ===
- Fur salon for Revillon Frères, (interior design, 1929).
- Banquette room, Weylin Hotel, New York City (interior design, 1929).
- Plaza Branch, Central Hanover Bank & Trust Co. (alterations and interior design, 1931).
- Conyngham residence, Hayfield Farm, Lehman Twp., Pennsylvania (interior design, 1934) with Francis Nelson, Architect.
- Fitz Randolph House, Brooklyn Heights, New York (interior decoration for Carolyn Widmann Fitz Randolph, 1936).

=== Oscar O. Widmann, Interior Design (1941–1961) ===
- Scarsdale Public Library, Scarsdale, NY (interior design for new building, completed 1951).
- Life Magazine prototypical house, (interior design, 1953).

== See also ==
- Kimbel and Cabus
- Ian Falconer
