= Hunlock Creek =

River in eastern Pennsylvania

Hunlock Creek Hunlocks Creek
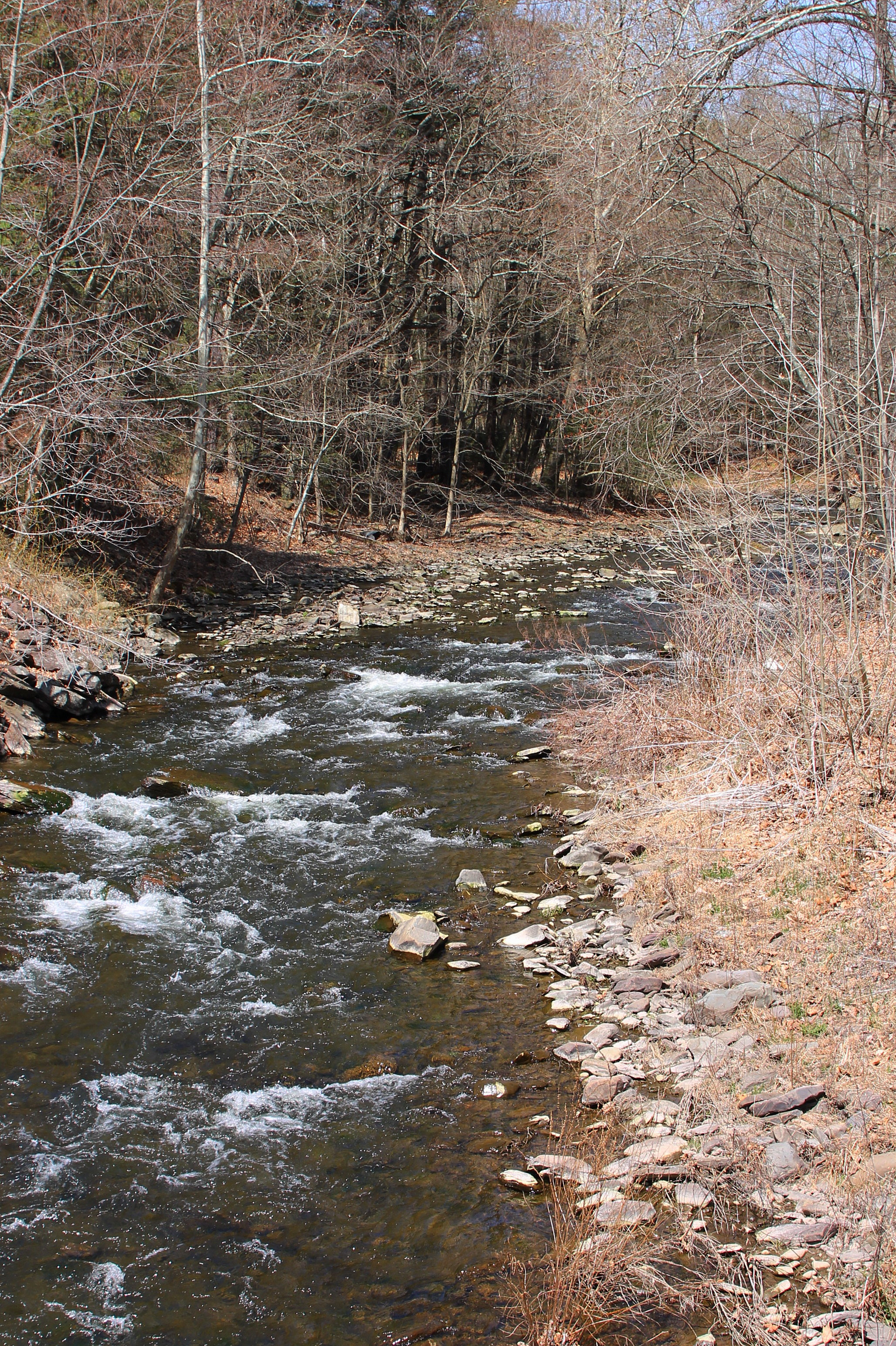
- Hunlock Creek looking upstream in its lower reaches
- Native name: Massacota

Physical characteristics
- Source
  - location: valley northwest of Lake Silkworth in Lehman Township, Luzerne County, Pennsylvania
  - elevation: between 1,140 and 1,160 feet (347 and 354 m)
- Mouth
  - location: Susquehanna River in Hunlock Township, Luzerne County, Pennsylvania
  - coordinates: 41°12′16″N 76°03′46″W
  - elevation: 512 ft (156 m)
- Length: 7.8 mi (12.6 km)
- Basin size: 32.5 mi^{2} (84 km^{2})

Basin features
- Progression: Susquehanna River → Chesapeake Bay
- Tributaries
  - left: four unnamed tributaries
  - right: Roaring Brook

Hunlock Creek (also known as Hunlocks Creek) is a tributary of the Susquehanna River in Luzerne County, Pennsylvania, in the United States. It is approximately 7.8 miles (12.6 km) long and flows through Lehman Township and Hunlock Township. The watershed of the creek has an area of 32.5 square miles (84 km^{2}) and is situated in northwestern Luzerne County. It has one named tributary, which is known as Roaring Brook, and a number of unnamed and unofficially named tributaries, such as "West Branch Hunlock Creek".

Hunlock Creek is designated as a coldwater fishery and a migratory fishery, and part of it is inhabited by wild trout. The annual rate of precipitation in the watershed is 35 to 45 inches (89 to 114 cm). Rock formations consisting of sandstone and shale are common in the vicinity of the creek. A number of bridges have been built over the creek and it was the site of a furnace in the 1800s. An area listed on the Luzerne County Natural Areas Inventory is located in the creek's watershed.

== Course ==
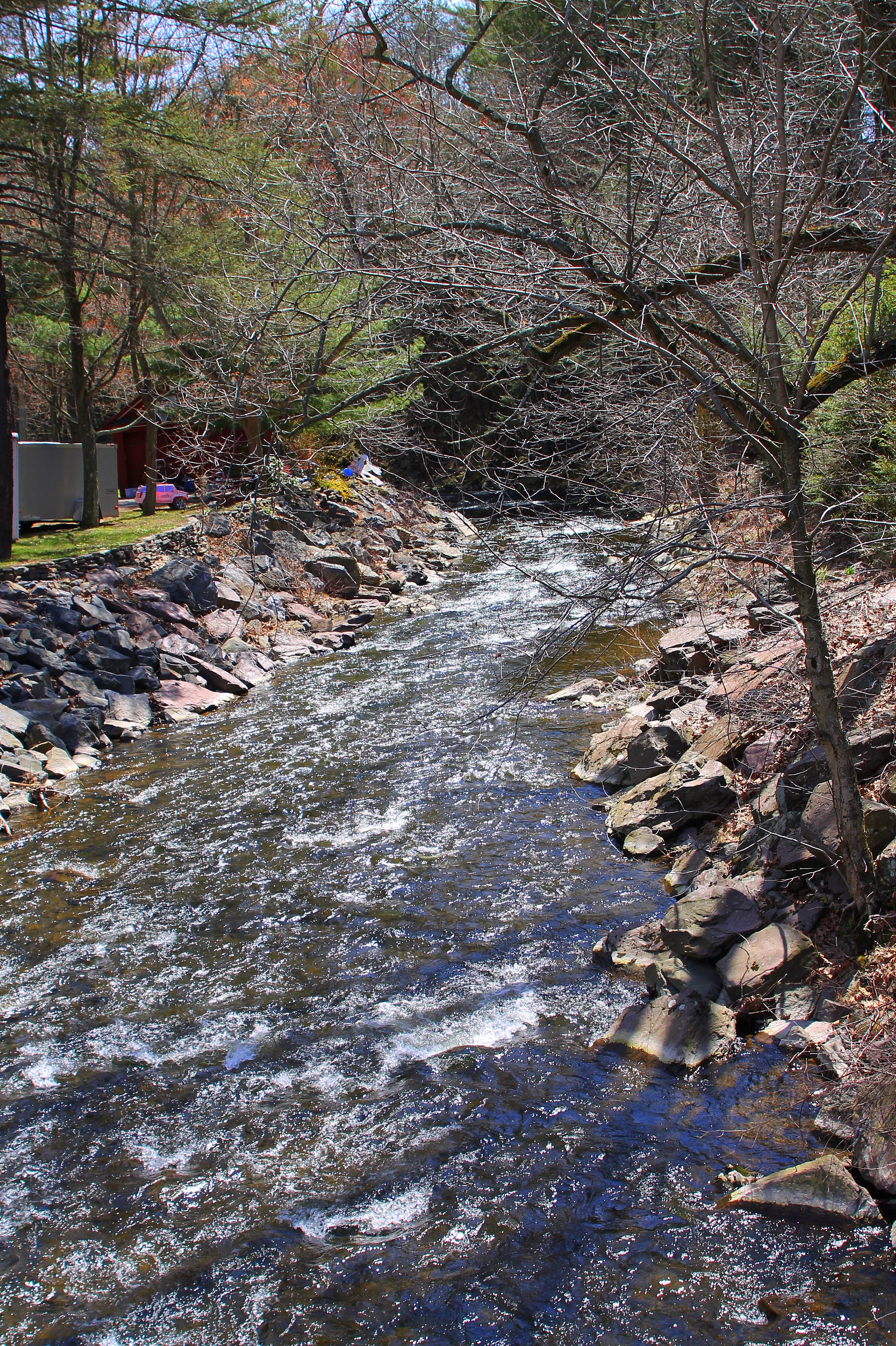
Hunlock Creek looking downstream in its lower reaches

Hunlock Creek begins in a valley in Lehman Township, a short distance northwest of Lake Silkworth. It flows south for several tenths of a mile before turning south-southeast for a similar distance and receiving an unnamed tributary from the left. The creek then turns south for approximately half a mile, exiting Lehman Township and entering Hunlock Township. It continues flowing generally southwards for more than a mile and its valley widens considerably. The creek receives another unnamed tributary from the left before its valley narrows again and it turns southwest. After approximately a mile, it receives Roaring Brook, its only named tributary, from the right. The creek then turns south-southeast for a few miles, receiving one unnamed tributary from the left and one from the right. The creek turns east-northeast for several tenths of a mile and receives another unnamed tributary from the left. It then turns southeast, passing through a water gap and crossing US Route 11 in the village of Hunlock Creek. A short distance further downstream, the creek reaches its confluence with the Susquehanna River.

Hunlock Creek joins the Susquehanna River 178.21 miles (286.80 km) upriver of its mouth.

=== Tributaries ===
Hunlock Creek has one named tributary, which is known as Roaring Brook. Roaring Brook joins Hunlock Creek 3.99 miles (6.42 km) upstream of its mouth. Its watershed has an area of 6.17 square miles (16.0 km^{2}). Hunlock Creek also has an unnamed tributary that is unofficially known as "West Branch Hunlock Creek". This tributary is approximately 7.60 miles (12.23 km) long. Additionally, it has a number of other unnamed tributaries.

== Hydrology and climate ==
Hunlock Creek is not designated as an impaired waterbody, meaning that it attains standards for water quality.

The peak annual discharge of Hunlock Creek at its mouth has a 10 percent chance of reaching 2,780 cubic feet per second (79 m^{3}/s). The discharge has a 2 percent chance of reaching 5,600 cubic feet per second (160 m^{3}/s) and a 1 percent chance of reaching 7,400 cubic feet per second (210 m^{3}/s). It has a 0.2 percent chance of reaching 13,900 cubic feet per second (390 m^{3}/s).

At the confluence of one of its tributaries with the main stem, the discharge of Hunlock Creek has a 10 percent chance of peaking at 2,100 cubic feet per second (59 m^{3}/s) in any given year. It has a 2 percent chance of peaking at 4,300 cubic feet per second (120 m^{3}/s), a 1 percent chance of peaking at 5,650 cubic feet per second (160 m^{3}/s), and a 0.2 percent chance of peaking at 10,800 cubic feet per second (310 m^{3}/s).

The peak annual discharge of Hunlock Creek at the confluence of another one of its tributaries with the main stem has a 10 percent chance of reaching 1,460 cubic feet per second (41 m^{3}/s). The discharge has a 2 percent chance of reaching 3,050 cubic feet per second (86 m^{3}/s) and a 1 percent chance of reaching 4,050 cubic feet per second (115 m^{3}/s). It has a 0.2 percent chance of reaching 7,900 cubic feet per second (220 m^{3}/s).

The average annual rate of precipitation in the watershed of Hunlock Creek is 35 to 45 inches (89 to 114 cm).

== Geography and geology ==
The elevation near the mouth of Hunlock Creek is 512 feet (156 m) above sea level. The elevation near the creek's source is between 1,140 and 1,160 feet (347 and 354 m) above sea level. The creek's elevation decreases at a rate of 79.3 feet (24.2 m) per mile.

A high ridge runs from near Hunlock Creek westward to the Shickshinny Gap. This ridge is known as Shickshinny Mountain and is made from Pocono beds. Green sandstone and red shale occur along the creek. A sandstone formation containing red quartz pebbles also occurs in the area and at one point forms a 30-foot (9.1 m) high cliff along the creek. Additionally, shale of the Mauch Chunk Formation can be found in the vicinity of the creek.

Drift heaps cover the old channel of Hunlock Creek.

A 1921 report by the Water Supply Commission of Pennsylvania described the topography of the watershed of Hunlock Creek as "rough and hilly". The creek cuts through a mountain range in its lower reaches. Swamps and glacial lakes occur in the watershed. The channel of the creek is sinuous and cuts through rock formations consisting of sandstone and shale.

== Watershed ==
The watershed of Hunlock Creek has an area of 32.5 square miles (84 km^{2}). The creek's mouth is in the United States Geological Survey quadrangle of Nanticoke. However, its source is in the quadrangle of Harveys Lake. The watershed is in the northwestern part of Luzerne County. It is part of the Lower North Branch Susquehanna drainage basin.

Hunlock Creek is described as a "good-sized creek" in the 1909 book A History of Wilkes-Barré, Luzerne County, Pennsylvania, from Its First Beginnings to the Present Time.

== History ==
Hunlock Creek was entered into the Geographic Names Information System on August 2, 1979. Its identifier in the Geographic Names Information System is 1177599.

Johnathan Hunlock came to the vicinity of Hunlock Creek from Lower Smithfield Township in the early 1770s and constructed a plantation on the creek. On March 28, 1780, Asa Upman and John Rogers were ambushed by Indians while making sugar near the mouth of Hunlock Creek. Upman was killed and Rogers was captured. The 1893 book History of Luzerne County, Pennsylvania referred to this incident as "one of the bloody episodes in the days of Indian troubles".

William Koons constructed a furnace on Hunlock Creek in the 1800s. This furnace was capable of producing 75 tons of pig metal per week. In the early 1900s, major communities in the watershed of Hunlock Creek included Hunlock Creek, Sweet Valley, and Silkworth. In 1921, their populations were 310, 190, and 24, respectively. Around this time, the main industry in the creek's watershed was agriculture.

Two two-span concrete tee beam bridges carrying State Route 4016 were built over Hunlock Creek in Hunlock Township in 1925. The bridges are 65.9 feet (20.1 m) and 58.1 feet (17.7 m) long. Both bridges underwent repair work in 1983. A concrete slab bridge carrying Pritchards Road was built over the creek in 1937. This bridge is 23.0 feet (7.0 m) long. A masonry arch bridge carrying State Route 4005/Cragle Road over the creek in Hunlock Township was built in 1938 and is 34.1 feet (10.4 m) long. A concrete tee beam bridge carrying US Route 11 over Hunlock Creek was constructed in 1940. It is 47.9 feet (14.6 m) long. In 1974, a prestressed box beam bridge was built over the creek near State Route 4003. It is 35.1 feet (10.7 m) long and carries Spring Hill Road.

Hunlock Creek is also known as Hunlocks Creek. This name appears on Patton's Philadelphia and Suburbs Street and Road Map from 1984. The creek was known as Massacota by the Native Americans.

== Biology ==
The entire drainage basin of Hunlock Creek is classified as a coldwater fishery and a migratory fishery in Chapter 93.9 of the Pennsylvania Code. Wild trout naturally reproduce in the creek from T-534 downstream to its mouth. This stretch is 3.9 miles (6.3 km) long. They also naturally reproduce in the tributary Roaring Brook and in the unofficially named tributary West Branch Hunlock Creek.

The Shickshinny Mountain Slopes, which are listed as a Locally Significant Area in the Luzerne County Natural Areas Inventory, are located in the watershed of Hunlock Creek in Plymouth Township. These slopes are on the northern side of Shickshinny Mountain and contain second-growth northern hardwood forests and some rock outcroppings with small seeps. The area contains a large number of wildflower species and some rare plants. The main tree species in this area include American basswood, sugar maple, white ash, white oak, black cherry, and eastern hemlock.

== See also ==
- Shickshinny Creek, next tributary on the west side of the Susquehanna River going downriver
- Harveys Creek, next tributary on the west side of the Susquehanna River going upriver
- List of rivers of Pennsylvania
