= Francis Augustus Nelson =

American architect

Francis Augustus Nelson (1878–1950) was an American architect from Montclair, New Jersey.

== Early life and education ==
Francis A. Nelson was born on February 2, 1878, at Honolulu, Hawaii, the son of Dr. Henry Clay Nelson, a US Navy surgeon. In 1893, the year his father died, Nelson was boarding at St. Paul's School, Concord, New Hampshire. On June 5, 1900, he married Helen Ackerman at the Memorial Presbyterian Church, Park Slope, Brooklyn, and on June 10, he graduated from Columbia University with a Bachelor of Science in Architecture. In 1903, Nelson won a McKim Fellowship of $900, administered by Columbia University, for travel abroad.

== Career ==
Beginning about 1905, Nelson taught architectural design at Columbia University, remaining on the faculty until at least 1917. During the same period, he practiced architecture in partnership with Hubert Van Wagenen, a Columbia graduate of the class of 1899. The partnership ended with Wagenen's death in 1915. In 1920, Nelson's office was located at 15 West 38th Street, New York City, but by 1915 he was living in Upper Montclair, New Jersey, where about 1916 he built a house for himself and his family at 303 Highland Avenue. Nelson lived there until his death in March 1950.

== Architectural works of Nelson & Van Wagenen ==
- Fort Washington Collegiate Church, New York City (completed 1909).
- Bethany Memorial Church Mission Building, 400 E. 67th Street, New York City (completed 1910; demolished 2002).
- Second Congregational Church, Lynn, Massachusetts (completed 1911).
- Women's University Club, 106 East 52nd Street, New York City (completed 1914).
- Montclair Public Library, Bellevue Avenue Branch, Montclair, New Jersey (completed 1914).
- Mrs. James P. Olney Residence, Rome, New York (completed about 1916).
- John H. J. Stewart Residence, Cold Spring Harbor, New York (completed about 1916).
- Mrs. S. J. Chase Residence, Cold Spring Harbor, New York (completed about 1916).
- Mrs. Edward Trenchard Residence, Babylon, New York (completed about 1916 with Theodore Crane, Associate).
- Congregational Church of the Evangel, Bedford Avenue, Brooklyn, New York (completed 1917).

== Architectural works of Francis A. Nelson ==
- 303 Highland Avenue (Francis A. Nelson Residence), Montclair, New Jersey (completed about 1916).
- 310 Highland Avenue (Residence), Montclair, New Jersey (completed 1929)
- 301 Highland Avenue (Residence), Montclair, New Jersey (completed 1916).
- Music Studio, Northview Avenue, Montclair, New Jersey (completed about 1918).
- Post Office Building, Montclair, New Jersey (completed 1918).
- The Huguenot Memorial Church, Pelham Manor, New York (completed 1919).
- Tower, St. James Church, Montclair, New Jersey (dedicated December 1919).
- 159 Upper Mountain Avenue (Residence), Montclair, New Jersey (completed 1919).
- 162 Upper Mountain Avenue (Residence), Montclair, New Jersey.
- Chevy Chase Presbyterian Church, Washington DC (completed 1922), winner of Architecture League of America's 1921 gold medal.
- L. Bamberger & Co. Model Home, Vassar Ave. at Elizabeth Ave., Newark, New Jersey (completed 1923).
- Woman's Club of Upper Montclair, Clubhouse (completed 1924).
- 117 Bellevue Avenue (Residence), Montclair, New Jersey (completed about 1924).
- 273 Upper Mountain Avenue (Residence), Montclair, New Jersey (completed 1927).
- 320 Upper Mountain Avenue (Residence), Montclair, New Jersey, (completed about 1927).
- The Anchorage (Residence), Montclair, New Jersey (completed 1930).
- Hayfield Farm (Residence), Lehman Twp., Pennsylvania (completed 1934), with interior decoration by Oscar Widmann.
- 88 Upper Mountain Avenue (Residence), Montclair, New Jersey (completed 1946).

== Gallery ==
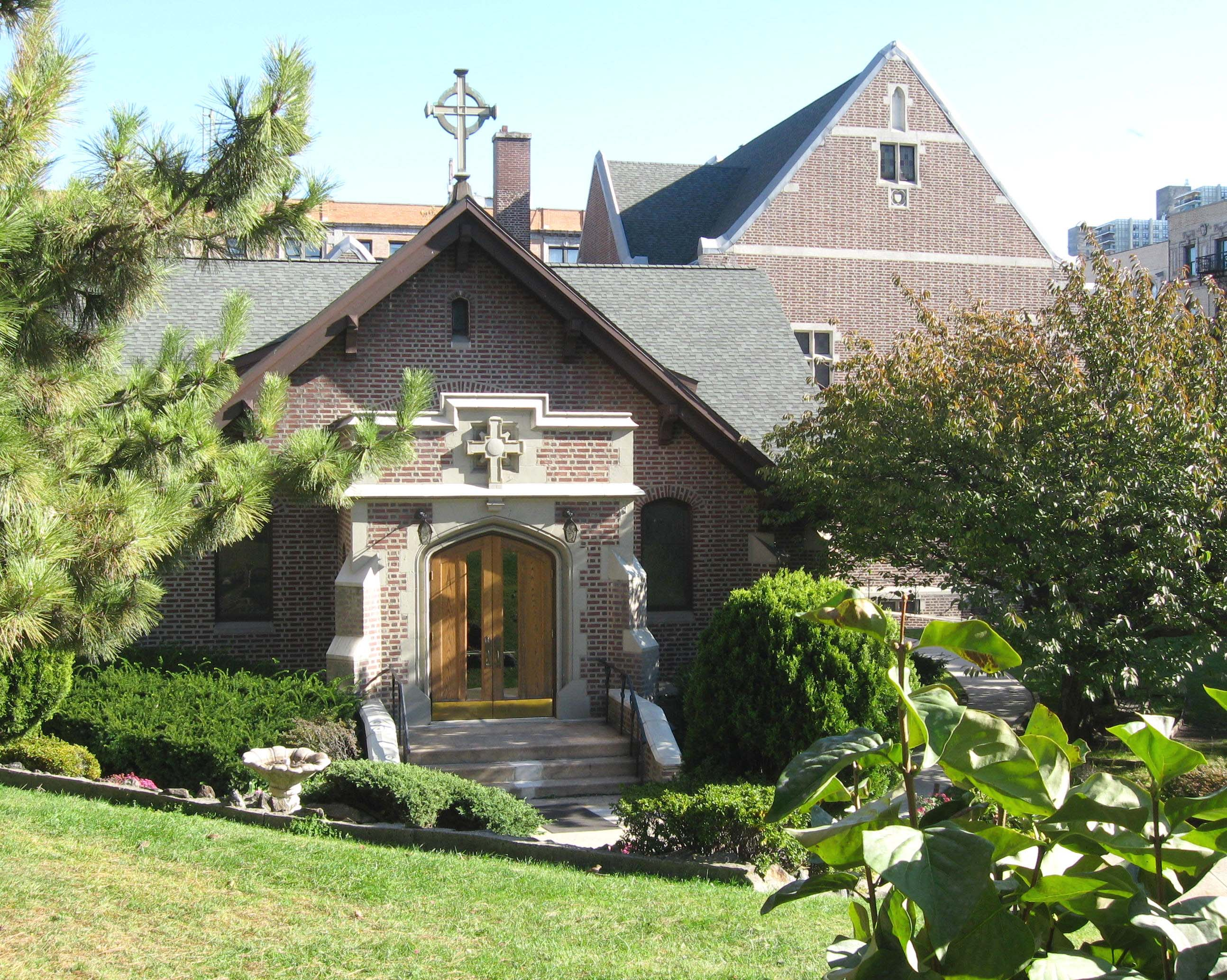
Fort Washington Collegiate Church, built 1909, as Nelson & Van Wagenen.

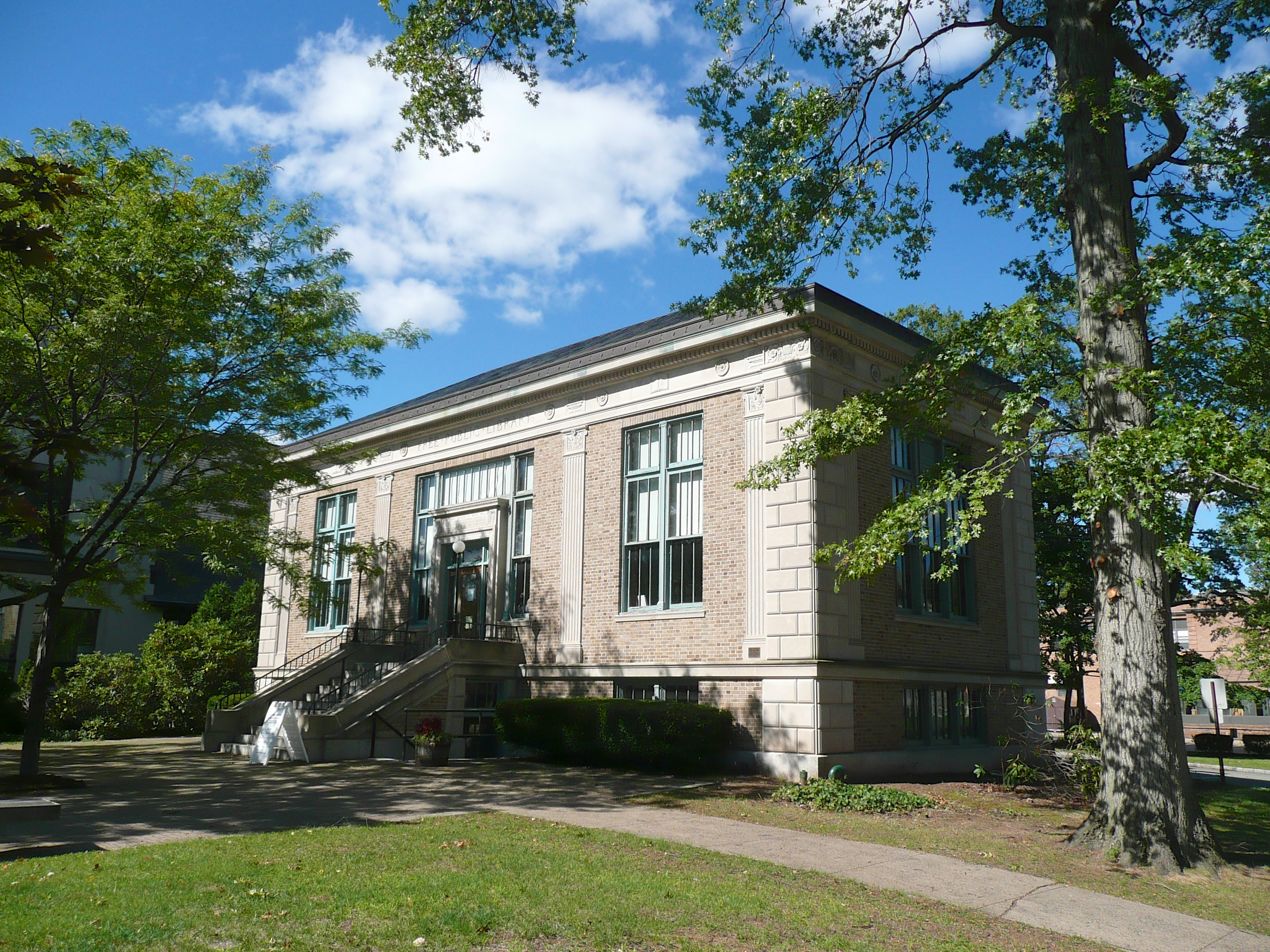
Montclair Public Library, Bellevue Avenue Branch, completed in 1914, as Nelson & Van Wagenen.

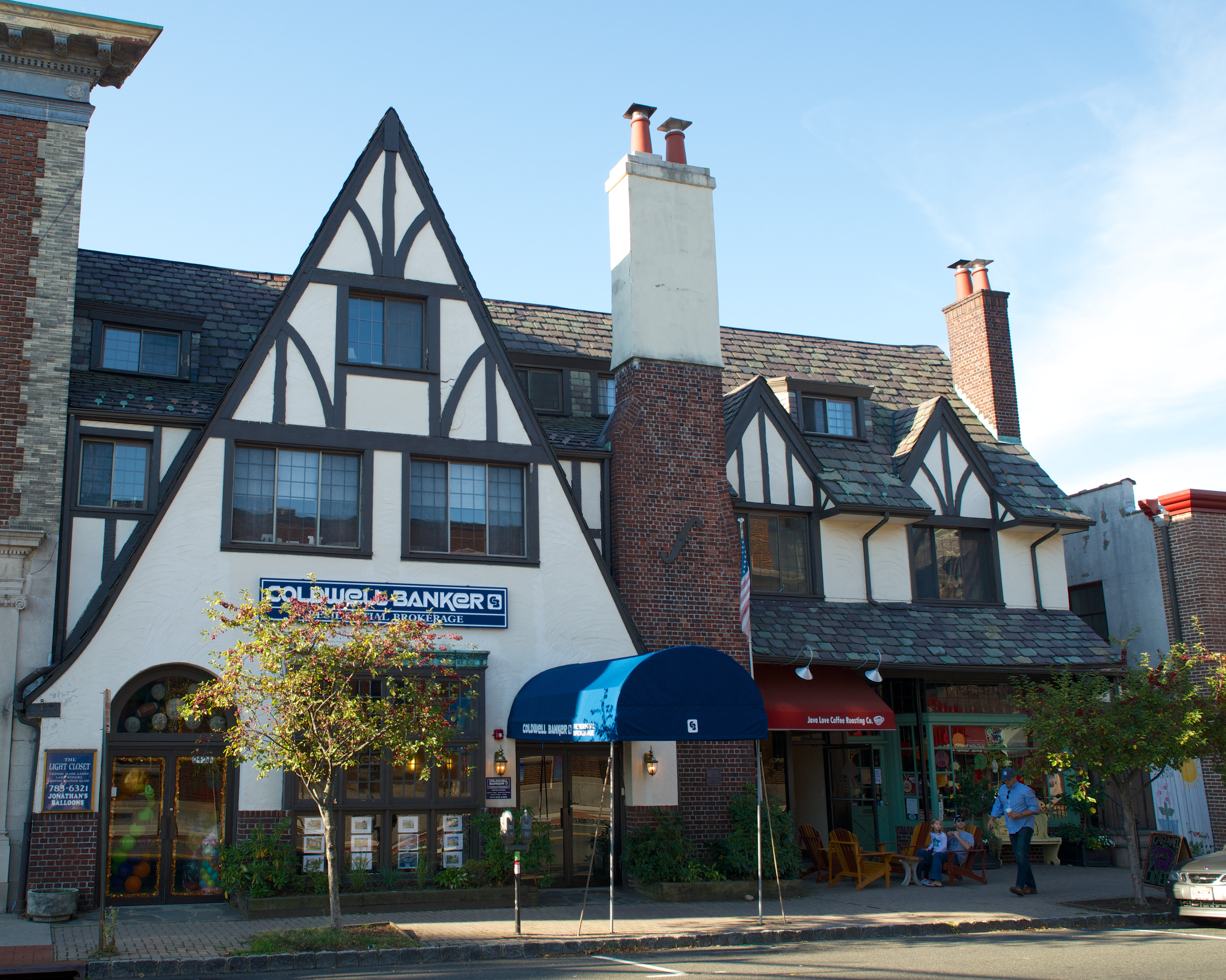
Post Office Building, Upper Montclair, New Jersey, completed in 1918.

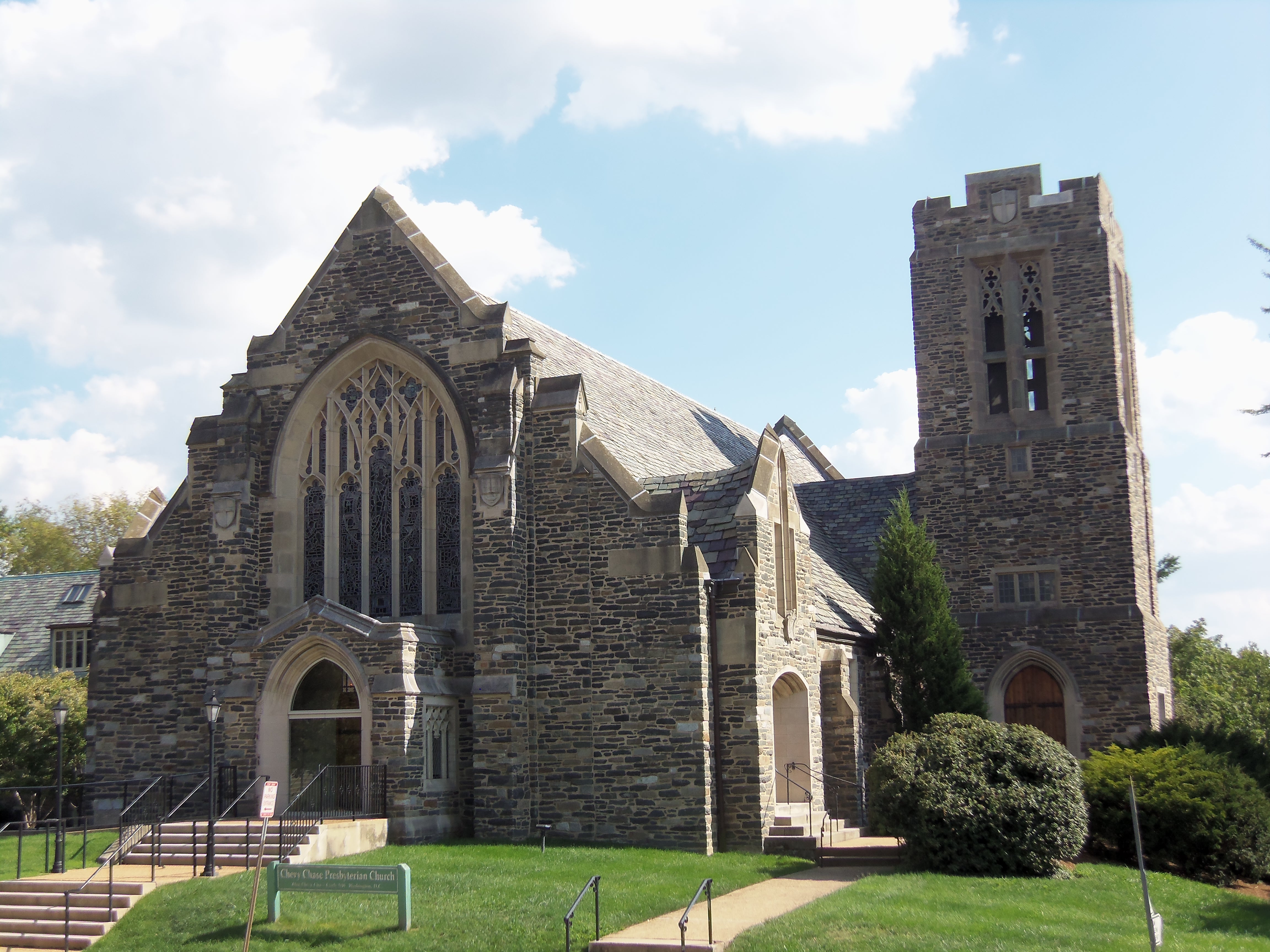
Chevy Chase Presbyterian Church, Washington DC, completed in 1922.

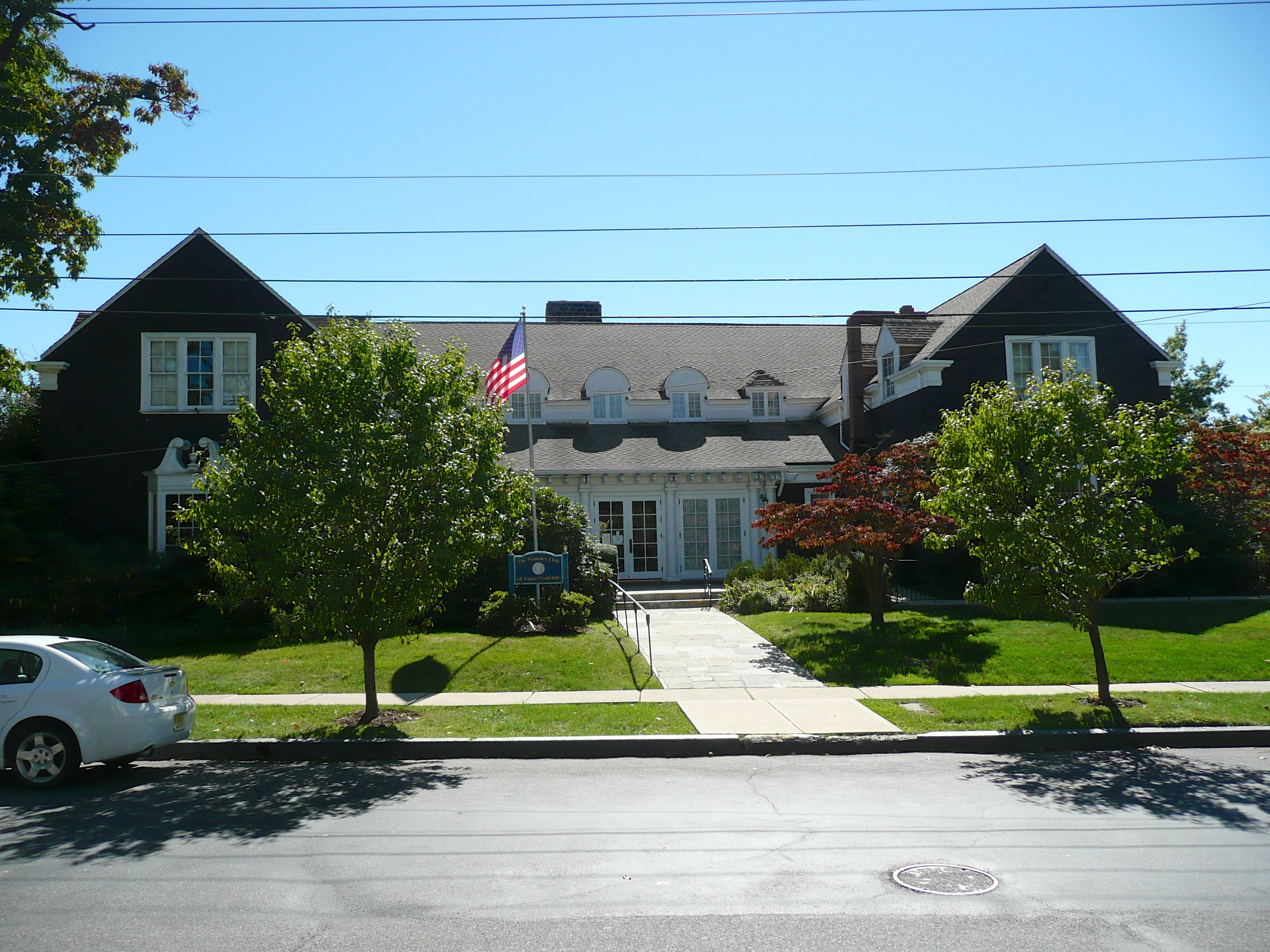
Woman's Club of Upper Montclair Clubhouse, completed in 1924.

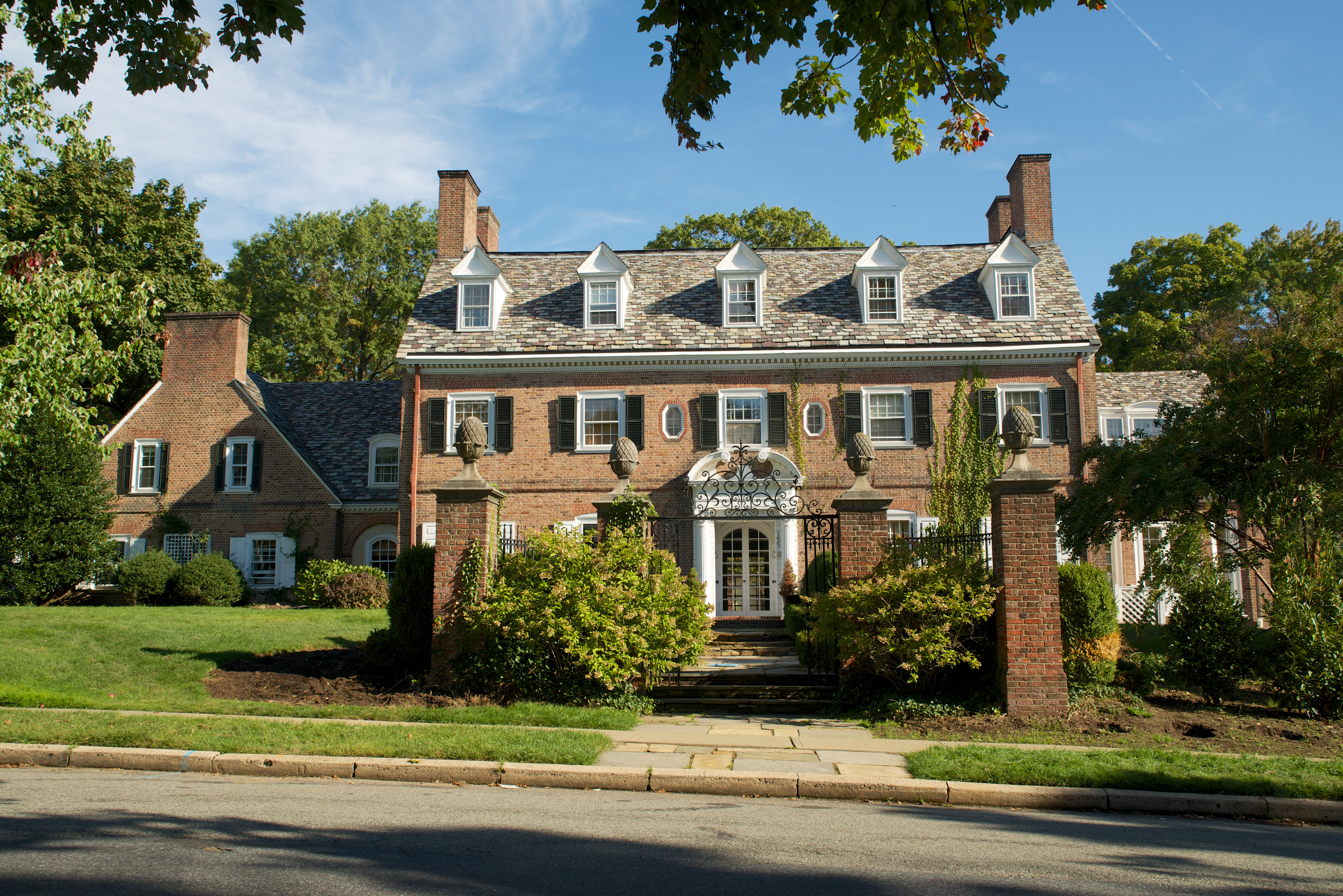
The Anchorage, Montclair, New Jersey, completed in 1930.

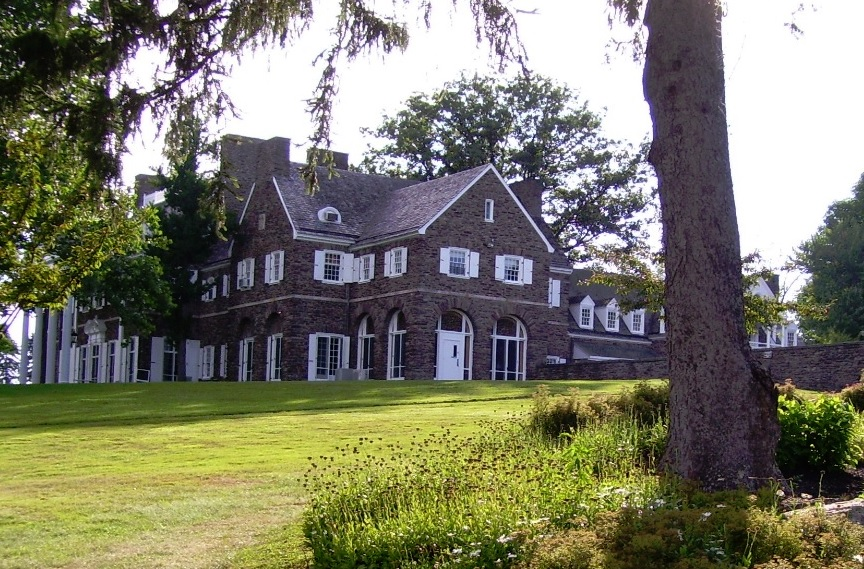
Hayfield Farm, Lehman Twp., Pennsylvania, completed in 1934.
