= Post Office Building, Upper Montclair =

- U.S. National Register of Historic Places
- New Jersey Register of Historic Places
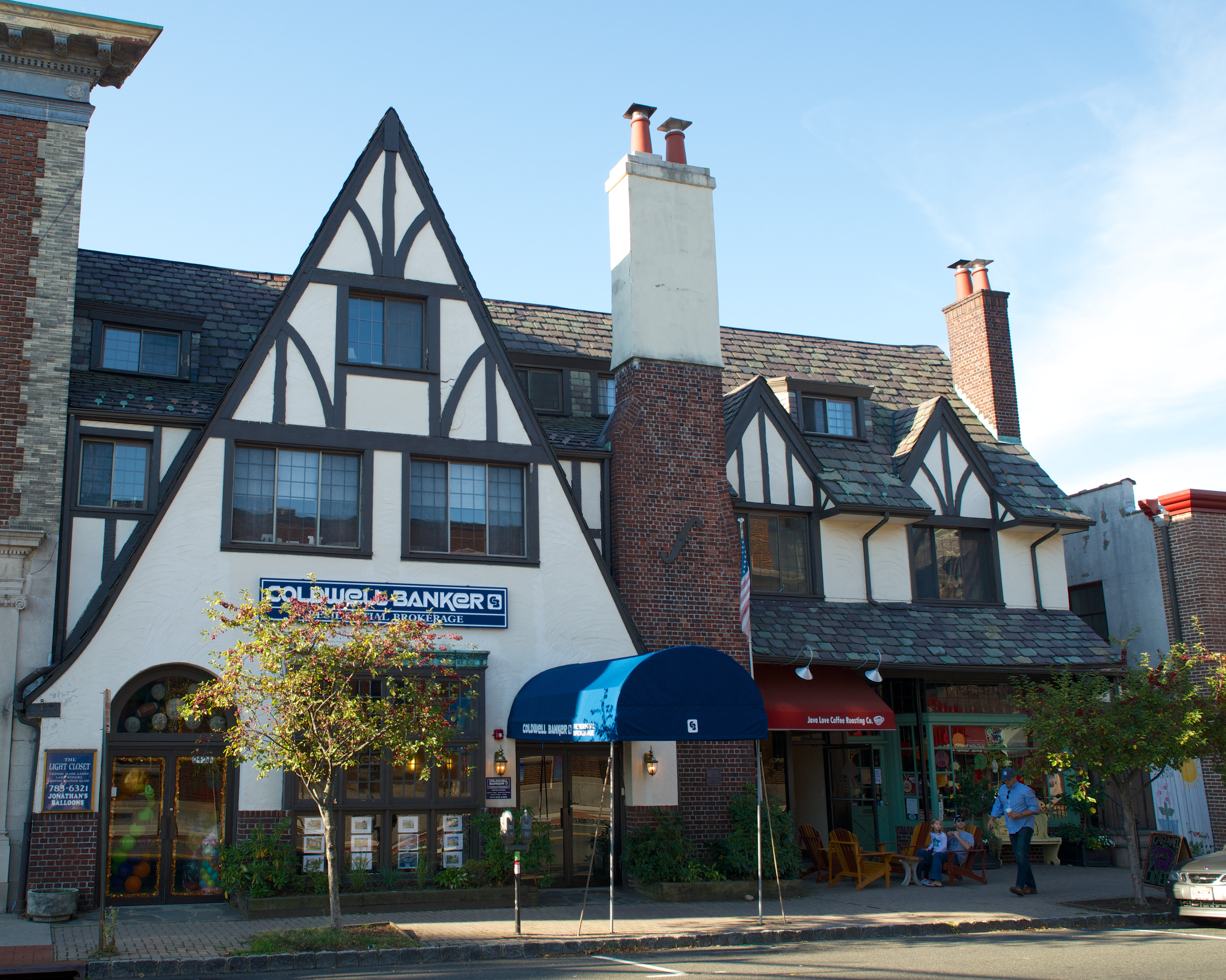

- Location within Essex County, New Jersey Location within New Jersey Location within the United States
- Location: 242-244 Bellevue Avenue, Montclair, New Jersey
- Coordinates: 40°50′28″N 74°12′33″W
- Area: less than one acre
- Built: 1918
- Architect: Francis A. Nelson
- Architectural style: Tudor Revival
- MPS: Montclair MRA
- NRHP reference No.: 86003012
- NJRHP No.: 1190

Significant dates
- Added to NRHP: July 1, 1988
- Designated NJRHP: September 29, 1986

Post Office Building, Upper Montclair, also known as the Gumersall Building, is located in Montclair, Essex County, New Jersey, United States. Designed by the architect Francis A. Nelson, the building was built in 1918 and was added to the National Register of Historic Places on July 1, 1988.

== See also ==
- National Register of Historic Places listings in Essex County, New Jersey
