= Lehman Township, Luzerne County, Pennsylvania =

Township in Pennsylvania, US

Coordinates: 41°19′00″N 75°59′53″W

- Township
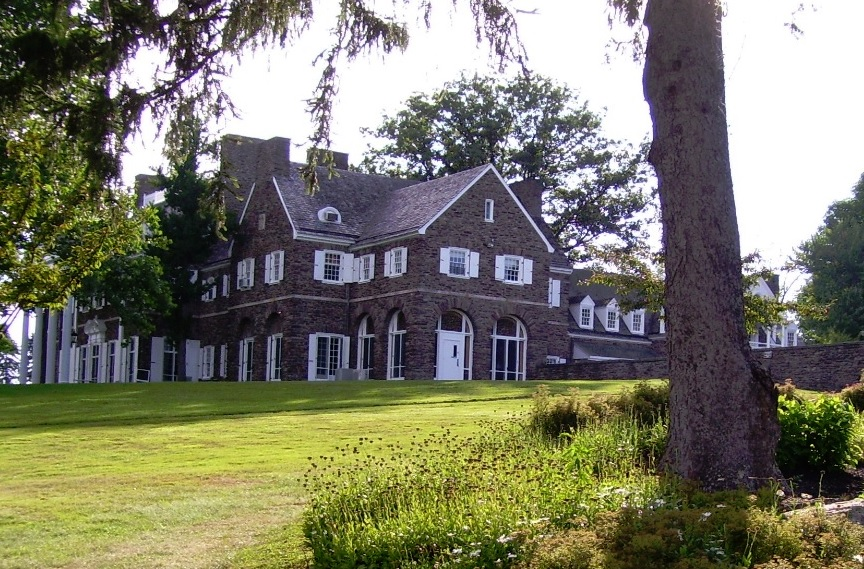
- Penn State Wilkes-Barre, Lehman Township

- Seal

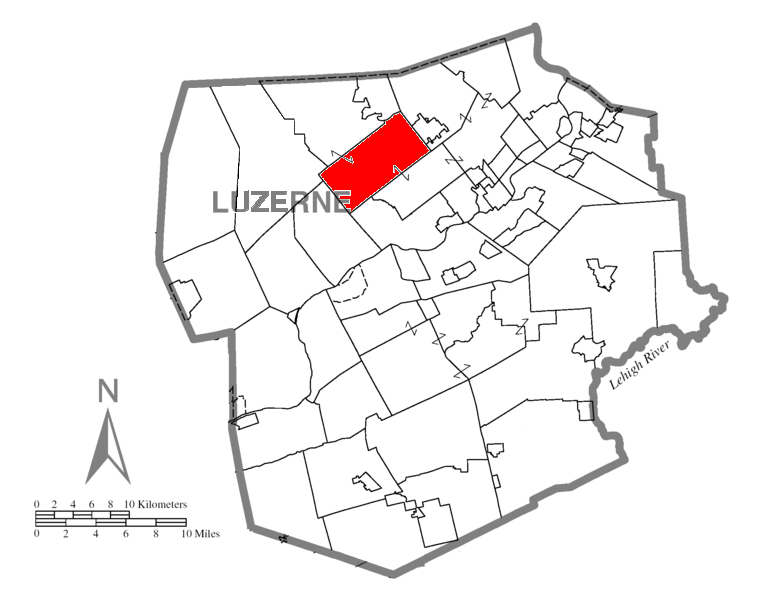
- Map of Luzerne County highlighting Lehman Township

- Map of Pennsylvania highlighting Luzerne County
- Country: United States
- State: Pennsylvania
- County: Luzerne
- Incorporated: 1829

Area
  - Total: 23.21 sq mi (60.11 km^{2})
  - Land: 21.94 sq mi (56.82 km^{2})
  - Water: 1.27 sq mi (3.29 km^{2})

Population (2020)
  - Total: 3,342 ▼
  - Estimate (2021): 3,364
  - Density: 157.5/sq mi (60.82/km^{2})
- Time zone: UTC-5 (Eastern (EST))
  - Summer (DST): UTC-4 (EDT)
- FIPS code: 42-079-42504
- Website: lehmantwp.com

Lehman Township is a township in Luzerne County, Pennsylvania, United States. The township is part of the Back Mountain (a 118 square mile region in northern Luzerne County). The campus of Penn State Wilkes-Barre is located at the Hayfield Farms on Old Route 115 in Lehman Township. The township population was 3,342 at the 2020 census.

== History ==
An old map of Lehman Township

=== Native American raids ===
On March 28, 1780, John Rogers and Asa Upson were producing sugar a short distance above the mouth of Hunlock Creek, when they were suddenly surrounded and captured by Native Americans. Upson was killed and Rogers was carried off. The attackers then proceeded to where Abram Pike was making sugar (near the modern-day Village of Pikes Creek); they captured Pike and his wife.

The following day, the Native Americans advanced on the Village of Orange, where they captured Moses Van Campen, his father, and Peter Pence. The captors killed Moses’ father. They transported the prisoners to the mouth of Wysox Creek, where John Rogers managed to steal a knife from one of the Native Americans; he cut his fellow prisoners loose. The detainees proceeded to attack their captors. Some Native Americans were killed in the struggle while others managed to escape.

=== Establishment ===
Nehemiah Ide and Jeremiah Brown are believed to be the first white settlers in modern-day Lehman Township; they moved to the region in 1801. Lehman Township was formed from a section of Dallas Township in 1829; it is named in honor of Dr. William Lehman.

== Geography ==
According to the United States Census Bureau, the township has a total area of 23.2 square miles (60.1 km^{2}), of which 21.9 square miles (56.8 km^{2}) is land and 1.3 square miles (3.3 km^{2}), or 5.47%, is water. It is drained by the Susquehanna River via Harveys, Hunlock, and Huntsville creeks. Other bodies of water include Lake Silkworth, Pikes Creek Reservoir, and Huntsville Reservoir. The township consists of several small villages: Huntsville (also in Jackson Township), Lehman, Meeker, and Silkworth. PA 29, PA 118, and PA 415 are a few major routes in the community. Most of the municipality consists of hills, thick forests, and farmland.

=== Neighboring municipalities ===
- Dallas (east)
- Dallas Township (east and northeast)
- Harveys Lake (north)
- Lake Township (northwest)
- Ross Township (west)
- Hunlock Township (southwest)
- Plymouth Township (south)
- Jackson Township (southeast)

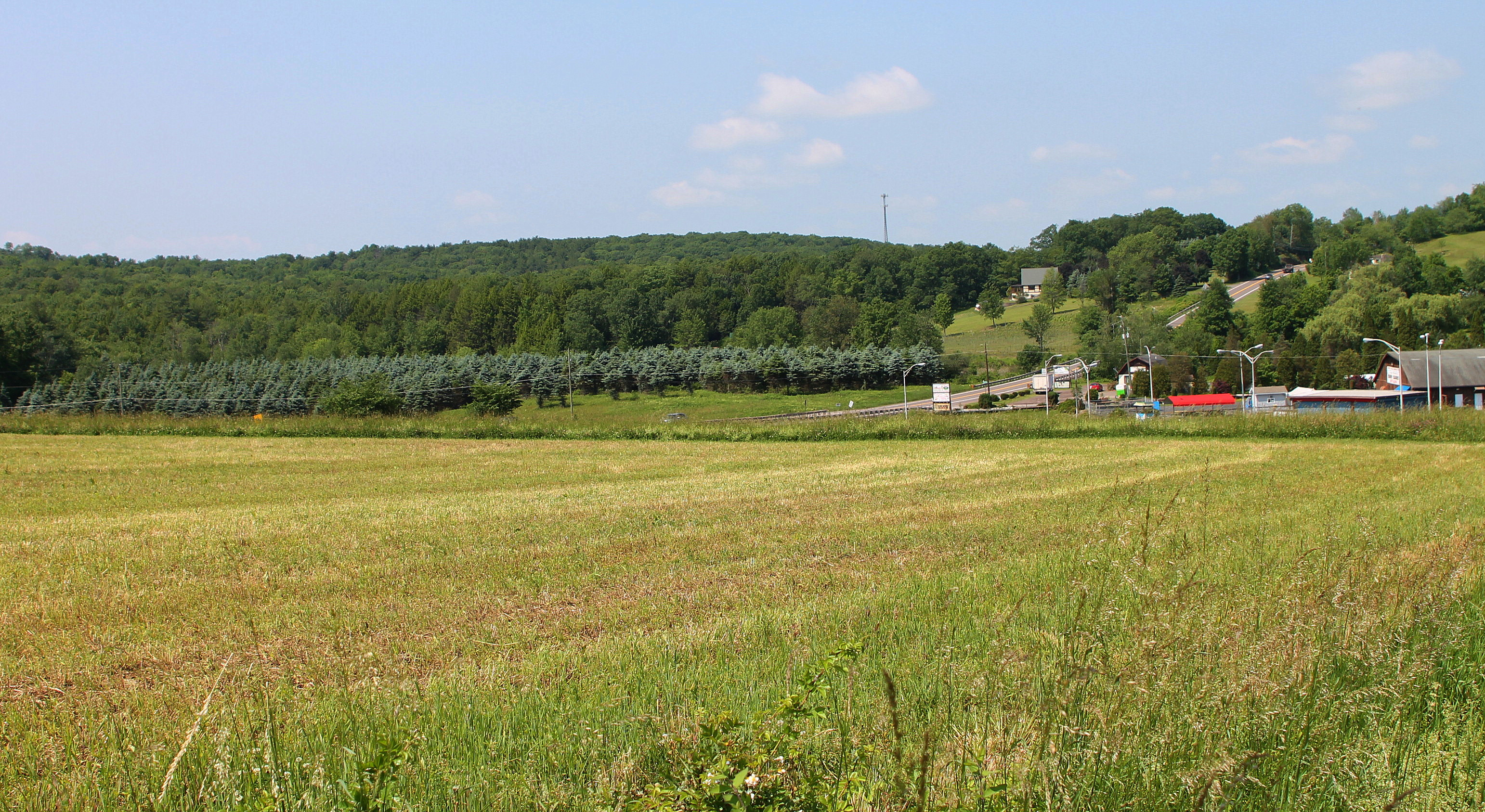
Scenery of Lehman Township

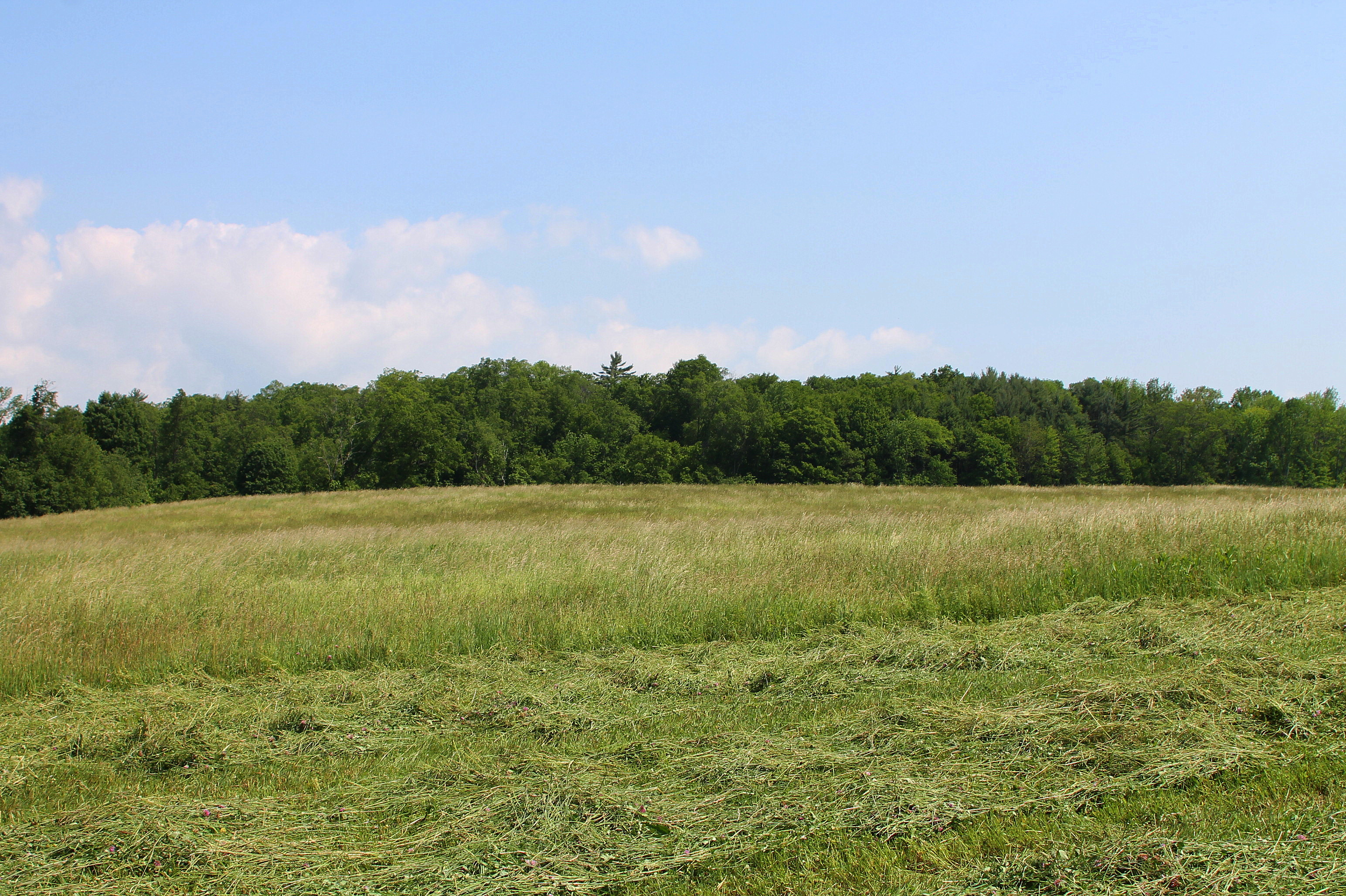
Fields and woods in Lehman Township

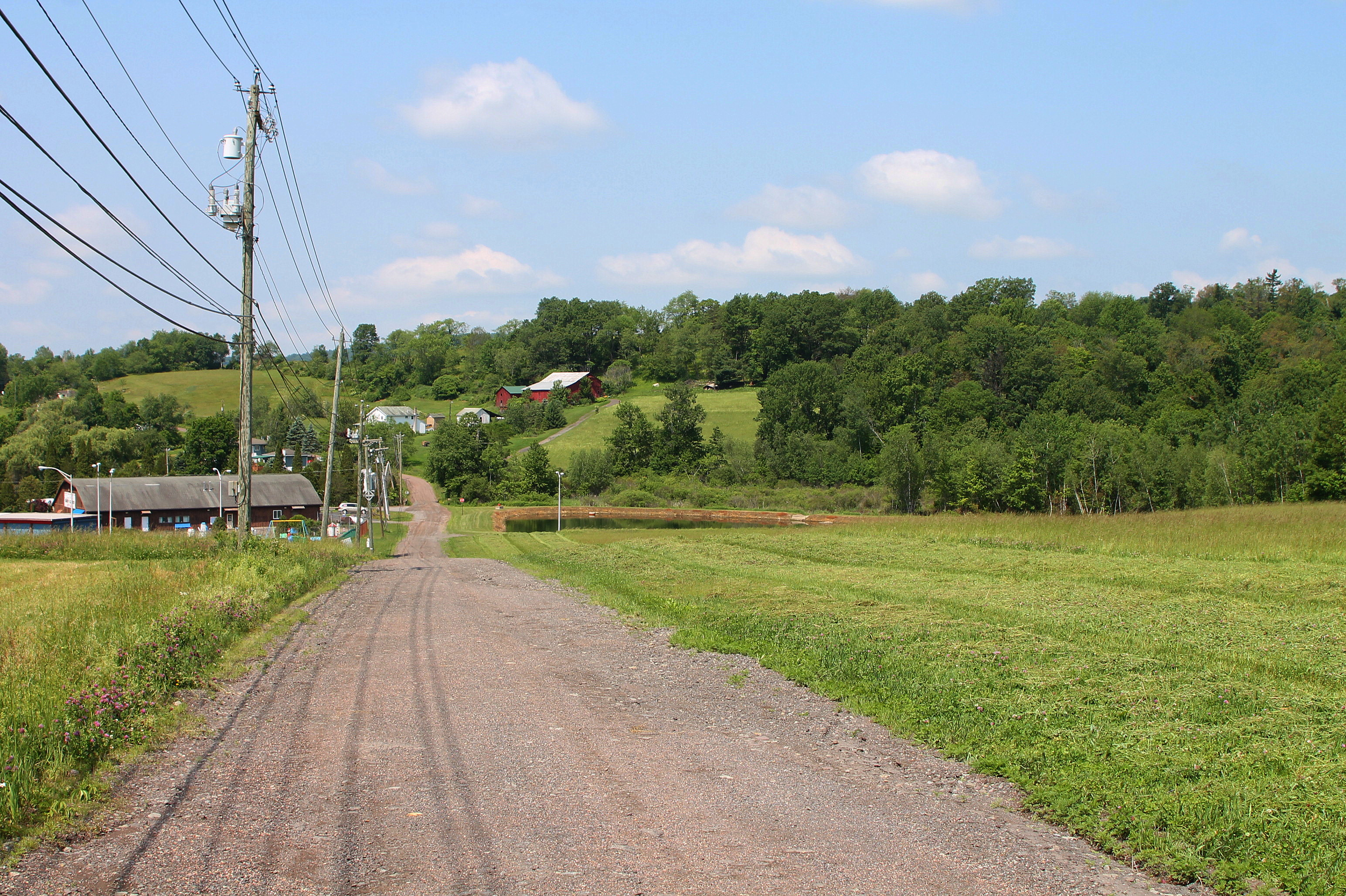
Cornell Road looking west in Lehman Township

== Demographics ==
Historical population
Census	Pop.	Note	%±
2000	3,206		—
2010	3,508		9.4%
2020	3,342		−4.7%
2021 (est.)	3,364		0.7%
U.S. Decennial Census

As of the census of 2000, there were 3,206 people, 1,226 households, and 924 families residing in the township. The population density was 148.0 inhabitants per square mile (57.1/km^{2}). There were 1,403 housing units at an average density of 64.8 per square mile (25.0/km^{2}). The racial makeup of the township was 98.35% White, 0.47% African American, 0.28% Native American, 0.53% Asian, and 0.37% from two or more races. Hispanic or Latino of any race were 0.16% of the population.

There were 1,226 households, out of which 30.8% had children under the age of 18 living with them, 63.1% were married couples living together, 8.5% had a female householder with no husband present, and 24.6% were non-families. 20.3% of all households were made up of individuals, and 9.2% had someone living alone who was 65 years of age or older. The average household size was 2.59 and the average family size was 2.99.

In the township the population was spread out, with 22.9% under the age of 18, 7.3% from 18 to 24, 27.4% from 25 to 44, 28.5% from 45 to 64, and 13.9% who were 65 years of age or older. The median age was 40 years. For every 100 females, there were 96.3 males. For every 100 females age 18 and over, there were 95.2 males.

The median income for a household in the township was $43,060, and the median income for a family was $46,708. Males had a median income of $34,256 versus $25,710 for females. The per capita income for the township was $20,312. About 7.8% of families and 8.3% of the population were below the poverty line, including 8.4% of those under age 18 and 13.0% of those age 65 or over.

The census of 2000 also reported that residents of Lehman, Pennsylvania had the longest commute in the country of communities with at least 1,000 workers. The mean travel time for commuters was 60 minutes.

== Notable people ==
- Lisa Baker, state senator
- Raye Hollitt, American actress; one of the original cast members of American Gladiators
- Jay McCarroll, fashion designer; season one winner of Project Runway on Bravo
