= Lewis Run (Roaring Brook tributary) =

Lewis Run Unt to Roaring Brook
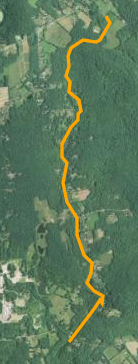
- satellite map of Lewis Run

Physical characteristics
- Source
  - location: southeastern Ross Township, Luzerne County, Pennsylvania
  - elevation: between 1,200 and 1,220 feet (370 and 370 m)
- Mouth
  - location: Roaring Brook in Hunlock Township, Luzerne County, Pennsylvania
  - coordinates: 41°15′18″N 76°07′04″W
  - elevation: 958 ft (292 m)
- Length: 3.6 mi (5.8 km)

Basin features
- Progression: Roaring Brook → Hunlock Creek → Susquehanna River → Chesapeake Bay

Lewis Run (also known as Unt to Roaring Brook) is a tributary of Roaring Brook in Luzerne County, Pennsylvania, in the United States. It is approximately 3.6 miles (5.8 km) long and flows through Ross Township and Hunlock Township. A relatively small amount on non-municipal sewage is discharged into the stream. However, it is not considered to be impaired and wild trout naturally reproduce within it.

== Course ==
Lewis Run begins in southeastern Ross Township. It flows south-southeast for a few hundred feet before turning southwest. The stream then turns west and enters a valley. It then gradually turns south and flows in a generally southwardly direction for a few miles, flowing in its valley alongside State Route 4029 and entering Hunlock Township. The stream eventually turns southwest. After several tenths of a mile, it crosses State Route 4026 and reaches its confluence with Roaring Brook.

Lewis Run joins Roaring Brook on the latter stream's right bank.

== Geography and geology ==
The elevation near the mouth of Lewis Run is 958 feet (292 m) above sea level. The elevation near the stream's source is between 1,200 and 1,220 feet (370 and 370 m) above sea level.

There is one feature on Lewis Run that is identified as a "problem area" by the Luzerne County Conservation District. This feature's identifier is HUN015. The feature consists of two fallen trees across the stream. However, there is a relatively little erosion or possibly even none at the site.

== Watershed and hydrology ==
Lewis Run is entirely within the United States Geological Survey quadrangle of Harveys Lake.

An establishment known as Sweet Valley Mobile Home Villa has an NPDES permit to discharge non-municipal sewage into Lewis Run. This discharge is a minor discharge of 10,000 gallons per day. However, the stream is not considered to be impaired.

== History ==
In the Pennsylvania Fish and Boat Commission's list of wild trout waters, Lewis Run is referred to as "Unt to Roaring Brook".

== Biology ==
Wild trout naturally reproduce in Lewis Run from its headwaters downstream to its mouth.

== See also ==
- List of rivers of Pennsylvania
