= The Anchorage (Montclair, New Jersey) =

Historic house in New Jersey, United States

- U.S. National Register of Historic Places
- New Jersey Register of Historic Places
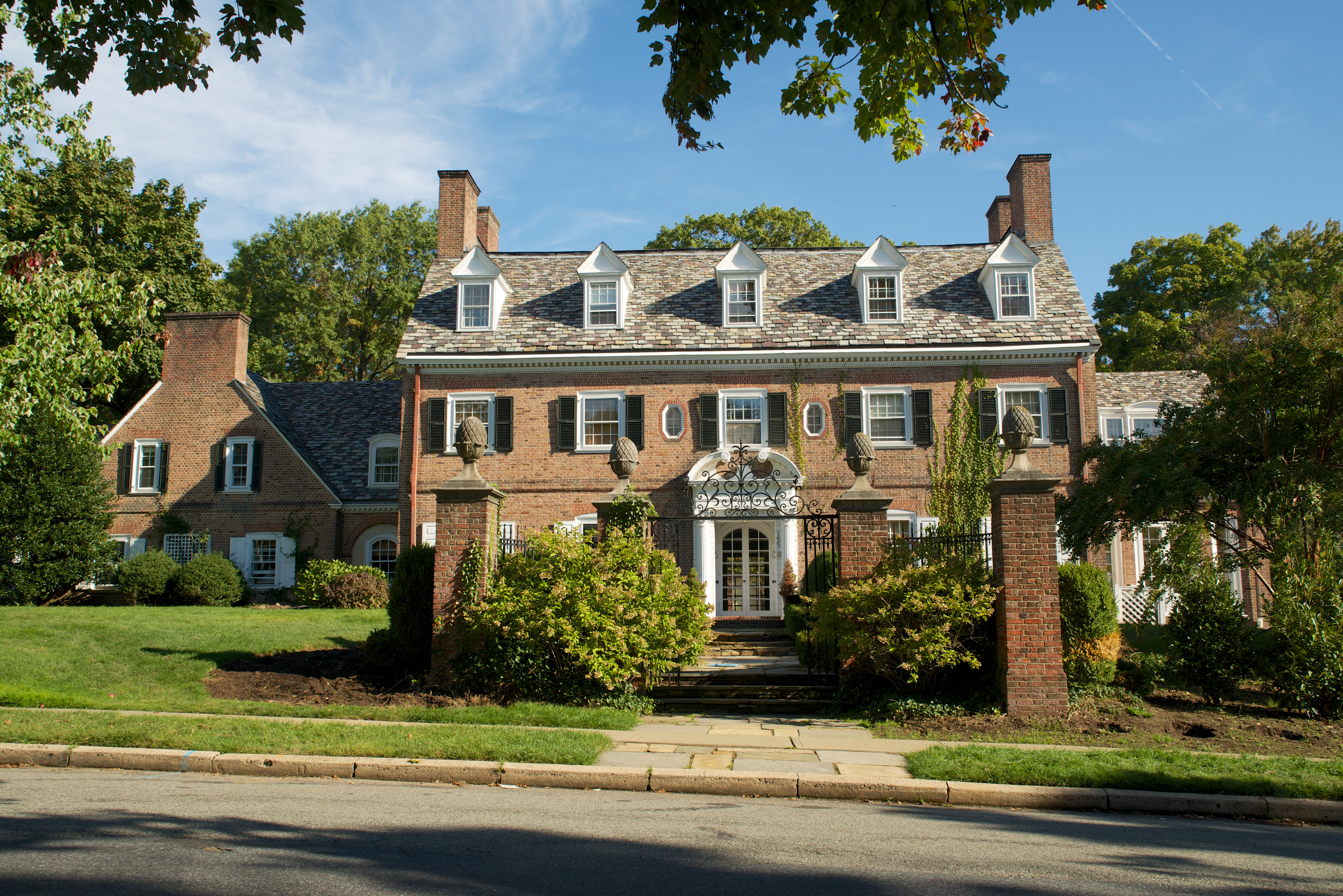

- Location within Essex County, New Jersey Location within New Jersey Location within the United States
- Location: 155 Wildwood Avenue, Montclair, New Jersey
- Coordinates: 40°50′13″N 74°12′15″W
- Built: 1930
- Architect: Francis A. Nelson
- Architectural style: Colonial Revival, Georgian Revival
- MPS: Montclair MRA
- NRHP reference No.: 86003061
- NJRHP No.: 1101

Significant dates
- Added to NRHP: July 1, 1988
- Designated NJRHP: September 29, 1986

The Anchorage, also known as the Farlie House, is a Colonial Revival mansion located in Montclair, Essex County, New Jersey, United States. Designed by the architect Francis A. Nelson, the house was built in 1930 and was added to the National Register of Historic Places on July 1, 1988, for its significance in architecture. It was listed in the Montclair Architects section of the Historic Resources of Montclair Multiple Property Submission (MPS).

== History ==
The double-plot of land that would become The Anchorage was purchased by Louis Vaughn, a New York Law School educated lawyer, in 1907, when he moved to Montclair with his wife, Edith, and daughter, Elanor, building a house on the property named Bonnie Brae. In 1928 the property hosted 500 guests for Elanor's debutante. After Louis died in 1929, Edith hired architect Francis A. Nelson to construct a smaller house in the property's rose garden that Louis and Edith spent most of their time. Based on the Virginia Byrd family's tidewater Westover Plantation , the new home was dubbed The Anchorage. Its bricks were made of mud from the James River, its wrought iron fence was hand crafted, and the slate for the roof was imported. Edith also hired famed landscape architect Ralph Hancock to design a small garden.

Edith would die in 1934, and the property would be purchased by Charles P. Montgomery, the executive vice president of Nabisco and his wife Irene. The house was sold in 1950 to Robert Lape Smith, president of the Ban-Cad corporation, and his wife Grace. The property gained some notoriety when their daughter Roberta won the 1954 National Horse Show with a four year old Chestnut, "Miss Laurel". Roberta would go on to win over 200 equestrian awards before dying in 1956 at the age of 18. In the 1960s the house was bought by Dr. Sindey H. Joffe, a New York lawyer in the midst of a divorce, to separate from his New York-based wife Guisse. Joffe, who served in the United States Army Medical Corps during World War II, made a fortune patenting a chemical solution for preserving flowers.

From 1996 to 2000 William Farlie Jr., the mayor of Montclair at the time, lived on the property, earning its more recent moniker Farlie House.

== See also ==
- National Register of Historic Places listings in Essex County, New Jersey
