= Lewis Run =

Lewis Run may refer to:

- Lewis Run, Pennsylvania, a borough in McKean County, Pennsylvania
- Lewis Run (Roaring Brook tributary), a stream in Luzerne County, Pennsylvania
