= Roaring Brook (Hunlock Creek tributary) =

Roaring Brook Roaring Brook Creek
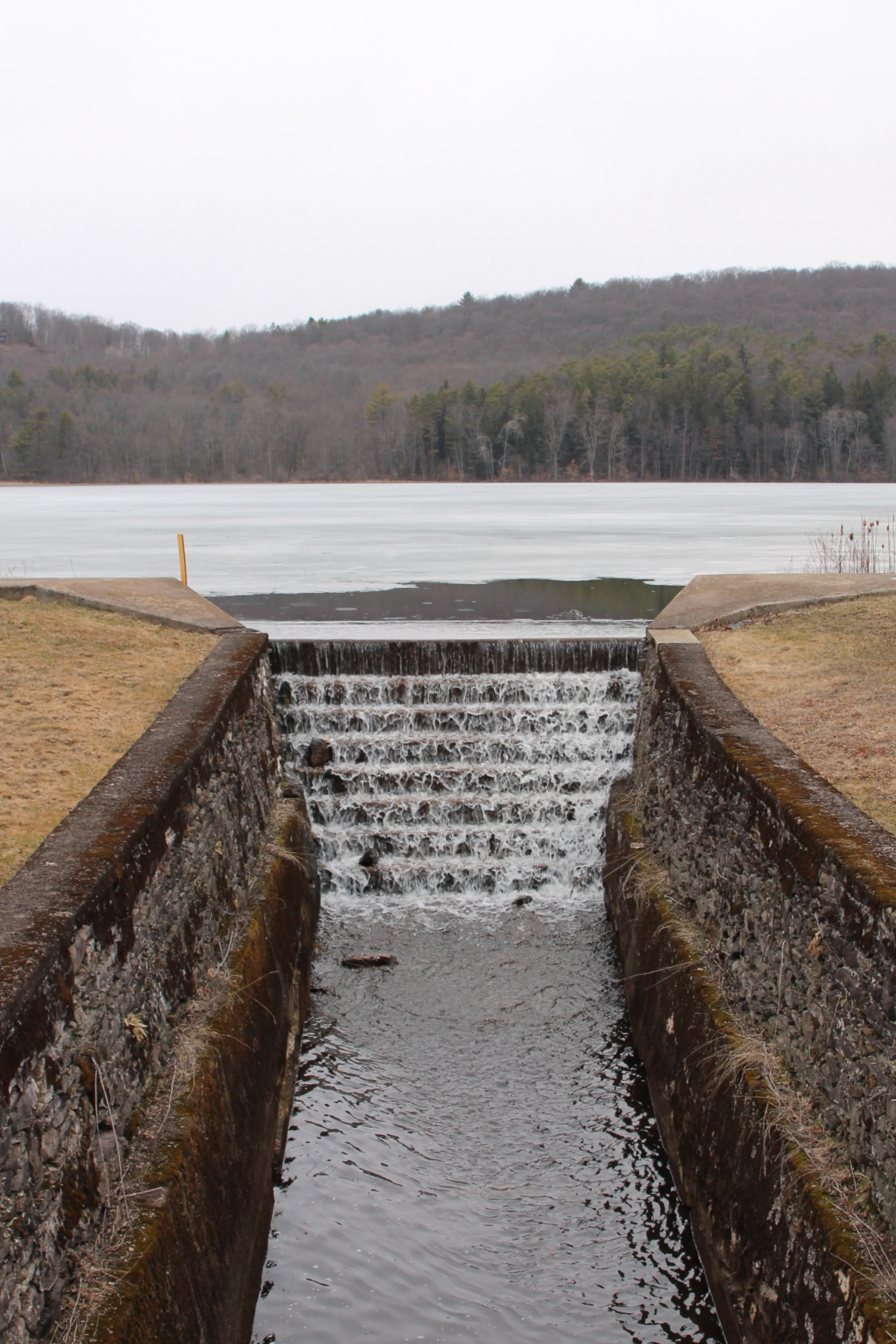
- Headwaters of Roaring Brook

Physical characteristics
- Source
  - location: Harris Pond in Ross Township, Luzerne County, Pennsylvania
  - elevation: between 1,260 and 1,280 feet (380 and 390 m)
- Mouth
  - location: Hunlock Creek in Hunlock Township, Luzerne County, Pennsylvania
  - coordinates: 41°14′25″N 76°06′09″W
  - elevation: 751 ft (229 m)
- Length: 5.0 mi (8.0 km)
- Basin size: 6.17 mi^{2} (16.0 km^{2})

Basin features
- Progression: Hunlock Creek → Susquehanna River → Chesapeake Bay
- Tributaries
  - left: Lewis Run

Roaring Brook (also known as Roaring Brook Creek) is a tributary of Hunlock Creek in Luzerne County, Pennsylvania, in the United States. It is approximately 5.0 miles (8.0 km) long and flows through Ross Township and Hunlock Township. The watershed of the stream has an area of 6.17 square miles (16.0 km^{2}). It has one named tributary, which is known as Lewis Run. Additionally, a dammed pond known as Harris Pond is located at the stream's headwaters. The Roaring Brook Swamp, which is listed as a Locally Significant Area on the Luzerne County Natural Areas Inventory, is also located in the watershed.

Roaring Brook is designated as a Least Disturbed Stream. It is in the ridge and valley physiographic province. The surficial geology in the stream's vicinity consists of Wisconsinan Till, bedrock, Wisconsinan Ice Contact-Stratified Drift, alluvium, and sand and gravel pits.

== Course ==
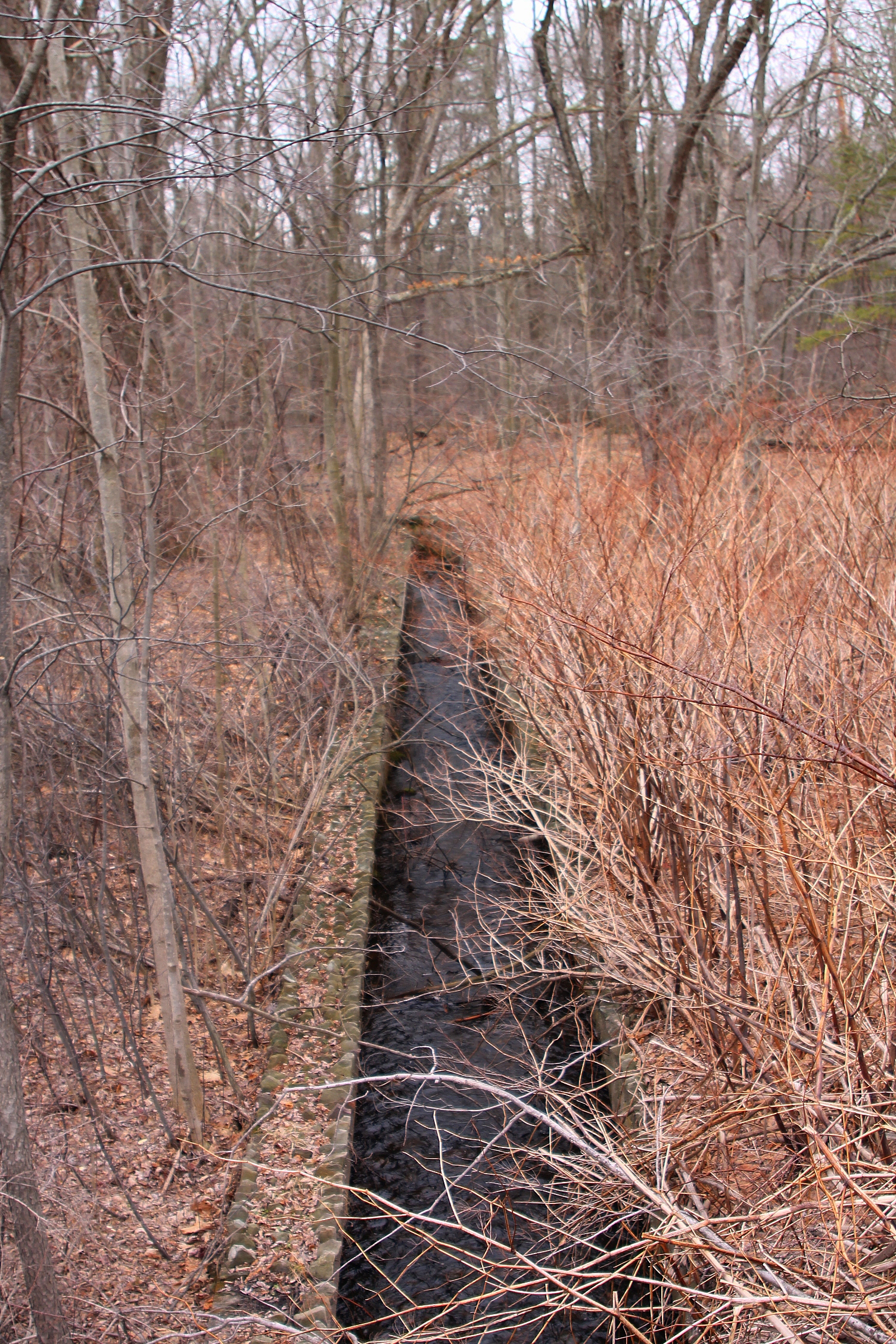
Roaring Brook looking downstream at its headwaters

Roaring Brook begins in Harris Pond in Ross Township. It flows for a few miles in a shallow valley before exiting Ross Township. Upon leaving Ross Township, the stream enters Hunlock Township. It gradually turns southeast, passing by several ponds or small lakes before turning south-southeast flowing through the community of Roaring Brook. A short distance downstream of Roaring Brook, the stream receives its only named tributary, Lewis Run, from the left. The stream then turns southwest for a short distance and enters a much deeper and narrower valley. It this valley, it turns south-southeast for more than a mile before it reaches its confluence with Hunlock Creek.

Roaring Brook joins Hunlock Creek 3.99 miles (6.42 km) upstream of its mouth.

== Hydrology, geography, and geology ==
The elevation near the mouth of Roaring Brook is 751 feet (229 m) above sea level. The elevation of the stream's source is between 1,260 and 1,280 feet (380 and 390 m) above sea level.

The surficial geology in the vicinity of Roaring Brook mainly features a glacial or resedimented till known as Wisconsinan Till. However, there are areas of bedrock consisting of sandstone and shale around the edges of the stream's valley. There is a large patch of Wisconsinan Ice-Contact Stratified Drift in the stream's lower reaches and a much smaller patch of alluvium near its headwaters. There is also a sand and gravel pit along the creek. This pit is the only such pit in the United States Geological Survey quadrangle of Sweet Valley.

Roaring Brook is in the Susquehanna Valley Section of the ridge and valley physiographic province. A strip mine is located along Roaring Brook in its lower reaches.

There are no instances of point source pollution in the watershed of Roaring Brook.

== Watershed ==
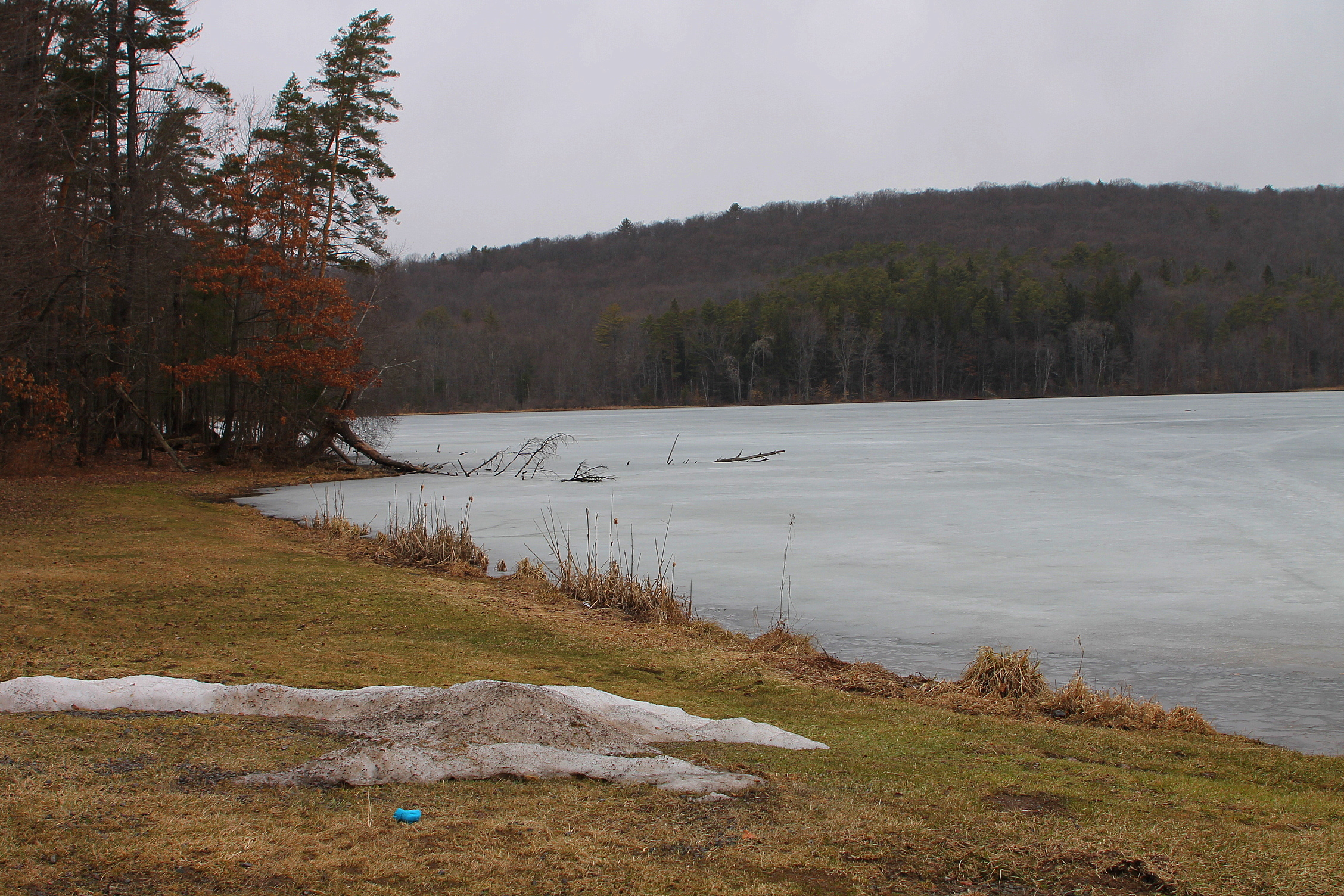
Harris Pond

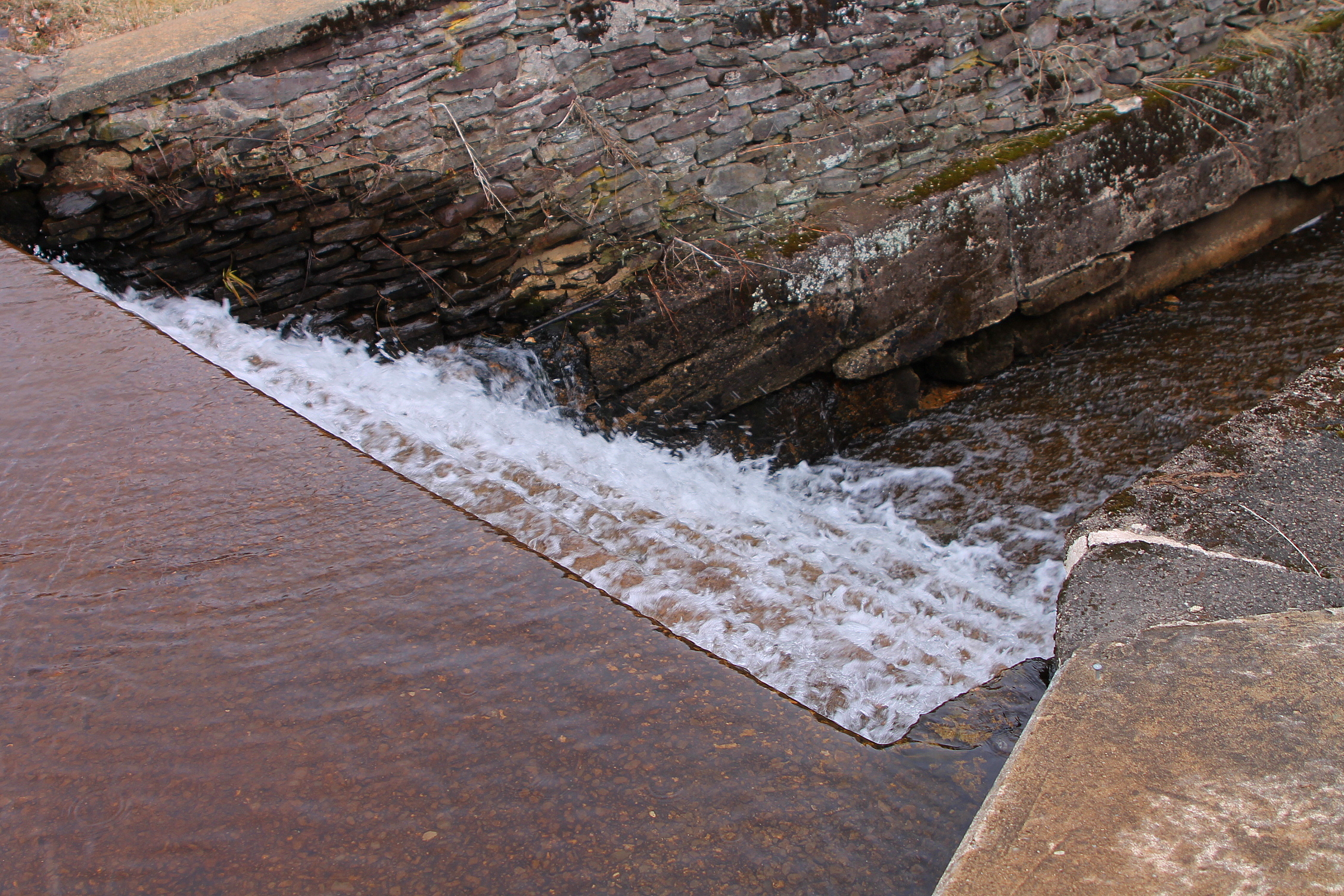
Harris Pond Dam

The watershed of Roaring Brook has an area of 6.17 square miles (16.0 km^{2}). The stream's mouth is in the United States Geological Survey quadrangle of Nanticoke. However, its source is in the quadrangle of Sweet Valley. The stream also passes through the quadrangle of Harveys Lake.

Roaring Brook is classified as a Least Disturbed Stream by the Pennsylvania Natural Heritage Program. Such streams are described as "high-quality stream segments" that "ideally have little disturbance from human influences and demonstrate natural ecological function".

At most 0.75 percent of the watershed of Roaring Brook is on developed land. No more than 28 percent of the watershed is on cropland, of which no more than 6 percent is row crops and no more than 22 percent is non-row crops. At least 70 percent of the watershed is forested.

No more than 1 percent of the riparian area of Roaring Brook is developed. No more than 20 percent is agricultural land and at least 75 percent is forested. There are fewer than ten road crossings in the watershed.

The headwaters of Roaring Brook are in a 30-acre lake known as Harris Pond. It is dammed by the Harris Pond Dam, which is made from earth, concrete, and masonry. It is approximately 10 feet (3.0 m) high and 135 feet (41 m) long (including the spillway). As of 1981, the dam is in relatively good condition.

== History ==
Roaring Brook was entered into the Geographic Names Information System on August 2, 1979. Its identifier in the Geographic Names Information System is 1185165.

== Biology ==
Wild trout naturally reproduce in Roaring Brook from its headwaters downstream to its mouth.

A swamp known as Roaring Brook Swamp is situated along the eastern side of Roaring Brook in its upper reaches in Ross Township. The swamp is listed as a Locally Significant Area on the Luzerne County Natural Areas Inventory. It is classified as a third-growth mixed broadleaf and conifer swamp. The swamp contains marshy areas as well as old beaver dams.

The main tree species in the overstory of Roaring Brook Swamp include hemlock, white pine, yellow birch, red maple, and black ash. The plants in the swamp's understory include arrow-wood, silky dogwood, and winterberry. On the ground, the planets include sedges, wood fern, cinnamon fern, skunk cabbage, sphagnum moss, bedstraw, jewelweed, goldenrod, and horsetail.

Bird species inhabiting the Roaring Brook Swamp include eastern peewee, tufted titmouse, veery, ovenbird, red-eyed vireo, and Louisiana waterthrush. Wild trout naturally reproduce in Roaring Brook from its headwaters downstream to its mouth.

== See also ==
- List of rivers of Pennsylvania
