= Lehman, Pennsylvania =

Unincorporated community in Pennsylvania, US

- Unincorporated community
- Location within Pennsylvania Location within the United States
- Coordinates: 41°19′01″N 76°01′21″W
- Country: United States
- State: Pennsylvania
- County: Luzerne
- Township: Lehman
- Elevation: 1,312 ft (400 m)
- Time zone: UTC-5 (Eastern (EST))
  - Summer (DST): UTC-4 (EDT)
- ZIP code: 18627
- Area codes: 272 & 570
- GNIS feature ID: 1179164

Lehman is an unincorporated community in Lehman Township, Luzerne County, Pennsylvania, United States. The community is located along Pennsylvania Route 118, 3.4 miles (5.5 km) west-southwest of Dallas. Lehman has a post office with ZIP code 18627, which opened on January 18, 1826.
