= Woman's Club of Upper Montclair =

- U.S. National Register of Historic Places
- New Jersey Register of Historic Places
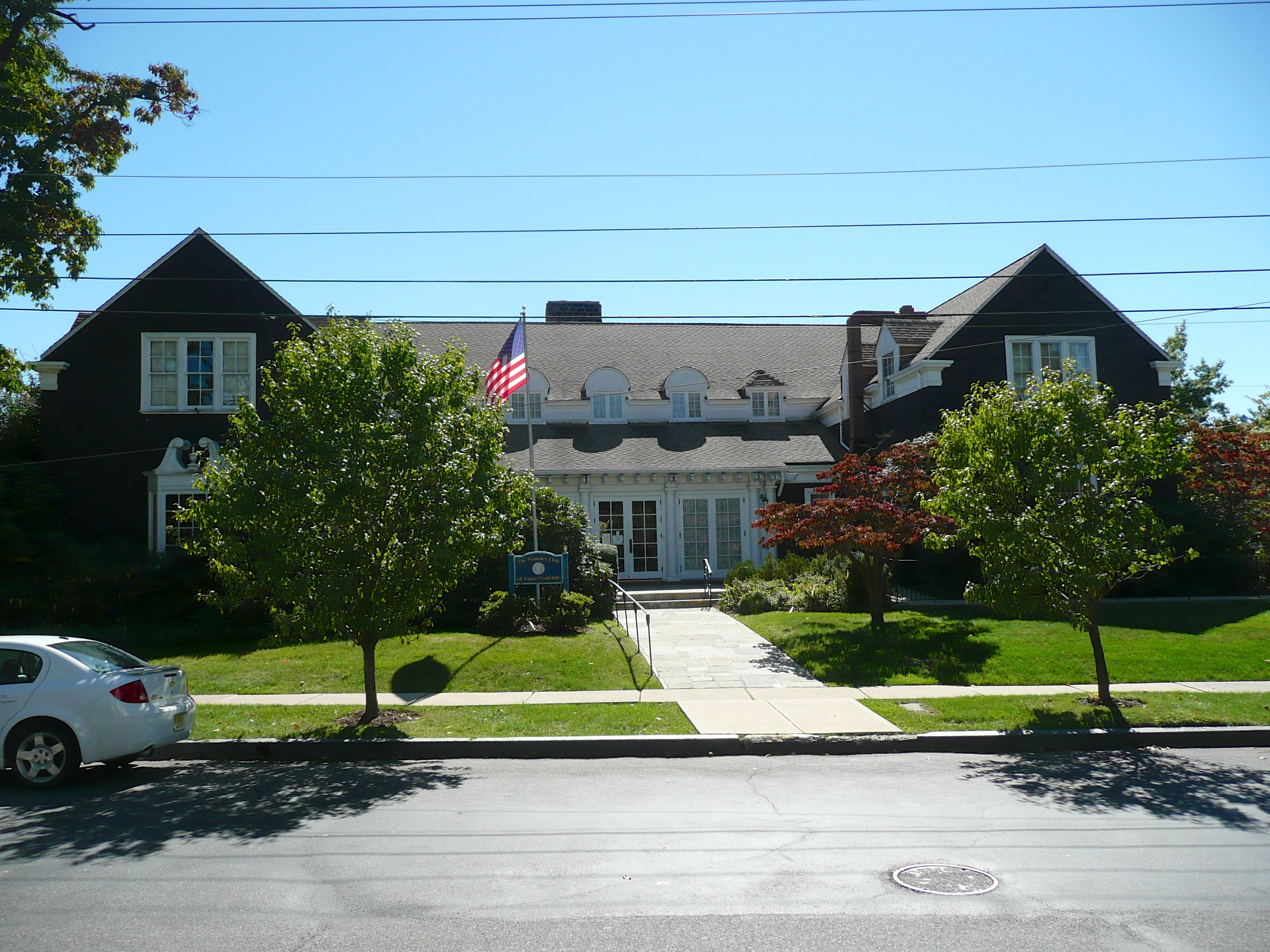
- Clubhouse

- Location within Essex County, New Jersey Location within New Jersey Location within the United States
- Location: 200 Cooper Avenue, Montclair, New Jersey
- Coordinates: 40°50′21″N 74°12′24″W
- Built: 1924
- Architect: Francis A. Nelson
- Architectural style: Colonial Revival
- MPS: Clubhouses of New Jersey Women's Clubs
- NRHP reference No.: 12000594
- NJRHP No.: 5108

Significant dates
- Added to NRHP: September 4, 2012
- Designated NJRHP: July 9, 2012

The Woman's Club of Upper Montclair is a women's club started in 1900 in the Upper Montclair section of the township of Montclair in Essex County, New Jersey, United States. The clubhouse, located at 200 Cooper Avenue, was added to the National Register of Historic Places on September 4, 2012, for its significance in social history from 1924 to 1940. It was listed as part of the Clubhouses of New Jersey Women's Clubs Multiple Property Submission (MPS).

== History ==
The club was started on Thursday, October 4, 1900, led by Mrs. Robert Hoe Dodd (1842–1927). It was called The Thursday Club, after the day of the week when they met. In 1901, the name was changed to the Woman’s Club of Upper Montclair (WCUM) and the club became a member of the New Jersey State Federation of Women's Clubs. They wrote and adopted a constitution on March 31, 1902. The club was incorporated in 1920 and became a member of the General Federation of Women's Clubs in 1921.

== Clubhouse ==
The Colonial Revival clubhouse was designed by architect Francis A. Nelson, a resident of the community, and completed in 1924. The two-story central part has a side-gabled roof and the two-story wings have a front-gabled roof. The entrance features three pairs of French doors.

== See also ==
- List of women's clubs
- National Register of Historic Places listings in Essex County, New Jersey
