= Hunlock Creek, Pennsylvania =

Unincorporated community in Pennsylvania, US

- Unincorporated community
- Location within Pennsylvania Location within the United States
- Coordinates: 41°12′21″N 76°03′58″W
- Country: United States
- State: Pennsylvania
- County: Luzerne
- Township: Hunlock
- Elevation: 528 ft (161 m)
- Time zone: UTC-5 (Eastern (EST))
  - Summer (DST): UTC-4 (EDT)
- ZIP code: 18621
- Area codes: 272 & 570
- GNIS feature ID: 1203858

Hunlock Creek is an unincorporated community in Hunlock Township, Luzerne County, Pennsylvania, United States. The community is located along the Susquehanna River and U.S. Route 11, 3.2 miles (5.1 km) west of Nanticoke. Hunlock Creek has a post office with ZIP code 18621. In 1940, a regional guidebook noted that the town, "its shacks resting in a mountain cleft, is named for the coal-blackened stream that splits it into a number of sections. US 11 parallels the winding river through a long valley that broadens out occasionally to include a cultivated tract on the river flat."
