= Lewis Creek (Flathead River tributary) =

Stream in Montana, U.S.

Coordinates: 47°39′37″N 113°20′24″W

Lewis Creek is a stream in the U.S. state of Montana. It is a tributary to the Flathead River.

Lewis Creek was named after D. H. Lewis, a local ranger.
