= Penn State Wilkes-Barre =

Public college in Lehman Township, Pennsylvania, US

Coordinates: 41°18′29″N 76°0′44″W

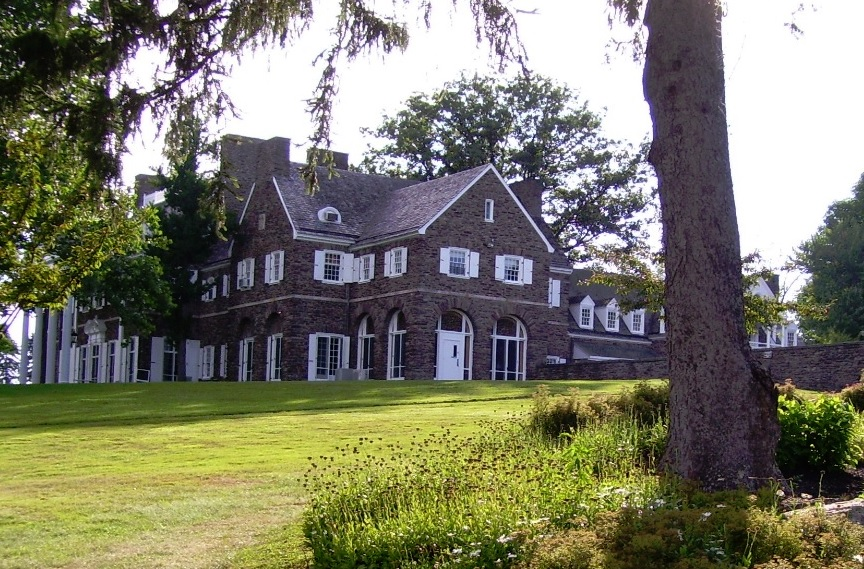
- Hayfield House, Penn State Wilkes-Barre, August 2012
- Type: Public satellite campus
- Established: 1916
- Parent institution: Pennsylvania State University
- Chancellor: Dr. Lynda Goldstein
- President: Neeli Bendapudi
- Provost: Nicholas P. Jones
- Faculty: 55
- Students: 232 (Fall 2025)
- Undergraduates: 232 (Fall 2025)
- Location: Lehman Township, Pennsylvania, U.S.
- Colors: Navy Blue and White
- Sporting affiliations: PSUAC (USCAA)
- Mascot: Nittany Lion
- Website: wilkesbarre.psu.edu/

Penn State Wilkes-Barre is a commonwealth campus of Pennsylvania State University located in Lehman Township, Pennsylvania. The campus was established in 1916, but in May 2025 Penn State officials announced it would close after the Spring 2027 semester, citing low enrollment and financial losses.

== History ==
In May 1915, two Penn State graduates, reacting to the needs of the local anthracite mining industry, proposed the development of a Penn State engineering center in Wilkes-Barre. "King Coal" reigned supreme at that time in the Wyoming Valley and engineers were needed to improve mining methods and worker safety. The response from local citizens and civic organizations was overwhelming, and on November 7, 1916, the Penn State Department of Engineering Extension began offering evening classes for 150 students in what was then Coughlin High School. The new Penn State Department of Engineering Extension offered courses in advanced mathematics, surveying, reinforced concrete and mechanics.

The campus began offering three-year certificates in mechanical, electrical, civil, and mining engineering by 1923; three-year courses in aeronautical and textile engineering and a two-year program in air conditioning were later added.

During World War II, the renamed Pennsylvania State College Wilkes-Barre Technical School Center trained women and older men in the manufacture of war materials in order to replace younger men leaving to serve in the war. The non-credit, tuition-free, government sponsored college level courses trained workers already in war production to take over more highly skilled jobs.

Until this time the school offered only evening courses in mechanical subjects; in 1947 demand from returning veterans inspired the school to introduce four daytime courses (business administration, building construction, industrial electricity, and mechanical and production tool design).

In 1949, the Engineers' Council for Professional Development accredited the engineering courses offered by the school, and in 1953, the campus began offering its first 2-year program, an associate degree in engineering. In 1957, the associate degree in surveying technology was also approved. By 1971, the first two years of over 100 Penn State majors could be studied on the Wilkes-Barre campus, and in 1987, the campus offered its first baccalaureate degree: a B.S. in electrical engineering technology.

In 1968 the school moved from a variety of downtown Wilkes-Barre buildings to its current rural/suburban campus, a 54-acre estate in Lehman, PA, donated for that purpose by Richard and Helen Robinson and originally owned by John and Bertha Conyngham. The estate included Hayfield House, an impressive stone mansion designed by the architect Francis Augustus Nelson, and built in the early 1930s. (Pictures of the furnished mansion were taken by well-known architectural photographer Samuel H. Gottscho in 1934; these images are held in the Gottscho-Schleisner collection at the U.S. Library of Congress.) Hayfield House was converted into administrative offices and classrooms, and the 19-car stone garage was turned into the Student Commons.

The Penn State Wilkes-Barre Northern Tier Center, located in Towanda in Bradford County, was established in 1986 under the direction of the Penn State Wilkes-Barre Continuing Education department. Its mission is to extend the resources of the University to Bradford and Sullivan Counties, which are largely rural areas of Northeastern Pennsylvania not readily accessible to a Penn State campus.

=== Closure ===
On May 22, 2025 the Board of Trustees of Pennsylvania State University announced the closure of seven of its twenty regional Commonwealth campuses, including Penn State Wilkes-Barre. Enrollment had dropped to 329 students as of Fall 2024, a 68% decline from its peak and a drop of 40% in the past ten years. There were 10 other colleges within 30 miles (48 km) of the campus, which only had commuter students. In fiscal 2024, financial losses for campus were $2.1 million, and the campus had $30.9 million in deferred maintenance (or $44,000 per student). Penn State Wilkes-Barre will close after the Spring 2027 semester. Each current student will be given a "transition coach" and the campus' unique land surveying program will move to another Penn State campus.

== Athletics ==
Undergraduate demographics as of Fall 2023
Race and ethnicity	Total
White	80%
Black	8%
Hispanic	7%
Two or more races	4%
Asian	1%
International student	1%
Unknown	1%
Economic diversity
Low-income (Note: The percentage of students who received an income-based federal Pell grant intended for low-income students.)	40%
Affluent (Note: The percentage of students who are a part of the American middle class at the bare minimum.)	60%

Penn State Wilkes-Barre teams participate as members of the United States Collegiate Athletic Association (USCAA). The Nittany Lions are also a member of the Pennsylvania State University Athletic Conference (PSUAC). Men's sports include baseball, basketball, cross country, golf and soccer; women's sports include basketball, cross country, golf, soccer, softball and volleyball.
