= Silkworth, Pennsylvania =

Unincorporated community in Pennsylvania, US

- Census-designated place
- Location in Pennsylvania Location in the United States
- Coordinates: 41°16′20″N 76°5′10″W
- Country: United States
- State: Pennsylvania
- County: Luzerne
- Township: Lehman

Area
  - Total: 3.8 sq mi (9.9 km^{2})
  - Land: 3.4 sq mi (8.8 km^{2})
  - Water: 0.42 sq mi (1.1 km^{2})

Population (2010)
  - Total: 820
  - Density: 240/sq mi (93/km^{2})
- Time zone: UTC-5 (Eastern (EST))
  - Summer (DST): UTC-4 (EDT)
- ZIP code: 18621
- Area code: 570

Silkworth is a census-designated place (CDP) in Lehman Township, Luzerne County, Pennsylvania, United States. The population was 820 at the 2010 census.

== Geography ==
Silkworth is located at 41°16′20″N 76°5′10″W, along Pennsylvania Route 29 on the west shore of Lake Silkworth, about 10 miles (16 km) northwest of the city of Nanticoke.

According to the United States Census Bureau, the CDP has a total area of 3.8 square miles (9.9 km^{2}), of which 3.4 square miles (8.8 km^{2}) is land and 0.42 square miles (1.1 km^{2}), or 11.0%, is water.

== Education ==
The school district is Lake-Lehman School District.
