= Lewis Creek (Idaho) =

Stream in Valley County, Idaho, U.S.

Coordinates: 45°05′22″N 114°53′58″W

Lewis Creek (also called Lewis Fork) is a stream in Valley County, Idaho, in the United States.

The creek was named for explorer Meriwether Lewis.

== See also ==
- List of rivers of Idaho
