= Hunlock Township, Pennsylvania =

Township in Pennsylvania, US

Coordinates: 41°14′00″N 76°07′59″W

- Township
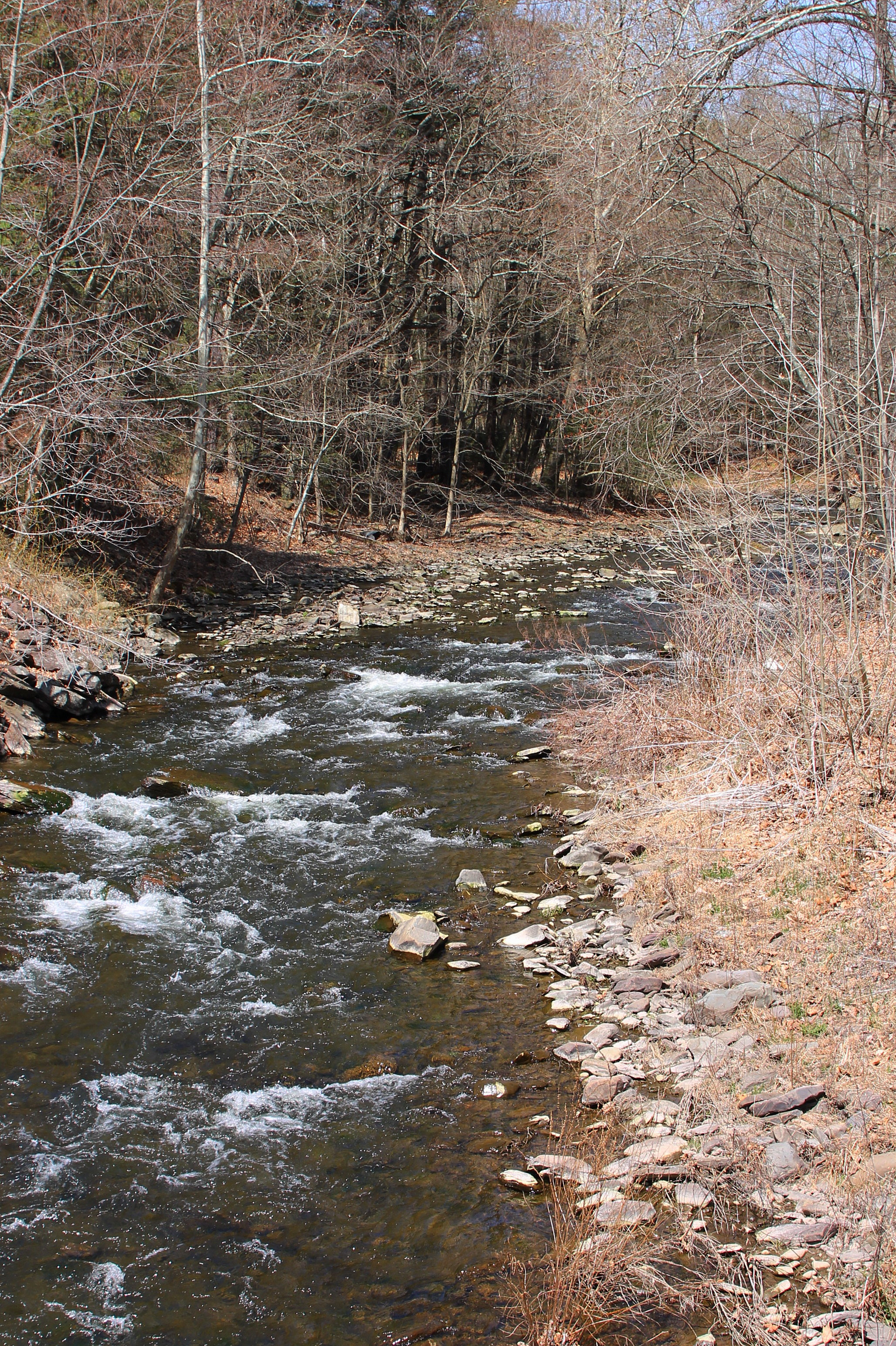
- Hunlock Creek, a major creek in Hunlock Township

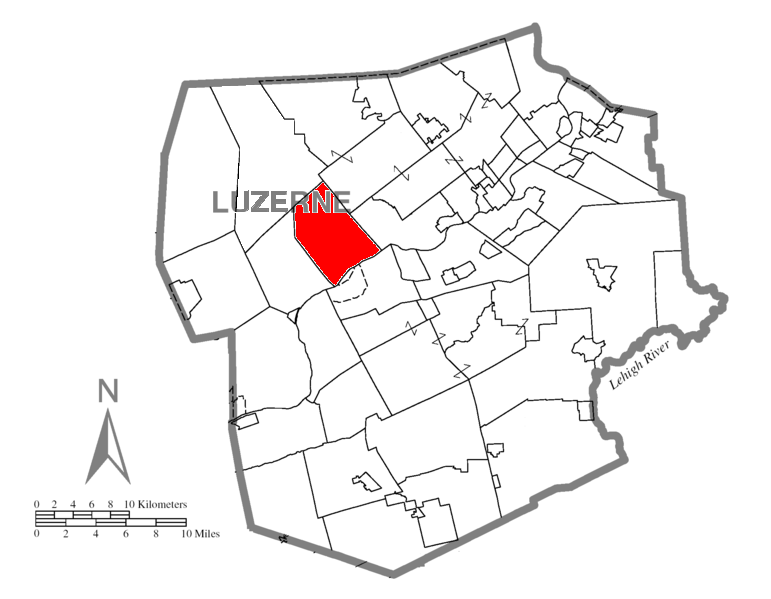
- Map of Luzerne County highlighting Hunlock Township

- Map of Pennsylvania highlighting Luzerne County
- Country: United States
- State: Pennsylvania
- County: Luzerne

Area
  - Total: 20.88 sq mi (54.08 km^{2})
  - Land: 20.64 sq mi (53.45 km^{2})
  - Water: 0.24 sq mi (0.63 km^{2})

Population (2020)
  - Total: 2,215 ▼
  - Estimate (2021): 2,218
  - Density: 116.7/sq mi (45.05/km^{2})
- Time zone: UTC-5 (Eastern (EST))
  - Summer (DST): UTC-4 (EDT)
- FIPS code: 42-079-36296

Hunlock Township is a township in Luzerne County, Pennsylvania, United States. The population was 2,215 at the 2020 census.

== History ==
It is believed that the first white settler was named “Boggs,” who constructed a log cabin in modern-day Hunlock Township. “Boggs” joined the Patriots during the Revolutionary War. It's speculated that while he was away from home, his family was either driven away or massacred by the Native Americans living within the region.

In 1778, Edward Blanchard and Jonathan Hunlock settled near the mouth of Hunlock Creek. They did not have their families with them; in 1790, they returned to their old homes. Future settlers to modern-day Hunlock Township were lumberjacks, who built saw mills in the territory. Additional settlers built gristmills and a smelting furnace.

Hunlock Township, which was named after Jonathan Hunlock, was organized on January 8, 1877; the territory was carved out of Union and Plymouth Townships. When the township was formed, it had a population of 759.

== Geography ==
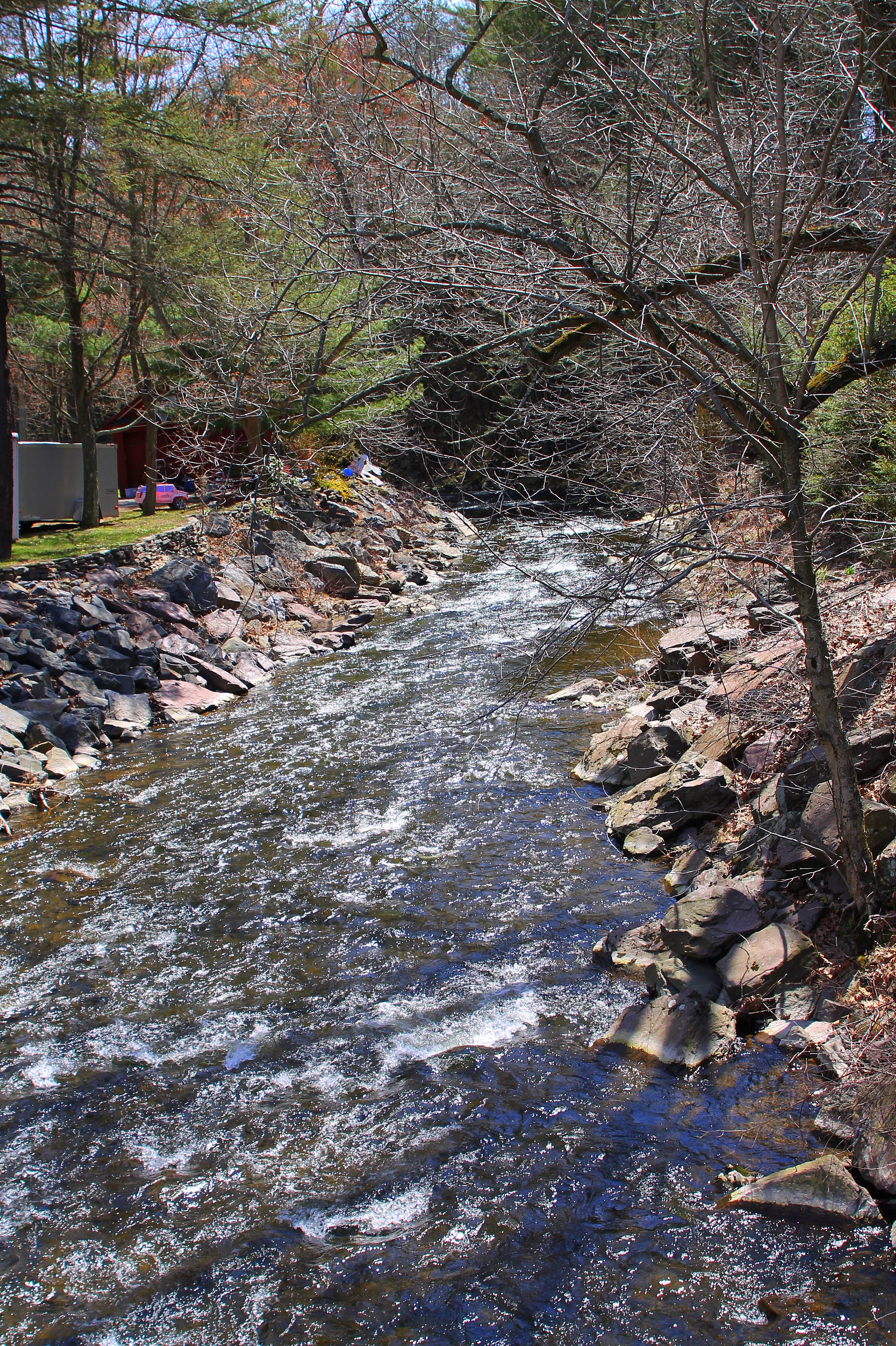
Hunlock Creek

According to the United States Census Bureau, the township has a total area of 20.9 square miles (54.1 km^{2}), of which 20.7 square miles (53.5 km^{2}) is land and 0.23 square miles (0.6 km^{2}), or 1.17%, is water. The Susquehanna River forms the southeastern border of the township. Elevations in the township range from 520 feet (160 m) above sea level along the Susquehanna River, to over 1,440 feet (440 m) along Shickshinny Mountain, overlooking the river.

Thick forests make up most of the township. Farms are scattered throughout the community. The Village of Hunlock Creek is located near the Susquehanna River. U.S. 11 and Hunlock Creek Turnpike are two major thoroughfares which run through the township. Several major creeks also flow through the municipality (e.g., Hunlock Creek, Roaring Brook, and Lewis Run).

== Demographics ==
Historical population
Census	Pop.	Note	%±
2000	2,568		—
2010	2,443		−4.9%
2020	2,215		−9.3%
2021 (est.)	2,218		0.1%
U.S. Decennial Census

As of the census of 2000, there were 2,568 people, 952 households, and 753 families living in the township. The population density was 120.6 inhabitants per square mile (46.6/km^{2}). There were 988 housing units at an average density of 46.4 per square mile (17.9/km^{2}). The racial makeup of the township was 98.83% White, 0.12% African American, 0.04% Native American, 0.43% Asian, and 0.58% from two or more races. Hispanic or Latino of any race were 0.04% of the population.

There were 952 households, out of which 34.3% had children under the age of 18 living with them, 67.0% were married couples living together, 8.1% had a female householder with no husband present, and 20.9% were non-families. 17.9% of all households were made up of individuals, and 8.6% had someone living alone who was 65 years of age or older. The average household size was 2.70 and the average family size was 3.05.

In the township the population was spread out, with 23.8% under the age of 18, 7.6% from 18 to 24, 29.0% from 25 to 44, 26.7% from 45 to 64, and 12.9% who were 65 years of age or older. The median age was 39 years. For every 100 females, there were 103.8 males. For every 100 females age 18 and over, there were 101.3 males.

The median income for a household in the township was $38,309, and the median income for a family was $41,071. Males had a median income of $28,641 versus $23,611 for females. The per capita income for the township was $15,541. About 6.7% of families and 8.2% of the population were below the poverty line, including 9.3% of those under age 18 and 8.7% of those age 65 or over.

== Education ==
Hunlock Township is part of Northwest Area School District.
